= List of fishes of the Coral Sea =

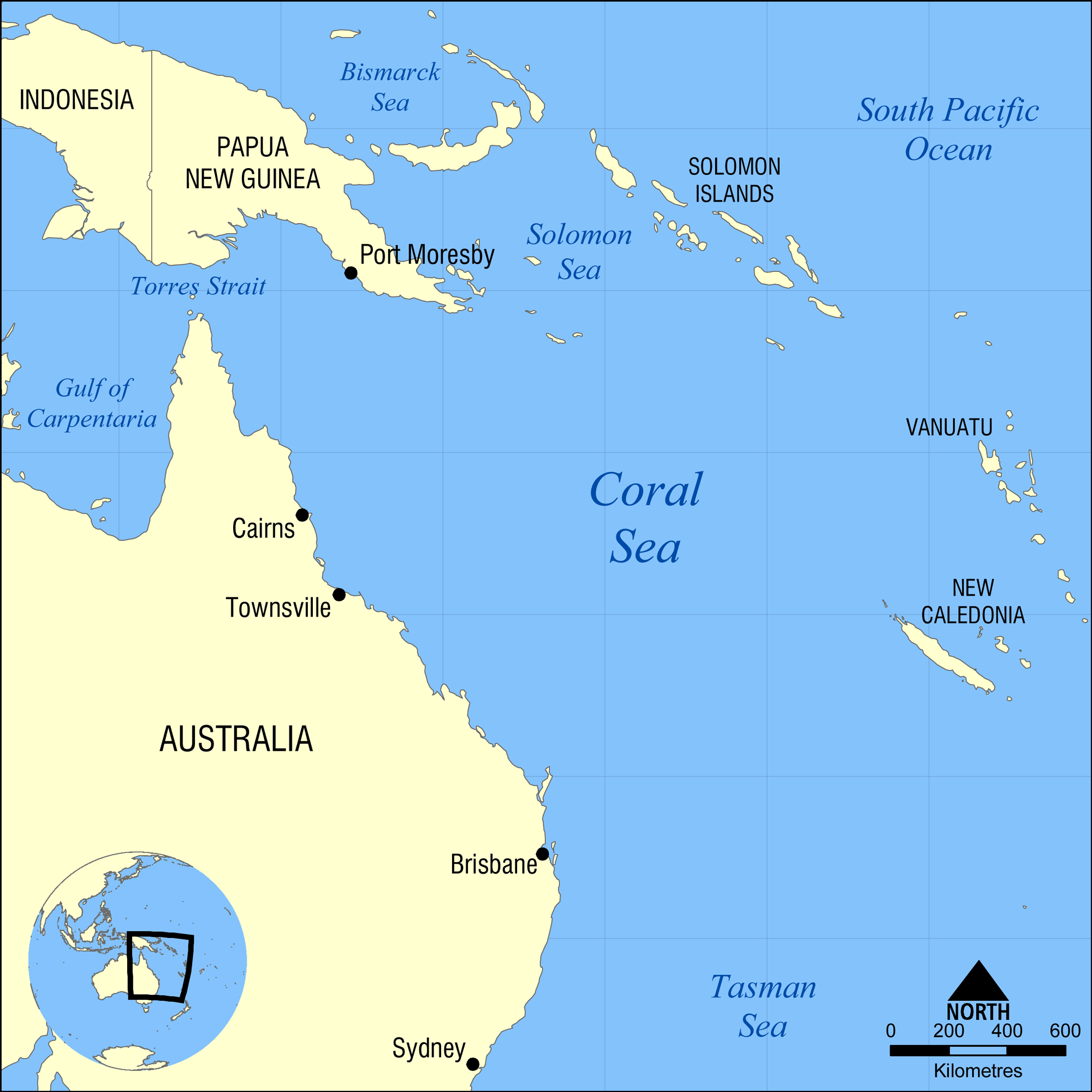
Coral Sea map

This is a list of fish recorded from the Coral Sea, bordering Australia, Papua New Guinea, Vanuatu and New Caledonia. This list comprises locally used common names, scientific names with author citation and recorded ranges. Ranges specified may not be the entire known range for the species, but should include the known range within the waters of the Coral Sea.

List ordering and taxonomy complies where possible with the current usage in Fishbase, and may differ from the cited source, as listed citations are primarily for range or existence of records for the region. Sub-taxa within any given family are arranged alphabetically as a general rule. Details of each species may be available through the relevant internal links. Synonyms may be listed where useful.

== Geographical scope ==
The International Hydrographic Organization defines the limits of the Coral Sea as follows:

On the North. The South coast of New Guinea from the entrance to the Bensbak River (141°01'E) to Gado-Gadoa Island near its Southeastern extreme (10°38′S 150°34′E), down this meridian to the 100 fathom line and thence along the Southern edges of Uluma (Suckling) Reef and those extending to the Eastward as far as the Southeast point of Lawik Reef (11°43.5′S 153°56.5′E) off Tagula Island [Vanatinai], thence a line to the Southern extreme of Rennell Island and from its Eastern point to Cape Surville, the Eastern extreme of San Cristobal Island [Makira], Solomons; thence through Nupani, the Northwestern of the Santa Cruz Islands (10°04.5′S 165°40.5′E) to the Northernmost Island of the Duff or Wilson Group (9°48.5′S 167°06′E).

On the Northeast. From the Northernmost island of the Duff or Wilson Group through these islands to their Southeastern extreme, thence a line to Mera Lava, New Hebrides Islands [Vanuatu] (14°25′S 163°03′E) and down the Eastern coasts of the islands of this Group to Aneityum Island (20°11′S 169°51′E) in such a way that all the islands of these Groups, and the straits separating them, are included in the Coral Sea.

On the Southeast. A line from the Southeastern extreme of Aneityum Island to Southeast (Nokanhui) Islets (22°46′S 167°34′E) off the Southeast extreme of New Caledonia, thence through the East point of Middleton Reef to the Eastern extreme of Elizabeth Reef (29°55′S 159°02′E) and down this meridian to Latitude 30° South.

On the South. The parallel of 30° South to the Australian coast.

On the West. The eastern limit of the Arafura Sea [The entrance to the Bensbak River (141°01'E), and thence a line to the northwest extreme of York Peninsula, Australia (11°05′S 142°03′E)] and the East Coast of Australia as far south as Latitude 30° South.

== Class Chondrichthyes ==
=== Order Hexanchiformes ===
Family Hexanchidae - six and sevengill sharks

- Bluntnose sixgill shark, Hexanchus griseus (Bonnaterre, 1788) (worldwide in tropical and temperate seas)

=== Order Heterodontiformes ===
Family Heterodontidae – hornsharks, Port Jackson sharks, bullhead sharks

- Zebra bullhead shark, Heterodontus zebra (Gray, 1831) (Northern Australia to southern Japan)

=== Order Orectolobiformes ===
Family Orectolobidae – wobbegongs

- Tasselled wobbegong, Eucrossorhinus dasypogon Regan, 1908 (Northern Australia and New Guinea)
- Banded wobbegong, Orectolobus ornatus (De Vis, 1883) (Northern Australia, New Guinea and southern Japan)
- Northern wobbegong, Orectolobus wardi Whitley, 1939 (Northern Australia)

Family Hemiscylliidae - bamboo sharks

- Brownbanded bamboo shark, Chiloscyllium punctatum Mueller and Henle, 1838 (east coast of Indian peninsula to Northern Australia and north to Japan)
- Epaulette shark, Hemiscyllium ocellatum (Bonnaterre, 1788) (Northern Australia and New Guinea)
- Speckled catshark, Hemiscyllium trispeculare Richardson, 1843 (Northern Australia)

Family Stegostomatidae - leopard sharks

- Zebra shark, Stegostoma fasciatum (Hermann, 1783) (East Africa and the Red Sea to Australia and New Caledonia)

Family Ginglymostomatidae - nurse sharks

- Tawny nurse shark, Nebrius ferrugineus (Lesson, 1830) (Indo-West Pacific from East Africa and the Red Sea to the Society Islands)

Family Rhincodontidae - whale sharks

- Whale shark, Rhincodon typus (Smith, 1828) (circumglobal in warm temperate seas)

=== Order Lamniformes ===
Family Odontaspididae - sand tiger sharks

- Grey nurse shark, Carcharias taurus Rafinesque, 1810 syn. Eugomphodus taurus (Around the Australian mainland, also widespread overseas) (tropical and temperate waters of most seas but absent from eastern and central Pacific Ocean)

Family Alopiidae - thresher sharks

- Small tooth thresher shark, Alopias pelagicus Nakamura, 1935 (circumtropical)

Family Lamnidae – makos, mackerel sharks

- Shortfin mako, Isurus oxyrinchus Rafinesque, 1809 (circumglobal in temperate and tropical seas)

=== Order Carcharhiniformes ===
Family Scyliorhinidae - catsharks

- Marbled catshark, Atelomycterus macleayi Whitley, 1939 (Northern Australia)
- Reticulated swellshark, Cephaloscyllium fasciatum Chen, 1966 (Northern Australia and South China Sea)

Family Carcharhinidae – whaler sharks, requiem sharks

- Silvertip shark, Carcharhinus albimarginatus (Rueppell, 1837) (tropical Indo-Pacific and eastern Pacific)
- Bignose shark, Carcharhinus altimus (Springer, 1950) (circumglobal in temperate and tropical seas)
- Grey reef shark, Carcharhinus amblyrhynchos (Bleeker, 1856) (East Africa and Red Sea east to Hawaii and Pitcairn Island)
- Pigeye shark, Carcharhinus amboinensis (Mueller & Henle, 1839) (East Africa to Australia)
- Bronze whaler, Carcharhinus brachyurus (Günther, 1870) (Jurien Bay, Western Australia to Coffs Harbour, New South Wales, and northern Tasmania) (along coastal margins in most tropical and temperate seas - apparently absent in western Atlantic)
- Long nose grey shark, Carcharhinus brevipinna (Mueller & Henle, 1839) (continental margins of all tropical and warm temperate seas except the eastern Pacific)
- Whitecheek shark, Carcharhinus dussumieri (Valenciennes, 1839) (continental margins from the Persian Gulf to Northern Australia and north to Japan)
- Silky shark, Carcharhinus falciformis (Bibron, 1839) (circumtropical, oceanic and coastal)
- Bull shark, Carcharhinus leucas (Valenciennes, 1839) (continental coasts of all tropical and subtropical seas, sometimes far up rivers)
- Blacktip shark, Carcharhinus limbatus (Valenciennes, 1839)
- Oceanic whitetip shark, Carcharhinus longimanus (Poey, 1861) (circumtropical, mainly oceanic-epipelagic)
- Blacktip reef shark, Carcharhinus melanopterus (Quoy & Gaimard, 1824) (Indo-West and central Pacific from East Africa and the Red Sea to Hawaii and French Polynesia)
- Black whaler, Carcharhinus obscurus (Lesueur, 1815) (circumglobal in tropical and warm temperate seas, primarily on continental shelves)
- Sandbar shark, Carcharhinus plumbeus (Nardo, 1827) (circumglobal in tropical and warm temperate seas)
- Blackspot shark, Carcharhinus sealei (Pietschmann, 1916) (East Africa to Northern Australia)
- Spot-tail shark, Carcharhinus sorrah (Valenciennes, 1837) (East Africa and the Red Sea to the Solomon and Santa Cruz Islands)
- Tiger shark, Galeocerdo cuvier (Peron & Lesueur, 1822) (circumtropical)
- Sicklefin lemon shark, Negaprion acutidens (Rueppell, 1837) (East Africa and the Red Sea to the Society Islands)

Family Hemigaleidae - weasel sharks

- Whitetip reef shark, Triaenodon obesus (Rueppell, 1837) (Indo-Pacific and tropical eastern Pacific)

Family Sphyrnidae - hammerhead sharks

- Scalloped hammerhead, Sphyrna lewini (Griffith & Smith, 1834) (worldwide in tropical and warm temperate seas)
- Great hammerhead, Sphyrna mokarran
- Winghead shark, Eusphyra blochii

=== Order Torpediniformes ===
Family Hypnidae – coffin rays, electric rays

- Coffin ray, Hypnos monopterygium (Shaw & Nodder, 1795) (Broome, Western Australia, to Caloundra, Queensland) (Western Australia, South Australia and south eastern Australia, including southern Queensland and adjacent Great Barrier Reef)

=== Order Rajiformes ===
Family Rhinobatidae – guitarfishes

- Common shovelnose ray, Glaucostegus typus (anonymous [Bennett], 1830) syn. Rhinobatos batillum Whitley, 1939 ((as R. batillum) Northern Australia between Shark Bay, Western Australia and the Capricorn group, occasionally near sand cays on the Great Barrier Reef)

=== Order Myliobatiformes ===
Family Dasyatidae – stingrays

- Kuhl's stingray, Dasyatis kuhlii (Mueller & Henle, 1841) (East Africa and Red Sea to Samoa and north to Japan)
- Blue-spotted stingray, Taeniura lymma (Forsskal, 1775) (East Africa to western Pacific and Great Barrier Reef)
- Black-blotched stingray, Taeniura meyeni Mueller & Henle, 1841 (Indo-Pacific)
- Thorny ray, Urogymnus africanus (Bloch & Schneider, 1801) (East Africa to Northern Australia and the Marshall Islands)

Family Myliobatidae – eagle rays

- Spotted eagle ray, Aetobatus narinari (Euphrasen, 1790) (cosmopolitan in tropical to warm temperate seas)

Family Mobulidae - mantas and devil rays

- Manta, Manta birostris (Donndorff, 1798) (circumtropical)
- Devil ray, Mobula tarapacana (Philippi, 1892) (Indo-Pacific and eastern Atlantic, possibly circumtropical)

== Class Osteichthyes ==
=== Order Albuliformes ===
Family Albulidae - bonefishes

- Pacific bonefish, Albula argentea (Forster & Bloch in Schneider, 1801) (Indo-Pacific)

=== Order Anguilliformes ===
Family Moringuidae - worm eels

- Slender worm-eel, Moringua ferruginea (Bliss, 1883) (East Africa to Easter Island and north to Ryukyu Islands)

Family Chlopsidae - false morays

- Grey reef eel, Kaupichthys diodontus Schultz, 1943 (East Africa to Society and Hawaiian islands)

Family Muraenidae – moray eels

- Seychelles moray, Anarchias seychellensis Smith, 1962 (Indo-Pacific)
- Starry moray, Echidna nebulosa (Ahl, 1879) (Indo-Pacific)
- Ringed moray, Echidna polyzona (Richardson, 1844) (Indo-Pacific)
- Bayer's moray, Enchelycore bayeri (Schulz, 1953) (Indo-Pacific)
- Viper moray, Enchelynassa canina (Quoy & Gaimard, 1824) (Indo-Pacific)
- Zebra moray, Gymnomuraena zebra (Shaw, 1797) (Indo-Pacific and tropical eastern Pacific)
- Latticetail moray, Gymnothorax buroensis (Bleeker, 1857) (Indo-Pacific and Galapagos Islands)
- Lipspot moray, Gymnothorax chilospilus Bleeker, 1865 (Indo-Pacific)
- Australian moray, Gymnothorax cribroris Whitley, 1932 (Great Barrier Reef and Western Australia)
- Stout moray, Gymnothorax eurostus (Abbott, 1860) (Indo-Pacific, antitropical, only in southern part of Great Barrier Reef)
- Blackspotted moray, Gymnothorax favagineus Bloch & Scneider, 1801 (western Pacific to East Africa)
- Darkspotted moray, Gymnothorax fimbriatus (Bennett, 1832) (Indo-Pacific)
- Yellowmargin moray, Gymnothorax flavimarginatus (Rueppell, 1830) (Indo-Pacific and tropical east Pacific)
- Freckled moray, Gymnothorax fuscomaculatus (Schultz, 1953) (Indo-Pacific)
- Slendertail moray, Gymnothorax gracilicauda Jenkins, 1903 (islands and reefs of Oceania to the Great Barrier Reef)
- Giant moray, Gymnothorax javanicus (Bleeker, 1859) (Indo-Pacific to Hawaii)
- Blackpearl moray, Gymnothorax margaritophorus Bleeker, 1864 (Indo-Pacific)
- Dwarf moray, Gymnothorax melatremus Schultz, 1953 (Indo-Pacific)
- Whitemouth moray, Gymnothorax meleagris (Shaw & Nodder, 1795) (Indo-Pacific)
- Yellowmouth moray, Gymnothorax nudivomer (Playfair & Guenther, 1867) (Hawaii and western Pacific to East Africa)
- Highfin moray, Gymnothorax pseudothyrsoideus (Bleeker, 1852) (western Pacific to India and Oman)
- Banded moray, Gymnothorax rueppelliae (McClelland, 1845) (Indo-Pacific)
- Greyface moray, Gymnothorax thyrsoideus (Richardson, 1845) syn. Siderea thyrsoidea (Richardson, 1845) ((as S. thyrsoidea) central and western Pacific)
- Undulated moray, Gymnothorax undulatus (Lacepede, 1803) (Indo-Pacific)
- Barredfin moray, Gymnothorax zonipectis Seale, 1906 (Indo-Pacific)
- Ribbon eel, Rhinomuraena quaesita Garman, 1888 (central and western Pacific to islands of the western Indian Ocean)
- Longtail moray, Strophidon sathete (Hamilton, 1822) (western Pacific to East Africa and the Red Sea)
- Peppered moray, Siderea picta (Ahl, 1789) (Indo-Pacific and islands of the tropical eastern Pacific)
- Marbled moray, Uropterygius marmoratus (Lacepede, 1803) (central and western Pacific)

Family Ophichthidae – snake eels, worm eels

- Sharpsnout snake eel, Apterichtus klazingai (Weber, 1913) (East Africa to the Marshall Islands)
- Stargazer snake eel, Brachysomophis cirrocheilos (Bleeker, 1857) (Indo-Pacific)
- Crocoddile snake eel, Brachysomophis crocodilinus (Bennett, 1831) (Indo-Pacific and Eastern Pacific)
- Black striped snake eel, Callechelys catostoma (Forster in Blich & Schneider, 1801) (Indonesia to Society Islands)
- Marbled snake eel, Callechelys marmorata (Bleeker, 1853) (East Africa to Society Islands)
- Culverin, Leiuranus semicinctus (Lay & Bennett, 1839) (East Africa to Polynesia)
- Slender snake eel, Muraenichthys macropterus Bleeker, 1857 (East Africa to the Society Islands)
- Harlequin snake eel, Myrichthys colubrinus (Boddaert, 1781) (Red Sea to the Society Islands)
- Spotted snake eel, Myrichthys maculosus (Cuvier, 1817) (East Africa and the Red Sea to Polynesia)
- Johnston snake eel, Schultzidia johnstonensis (Schultz & Woods, 1949) (Indo-Pacific)

Family Congridae – conger eels

- Speckled garden eel, Gorgasia sp. (western Pacific including Coral Sea, Guam and Marshall Islands)
- Black edged conger, Conger cinereus Rueppell, 1830 (East Africa and Red Sea to Easter Island)
- Spotted garden eel, Heteroconger hassi (Klausewitz & Eibl-Ebesfeldt, 1959) (Red Sea to Samoa and Line islands, north to Ryukyu Islands)

=== Order Clupeiformes ===
Family Clupeidae – herrings, pilchards, sardines

- Fourspot herring, Herklotsichthys quadrimaculatus (Rueppell, 1837) (East Africa to Samoa and Marshall Islands, Hawaii)
- Blue-backed sprat, Spratelloides delicatulus (Bennett, 1831) (East Africa and the Red Sea to the Society Islands)

=== Order Gonorhynchiformes ===
Family Chanidae - milkfish

- Milkfish, Chanos chanos (Forskal, 1775) (East Africa to Polynesia)

=== Order Siluriformes ===
Family Plotosidae - eeltail catfishes

- White-lipped catfish, Paraplotosus albilabris (Valenciennes, 1840) (Indonesia, Melanesia and Northern Australia)
- Striped catfish, Plotosus lineatus (Thunberg, 1787) (East Africa and Red Sea to Samoa)

=== Order Aulopiformes ===
Family Synodontidae – lizardfishes

- Slender lizardfish, Saurida gracilis (Quoy & Gaimard, 1824) (Indo-Pacific)
- Two-spot lizardfish, Synodus binotatus Schultz, 1953 (Indo-Pacific)
- Clearfin lizardfish, Synodus dermatogenys Fowler, 1912 (Indo-Pacific)
- Arrowtooth lizardfish, Synodus doaki Russell & Cressey, 1979 (Hawaii, New Zealand, eastern Australia, Japan and East Africa)
- Javelinfish, Synodus jaculum Russell & Cressey, 1979 (scattered records from the Line Islands in the central Pacific to Natal and the Comoro Islands)
- Redmarbled lizardfish, Synodus rubromarmoratus Russell & Cressey, 1979 (only known from Taiwan, Philippines and the Great Barrier Reef)
- Reef lizardfish, variegated lizardfish, Synodus variegatus (Lacepede, 1803) (tropical Australia south to Jutten Bay, Western Australia and Merimbula, New South Wales, also Lord Howe Island and widespread in the Indo-Pacific region) (Indo-Pacific)
- Snakefish, Trachinocephalus myops (Forster in Bloch & Schneider, 1801) (Indo-Pacific and Atlantic, tropical to warm temperate)

=== Order Ophidiiformes ===
Family Ophidiidae – cusk eels (?), lings, brotulas

- Bearded brotula, Brotula multibarbata Temminck & Schlegel, 1846 (Indo-Pacific)

Family Carapidae - pearlfishes

- Fowler's pearlfish, Onuxodon fowleri (Smith, 1955) (Indo-Pacific)

Family Bythitidae - cuskeels

- Slimy cuskeel, Brosmophyciops pautzkei Schultz, 1960 (Red Sea to Samoa and north to the Ryukyu Islands)
- Yellow cuskeel, Dinematichthys sp. (Indo-Pacific)

=== Order Batrachoidiformes ===
Family Batrachoididae – frogfishes, toadfishes

- Banded toadfish, Halophryne diemensis (Lesueur, 1824) (Northern Australia from Shark Bay, Western Australia to Heron Island, Queensland and throughout the Indo-Malayan Archipelago)

=== Order Lophiiformes ===
Family Antennariidae – anglerfishes

- Freckled anglerfish, Antennarius coccineus (Cuvier in Lesson, 1831) (Indo-Pacific eastward to the Americas)
- White-finger anglerfish, Antennarius nummifer (Cuvier, 1817) (East Africa and the Red Sea to the Society Islands, and north to Japan)
- Painted anglerfish, Antennarius pictus (Shaw & Nodder, 1794) (East Africa to the Society and Hawaiian Islands)
- Striate anglerfish, striped anglerfish, Antennarius striatus (Shaw & Nodder, 1794) (tropical Australia south to Wollagong, New South Wales and Geraldton Western Australia)
- Tuberculated anglerfish, Antennarius tuberosus (Cuvier, 1817) (East Africa to Samoa and the Hawaiian Islands)
- Sargassum fish, Histrio histrio (Linnaeus, 1758) (Indo-West Pacific and tropical Atlantic)

=== Order Gobiesociformes ===
Family Gobiesocidae – clingfishes, shore eels

- Urchin clingfish, Diademichthys lineatus (Sauvage, 1883) (Indo-Pacific)
- One stripe clingfish, Discotrema sp. (Indo-Pacific)

=== Order Beloniformes ===
Family Exocoetidae - flying fishes

- Sutton's flying fish, Cypselurus suttoni (Whitley & Colefax, 1938) (central and western Oceania)

Family Hemiramphidae - garfishes, halfbeaks

- Barred garfish, Hemiramphus far (Forsskal, 1775) (East Africa and Red Sea to Samoa)
- Dussumier's garfish, Hyporhamphus dussumieri (Valenciennes, 1846) (Seychelles to the Tuamotu Archipelago)

Family Belonidae - longtoms or needlefishes

- Flat tailed longtom, Platybelone argalus platyura (Bennett, 1832) (circumtropical)
- Slender longtom, Strongylura leiura (Bleeker, 1851) (East Africa to Fiji)
- Crocodile longtom, Tylosurus crocodilus crocodilus (Peron & Lesueur, 1821) (tropical Atlantic and Indo-Pacific)

=== Order Atheriniformes ===
Family Atherinidae – hardyheads, silversides

- Robust hardyhead, Atherinomorus lacunosus (Bloch & Schneider, 1801) (Indo-Pacific)
- Barnes' hardyhead, Hypoatherina barnesi Schultz, 1953 (western Pacific to East Africa)

=== Order Beryciformes ===
Family Monocentridae – pineapplefishes

- Australian pineapplefish, knightfish, Cleidopus gloriamaris De Vis, 1882 (Shark Bay, Western Australia to Great Australian Bight, Western Australia and Eden, New South Wales to Capricorn group, Queensland) (east and west coasts of Australia)

Family Holocentridae - squirrelfishes and soldierfishes

- Shadowfin soldierfish, Myripristis adusta Bleeker, 1851 (Indo-Pacific)
- Bigscale soldierfish, Myripristis berndti Jordan & Evermann, 1903 (Indo-Pacific and tropical eastern Pacific)
- Yellowfin soldierfish, Myripristis chryseres Jordan & Evermann, 1903 (scattered records from Natal to Hawaii)
- Doubletooth soldierfish, Myripristis hexagona (Lacepede, 1802) (East Africa to Samoa)
- Epaulette soldierfish, Myripristis kuntee (Cuvier, 1831) (Indo-Pacific)
- Blotcheye soldierfish, Myripristis murdjan (Forsskal, 1775) (Indo-Pacific)
- Scarlet soldierfish, Myripristis pralinia Cuvier, 1829 (Society Islands to islands of west Indian Ocean)
- Lattice soldierfish, Myripristis violacea Bleeker, 1851 (Indo-Pacific)
- Whitetip soldierfish, Myripristis vittata Valenciennes, 1831 (western Indian Ocean to the islands of Oceania)
- Yellowstriped squirrelfish, Neoniphon aurolineatus (Lienard, 1839) (Indo-Pacific)
- Blackfin squirrelfish, Neoniphon opercularis (Valenciennes, 1831) (Indo-Pacific)
- Spotfin squirrelfish, Neoniphon sammara (Forsskal, 1775) (Indo-Pacific)
- Rough scale soldierfish, Plectrypops lima (Valenciennes, 1831) (Indo-Pacific)
- Tailspot squirrelfish, Sargocentron caudimaculatum (Rueppell, 1838) (Indo-Pacific)
- Threespot squirrelfish, Sargocentrum cornutum (Bleeker, 1853) (Indonesia, Philippines, Solomon Islands and Great Barrier Reef)
- Crown squirrelfish, Sargocentron diadema (Lacepede, 1801) (Indo-Pacific)
- Samurai squirrelfish, Sargocentron ittodai (Jordan & Fowler, 1903) (scattered localities in the Indo-Pacific)
- Blackspot squirrelfish, Sargocentron melanospilos (Bleeker, 1858) (East Africa to Samoa)
- Smallmouth squirrelfish, Sargocentron microstoma (Guenther, 1859) (Islands of the western Indian Ocean to Oceania excepting Hawaii)
- Peppered squirrelfish, Sargocentron punctatissimum (Cuvier, 1839) (Indo-Pacific)
- Redcoat, Sargocentron rubrum (Forsskal, 1775) (Red Sea & East Africa to the western Pacific but absent from oceanic islands)
- Sabre squirrelfish, Sargocentron spiniferum (Forsskal, 1775) (Indo-Pacific)
- Tahitian squirrelfish, Sargocentron tiere (Cuvier, 1829) (Insular Indo-Pacific)
- Pink squirrelfish, Sargocentron tiereoides (Bleeker, 1853) (Indo-Pacific)
- Violet squirrelfish, Sargocentrum violaceum (Bleeker, 1853) (Indo-Pacific)

=== Order Syngnathiformes ===
Family Aulostomidae - trumpetfishes

- Trumpetfish, Aulostomus chinensis (Linnaeus, 1758) (Indo-Pacific and eastern Pacific)

Family Fistulariidae - flutemouths

- Smooth flutemouth, Fistularia commersonii Rueppell, 1838 (circumtropical)

Family Centriscidae - razorfishes and shrimpfishes

- Razorfish, Aeoliscus strigatus (Guenther, 1860) (northern Indian Ocean and western Pacific)

Family Solenostomidae - ghost pipefishes

- Ghost pipefish, Solenostomus cyanopterus Bleeker, 1852 (Indo-Pacific)
- Harlequin ghost pipefish, Solenostomus paradoxus (Pallas, 1870)

Family Syngnathidae – pipefishes, pipehorses, seahorses, seadragons

- Sculptured pipefish, Choeroichthys sculptus (Guenther, 1870) (East Africa to Polynesia)
- Brown banded pipefish, Corythoichthys amplexus Dawson & Randall, 1975 (western Indian Ocean to Samoa, and north to the Ryukyu Islands)
- Banded pipefish, Corythoichthys intestinalis (Ramsay, 1881) (Philippines to Northern Australia, eastward to Samoa and Tonga)
- Schultz's pipefish, Corythoichthys schultzi Herald, 1953 (Red Sea to Society Islands)
- Ringed pipefish, Doryrhamphus dactyliophorus (Bleeker, 1853) (East Africa and Red Sea to Samoa)
- Bluestripe pipefish, Doryrhamphus excisus excisus Kaup, 1856 (Indo-Pacific)
- Janss's pipefish, Doryrhamphus janssi (Herald & Randall, 1972) (Northern Australia and Solomon Islands north to Philippines and South China Sea)
- Brock's pipefish, Halicampus brocki (Herald, 1953) (western Pacific from Northern Australia to the Ryukyu Islands and eastward to the Marshall Islands)
- Ornate pipefish, Halicampus macrorhynchus Bamber, 1915 (Red Sea to Northern Australia and Melanesia)
- Glittering pipefish, Halicampus nitidus (Guenther, 1873) (Northern Australia to the Ryukyu Islands and eastwards to Fiji)
- Spotted seahorse, Hippocampus kuda Bleeker, 1852 (East Africa and the Red Sea to the Hawaiian and Society Islands)
- Shortnose pipefish, Micrognathus andersonii (Bleeker, 1858) (East Africa and the Red Sea to Samoa and north to Japan)
- Short tailed pipefish, Trachyrhamphus bicoarctatus (Bleeker, 1857) (East Africa and the Red Sea to New Caledonia and north to Japan)

=== Order Scorpaeniformes ===
Family Dactylopteridae - helmet gurnards

- Helmet gurnard, Dactyloptena orientalis (Cuvier, 1829) (East Africa to Polynesia)

Family Scorpaenidae – scorpionfishes

- Cockatoo waspfish, Ablabys taenianotus (Cuvier, 1829) (Andaman sea to Fiji and north to Japan)
- Dwarf lionfish, Dendrochirus brachypterus (Cuvier, 1829) (East Africa and the Red Sea to Samoa and Tonga and north to the Philippines)
- Zebra lionfish, Dendrochirus zebra (Quoy & Gaimard, 1825) (East Africa and the Red Sea to Samoa)
- Caledonian stinger, Inimicus caledonicus (Sauvage, 1878) (Andaman sea to Australia and New Caledonia)
- Mozambique scorpionfish, Parascorpaena mossambica (Peters, 1855) (East Africa to Society Islands)
- Ragged-finned firefish, Pterois antennata (Bloch, 1787) (East Africa to southeastern Polynesia)
- Red firefish, turkeyfish, Pterois volitans (Linnaeus, 1758) (Western Australia and Malaysia to southeastern Polynesia and north to Japan)
- Whiteface waspfish, Richardsonichthys leucogaster (Richardson, 1848) (India to Northern Australia and Melanesia)
- Weedy scorpionfish, Rhinopias aphanes Eschmeyer, 1973 (northeastern Australia, New Caledonia, New Guinea and north to Japan)
- Longfingered scorpionfish, Scorpaenodes albaiensis (Evermann & Seale, 1907) (western Pacific to East Africa)
- Guam scorpionfish, Scorpaenodes guamensis (Quoy & Gaimard, 1824) (East Africa and the Red Sea to the Pitcairn group)
- Hairy scorpionfish, Scorpaenodes hirsutus (Smith, 1957) (East Africa and the Red Sea to Polynesia)
- Shortfinned scorpionfish, Scorpaenodes parvipinnis (Garrett, 1864) (East Africa and the Red Sea to Polynesia)
- Shore scorpionfish, Scorpaenodes littoralis (Tanaka, 1917) (Indo-Pacific)
- Blotchfin scorpionfish, Scorpaenodes varipinnis Smith, 1957 (East Africa to Micronesia)
- False stonefish, Scorpaenopsis diabolus Cuvier, 1829 (East Africa and the Red Sea to Polynesia)
- Smallscale scorpionfish, Scorpaenopsis oxycephala (Bleeker, 1849) (East Africa and the Red Sea to the central Pacific)
- Raggy scorpionfish, Scorpaenopsis venosa (Cuvier, 1829) (East Africa to central Pacific)
- Yellow-spotted scorpionfish, Sebastapistes cyanostigma (Bleeker, 1856) (East Africa and the Red Sea to Samoa)
- Barchin scorpionfish, Sebastapistes strongia (Cuvier, 1829) (East Africa and the Red Sea to Society Islands)
- Estuarine stonefish, Synanceia horrida (Linnaeus, 1766) (India to Australia and north to China)
- Reef stonefish, Synanceia verrucosa Bloch & Schneider, 1801 (East Africa and the Red Sea to southeastern Polynesia)
- Leaf scorpionfish, Taenianotus triacanthus Lacepede, 1802 (East Africa to the Galapagos)

Family Caracanthidae - crouchers, orbicular velvetfishes

- Spotted croucher, Caracanthus maculatus (Gray, 1831) (East Indies and Australia to southeastern Polynesia, and north to Japan)
- Coral croucher, Caracanthus unipinna (Gray, 1831) (East Africa to the Taumotus, and north to Japan)

Family Aploactinidae – velvetfishes

- Threefin velvetfish, Neoaploactis tridorsalis Eschmeyer & Allen, 1978 (known only from Rottnest Island and Shark Bay in Western Australia and One Tree Island in the Capricorn group of the southern Great Barrier Reef)

Family Platycephalidae – flatheads

- Dwarf flathead, Onigocia oligolepis (Regan, 1908) (Indo-West Pacific)
- Sand flathead, Thysanophrys arenicola Schultz, 1966 (East Africa to the Marshall Islands)
- Longsnout flathead, Thysanophrys chiltonae Schultz, 1966 (East Africa to Marquesas Islands)
- Fringelip flathead, Sunagocia otaitensis (Cuvier, 1829) syn. Thysanophrys otaitensis (East Africa to the Taumotus)

=== Order Perciformes ===
Family Centropomidae - barramundi

- Sand bass, glasseye perch, Psammoperca waigiensis (Cuvier, 1829) (East Indies and Northern Australia to China)

Family Serranidae – rockcods, seaperches, groupers

Subfamily Anthiinae - anthias

- Waite's splitfin, Luzonichthys waitei (Fowler, 1931) (Philippines, Indonesia and Great Barrier Reef)
- Longfin perchlet, Plectranthias longimanus (Weber, 1913) (western Pacific to East Africa)
- Dwarf perchlet, Plectranthias nanus Randall, 1980 (islands of Oceania to Christmas and Cocos-Keeling islands in the eastern Indian Ocean)
- Redblotch perchlet, Plectranthias winniensis (Tyler, 1966) (Indo-Pacific)
- Bicolour anthias, Pseudanthias bicolor (Randall, 1979) (Hawaii and New Caledonia to the islands of the western Indian Ocean)
- Silverstreak anthias, Pseudanthias cooperi (Regan, 1902) (Line Islands and Samoa west to East Africa)
- Redfin anthias, Pseudanthias dispar (Herre, 1955) (western Pacific to Samoa and the Line Islands)
- Barrier Reef anthias, Pseudanthias engelhardi (Allen & Starck, 1983) (known only from Escape Reef, Great Barrier Reef)
- Striped anthias, Pseudanthias fasciatus (Kamohara, 1954) (southern Japan to the Great Barrier Reef)
- Threadfin anthias, Pseudanthias huchtii (Bleeker, 1857) (Philippines to Vanuatu and the Great Barrier Reef)
- Stocky anthias, Pseudanthias hypselosoma Bleeker, 1878 (Samoa to Maldives)
- Lori's anthias, Pseudanthias lori (Lubbock & Randall, 1976) (French Polynesia to Christmas Island, Indian Ocean)
- Yellowlined anthias, Pseudanthias luzonensis (Katayama & Masuda, 1983) (Philippines, Indonesia and the northern Great Barrier Reef)
- Amethyst anthias, Pseudanthias pascalus (Jordan & Tanaka, 1927) (French Polynesia to Australia, and in the north Pacific from the Marshall Islands to southern Japan)
- Painted anthias, Pseudanthias pictilis (Randall & Allen, 1978) (New Caledonia, Lord Howe Island and the southern Great Barrier Reef)
- Squarespot anthias, Pseudanthias pleurotaenia (Bleeker, 1857) (Philippines south to northern Great Barrier Reef and east to the Marshall Islands and Samoa)
- Redbar anthias, Pseudanthias rubrizonatus (Randall, 1983) (Philippines, New Guinea, Solomon Islands, Fiji and Great Barrier Reef)
- Princess anthia, Pseudanthias smithvanizi (Randall & Lubbock, 1981) (Marshall Islands to Christmas and Keeling-Cocos Islands in the eastern Indian Ocean)
- Scalefin anthias, Pseudanthias squamipinnis (Peters, 1855) (western Pacific to East Africa and the Red Sea)
- Purple anthias, Pseudanthias tuka (Herre & Montalban, 1927) (Philippines to northern Great Barrier Reef)
- Longfin anthias, Pseudanthias ventralis (Randall, 1979) (Great Barrier Reef north to southern Japan, east to the islands of Oceania except Hawaii)
- Hawk anthias, Serranocirrhitus latus (Watanabe, 1949) (southern Japan, Indonesia, Palau, Vanuatu, New Caledonia and the Great Barrier Reef)

Subfamily Epinephelinae - rockcods

- Redmouth rockcod, Aethaloperca rogaa (Forsskal, 1775) (Red Sea and coast of East Africa to Kiribati)
- White-lined rockcod, Anyperodon leucogrammicus (Valenciennes, 1828) (Red Sea and East Africa to Samoa and the Marshall Islands)
- Peacock rockcod, Cephalopholis argus Bloch & Schneider, 1801 (Indo-Pacific and Hawaiian Islands)
- Brown-barred rockcod, Cephalopholis boenak (Bloch, 1790) (western Pacific to East Africa)
- Blue-spotted rockcod, Cephalopholis cyanostigma (Valenciennes, 1828) (Philippines to Queensland, west to Thailand and Western Australia)
- Blue-lined rockcod, Cephalopholis formosa (Shaw, 1804) (western Pacific to Western India)
- Leopard rockcod, Cephalopholis leopardus (Lacepede, 1801) (Indo-Pacific)
- Dothead rockcod, Cephalopholis microprion (Bleeker, 1852) (western Pacific to Andaman Sea)
- Coral cod, Cephalopholis miniata (Forsskal, 1775) (Line Islands in the central Pacific to East Africa and the Red Sea)
- Sixspot rockcod, Cephalopholis sexmaculata (Rueppell, 1830) (Indo-Pacific)
- Tomato rockcod, Cephalopholis sonnerati (Valenciennes, 1828) (Line Islands and Kiribati in central Pacific to East Africa)
- Strawberry rockcod, Cephalopholis spiloparaea (Valenciennes, 1828) (Indo-Pacific)
- Flagtail rockcod, Cephalopholis urodeta (Bloch & Scneider, 1801) (central and western Pacific)
- Barramundi cod, Cromileptes altivelis (Valenciennes, 1828) (western Pacific to Nicobar Islands)
- Areolate rockcod, Epinephelus areolatus (Forsskal, 1775) (western Pacific to East Africa and the Red Sea)
- White-spotted rockcod, Epinephelus caerulopunctatus (Bloch, 1790) (Kiribati and Caroline Islands to East Africa)
- Estuary cod, Epinephelus coioides (Hamilton, 1822) (western Pacific to western Indian Ocean)
- Coral rockcod, Epinephelus corallicola (Valenciennes, 1828) (western Pacific)
- Blue Maori, Epinephelus cyanopodus (Richardson, 1846) (western Pacific to Marshall Islands and Kiribati)
- Black-tipped rockcod, Epinephalus fasciatus (Forsskal, 1775) (Indo-Pacific)
- Flowery cod, Epinephelus fuscoguttatus (Forsskal, 1775) (Marshall Islands and Phoenix Islands to East Africa and the Red Sea)
- Hexagon rockcod, Epinephelus hexagonatus (Bloch & Schneider, 1801) (Indo-Pacific)
- Blacksaddle rockcod, Epinephelus howlandi (Guenther, 1873) (western Pacific from Ryukyu Islands to Great Barrier Reef and east to the Marshalls and Samoa)
- Queensland grouper, Epinephelus lanceolatus (Bloch, 1790) (Indo-Pacific)
- Snubnose rockcod, Epinephelus macrospilos (Bleeker, 1855) (central western Pacific to Nicobar Islands)
- Trout cod, Epinephelus maculatus (Bloch, 1790) (western Pacific to Marshall Islands and Samoa)
- Malabar grouper, Epinephelus malabaricus (Bloch & Schneider, 1801) (western Pacific to East Africa and Red Sea)
- Dwarf spotted rockcod, Epinephelus merra Bloch, 1793 (Indo-Pacific)
- Speckled-fin rockcod, Epinephelus ongus (Bloch, 1790) (Caroline Islands and western Pacific to East Africa)
- Camouflage rockcod, Epinephelus polyphekadion (Bleeker, 1856) (Indo-Pacific)
- Longfin rockcod, Epinephelus quoyanus (Valenciennes, 1830) (western Pacific to southwest coast of Thailand)
- Chinaman rockcod, Epinephelus rivulatus (Valenciennes, 1830) (western Pacific and Indian Ocean)
- Sixbar rockcod, Epinephelus sexfasciatus (Valenciennes, 1828) (Indo-Malayan region)
- Four-saddle rockcod, Epinephelus spilotoceps Schultz, 1953 (Line Islands in the central Pacific to East Africa)
- Greasy rockcod, Epinephelus tauvina (Forsskal, 1775) (Indo-Pacific)
- Potato cod, Epinephelus tukula Morgans, 1959 (western Pacific to East Africa and the Red Sea)
- Maori cod, Epinephelus undulatostriatus (Peters, 1866) (southern Great Barrier Reef to New South Wales)
- Thinspine rockcod, Gracila albomarginata (Fowler & Bean, 1930) (Indo-Pacific)
- Squaretail coral trout, Plectropomus areolatus (Rueppell, 1830) (Marshall Islands and Samoa to the Maldives and Red Sea)
- Chinese footballer, Plectropomus laevis (Lacepede, 1802) (Indo-Pacific except Red Sea)
- Coral trout, Plectropomus leopardus (Lacepede, 1802) (Fiji and Caroline Islands to Western Australia)
- Barred-cheek coral trout, Plectropomus maculatus (Bloch, 1790) (Philippines, southeast Asia, Indonesia and Australia)
- Highfin coral trout, Plectropomus oligacanthus (Bleeker, 1854) (Philippines, Indonesia, New Guinea, Solomons and north Great Barrier Reef)
- Lyretail trout, Variola albimarginata Baissac, 1953 (western Pacific to western Indian Ocean)
- Coronation trout, Variola louti (Forsskal, 1775) (Indo-Pacific)

Subfamily Grammistinae

Tribe Liopropomini

- Headband perch, Liopropoma mitratum Lubbock & Randall, 1978 (scattered through Indo-Pacific)
- Manyline perch, Liopropoma multilineatum Randall & Taylor, 1988 (Philippines to the Coral Sea and Fiji)
- Meteor perch, Liopropoma susumi (Jordan & Seale, 1906) (Line Islands and Samoa to East Africa)
- Flathead perch, Rainfordia opercularis McCulloch, 1923 (Queensland to Western Australia)

Tribe Diploprioni

- Arrowhead soapfish, Belonoperca chabanaudi Fowler & Bean, 1930 (Samoa and Marshall Islands to East Africa)
- Barred soapfish, yellow emperor, Diploprion bifasciatum Cuvier, 1828 (western Pacific to India)

Tribe Grammistini

- Sixline soapfish, Grammistes sexlineatus (Thunberg, 1792) (Indo-Pacific)

Tribe Pseudogrammini

- Ocellated podge, Grammistops ocellatus Schultz, 1958 (Indo-Pacific)
- Poreless podge, Aporops bilinearis Schultz, 1943 (Indo-Pacific)
- Palespotted podge, Pseudogramma polyacantha (Bleeker, 1856) (Indo-Pacific)

Family Pseudochromidae – dottybacks and eel blennies

Subfamily Congrogadinae

- Carpet eel blenny, Congrogadus subducens (Richardson, 1843) (Malay Peninsula and Philippine Islands to Australia)

Subfamily Pseudochromidae

- Oblique-lined dottyback, Cypho purpurascens (De Vis, 1884) (Southwestern Pacific)
- Fine-scaled dottyback, Lubbockichthys multisquamatus (Allen, 1987) syn. Pseudoplesiops multisquamatus (eastern Indian Ocean to central Pacific)
- Multicoloured dottyback, Ogilbyina novaehollandiae (Steindachner, 1880) (southern Great Barrier Reef)
- Queensland dottyback, Ogilbyina queenslandiae (Saville-Kent, 1893) (Great Barrier Reef)
- Sailfin dottyback, Ogilbyina velifera (Lubbock, 1980) (Great Barrier Reef)
- Double-striped dottyback, Pseudochromis bitaeniatus (Fowler, 1931) (Indonesia, Philippines, Solomon Islands and the northern Great Barrier Reef)
- Blue-barred dottyback, Pseudochromis cyanotaenia Bleeker, 1857 (eastern Indian Ocean to central Pacific)
- Brown dottyback, Pseudochromis fuscus Mueller & Troschel, 1849 (central Indian Ocean to western Pacific)
- Firetail dottyback, Pseudochromis flammicauda Lubbock & Goldman, 1976 (Great Barrier Reef)
- Spot-tailed dottyback, Pseudochromis jamesi Schultz, 1943 (south-western Pacific)
- Royal dottyback, Pseudochromis paccagnellae Axelrod, 1973 (Indonesia to Melanesia and Australia)
- Midnight dottyback, Pseudochromis paranox Lubbock & Goldman, 1976 (Southwestern Pacific)
- Spotted dottyback, Pseudochromis quinquedentatus McCulloch, 1926 (Northern Australia)
- Yellowfin dottyback, Pseudochromis wilsoni (Whitley, 1929) (Northern Australia)
- Bug-eyed dottyback, Pseudoplesiops knighti Allen, 1987 (Indonesia, Melanesia and Northern Australia)
- Large-scaled dottyback, Pseudoplesiops rosae Schultz, 1943 (eastern Indian Ocean to central Pacific)
- Bearded dottyback, Pseudoplesiops sp. (central Indian Ocean to western Pacific)
- Ring-eyed dottyback, Pseudoplesiops typus Bleeker, 1858 (eastern Indian Ocean to central Pacific)

Family Plesiopidae – prettyfins, blue devilfishes, hulafishes, longfins

- Yellow devilfish, Assessor flavissimus Allen & Kuiter, 1976 (northern Great Barrier Reef)
- Blue devilfish, Assessor macneilli Whitley, 1935 (Great Barrier Reef and New Caledonia)
- Comet, Calloplesiops altivelis (Steindachner, 1903) (East Africa and Red Sea to Tonga and the Line Islands)
- Blue-tip longfin, Paraplesiops poweri Ogilby, 1908 (central and southern Queensland and adjacent Great Barrier Reef)
- Red-tipped longfin, Plesiops coeruleolineatus Rueppell, 1835 (East Africa and the Red Sea to Australia and the Marshall Islands)
- Coral Sea longfin, Plesiops insularis Mooi & Randall, 1991 (Great Barrier Reef)
- Cheekveil longfin, Plesiops genaricus Mooi & Randall (Great Barrier Reef)

Subfamily Acanthoclininae

- Banded spiny basslet, Belonepterygion fasciolatum (Ogilby, 1889) (west and east coasts of Australia in tropical and subtropical seas, and Lord Howe Island)

Family Teraponidae - grunters

- Crescent grunter, Terapon jarbua (Forsskal, 1775) (East Africa and the Red Sea to Samoa)

Family Kuhliidae - flagtails

- Fiveband flagtail, Kuhlia mugil (Forster in Bloch & Scneider, 1801) (Indo-Pacific and tropical eastern Pacific)

Family Priacanthidae - bigeyes

- Glasseye, Heteropriacanthus cruentatus (Lacepede, 1801) (circumglobal in tropical and subtropical seas)
- Bloch's bigeye, Priacanthus blochii Bleeker, 1853 (Samoa to Gulf of Aden)
- Crescent tail bigeye, Priacanthus hamrur (Forsskal, 1775) (Indo-Pacific)

Family Apogonidae – cardinalfishes

- Ring-tailed cardinalfish, Apogon aureus (Lacepede, 1802) (East Africa to western Pacific)
- Ruby cardinalfish, Apogon crassiceps Garman, 1903 (western Pacific to islands of Oceania except Hawaii)
- Split-banded cardinalfish, Apogon compressus (Smith & Radcliffe, 1911) (East Indies to Solomon Islands and north to Ryukyu Islands)
- Yellow-striped cardinalfish, Apogon cyanosoma Bleeker, 1853 (East Africa and Red Sea to Australia and the Marshall Islands)
- Doederlein's cardinalfish, Apogon doederleini Jordan & Snyder, 1901 (western Pacific antitropical: southern Japan to Taiwan in the north, subtropical Australia to New Caledonia and the Kermadec Islands in the south)
- Fragile cardinalfish, Apogon fragilis Smith, 1961 (East Africa to Samoa)
- Frostfin cardunalfish, Apogon hoeveni Bleeker, 1854 (East Indies and Northern Australia to Japan)
- Longspine cardinalfish, Apogon leptacanthus Bleeker, 1856 (East Africa and the Red Sea to Samoa)
- Moluccan cardinalfish, Apogon moluccensis Valenciennes, 1832 (East Indies and Northern Australia)
- Blackstripe cardinalfish, Apogon nigrofasciatus Lachner, 1953 (Red Sea to the Taumotus)
- Spotnape cardinalfish, Apogon notatus (Houttuyn, 1782) (Coral Sea to southern Japan)
- Sangi cardinalfish, Apogon sangiensis Bleeker, 1857 (East Indies to Vanuatu and north to Japan)
- Oblique banded cardinalfish, Apogon semiornatus Peters, 1876 (East Africa to Northern Australia and north to Japan)
- Three-spot cardinalfish, Apogon trimaculatus Cuvier, 1828 (East Indies to Samoa, north to the Ryukyu Islands)
- Three saddle cardinalfish, Apogon sp. (French Polynesia and Marshall Islands to northern Indian Ocean)
- Timor cardinalfish, Apogonichthyoides timorensis (Bleeker, 1854) syn. Apogon timorensis ((as A. timorensis) East Africa and the Red Sea to Northern Australia and north to Japan)
- Ocellated cardinalfish, Apogonichthys ocellatus (Weber, 1913) (East Africa to the Marquesas and Taumotus)
- Narrow-lined cardinalfish, Archamia fucata (Cantor, 1850) (East Africa and the Red Sea to Samoa)
- Lea's cardinalfish, Archamia leai Waite, 1916 (Coral Sea and southern Great Barrier Reef)
- Two-spot cardinalfish, Archamia biguttata Lachner, 1951 (Northern Australia and New Guinea)
- Girdled cardinalfish, Archamia zosterophora (Bleeker, 1856) (Indonesia and Philippines to New Caledonia and north to the Ryukyu Islands)
- Tiger cardinalfish, Cheilodipterus macrodon (Lacepede, 1802) (Indo-Pacific)
- Wolf cardinalfish, Cheilodipterus artus Smith, 1961 (East Africa to the Taumotu Archipelago, In the western Pacific from Ryukyu Islands to the Great Barrier Reef)
- Five-lined cardinalfish, Cheilodipterus quinquelineatus Cuvier, 1828 (East Africa and the Red Sea to southeastern Polynesia)
- Mimic cardinalfish, Cheilodipterus parazonatus Gon, 1993 (Indonesia, Philippines, New Guinea and Queensland)
- Weed cardinalfish, Foa brachygramma (Jenkins, 1903) (East Africa to Hawaiian Islands)
- Dwarf cardinalfish, Fowleria vaiulae (Jordan & Seale, 1906) (Red Sea to western Pacific)
- Aurita cardinalfish, Fowleria aurita (Valenciennes, 1831) (East Africa and the Red Sea to the western Pacific)
- Eared cardinalfish, Fowleria marmorata (Alleyne & Macleay, 1877) (Red Sea to southeastern Polynesia)
- Peppered cardinalfish, Fowleria punctulata (Rueppell, 1838) (Red Sea to central and south Pacific)
- Variegated cardinalfish, Fowleria variegata (Valenciennes, 1832) (Red Sea to Samoa and north to Ryukyu Islands)
- Eightspine cardinalfish, Neamia octospina Smith & Radcliffe, 1912 (East Africa and the Red Sea to Australia and Philippine Islands)
- Guam cardinalfish, Nectamia fusca (Quoy & Gaimard, 1825) syn. Apogon guamensis Valenciennes, 1832 ((as A. guamensis) East Africa and Red Sea to Samoa)
- Samoan cardinalfish, Nectamia savayensis (Günther, 1872) syn. Apogon savayensis ((as A. savayensis) Indo-Pacific from East Africa to French Polynesia)
- Striped cardinalfish, Ostorhinchus angustatus (Smith & Radcliffe, 1911) syn. Apogon angustatus ((as A. angustatus) East Africa and the Red Sea to Melanesia and Micronesia)
- Goldbelly cardinalfish, Ostorhinchus apogonoides (Bleeker, 1856) syn. Apogon apogonides ((as A. apogonides) East Africa to East Indies and Australia)
- Cook's cardinalfish, Ostorhinchus cookii (MacLeay, 1881) syn. Apogon cookii ((as A. cookii) East Africa to Australia, north to Japan)
- Rifle cardinalfish, Ostorhinchus kiensis (Jordan & Snyder, 1901) syn. Apogon kiensis ((as A. kiensis) East Africa and Red Sea north to Japan)
- Nine-banded cardinalfish, Ostorhinchus novemfasciatus (Cuvier, 1828) syn. Apogon novemfasciatus ((as A. novemfasciatus) Cocos-Keeling Islands to Samoa and north to the Izu Islands)
- Coral cardinalfish, Ostorhinchus properuptus (Whitley, 1964) syn. Apogon properupta ((as A. properupta) Queensland and the northern section of the Great Barrier Reef south to Montague Island, New South Wales)
- Reef-flat cardinalfish, Ostorhinchus taeniophorus (Regan, 1908) syn. Apogon taeniophorus ((as A. taeniophorus) Mauritius to Polynesia)
- Flame cardinalfish, Ostorhinchus talboti (Smith, 1961) syn. Apogon talboti Smith, 1961 ((as A. talboti) Indo-Pacific)
- Narrowstripe cardinalfish, Pristiapogon exostigma (Jordan & Starks, 1906) syn. Apogon exostigma ((as A. exostigma) Red Sea to southeastern Polynesia)
- Spur-cheek cardinalfish, Pristiapogon fraenatus (Valenciennes, 1832) syn. Apogon fraenatus ((as A. fraenatus) East Africa and Red Sea to the Line Islands and Taumotu Archipelago)
- Iridescent cardinalfish, Pristiapogon kallopterus (Bleeker, 1856) syn. Apogon kallopterus Bleeker, 1856 ((as A. kallopterus) East Africa and Red Sea to Polynesia)
- Gelatinous cardinalfish, Pseudamia gelatinosa Smith, 1954 (East Africa and the Red Sea to the Society Islands and north to Japan)
- Slender cardinalfish, Rhabdamia gracilis (Bleeker, 1856) (East Africa to the Marshall Islands)
- Striped siphonfish, Siphamia majimai Matsubara & Iwai, 1958 (Northern Australia to Japan)
- Threadfin cardinalfish, Sphaeramia nematoptera (Bleeker, 1856) (East Indies and Northern Australia to Micronesia and north to Japan)

Family Malacanthidae - sand tilefishes

- Grey tilefish, Hoplolatilus cuniculus Randall & Dooley, 1974 (Mauritius to the Society Islands)
- Blue tilefish, Hoplolatilus starcki Randall & Dooley, 1974 (Indonesia to Australia, Melanesia and Micronesia)
- Flagtail banquillo, Malacanthus brevirostris Guichenot, 1848 (East Africa and the Red Sea to the Hawaiian Islands)
- Blue blanquilillo, Malacanthus latovittatus (Lacepede, 1801) (East Africa and the Red Sea to the Cook Islands, north to Japan)

Family Echeneidae - remoras, suckerfish

- Slender suckerfish, Echeneis naucrates Linnaeus, 1758 (circumtropical)

Family Carangidae – trevallies

- Pennantfish, Alectis ciliaris (Bloch, 1788) (worldwide in tropical seas)
- Diamond trevally, Alectis indicus (Rueppell, 1830) (East Africa to Australia and the Ryukyu Islands)
- Fringe-finned trevally, Pantolabus radiatus (MacLeay, 1881) syn. Absalom radiatus (Macleay, 1881) ((as A. radiatus) Indonesia and Northern Australia)
- Small mouth scad, Alepes sp. (Indonesia and Northern Australia)
- Yellowtail scad, Atule mate (Cuvier, 1833) (Indo-West Pacific to Hawaiian Islands)
- Onion trevally, Carangoides caeruleopinnatus (Rueppell, 1830) (East Africa to Japan and Australia)
- Club-nosed trevally, Carangoides chrysophrys (Cuvier, 1833) (East Africa to Japan and Australia)
- Whitefin trevally, Carangoides equula (Temminck & Schlegel, 1844) (East Africa, Gulf of Oman, Japan, Australia, New Zealand, Hawaii and Easter Island)
- Blue trevally, Carangoides ferdau (Forsskal, 1775) (Indo-Pacific east to Hawaiian Islands)
- Gold-spotted trevally, Carangoides fulvoguttatus (Forsskal, 1775) (Indo-Pacific)
- Bludger trevally, Carangoides gymnostethus (Cuvier, 1833) (Indo-Pacific)
- Bump-nosed trevally, Carangoides hedlandensis (Whitley, 1934) (East Africa to Samoa and north to Japan)
- Epaulet trevally, Carangoides humerosus (McCulloch, 1915) (Indonesia, New Guinea and Northern Australia)
- Malabar trevally, Carangoides malabaricus (Bloch & Schneider, 1801) (tropical coastal waters of Indo-Pacific)
- Thicklip trevally, Carangoides orthogrammus (Jordan & Gilbert, 1881) (Indo-Pacific and eastern Pacific)
- White-tongued trevally, Carangoides talamparoides Bleeker, 1852 (Gulf of Oman to Northern Australia)
- Japanese trevally, Carangoides uii Wakiya, 1924 (East Africa to Australia and Japan)
- Blue-spotted trevally, Caranx bucculentus Alleyne & Macleay, 1877 (Northern Australia and New Guinea)
- Giant trevally, Caranx ignobilis (Forsskal, 1775) (Indo-West Pacific from East Africa to the Hawaiian and Marquesas Islands)
- Black trevally, Caranx lugubris Poey, 1860 (circumtropical)
- Bluefin trevally, Caranx melampygus Cuvier, 1833 (tropical Indo-Pacific to the Americas)
- Brassy trevally, Caranx papuensis Alleyne & Macleay, 1877 (Indo-Pacific eastward to the Marquesas)
- Banded scad, Alepes kleinii (Bloch, 1793) (East Africa to Northern Australia and north to Japan)
- Bigeye trevally, Caranx sexfasciatus Quoy & Gaimard, 1824 (tropical Indo-Pacific from East Africa to the Americas)
- Tille trevally, Caranx tille Cuvier, 1833 (East Africa, Madagascar, Sri Lanka, Okinawa to Australia and Fiji)
- Redtail scad, Decapterus kurroides Bleeker, 1855 (East Africa to Australia and Japan)
- Mackerel scad, Decapterus macarellus (Cuvier, 1833) (circumtropical)
- Long-bodied scad, Decapterus macrosoma Bleeker, 1851 (Indo-Pacific and eastern Pacific)
- Russell's mackerel scad, Decapterus russelli (Rueppell, 1830) (East Africa to Japan and Australia)
- Rough-ear scad, Decapterys tabl Berry, 1968 (Indo-Pacific east to Hawaiian Islands)
- Rainbow runner, Elagatis bipinnulata (Quoy & Gaimard, 1825) (circumtropical)
- Golden trevally, Gnathanodon speciosus (Forsskal, 1775) (tropical Indo-Pacific eastwards to the Americas)
- Finny scad, Megalaspis cordyla (Linnaeus, 1758) (Indo-Pacific to Japan and Australia)
- Pilotfish, Naucrates ductor (Linnaeus, 1758) (circumtropical)
- Black pomfret, Parastromateus niger (Bloch, 1795) (East Africa to southern Japan and Australia)
- Silver trevally, Pseudocaranx dentex (Bloch & Schneider, 1801) (antitropical, both sides of the Atlantic, Mediterranean and Indo-Pacific eastwards to the Hawaiian Islands)
- Talang queenfish, Scomberoides commersonnianus Lacepede, 1801 (East Africa to Taiwan and Australia)
- Double-spotted queenfish, Scomberoides lysan (Forsskal, 1775) (Indo-Pacific eastwards to Hawaiian Islands)
- Barred queenfish, Scomberoides tala (Cuvier, 1832) (Sri Lanka and east coast of India to Australia and the Solomon Islands)
- Needleskin queenfish, Scomberoides tol (Cuvier, 1832) (Indian Ocean to Japan and Australia, eastwards to Fiji)
- Oxeye scad, Selar boops (Cuvier, 1833) (tropical Indo-Pacific and eastern Atlantic)
- Purse-eye scad, Selar crumenophthalmus (Bloch, 1793) (worldwide in tropical and subtropical waters)
- Smooth tailed trevally, Selaroides leptolepis (Cuvier, 1833) (Persian Gulf eastwards to Australia and Japan)
- Amberjack, Seriola dumerili (Risso, 1810) (tropical Indo-Pacific and Atlantic)
- Yellowtail kingfish, Seriola lalandi Valenciennes, 1833 (Perth, Western Australia, to Capricorn group, Queensland, and northern Tasmania) (circumglobal restricted to subtropical and temperate waters)
- Almaco jack, Seriola rivoliana Valenciennes, 1833 (circumtropical, entering temperate waters in some areas)
- Black-banded kingfish, Seriolina nigrofasciata (Rueppell, 1829) (East Africa to Japan and Australia)
- Black-spotted dart, Trachinotus baillonii (Lacepede, 1801) (Indo-West Pacific from East Africa to the Marshall and Line Islands)
- Snub-nosed dart, Trachinotus blochii (Lacepede, 1801) (Indo-Pacific from East Africa to the Marshall Islands)
- Common dart, Trachinotus botla (Shaw, 1803) (East Africa to Australia)

Family Coryphaenidae – dolphinfishes

- Common dolphinfish, Coryphaena hippurus Linnaeus, 1758 (circumtropical)

Family Lutjanidae – snappers

- Small-toothed jobfish, Aphareus furca (Lacepede, 1802) (East Africa to Polynesia)
- Green jobfish, Aprion virescens Valenciennes, 1830 (East Africa and the Red sea to Polynesia)
- Hussar, Lutjanus adetii Castelnau, 1873 (eastern Australia and the Coral Sea)
- Mangrove jack, Lutjanus argentimaculatus (Forsskal, 1775) (East Africa and the Red Sea to Samoa - introduced to eastern Mediterranean)
- Red bass, Lutjanus bohar (Forsskal, 1775) (East Africa and the Red Sea to the Marquesas and Line Islands)
- Spanish flag, Lutjanus carponotatus (Richardson, 1842) (Andaman sea to Northern Australia)
- Checkered seaperch, Lutjanus decussatus (Cuvier, 1828) (Andaman Sea to Northern Australia)
- Black spot snapper, Lutjanus fulviflamma (Forsskal, 1775) (East Africa and the Red Sea to Samoa)
- Yellow margined seaperch, Lutjanus fulvus (Bloch & Schneider, 1801) (East Africa and the Red Sea to eastern Oceania - introduced in the Hawaiian Islands)
- Paddletail, Lutjanus gibbus (Forsskal, 1775) (East Africa and the Red Sea to southeastern Oceania)
- Bluestripe seaperch, Lutjanus kasmira (Forsskal, 1775) (East Africa to Polynesia - introduced in Hawaiian Islands)
- Dark-tailed seaperch, Lutjanus lemniscatus (Valenciennes, 1828) (Sri Lanka to Northern Australia)
- Bigeye seaperch, Lutjanus lutjanus (Bloch, 1790) (East Africa to Australia, Melanesia and Mariana Islands)
- Onespot seaperch, Lutjanus monostigma (Cuvier, 1828) (East Africa and Red Sea to the Marquesa and Line Islands)
- Five-lined seaperch, Lutjanus quinquelineatus (Bloch, 1790) (Persian Gulf to Fiji)
- Maori seaperch, Lutjanus rivulatus (Cuvier, 1828) (East Africa and Red Sea to Society Islands and north to Japan)
- Moses perch, Lutjanus russelli (Bleeker, 1849) (East Africa to Fiji)
- Red emperor, Lutjanus sebae (Cuvier, 1828) (East Africa to western Pacific)
- Black banded seaperch, Lutjanus semicinctus Quoy and Gaimard, 1824 (Indonesia to Fiji)
- Brownstripe seaperch, Lutjanus vitta (Quoy and Gaimard, 1824) (Seychelles to western Pacific)
- Midnight seaperch, Macolor macularis Fowler, 1931 (East Indies and Northern Australia to Ryukyu Islands)
- Black and white seaperch, Macolor niger (Forsskal, 1775) (East Africa to Samoa)
- Sailfin snapper, Symphorichthys spilurus (Guenther, 1874) (western Pacific from Northern Australia to Ryukyu Islands)
- Chinamanfish, Symphorus nematophorus (Bleeker, 1860) (western Pacific from Northern Australia to Ryukyu Islands)

Family Caesionidae – fusiliers

- Scissortail fusilier, Caesio caerulaurea Lacepede, 1801 (East Africa to Samoa)
- Red-bellied fusilier, Caesio cuning (Bloch, 1791) (Sri Lanka to New Caledonia, north to the Ryukyu Islands)
- Lunar fusilier, Caesio lunaris Cuvier, 1830 (East Africa to Melanesia)
- Blue and gold fusilier, Caesio teres Seale, 1906 (East Africa to the Line Islands and north to Japan)
- Marr's fusilier, Pterocaesio marri Schultz, 1953 (East Africa to the Marquesas and north to Japan)
- Neon fusilier, Pterocaesio tile (Cuvier, 1830) (East Africa to southeastern Oceania and north to Japan)
- Three lined fusilier, Pterocaesio trilineata Carpenter, 1987 (western and Central Pacific)

Family Lobotidae - tripletails

- Tripletail, Lobotes surinamensis (Bloch, 1790) (tropical and subtropical seas around the world)

Family Gerreidae – silverbiddies, silverbellies

- Oceanic silver biddy, Gerres longirostris (Lacepède, 1801) syn. Gerres acinaces Bleeker, 1854 ((as G. acinaces) East Africa and Red Sea to Samoa)

Family Haemulidae – sweetlips, grunts, grunter breams

- Painted sweetlips, Diagramma pictum (Thunberg, 1792) (East Africa and the Red Sea to New Caledonia, and north to Japan)
- Goldstriped sweetlips, Plectorhinchus chrysotaenia (Bleeker, 1855) (Indonesia to New Caledonia and north to the Ryukyu Islands)
- Many-spotted sweetlips, Plectorhinchus chaetodonoides (Lacepède, 1800) (Cocos-Keeling Islands to Samoa)
- Striped sweetlips, Plectorhinchus lessonii (Cuvier, 1830) (Malaysia to Melanesia and north to Japan)
- Goldspotted sweetlips, netted sweetlips, netted morwong, Plectorhinchus flavomaculatus (Ehrenberg, 1830) (tropical Australia south to Geographe Bay, Western Australia, and to Moruya, New South Wales - also widespread in the Indo-West Pacific region) (Cuvier, 1830) (East Africa and the Red Sea to western Pacific)
- Brown sweetlips, blubber-lip bream, Plectorhinchus gibbosus (Lacepède, 1802) (East Africa and the Red Sea to Samoa, and north to the Ryukyu Islands)
- Diagonal banded sweetlips, Plectorhinchus lineatus (Linnaeus, 1758) (western Pacific from Australia to the Ryukyu Islands)
- Giant sweetlips, Plectorhinchus albovittatus (Rueppell, 1838) (Red Sea to Fiji)
- Dotted sweetlips, Plectorhinchus picus (Cuvier, 1830) (Seychelles to Society Islands and north to Japan)
- Somber sweetlips, Plectorhinchus unicolor (Macleay, 1883) (Papua New Guinea to Queensland and the Great Barrier Reef)

Family Sparidae – breams

- Yellowfin bream, bream, silver bream, Acanthopagrus australis (Owen, 1853) (Lakes Entrance, Victoria, to Townsville, Queensland)
- Tarwhine, Rhabdosargus sarba (Forsskål, 1775) (Coral Bay to Albany, Western Australia, and Lakes Entrance, Victoria, to Queensland - also widespread overseas)
- Snapper, cockney bream, red bream, squire, old man, Pagrus auratus (Schneider, 1801) (Barrow Island, Western Australia, to Hinchinbrook Island, Queensland, and northern Tasmania - also New Zealand, Japan and the Indo-Malayan region)(Bloch and Schneider, 1801) (New Zealand and southern Australia north to the Capricorns)

Family Lethrinidae – emperors

- Gold-lined sea bream, Gnathodentex aureolineatus (Lacepède, 1802) (East Africa to the Taumotus)
- Collared sea bream, Gymnocranius audleyi Ogilby, 1916 (southern Queensland including southern part of the Great Barrier Reef)
- Japanese sea bream, Gymnocranius euanus Guenther, 1879 (Queensland to Tonga and north to Japan)
- Robinson's sea bream, Gymnocranius grandoculis (Valenciennes, 1830) (East Africa and the Red Sea to southeastern Oceania)
- Spotted sea bream, Gymnocranius sp. (Great Barrier Reef, Coral sea, New Caledonia, New Guinea and southern Japan)
- Yellow tailed emperor, Lethrinus atkinsoni Seale, 1909 (Indonesia to Taumotus, north to Japan)
- Bi-eye bream, Monotaxis grandoculis (Forsskal, 1775) (East Africa and the Red Sea to southeastern Oceania and Hawaiian Islands)

Family Nemipteridae – coral breams

- Japanese butterfish, Pentapodus nagasakiensis (Tanaka, 1915) (western Pacific from Japan to Northern Australia - reported from Lizard Island and Lihou Reef)
- Paradise butterfish, Pentapodus paradiseus (Guenther, 1859) (northeastern Australia to the Arafura sea)
- Blue butterfish, Pentapodus sp. (northeastern Australia to Fiji)
- Pale monocle bream, Scolopsis affinis Peters, 1877 (Indonesia and Philippines to Australia and Melanesia)
- Bridled monocle bream, Scolopsis bilineata (Bloch, 1793) (Andaman Sea to Fiji and north to Japan)
- Lined monocle bream, Scolopsis lineata Quoy & Gaimard, 1824 syn. Scolopsis cancellatus (Cocos-Keeling Islands to Polynesia)
- Pearly monocle bream, Scolopsis margaritifera (Cuvier, 1830) (Malay Peninsula to Melanesia and Northern Australia)
- Monocle bream, Scolopsis monogramma (Cuvier, 1830) (Andaman Sea to New Caledonia and north to Taiwan)
- Threelined monocle bream, Scolopsis trilineata Kner, 1868 (western Pacific to Samoa)

Family Mullidae – goatfishes, red mullet

- Yellowstripe goatfish, Mulloidichthys flavolineatus (Lacepede, 1801) syn. M. samoensis (Indo-Pacific)
- Yellowfin goatfish, Mulloidichthys vanicolensis (Valenciennes, 1831) (Indo-Pacific)
- Bicolour goatfish, Parupeneus barberinoides (Bleeker, 1852) (western Pacific east to Micronesia and Samoa)
- Dash-dot goatfish, Parupeneus barberinus (Lacepede, 1801) (Indo-Pacific)
- Doublebar goatfish, Parupeneus trifasciatus (Lacepède, 1801) syn. Parupeneus bifasciatus (Lacepede, 1801) ((as P. bifasciatus) Indo-Pacific)
- Cardinal goatfish, Parupeneus ciliatus (Lacepede, 1801) syn. P. fraterculus, P. pleurotaenia (Indo-Pacific)
- Goldsaddle goatfish, Parupeneus cyclostomus (Lacepede, 1801) syn. P. chryserydros, P. luteus (Indo-Pacific)
- Cinnabar goatfish, Parupeneus heptacanthus (Lacepede, 1801) syn. P. cinnabarensis, P. pleurospilos (East Africa to the Marshall Islands)
- Indian goatfish, Parupeneus indicus (Shaw, 1803) (East Africa to Samoa)
- Manybar goatfish, Parupeneus multifasciatus (Quoy & Gaimard, 1825) (central and western Pacific)
- Sidespot goatfish, Parupeneus pleurostigma (Bennett, 1830) (Indo-Pacific)
- Blacksaddle goatfish, blackspot goatfish, Parupeneus spilurus (Bleeker, 1854) syn. P. signatus (tropical Australia south to Geographe Bay, Western Australia, and to Mallacoota, Victoria - also Lord Howe Island, New Zealand and New Guinea) (northern New Zealand and New Caledonia to Western Australia)
- Bartail goatfish, freckled goatfish, Upeneus tragula Richardson, 1846 (tropical Australia south to Perth, Western Australia, and to Merimbula, New South Wales) (western Pacific to East Africa)

Family Pempheridae – bullseyes, sweepers

- Golden sweeper, Parapriacanthus ransonneti Steindachner, 1870 (western Pacific east to New Caledonia and Marshall Islands)
- Bronze sweeper, Pempheris analis Waite, 1910 (Kermadec Islands, Lord Howe Island, southern Great Barrier Reef and Western Australia)
- Copper sweeper, Pempheris otaitensis Lesson, 1830 (islands of Oceania and western Pacific to Western Australia and Christmas Island in the Indian Ocean)
- Silver sweeper, Pempheris schwenkii Bleeker, 1855 (Fiji and Vanuatu through Australia and Indonesia to East Africa)

Family Kyphosidae – drummers, rudderfishes

- Topsail drummer, Kyphosus cinerascens Forsskal, 1775 (East Africa and the Red Sea to Polynesia)
- Long finned drummer, Kyphosis vaigiensis (Quoy & Gaimard, 1825) (East Africa and the Red Sea to Polynesia)
- Stripey, Microcanthus strigatus (Cuvier, 1831) (antiequatorial, isolated populations in western and eastern Australia, and in the Hawaiian Island and Taiwan to Japan)

Family Ephippidae - batfishes

- Hump-headed batfish, Platax batavianus Cuvier, 1831 (Malay Peninsula to Northern Australia)
- Orbicular batfish, Platax orbicularis (Forsskal, 1775) (East Africa and the Red Sea to the Taumotus)
- Pinnate batfish, Platax pinnatus (Linnaeus, 1758) (western Pacific from the Ryukyu Islands to Australia)
- Teira batfish, Platax teira (Forsskal, 1775) (East Africa and the Red Sea to Melanesia)
- Short-finned batfish, Zabidius novemaculeatus (McCulloch, 1916) syn. Platax novemaculatus ((as P. novemaculatus) Northern Australia and southern New Guinea)

Family Chaetodontidae – butterflyfishes

- Bennett's butterflyfish, Chaetodon bennetti Cuvier, 1831 (East Africa to the Pitcairn Islands, and north to Japan)
- Speckled butterflyfish, Chaetodon citrinellus Cuvier, 1831 (East Africa to the Hawaiian Islands and Tuamotu archipelago)
- Saddled butterflyfish, Chaetodon ephippium Cuvier, 1831 (Cocos-Keeling Islands to the Hawaiian Islands and Tuamotu Archipelago)
- Dusky butterflyfish, Chaetodon flavirostris Guenther, 1873 (Great Barrier Reef to Pitcairn Islands)
- Gunther's butterflyfish, Chaetodon guentheri Ahl, 1913 (Merimbula, New South Wales, to Capricorn group, Queensland) (antiequatorial - Lord How Island and New South Wales - also Japan - sighted at Lizard Island)
- Klein's butterflyfish, Chaetodon kleinii Bloch, 1790 (East Africa and the Red Sea to Hawaiian Islands and Samoa)
- Lined butterflyfish, Chaetodon lineolatus Cuvier, 1831 (East Africa and the Red Sea to Polynesia)
- Raccoon butterflyfish, Chaetodon lunula (Lacepede, 1802) (East Africa to Polynesia)
- Blackback butterflyfish, Chaetodon melannotus Bloch & Schneider, 1801 (East Africa and the Red Sea to Samoa and north to Japan)
- Merten's butterflyfish, Chaetodon mertensii Cuvier, 1831 (Lord Howe Island and the Great Barrier Reef to the Ryukyu Islands and east to the Tuamotu Archipelago)
- Meyer's butterflyfish, Chaetodon meyeri Bloch & Schneider, 1801 (East Africa to the Line Islands)
- Spot-tail butterflyfish, Chaetodon ocellicaudus Cuvier, 1831 (East Indies, Philippines and northern Great Barrier Reef)
- Ornate butterflyfish, Chaetodon ornatissimus Cuvier, 1831 (Sri Lanka to Polynesia)
- Spotnape butterflyfish, Chaetodon oxycephalus Bleeker, 1851 (Sri Lanka to Queensland and north to the Philippines)
- Dot and dash butterflyfish, Chaetodon pelewensis Kner, 1868 (southern Oceania from Queensland to the Tuamotus)
- Bluespot butterflyfish, Chaetodon plebeius Cuvier, 1831 (Andaman sea to Fiji and north to Japan)
- Spot-banded butterflyfish, Chaetodon punctatofasciatus Cuvier, 1831 (Christmas Island (Indian Ocean) to the Line Islands)
- Latticed butterflyfish, Chaetodon rafflesii Bennett, 1830 (Sri Lanka to Taumotus and north to Japan)
- Rainford's Butterflyfish, Chaetodon rainfordi McCulloch, 1923 (Great Barrier Reef and inshore areas of the Queensland coast)
- Reticulated butterflyfish, Chaetodon reticulatus Cuvier, 1831 (Great Barrier Reef to Taiwan and east to Polynesia)
- Dotted butterflyfish, Chaetodon semeion Bleeker, 1855 (Maldive Islands to Tuamotus)
- Ovalspot butterflyfish, Chaetodon speculum Cuvier, 1831 (Christmas Island (Indian Ocean) to Tonga and north to Japan)
- Chevroned butterflyfish, Chaetodon trifascialis Quoy & Gaimard, 1825 (East Africa and the Red Sea to Hawaiian and Society Islands)
- Redfin butterflyfish, oval butterflyfish, Chaetodon trifasciatus Park, 1797 (East Africa to Hawaiian Islands and Tuamotu Archipelago)
- Pacific double-saddle butterflyfish, Chaetodon ulietensis Cuvier, 1831 (Cocos-Keeling Islands to Tuamotus and north to Japan)
- Teardrop butterflyfish, Chaetodon unimaculatus Bloch, 1787 (East Africa to Polynesia)
- Müller's coralfish, Chelmon muelleri (Klunzinger, 1879) (Northern Australia coastal reefs)
- Beaked coralfish, Chelmon rostratus (Linnaeus, 1758) (Andaman Sea to Australia and the Great Barrier Reef, north to the Ryukyu Islands)
- Highfin coralfish, Coradion altivelis McCulloch, 1916 (western Pacific from Australia north to Japan)
- Orange-banded coralfish, Coradion chrysozonus (Cuvier, 1831) (western Pacific from Australia north to the Ogasawara Islands)
- Forcepsfish, Forcipiger flavissimus Jordan & McGregor, 1898 (East Africa to Central America and Mexico)
- Longnose butterflyfish, Forcipiger longirostris (Broussonet, 1782) (East Africa to Polynesia)
- Pyramid butterflyfish, Hemitaurichthys polylepis (Bleeker, 1857) (Cocos-Keeling Islands to Hawaiian Islands and Pitcairn group)
- Longfin bannerfish, Heniochus acuminatus (Linnaeus, 1758) (East Africa and the Persian Gulf to the Society Islands)
- Pennant bannerfish, Heniochus chrysostomus Cuvier, 1831 syn. H. permutatus (Cocos-Keeling Islands to Pitcairn group)
- Schooling bannerfish, Heniochus diphreutes Jordan, 1903 (East Africa to the Hawaiian Islands)
- Masked bannerfish, Heniochus monoceros Cuvier, 1831 (East Africa to the Tuamotus)
- Singular bannerfish, Heniochus singularius Smith & Radcliffe, 1911 (Andaman Sea to Samoa and north to Japan)
- Humphead bannerfish, Heniochus varius (Cuvier, 1829) (Malay Peninsula to Samoa)
- Ocellated coralfish, Parachaetodon ocellatus (Cuvier, 1831) (Australia north to Ogasawara Islands)

Family Pomacanthidae - angelfishes

- Three-spot angelfish, Apolemichthys trimaculatus (Valenciennes, 1831) (East Africa to Samoa and north to Japan)
- Golden angelfish, Centropyge aurantia Randall & Wass, 1974 (northern Great Barrier Reef to Samoa)
- Bicolor angelfish, Centropyge bicolor (Bloch, 1787) (Christmas Island (Indian Ocean) to Samoa and north to Japan)
- Two-spined angelfish, Centropyge bispinosus (Guenther, 1860) (East Africa to Tuamotus and north to Izu Islands)
- White-tail angelfish, Centropyge flavicauda Fraser-Brunner, 1933 (Queensland and East Indies north to Japan and east to the Tuamotu Archipelago)
- Lemonpeel angelfish, Centropyge flavissima (Cuvier, 1831) (Cocos-Leeling Islands to southeastern Oceania and north to the Ryukyu Islands)
- Herald's angelfish, Centropyge heraldi Woods & Schultz, 1953 (Queensland to the Tuamotus and north to Taiwan)
- Flame angelfish, Centropyge loricula (Guenther, 1874) syn. C. flammeus (Oceanic coral reefs from Queensland to Samoa and the Hawaiian Islands)
- Multi-barred angelfish, Centropyge multifasciata (Smith & Radcliffe, 1911) (Cocos-Keeling Islands to Society Islands)
- Midnight angelfish, Centropyge nox (Bleeker, 1853) (Queensland and Melanesia north to the Ryukyu Islands)
- Keyhole angelfish, Centropyge tibicen (Cuvier, 1831) (Christmas Island (Indian Ocean) to Melanesia and north to Japan)
- Pearl-scaled angelfish, Centropyge vrolikii (Bleeker, 1853) (Christmas Island (Indian Ocean) to Melanesia and Micronesia)
- Conspicuous angelfish, Chaetodontoplus conspicillatus (Waite, 1900) (southern part of the Great Barrier Reef and Coral Sea)
- Scribbled angelfish, Chaetodontoplus duboulayi (Guenther, 1867) (Northern Australia and southern New Guinea - also reported from Japan)
- Queensland yellowtail angelfish, Chaetodontoplus meredithi Kuiter, 1990 (Queensland coastal and inner reefs)
- Lamarck's angelfish, Genicanthus lamarck (Lacepede, 1802) (East Africa and Indonesia to Queensland and Solomon Islands, and north to Japan. Recorded from Escape Reef on the northern Great Barrier Reef)
- Black-spot angelfish, Genicanthus melanospilos (Bleeker, 1857) (Queensland to Fiji and north to the Ryukyu Islands)
- Watanabe's angelfish, Genicanthus watanabei (Yasuda & Tominaga, 1970) (Queensland to Tuamotus and north to Taiwan)
- Emperor angelfish, Pomacanthus imperator (Bloch, 1787) (East Africa and the Red Sea to the Tuamotus and north to Japan)
- Blue-girdled angelfish, Pomacanthus navarchus (Cuvier, 1831) (Indonesia and Philippines to northern Queensland)
- Semicircle angelfish, Pomacanthus semicirculatus (Cuvier, 1831) (East Africa to Samoa)
- Six-banded angelfish, Pomacanthus sexstriatus (Cuvier, 1831) (Malaysia to Solomon Islands and north to Ryukyu Islands)
- Yellowmask angelfish, Pomacanthus xanthometopon (Bleeker, 1853) (Maldive Islands to Vanuatu and north to Yaeyama Islands)
- Regal angelfish, Pygoplites diacanthus (Boddaert, 1772) (East Africa and the Red Sea to the Tuamotus and north to the Ryukyu Islands)

Family Pomacentridae – damselfishes

- Bengal sergeant, Abudefduf bengalensis (Bloch, 1787) (northeastern Indian Ocean and western Pacific)
- Banded sergeant, Abudefduf septemfasciatus (Cuvier, 1830) (East Africa to Tuamotu Archipelago and Line Islands)
- Scissor-tail sergeant, Abudefduf sexfasciatus (Lacepede, 1802) (East Africa and the Red Sea to the Tuamotus)
- Blackspot sergeant, Abudefduf sordidus (Forsskal, 1775) (East Africa and the Red Sea to Polynesia)
- Indo-Pacific sergeant, Abudefduf vaigiensis (Quoy & Gaimard, 1825) (East Africa and the Red Sea to the Marquesas)
- Whitley's sergeant, Abudefduf whitleyi Allen & Robertson, 1974 (Great Barrier Reef, Coral Sea and New Caledonia)
- Spiny chromis, Acanthochromis polyacanthus (Bleeker, 1855) (Indonesia and the Philippines to northeastern Australia and Melanesia)
- Golden damsel, Amblyglyphidodon aureus (Cuvier, 1830) (eastern Indian Ocean and western Pacific)
- Staghorn damsel, Amblyglyphidodon curacao (Bloch, 1787) (eastern Indian Ocean and western Pacific)
- White-belly damsel, Amblyglyphidodon leucogaster (Bleeker, 1847) (Red Sea to Samoa)
- Black banded demoiselle, Amblypomacentrus breviceps (Schlegel & Mueller, 1839)
- Barrier reef anemonefish, Amphiprion akindynos (Allen, 1972) (Southwestern Pacific, including Great Barrier Reef and Coral Sea, northern New South Wales, New Caledonia and Loyalty Islands)
- Orange-fin anemonefish, Amphiprion chrysopterus Cuvier, 1830 (Queensland and New Guinea to Tuamotus and Marshall Islands)
- Clark's anemone fish, Amphiprion clarkii (Bennett, 1830) (Persian Gulf to Vanuatu and Marshall Islands)
- Red and black anemonefish, Amphiprion melanopus Bleeker, 1852 (Indonesia to the Society and Marshall Islands)
- Clown anemonefish, Amphiprion percula (Lacepede, 1802) (Queensland and Melanesia)
- Pink anemonefish, Amphiprion perideraion Bleeker, 1855 (western Pacific including Melanesia and Micronesia ranging north to Japan)
- Big-lip damsel, Cheiloprion labiatus (Day, 1877) (Andaman Sea to Northern Australia and Melanesia)
- Midget chromis, Chromis acares Randall & Swerdloff, 1973 (Coral Sea to Society islands and Johnston Island)
- Agile chromis, Chromis agilis Smith, 1960 (East Africa to the Hawaiian Islands and Pitcairn group)
- Yellow speckled chromis, Chromis alpha Randall, 1988 (Christmas Island (Indian Ocean) to Society Islands)
- Ambon chromis, Chromis amboinensis (Bleeker, 1873) (Cocos-Keeling Islands to Samoa and Marshall Islands)
- Yellow chromis, Chromis analis (Cuvier, 1830) (Indonesia to Fiji and Mariana Islands)
- Black-axil chromis, Chromis atripectoralis Welander & Schultz, 1951 (Seychelles to Tuamotus)
- Dark-fin chromis, Chromis atripes Fowler & Bean, 1928 (Cocos-Keeling Islands to Kiribati)
- Stout body chromis, Chromis chrysura (Bliss, 1883) (three isolated antitropical populations at Southwestern Pacific, Japan to Taiwan and Mauritius to Reunion)
- Deep reef chromis, Chromis delta Randall, 1988 (Cocos Keeling Islands to Fiji)
- Twin-spot chromis, Chromis elerae Fowler & Bean, 1928 (Maldive Islands to Fiji and Marshall Islands)
- Yellow-spotted chromis, Chromis flavomaculata Kamohara, 1960 (antiequatorial distribution with two isolated populations: Lord Howe Island, Coral Sea New Caledonia and Loyalty Islands, and Japan to Taiwan)
- Half and half chromis, Chromis iomelas Jordan & Seale, 1906 (Great Barrier Reef and northern New Guinea to Samoa and the Society Islands)
- Scaly chromis, Chromis lepidolepis Bleeker, 1877 (Rast Africa and the Red Sea to Fuji and the Line Islands)
- Bicolour chromis, Chromis margaritifer Fowler, 1946 (Cocos-Keeling Islands to the Tuamotus)
- Barrier Reef chromis, Chromis nitida (Whitley, 1928) (southern and central Great Barrier Reef, Rare or absent in other parts of the Coral Sea)
- Black-bar chromis, Chromis retrofasciata Weber, 1913 (Indonesia and the Philippines to Fiji)
- Ternate chromis, Chromis ternatensis (Bleeker, 1856) (East Africa to Fiji and Marshall Islands)
- Vanderbilt's chromis, Chromis vanderbilti (Fowler, 1941) (scattered localities in the western and central Pacific)
- Blue-green chromis, Chromis viridis (Cuvier, 1830) (East Africa and the Red Sea to the Tuamotu Archipelago and Line Islands)
- Weber's chromis, Chromis weberi Fowler & Bean, 1928 (East Africa and the Red Sea to the Line Islands and Pitcairn group)
- Yellow-axil chromis, Chromis xanthochira (Bleeker, 1851) (Indonesia and Philippines to northeastern Australia and Melanesia)
- Pale-tail chromis, Chromis xanthura (Bleeker, 1854) (Cocos-Keeling Islands to southeastern Oceania)
- Two-spot demoiselle, Chrysiptera biocellata (Quoy & Gaimard, 1824) (East Africa to Samoa and Marshall Islands)
- Blueline demoiselle, Chrysiptera caeruleolineata (Allen, 1973) (Coral Sea to Samoa and Marshall Islands)
- Blue devil, Chrysiptera cyanea (Quoy & Gaimard, 1824) (Indonesia to Vanuatu and Palau and north to the Ryukyu Islands - fairly common on the Great Barrier Reef but absent from other parts of the Coral Sea)
- Yellowfin damsel, Chrysiptera flavipinnis (Allen & Robertson, 1974) (Southwestern Pacific including New Guinea, eastern Australia and the Coral Sea)
- Grey damsel, Chrysiptera glauca (Cuvier, 1830) (East Africa to the Pitcairn group and Line Islands)
- Surge demoiselle, Chrysiptera brownriggii (Bennett, 1828) (East Africa to the Marquesas and Line Islands)
- King demoiselle, Chrysiptera rex (Snyder, 1909) (Indonesia and the Philippines to northeastern Australia and Melanesia)
- Rolland's demoiselle, Chrysiptera rollandi (Whitley, 1961) (Malay Peninsula to northeastern Australia and Melanesia)
- Starck's demoiselle, Chrysiptera starcki (Allen, 1973) (antiequatorial distribution in the western Pacific: New Caledonia to Queensland, and Taiwan to the Ryukyu Islands)
- Talbot's demoiselle, Chrysiptera talboti (Allen, 1975) (Malay Peninsula to northeastern Australia and Melanesia)
- South seas demoiselle, Chrysiptera taupou (Jordan & Seale, 1906) (Southwestern Pacific, including Australia, to Fiji and Samoa)
- Threeband demoiselle, Chrysiptera tricincta (Allen & Randall, 1974) (antiequatorial distribution in western Pacific: Coral Sea to Samoa, and Ryukyu Islands)
- Onespot demoiselle, Chrysiptera unimaculata (Cuvier, 1830) (East Africa and the Red Sea to Fiji)
- Humbug dascyllus, Dascyllus aruanus (Linnaeus, 1758) (East Africa and the Red Sea to the Line Islands and southeastern Polynesia)
- Black tailed dascyllus, Dascyllus melanurus Bleeker, 1854 (Malay Peninsula to northeastern Australia and Melanesia)
- Reticulated dascyllus, Dascyllus reticulatus (Richardson, 1846) (Cocos-Keeling Islands to Samoa)
- Three-spot dascyllus, Dascyllus trimaculatus (Rueppell, 1828) (East Africa and the Red Sea to the Line Islands and Pitcairn group)
- Black vent damsel, Dischistodus melanotus (Bleeker, 1853) syn. D. notopthalmus (Indonesia and the Philippines to Northern Australia and the Solomon Islands)
- White damsel, Dischistodus perspicillatus (Cuvier, 1830) (eastern Indian Ocean and western Pacific)
- Honey-head damsel, Dischistodus prosopotaenia (Bleeker, 1852) (Andaman Sea to Northern Australia and Melanesia)
- Monarch damsel, Dischistodus pseudochrysopoecilus (Allen & Robertson, 1974) (Philippines to Northern Australia and Melanesia)
- Lagoon damsel, Hemiglyphidodon plagiometopon (Bleeker, 1852) (Andaman Sea to Queensland and the Solomon Islands, and north to China - northern Great Barrier Reef, apparently absent from the rest of the Coral Sea)
- Fusilier damsel, Lepidozygus tapeinosoma (Bleeker, 1856) (East Africa to the Tuamotus, Marquesas and Line Islands)
- Yellowtail damsel, Neopomacentrus azysron (Bleeker, 1877) (East Africa to New Caledonia)
- Chinese demoiselle, Neopomacentrus bankieri (Richardson, 1846) (South China Sea and Java Sea to northeastern Australia)
- Regal demoiselle, Neopomacentrus cyanomos (Bleeker, 1856) (East Africa to Northern Australia and Melanesia)
- Black demoiselle, Neoglyphidodon melas (Cuvier, 1830) (East Africa and the Red Sea to Vanuatu and north to the Ryukyu Islands)
- Yellowfin damsel, Neoglyphidodon nigroris (Cuvier, 1830) (Andaman Sea to Vanuatu, and north to the Ryukyu Islands)
- Multispine damselfish, Neoglyphidodon polyacanthus (Ogilby, 1889) (Southernmost Great Barrier Reef, Lord Howe Island, Norfolk Island and New Caledonia)
- Bigscale scalyfin, Parma oligolepis Whitley, 1929 (Sydney, New South Wales, to Cairns, Queensland) (northern New South Wales to Cape Tribulation on the Cape Yorke Peninsula)
- Banded scalyfin, Parma polylepis Günther, 1862 (Bass Point, New South Wales, to Capricorn group, Queensland - also Lord Howe Island, Norfolk Island and New Caledonia) (Southernmost Great Barrier Reef, New South Wales, Lord Howe Island, Norfolk Island and New Caledonia)
- Dick's damsel, Plectroglyphidodon dickii (Lienard, 1839) (East Africa to the Tuamotus and Line Islands)
- Brighteye damsel, Plectroglyphidodon imparipennis (Vaillant & Sauvage, 1875) (East Africa to the Pitcairn group and Hawaiian Islands)
- Johnston damsel, Plectroglyphidodon johnstonianus Fowler & Ball, 1924 (East Africa to Pitcairn group and Hawaiian Islands)
- Jewel damsel, Plectroglyphidodon lacrymatus (Quoy & Gaimard, 1824) (East Africa and the Red Sea to the Society Islands and Marshall Islands)
- Whiteband damsel, Plectroglyphidodon leucozonus (Bleeker, 1859) (East Africa to Pitcairn group and Marshall Islands)
- Phoenix damsel, Plectroglyphidodon phoenixensis (Schultz, 1943) (East Africa to the Tuamotus and Marshall Islands)
- Ambon damsel, Pomacentrus amboinensis Bleeker, 1868 (Andaman Sea to northeastern Australia and Melanesia)
- Australian damsel, Pomacentrus australis Allen & Robertson, 1973 (Great Barrier Reef south to Sydney)
- Speckled damsel, Pomacentrus bankanensis Bleeker, 1853 (Christmas Island, (Indian Ocean) to Fiji and north to Japan)
- Charcoal damsel, Pomacentrus brachialis Cuvier, 1830 (western Pacific to Fiji and Samoa)
- Whitetail damsel, Pomacentrus chrysurus Cuvier, 1830 syn. P. rhodonotus, P. flavicauda (Maldive Islands to the Coral Sea - also Melanesia and Micronesia)
- Neon damsel, Pomacentrus coelestis Jordan & Starks, 1901 (Cocos-Leeling Islands to Tuamotus)
- Bluespot damsel, Pomacentrus grammorhynchus Fowler, 1918 (Indonesia and Philippines to northeastern Australia and Melanesia)
- Imitator damsel, Pomacentrus imitator (Whitley, 1964) (rare on Great Barrier Reef, but common in other parts of the Coral sea - also New Caledonia, Rotuma and Fiji)
- Scaly damsel, Pomacentrus lepidogenys Fowler & Ball, 1928 (Malay Peninsula to Fiji)
- Lemon damsel, Pomacentrus moluccensis Bleeker, 1853 syn. P. popei (Andaman Sea to Fiji and north to Ryukyu Islands)
- Sandy damsel, Pomacentrus nagasakiensis Tanaka, 1917 syn. P. arenarius (Indonesia to Coral Sea and Vanuatu, north to Japan)
- Blackmargined damsel, Pomacentrus nigromarginatus Allen, 1973 (Indonesia to Coral Sea and Solomon Islands, north to Ryukyu Islands)
- Blue damsel, Pomacentrus pavo (Bloch, 1787) (East Africa to the Tuamotus and Marshall Islands)
- Philippine damsel, Pomacentrus philippinus Evermann & Seale, 1907 (Maldive Islands to Fiji)
- Reid's damsel, Pomacentrus reidi Fowler & Bean, 1928 (Indonesia and Philippines to northeastern Australia and Melanesia)
- Threespot damsel, Pomacentrus tripunctatus Cuvier, 1830 (Sri Lanka to northeastern Australia and Melanesia)
- Princess damsel, Pomacentrus vaiuli Jordan & Seale, 1906 (Molucca Islands to Samoa and north to Japan)
- Ward's damsel, Pomacentrus wardi Whitley, 1927 (Great Barrier Reef and eastern Australian coast south to Sydney)
- Richardson's reef-damsel, Pomachromis richardsoni (Snyder, 1909) (Mauritius to Fiji)
- Spine cheek anemonefish, Premnas biaculeatus (Bloch, 1790) (Malay peninsula to northeastern Australia and Melanesia)
- Gulf damsel, Pristotis obtusirostris (Guenther, 1862) syn. P. jerdoni (Persian Gulf and Red Sea to Australia, north to Ryukyu Islands)
- Whitebar gregory, Stegastes albifasciatus (Schlegel & Mueller, 1839) (East Africa to the Tuamotus and Line Islands)
- Australian gregory, Stegastes apicalis (De Vis, 1885) (Great Barrier Reef and eastern coast of Australia to Sydney)
- Pacific gregory, Stegastes fasciolatus (Ogilby, 1889) syn. S. jenkinsi (East Africa to Hawaiian Islands and Easter Island)
- Coral Sea gregory, Stegastes gascoynei (Whitley, 1964) (Coral Sea and northern Tasman Sea)
- Bluntsnout gregory, Stegastes lividus (Forster in Bloch & Schneider, 1801)
- Dusky gregory, Stegastes nigricans (Lecepede, 1802) (East Africa and the Red Sea to the Tuamotus, Marquesas and Line Islands)

Family Cirrhitidae – hawkfishes

- Twinspot hawkfish, Amblycirrhitus bimacula Jenkins, 1903 (Indo-Pacific)
- Threadfin hawkfish, blotched hawkfish, Cirrhitichthys aprinus (Cuvier, 1829) (tropical Australia south to Houtman Abrolhos, Western Australia, and to Merimbula, New South Wales - also widespread in the Indo-West Pacific region) (western Pacific)
- Dwarf hawkfish, Cirrhitichthys falco Randall, 1963 (Maldives through western Pacific to Mariana Islands, Caroline Islands and Samoa)
- Pixy hawkfish, Cirrhitichthys oxycephalus (Bleeker, 1855) (Indo-Pacific and tropical eastern Pacific)
- Stocky hawkfish, Cirrhitus pinnulatus (Schneider, 1801) (Indo-Pacific)
- Swallowtail hawkfish, Cyprinocirrhites polyactis (Bleeker, 1875) (Indo-Pacific)
- Flame hawkfish, Neocirrhites armatus Castelnau, 1873 (islands of Oceania and western Pacific)
- Longnose hawkfish, Oxycirrhites typus Bleeker, 1857 (Indo-Pacific and tropical eastern Pacific)
- Arc-eye hawkfish, Paracirrhites arcatus (Cuvier, 1829) (Indo-Pacific)
- Blackside hawkfish, Paracirrhites forsteri (Schneider, 1801) (Indo-Pacific)
- Halfspotted hawkfish, Paracirrhites hemistictus (Guenther, 1874) syn. P. polystictus (islands of Oceania, Great Barrier Reef and Christmas and Cocos-Keeling Islands)

Family Sphyraenidae – pikes, barracudas

- Great barracuda, Sphyraena barracuda (Walbaum, 1792) (East Africa and the Red Sea to Hawaiian Islands and the Tuamotu archipelago)
- Yellowtail barracuda, Sphyraena flavicauda Rueppell, 1838 (Indo-Pacific)
- Bigeye barracuda, Sphyraena forsteri Cuvier, 1829 (East Africa to the Society Islands)
- Heller's barracuda, Sphyraena helleri Jenkins, 1901 (western Pacific including the Coral Sea to Hawaiian Islands)
- Pickhandle barracuda, Sphyraena jello Cuvier, 1829 (East Africa and the Red Sea to western Pacific)
- Chevron barracuda, Sphyraena qenie Klunzinger, 1870 (East Africa and the Red Sea to western Pacific)

Family Polynemidae - threadfins

- Six-fingered threadfin, Polydactylus sexfilis (Valenciennes, 1831) (India to Hawaiian Islands and Tuamotu archipelago)

Family Labridae - wrasses

- Bluespotted wrasse, Anampses caeruleopunctatus Rueppell, 1829 syn. A. diadematus (Indo-Pacific)
- Feminine wrasse, Anampses femininus Randall, 1972 (southern subtropical Pacific from Easter Island to New Caledonia and the Great Barrier Reef)
- Geographic wrasse, Anampses geographicus Valenciennes, 1840 syn. A. pterophthalmus (Western Australia and western Pacific east to the Caroline Islands and Fiji)
- Spotted wrasse, Anampses meleagrides Valenciennes, 1840 syn. A. amboinensis (East Africa and the Red Sea to Samoa and the Caroline Islands)
- New Guinea wrasse, Anampses neoguinaicus Bleeker, 1878 (western Pacific, east to Fiji)
- Yellowbreasted wrasse, Anampses twistii Bleeker, 1856 (Indo-Pacific)
- Lyretail hogfish, Bodianus anthioides (Bennett, 1830) (Indo-Pacific)
- Axilspot hogfish, Bodianus axillaris (Bennett, 1831) (East Africa and the Red Sea to Samoa and the Marshall Islands)
- Twospot hogfish, Bodianus bimaculatus Allen, 1973 (Mauritius and the Maldives to the western Pacific)
- Diana's pigfish, Diana's hogfish, Bodianus diana (Lacépède, 1801) syn. Lepidapolois aldabraensis (tropical Australia south to Montague Island, New South Wales - also widespread in the Indo-Pacific region) (East Africa and the Red Sea to Samoa and the Marshall Islands)
- Blackfin hogfish, Bodianus loxozonus (Snyder, 1908) (western Pacific to French Polynesia)
- Splitlevel hogfish, Bodianus mesothorax (Bloch & Scneider, 1801) (western Pacific to Fiji)
- Goldspot hogfish, Bodianus perditio (Quoy & Gaimard, 1834) (antiequatorial: southern Africa to islands of southern Oceania, and Taiwan to southern Japan)
- Floral Maori wrasse, Cheilinus chlorourus (Bloch, 1791) (Indo-Pacific)
- Redbreasted Maori wrasse, Cheilinus fasciatus (Bloch, 1791) (East Africa and the Red Sea to Samoa and Micronesia)
- Snooty Maori wrasse, Cheilinus oxycephalus Bleeker, 1853 (Indo-Pacific)
- Tripletail Maori wrasse, Cheilinus trilobatus Lacepede, 1801 (Indo-Pacific)
- Humphead Maori wrasse, Cheilinus undulatus Rueppell, 1835 (Indo-Pacific)
- Cigar wrasse, Cheilio inermis (Forsskal, 1775) (Indo-Pacific)
- Anchor tuskfish, Choerodon anchorago (Bloch, 1791) (Sri Lanka to western Pacific)
- Grass tuskfish, Choerodon cephalotes (Castelnau, 1975) (Indonesia to Queensland)
- Blue tuskfish, Choerodon cyanodus (Richardson, 1843) syn. Choerops albigena (Western Australia to Queensland)
- Harlequin tuskfish, Choerodon fasciatus (Guenther, 1867) (antiequatorial; Taiwan to Ryukyu Islands and Queensland to New Caledonia)
- Graphic tuskfish, Choerodon graphicus (De Vis, 1885) syn. C. transversalis (Queensland to New Caledonia)
- Blackspot tuskfish, Choerodon schoenleinii (Valenciennes, 1839) (Western Australia to western Pacific)
- Venus tuskfish, Choerodon venustus (De Vis, 1884) (northern New South Wales to Queensland)
- Exquisite wrasse, Cirrhilabrus exquisitus Smith, 1957 (Indo-Pacific)
- Magenta streaked wrasse, Cirrhilabrus laboutei Randall & Lubbock, 1982 (Great Barrier Reef to New Caledonia and the Loyalty Islands)
- Purplelined wrasse, Cirrhilabrus lineatus Randall & Lubbock, 1982 (Great Barrier Reef to New Caledonia and the Loyalty Islands)
- Dotted wrasse, Cirrhilabrus punctatus Randall & Kuiter, 1989 (New South Wales to southern New Guinea, and east to Fiji)
- Scott's wrasse, Cirrhilabrus scottorum Randall & Pyle, 1989 (south Pacific from the Great Barrier Reef to the Pitcairn group)
- Goldlined coris, Coris aurilineata Randall & Kuiter, 1982 (New South Wales to the southern Great Barrier Reef)
- Clown coris, Coris aygula Lacepede, 1801 syn. Coris angulata (Indo-Pacific)
- Pale-barred coris, Coris dorsomacula Fowler, 1908 syn. Coris dorsomaculata ((as C. dorsomaculata) western Pacific)
- Yellowtail coris, Coris gaimard (Quoy & Gaimard, 1824) (central and western Pacific)
- Blackspot coris, Coris pictoides Randall & Kuiter, 1982 (known from New South Wales, Great Barrier Reef, Western Australia, Indonesia and the Philippines)
- Batu coris, Coris batuensis (Bleeker, 1857) (western Indian Ocean to the Marshall Islands and Tonga)
- Knifefish, Cymolutes praetextatus (Quoy & Gaimard, 1834) (Indo-Pacific except Hawaii)
- Collared knifefish, Cymolutes torquatus Valenciennes, 1840 (Indo-Pacific)
- Yellowtail tubelip, Diproctacanthus xanthurus (Bleeker, 1856) (Philippines, Palau, Indonesia, New Guinea and the Great Barrier Reef)
- Slingjaw wrasse, Epibulus insidiator (Pallas, 1770) (Indo-Pacific)
- Bird wrasse, Gomphosus varius Lacepede, 1801 syn. G. tricolor (Oceania and the western Pacific)
- Biocellate wrasse, Halichoeres biocellatus Schultz, 1960 (western Pacific to Samoa and Marshall Islands)
- Pastel-green wrasse, Halichoeres chloropterus (Bloch, 1791) syn. H. gymnocephalus (Philippines to Great Barrier Reef)
- Golden wrasse, Halichoeres chrysus Randall, 1981 (Christmas Island (Indian Ocean), western Pacific and Micronesia)
- Goldstripe wrasse, Halichoeres hartzfeldii (Bleeker, 1852) (Red sea, Persian Gulf and western Indian Ocean to the western Pacific)
- Checkerboard wrasse, Halichoeres hortulanus (Lacepede, 1801) syn. H. centiquadrus (Indo-Pacific)
- Pink-belly wrasse, Halichoeres margaritaceus (Valenciennes, 1839) (western and central Pacific)
- Dusky wrasse, Halichoeres marginatus Rueppell, 1835 (Indo-Pacific)
- Tailspot wrasse, Halichoeres melanurus (Bleeker, 1851) (western Pacific east to Micronesia and Samoa)
- Ocellated wrasse, Halichoeres melasmapomus Randall, 1980 (islands of Oceania except Hawaii and Easter Island, and from the Philippines to the Red Sea - also recorded from Christmas Island (Indian Ocean) and the Cocos-Keeling Islands)
- Circle-cheek wrasse, Halichoeres miniatus (Valenciennes, 1839) (western Pacific)
- Nebulous wrasse, Halichoeres nebulosus (Valenciennes, 1839) (Red Sea and tropical and subtropical Indian Ocean to the western Pacific)
- Ornate wrasse, Halichoeres ornatissimus (Garrett, 1863) (western Pacific and islands of Oceania)
- Twotone wrasse, Halichoeres prosopeion (Bleeker, 1853) (western Pacific to Samoa, and Palau)
- Zigzag wrasse, Halichoeres scapularis (Bennett, 1831) (East Africa and the Red Sea to the western Pacific)
- Threespot wrasse, Halichoeres trimaculatus (Quoy & Gaimard, 1834) (western Pacific and islands of Oceania, and Christmas Island (Indian Ocean))
- Barred thicklip, Hemigymnus fasciatus (Bloch, 1792) (Indo-Pacific)
- Blackeye thicklip, Hemigymnus melapterus (Bloch, 1791) (East Africa and the Red Sea to Micronesia and Samoa)
- Ringwrasse, Hologymnosus annulatus (Lacepede, 1801) syn. H. semidiscus (Indo-Pacific)
- Pastel ringwrasse, Hologymnosus doliatus (Lacepede, 1801) (East Africa to Samoa and the Line Islands)
- Sidespot ringwrasse, Hologymnosus longipes (Guenther, 1862) (southern Great Barrier Reef, New Caledonia, Loyalty Islands and Vanuatu)
- Whitepatch razorfish, Iniistius aneitensis (Günther, 1862) syn. Xyrichthys aneitensis ((as X. aneitensis) western and central Pacific)
- Peacock razorfish, Iniistius pavo (Valenciennes, 1840) syn. Xyrichtys pavo ((as X. pavo) Indo-Pacific)
- Tubelip wrasse, Labrichthys unilineatus (Guichenot, 1847) syn. L. cyanotaenia (East Africa to Micronesia and Samoa)
- Bicolor cleaner wrasse, Labroides bicolor Fowler & Bean, 1928 (Indo-Pacific)
- Striped cleaner wrasse, Labroides dimidiatus (Valenciennes, 1839) (Indo-Pacific)
- Breastspot cleaner wrasse, Labroides pectoralis Randall & Springer, 1975 (Indonesia and the Great Barrier Reef to Micronesia and New Caledonia - also Christmas Island (Indian Ocean))
- Southern tubelip, Labropsis australis Randall, 1981 (Great Barrier Reef and Solomon Islands to Fiji and Samoa)
- Yellowback tubelip, Labropsis xanthonota Randall, 1981 (East Africa to Micronesia and Samoa)
- Shoulderspot wrasse, Leptojulis cyanopleura (Bleeker, 1853) (Gulf of Oman to Philippines and Great Barrier Reef)
- Choat's wrasse, Macropharyngodon choati Randall, 1978 (southern Great Barrier Reef)
- Kuiter's wrasse, Macropharyngodon kuiteri Randall, 1978 (New South Wales and southern Great Barrier Reef to New Caledonia)
- Blackspotted wrasse, Macropharyngodon meleagris (Valenciennes, 1839) syn. Leptojulis pardalis (Cocos-Keeling Islands to western Pacific and the islands of Oceania)
- Black wrasse, Macropharyngodon negrosensis Herre, 1932 (western Pacific)
- Rockmover wrasse, Novaculichthys taeniourus (Lacepede, 1801) (Indo-Pacific)
- Twospot Maori wrasse, Oxycheilinus bimaculatis (Valenciennes, 1840) (Indo-Pacific)
- Cheeklined Maori wrasse, Oxycheilinus digramma (Lacepede, 1801) (East Africa and the Red Sea to Samoa and the Marshall Islands)
- Ringtail Maori wrasse, Oxycheilinus unifasciatus (Streets, 1877) (central and western Pacific, Hawaii)
- Disappearing wrasse, Pseudocheilinus evanidus Jordan & Evermann, 1903 (Indo-Pacific)
- Sixstripe wrasse, Pseudocheilinus hexataenia (Bleeker, 1857) (Indo-Pacific)
- Eightstripe wrasse, Pseudocheilinus octotaenia Jenkins, 1900 (Indo-Pacific)
- Redspot wrasse, Pseudocoris yamashiroi (Schmidt, 1930) (western Pacific to Micronesia and Samoa)
- Chiseltooth wrasse, Pseudodax moluccanus (Valenciennes, 1839) (Indo-Pacific)
- Smalltail wrasse, Pseudojuloides cerasinus (Snyder, 1904) (Indo-Pacific)
- Gunther's wrasse, Pseudolabrus guentheri Bleeker, 1862 (Montague Island, New South Wales, to Whitsunday group, Queensland) (New South Wales to southern Great Barrier Reef)
- Redstriped wrasse, Pteragogus enneacanthus (Bleeker, 1853) syn. P. amboinensis (Indonesia to the Coral Sea)
- Cryptic wrasse, Pteragogus cryptus Randall, 1981 (Red Sea and western Pacific to Micronesia and Samoa)
- Bluelined wrasse, Stethojulis bandanensis (Bleeker, 1851) syn. S. rubromaculata, S. linearis (western Pacific and islands of Oceania and the eastern Pacific except Hawaii)
- Cutribbon wrasse, Stethojulis interrupta (Bleeker, 1851) syn. S. kalosoma (East Africa to Samoa and the Mariana Islands)
- Stripebelly wrasse, Stethojulis strigiventer (Bennett, 1832) syn. S. renardi (East Africa to Micronesia and Samoa)
- Three-ribbon wrasse, Stethojulis trilineata (Bloch & Schneider, 1801) syn. S. phekadopleura (Maldives to western Pacific)
- Slender wrasse, Suezichthys gracilis (Steindachner & Doederlein, 1887) (antitropical, known from southern Japan, Korea and Taiwan in the north and New South Wales and the southern Great Barrier Reef to New Caledonia in the south)
- Bluntheaded wrasse, Thalassoma amblycephalum (Bleeker, 1856) syn. T. melanochir (Indo-Pacific)
- Sixbar wrasse, Thalassoma hardwicke (Bennett, 1828) syn. T. schwanefeldii (Indo-Pacific)
- Jansen's wrasse, Thalassoma jansenii (Bleeker, 1856) (Maldives to the western Pacific and Fiji)
- Moon wrasse, Thalassoma lunare (Linnaeus, 1758) (Indo-Pacific)
- Sunset wrasse, Thalassoma lutescens (Lay & Bennett, 1839) (Indo-Pacific and Clipperton Island in the eastern Pacific, but apparently absent from the Indo-Malayan region and southern Indian Ocean)
- Surge wrasse, Thalassoma purpureum (Forsskal, 1775) syn. T. umbrostygma (Indo-Pacific)
- Fivestripe wrasse, Thalassoma quinquevittatum (Lay & Bennett, 1839) (Indo-Pacific)
- Ladder wrasse, Thalassoma trilobatum (Lacepede, 1801) (Indo-Pacific)
- Whitebanded sharpnose wrasse, Wetmorella albofasciata (Schultz & Marshall, 1954) (Indo-Pacific)
- Sharpnose wrasse, Wetmorella nigropinnata (Seale, 1901) syn. W. philippinus, W. ocellata, W. triocellata (Indo-Pacific)
- Fivefinger razorfish, Xyrichthys pentadactylus (Linnaeus, 1758) (East Africa and the Red Sea to the western Pacific)

Family Scaridae - parrotfishes

- Bumphead parrotfish, Bolbometopon muricatum (Valenciennes, 1840) (East Africa and the Red Sea to Samoa and the Line Islands in the central Pacific)
- Stareye parrotfish, Calotomus carolinus (Valenciennes, 1840) syn. C. sandwicensis (Indo-Pacific and tropical east Pacific)
- Raggedtooth parrotfish, Calotomus spinidens (Quoy & Gaimard, 1824) (East Africa to Tonga and the Marshall Islands)
- Bicolour parrotfish, Cetoscarus bicolor (Rueppell, 1829) syn. Scarus pulchellus (Indo-Pacific)
- Bleeker's parrotfish, Chlorurus bleekeri (de Beaufort, 1940) syn. S. bleekeri ((as S. bleekeri) western Pacific to Fiji and the islands of Micronesia)
- Reefcrest parrotfish, Chlorurus frontalis (Valenciennes, 1840) (western Pacific to islands of Oceania)
- Redtail parrotfish, Chlorurus japanensis (Bloch, 1789) syn. Scarus pyrrhurus (western Pacific to Samoa)
- Steephead parrotfish, Chlorurus microrhinos (Bleeker, 1854) (western Pacific and islands of Oceania)
- Bullethead parrotfish, Chlorurus sordidus (Forsskal, 1775) (Indo-Pacific)
- Pacific longnose parrotfish, Hipposcarus longiceps (Valenciennes, 1840) (western Pacific to French Polynesia)
- Slender parrotfish, marbled parrotfish, Leptoscarus vaigiensis (Quoy & Gaimard, 1824) (scattered localities in the Indo-Pacific)
- Minifin parrotfish, Scarus altipinnis (Steindachner, 1879) syn. S. brevifilis (Great Barrier Reef and islands of Oceania)
- Chameleon parrotfish, Scarus chameleon Choat & Randall, 1986 (Western Australia to western Pacific and Fiji)
- Bridled parrotfish, Scarus frenatus (Lacepede, 1802) syn. S. sexvittatus (Indo-Pacific)
- Bluebarred parrotfish, Scarus ghobban Forsskal, 1775 (Indo-Pacific and tropical eastern Pacific)
- Globehead parrotfish, Scarus globiceps Valenciennes, 1840 (Indo-Pacific)
- Highfin parrotfish, Scarus longipinnis Randall & Choat, 1980 (southern subtropical Pacific from the Great Barrier Reef to Pitcairn Islands)
- Swarthy parrotfish, Scarus niger Forsskal, 1775 (Indo-Pacific)
- Egghead parrotfish, Scarus oviceps Valenciennes, 1840 (western Pacific and islands of Oceania)
- Whitespot parrotfish, palenose parrotfish, Scarus psittacus Forsskål, 1775 syn. Scarus forsteri (Bleeker, 1861) ((as S. forsteri) western Pacific to Micronesia and Pitcairn group) ((as S. psittacus) Indo-Pacific)
- Surf parrotfish, Scarus rivulatus Valenciennes, 1840 syn. S. fasciatus (western Pacific to the Caroline Islands and New Caledonia)
- Ember parrotfish, Scarus rubroviolaceus Bleeker, 1847 (Indo-Pacific and tropical eastern Pacific)
- Schlegel's parrotfish, Scarus schlegeli (Bleeker, 1861) (western Pacific and islands of Oceania)
- Greensnout parrotfish, Scarus spinus (Kner, 1868) (western Pacific to Micronesia and Samoa)

Family Opistognathidae - jawfishes, smilers

- Papuan jawfish, Opistognathus papuensis (Bleeker, 1868) (southern New Guinea and northern Queensland)
- Coral sea jawfish, Opistognathus sp. (known only from Lizard Island and Lihou Reef in the Coral Sea)

Family Uranoscopidae – stargazers

- Whitemargin stargazer, Uranoscopus sulphureus Valenciennes, 1831 syn. U. fuscomaculatus (Tonga, Fiji, Samoa, Indonesia and the Red Sea)

Family Trichonotidae - sand-divers

- Spotted sand-diver, Trichonotus setiger (Bloch & Schneider, 1801) (Persian Gulf to Queensland and Melanesia)
- Threadfin sand-diver, Trichonotus sp. (Coral sea, Marians & Marshall Islands)

Family Creediidae - sand burrowers

- Sand dart, Chalixodytes chameleontoculis Smith, 1957
- Barred sand burrower, Limnichthys fasciatus Waite, 1904 (western Pacific from Japan to Australia and the Kermadec Islands)
- Sand submarine, Limnichthys nitidus Smith, 1958 syn. Limnichthys donaldsoni (as L. donaldsoni)

Family Pinguipedidae – grubfishes, weevers, sandperches

- Latticed sandperch, Parapercis clathrata Ogilby, 1911 (western Pacific to Samoa and the islands of Micronesia)
- Sharpnose sandperch, Parapercis cylindrica (Bloch, 1797) (western Pacific to Fiji and the Marshall Islands)
- Speckled sandperch, Parapercis hexophtalma (Cuvier, 1829) syn. P. polyophtalma (East Africa and the Red Sea to the western Pacific and Fiji)
- Spotted sandperch, Parapercis millepunctata (Guenther, 1860) (Maldives to the islands of Oceania)
- Redbarred sandperch, Parapercis multiplicata Randall, 1984 (Ryukyu Islands, Indonesia, New Caledonia, Western Australia and the Coral Sea)
- Barred sandperch, Parapercis nebulosa (Quoy & Gaimard, 1825) (Western Australia to New South Wales)
- Redspotted sandperch, Parapercis schauinslandii (Steindachner, 1900) (Indo-Pacific)
- U-mark sandperch, Parapercis snyderi Jordan & Starcks, 1905 (western Pacific)
- Yellowbar sandperch, Parapercis xanthozona (Bleeker, 1849) (East Africa to western Pacific and Fiji)

Family Tripterygiidae – triplefins, threefins

- Highfin triplefin, Enneapterygius tutuilae Jordan & Seale, 1906 syn. E. altipinnis (Indo-Pacific)
- Saddled triplefin, Enneapterygius atrogulare (Guenther, 18??) syn. E. annulatus (Indo-Pacific)
- Tailbar triplefin, Enneapterygius sp. (Indo-Pacific)
- Neon triplefin, Helcogramma striatum Hansen, 1986 (Sri-lanka to western Pacific and Line Islands)
- Red-finned triplefin, Ucla xenogrammus Holleman, 1993 (Indo-Pacific)
- Bigmouth triplefin, Ucla sp. (Indo-Pacific)

Family Blenniidae – blennies

Tribe Nemophini - sabretooth blennies, fangblennies

- Lance blenny, Aspidontus dussumieri (Valenciennes, 1836) (Indo-Pacific)
- Mimic blenny, Aspidontus taeniatus Quoy & Gaimard, 1834 (Indo-Pacific)
- Yellowtail fangblenny, Meiacanthus atrodorsalis (Guenther, 1877) (Western Australia and western Pacific to Micronesia and Samoa)
- Doublepore fangblenny, Meiacanthus ditrema Smith-Vaniz, 1976 (Western Australia and western Pacific to Samoa and Tonga)
- Striped fangblenny, Meiacanthus grammistes (Valenciennes, 1836) (Western Australia and western Pacific to Caroline Islands and Santa Cruz Islands)
- Lined fangblenny, Meiacanthus lineatus (De Vis, 1884) (Great Barrier Reef)
- Yellow fangblenny, Meiacanthus luteus Smith-Vaniz, 1987 (Western Australia, 20°S to Queensland, 19°S)

Subfamily Blenniinae

- Black blenny, Enchelyurus ater (Guenther, 1877) (southern Oceania from the Coral Sea to the Tuamotu Archipelago, but not the Great Barrier Reef)
- Krauss's blenny, Enchelyurus kraussii (Klunzinger, 171) (Comores, Seychelles and Red Sea to the western Pacific and Mariana Islands)
- Oyster blenny, Omobranchus anolius (Valenciennes, 1836) (Spencer gulf, South Australia to the Queensland coast of the Gulf of Carpentaria)
- Hepburn's blenny, Parenchelyurus hepburni (Snyder, 1908) (western Pacific to Samoa and the Marshall Islands)
- Deceiver fangblenny, Petroscirtes fallax Smith-Vaniz, 1976 (Great Barrier Reef south of 17°S to New South Wales)
- Wolf fangblenny, brown sabretooth blenny, Petroscirtes lupus (De Vis, 1886) (Queensland, New South Wales, Lord Howe Island and New Caledonia) (Merimbula, New South Wales, to southern Queensland - also New Caledonia)
- Highfin fangblenny, Petroscirtes mitratus Rueppell, 1830 (East Africa and the Red Sea to Samoa, Tonga and the islands of Micronesia)
- Variable fangblenny, Petroscirtes variabilis Cantor, 1850 (Sri Lanka to the western Pacific)
- Smooth fangblenny, Petroscirtes xestus Jordan & Seale, 1906 (Indo-Pacific)
- Bicolour fangblenny, Plagiotremus laudandus (Whitley, 1961) (Western Australia and western Pacific to Samoa and the islands of Micronesia)
- Bluestriped fangblenny, blue-lined sabretooth blenny, Plagiotremus rhinorhynchos (Bleeker, 1852) (Indo-Pacific except Hawaii) (tropical Australia south to Walpole, Western Australia, and to Merimbula, New South Wales - also widespread in the Indo-West Pacific region)
- Piano fangblenny, hit and run blenny, yellow sabretooth blenny, Plagiotremus tapeinosoma (Bleeker, 1857) (tropical Australia south to Rottnest Island, Western Australia, and to Merimbula, New South Wales - also widespread in the Indo-West Pacific region) (Indo-Pacific except Hawaii)
- Hairtail blenny, Xiphasia setifer Swainson, 1839 (East Africa and the Red Sea to western Pacific including New Caledonia and Vanuatu)

Subfamily Salariinae

- Brown coral blenny, Atrosalarias fuscus (Rueppell, 1835) (Indo-Pacific)
- White-dotted blenny, Cirripectes alboapicalis (Ogilby, 1899) syn. C. patuki (southern subtropical Pacific from the southern Great Barrier Reef and Lord Howe Island to Easter Island)
- Chestnut blenny, Cirripectes castaneus (Valenciennes, 1836) syn. C. sebae (East Africa and the Red Sea to Tonga and the Caroline Islands)
- Lady Musgrave blenny, Cirripectes chelomatus Williams & Maugé, 1983 (Great Barrier Reef and Lord Howe Island to Tonga and Fiji)
- Filamentous blenny, Cirripectes filamentosus (Alleyne & Macleay, 1877) (western Indian Ocean including Persian Gulf and southern Red Sea to western Pacific)
- Barred blenny, Cirripectes polyzona (Bleeker, 1868) (East Africa to Samoa and the Line Islands)
- Zebra blenny, Cirripectes quagga (Fowler & Ball, 1924) (Indo-Pacific)
- Reticulated blenny, Cirripectes stigmaticus Strasburg & Schultz, 1953 (East Africa to Samoa and islands of Micronesia)
- Triplespot blenny, Crossosalarias macrospilus Smith-Vaniz & Springer, 1971 (western Pacific to Tonga)
- Fourline blenny, Ecsenius aequalis Springer, 1988 (Great Barrier Reef, Coral Sea, Trobriand Islands, Papua New Guinea)
- Australian blenny, Ecsenius australianus Springer, 1988 (northern Great Barrier Reef)
- Bicolour blenny, Ecsenius bicolor (Day, 1888) (Maldives to the islands of Micronesia and Samoa)
- Queensland blenny, Ecsenius mandibularis McCulloch, 1923 (Queensland from Cape Yorke Peninsula at 12°S to the Bunger group, southern Great Barrier Reef)
- Midas blenny, Ecsenius midas Starck, 1969 (Indo-Pacific)
- Great Barrier Reef blenny, Ecsenius stictus Springer, 1988 (Great Barrier Reef)
- Tiger blenny, Ecsenius tigris Springer, 1988 (Osprey, Bougainville & Holmes reefs in the western Coral Sea)
- Wavyline rockskipper, Entomacrodus decussatus (Bleeker, 1858) (Western Australia to western and central Pacific)
- Blackspotted rockskipper, Entomacrodus striatus (Quoy & Gaimard, 1836) syn. E. plurifilis (Indo-Pacific)
- Shortbodied blenny, Exallias brevis (Kner, 1868) ((Indo-Pacific)
- Goldspotted rockskipper, Blenniella chrysospilos (Bleeker, 1857) syn. Salarias coronatus (Indo-Pacific)
- Dussumier's rockskipper, Istiblennius dussumieri (Valenciennes, 1836) (East Africa to western Pacific)
- Rippled rockskipper, Istiblennius edentulus (Forster, 1801) (Indo-Pacific)
- Lined rockskipper, Istiblennius lineatus (Valenciennes, 1836) (Maldive to Pitcairn group)
- Peacock rockskipper, Istiblennius meleagris (Valenciennes, 1836) (Western Australia to Queensland)
- Bullethead rockskipper, Blenniella paula (Bryan & Herre, 1903) (Great Barrier Reef and the islands of Oceania except Hawaii and Easter Island)
- Throatspot blenny, Nannosalarias nativitatis (Regan, 1909) (Christmas Island (Indian Ocean) to western Pacific and Tonga)
- Barred-chin blenny, Rhabdoblennius nitidus (Günther, 1861) syn. Rhabdoblennius ellipes ((as R. ellipes) Great Barrier Reef and islands of Oceania)
- Jewelled blenny, Salarias fasciatus (Bloch, 1786) (East Africa and the Red Sea to Samoa and the islands of Micronesia)
- Fringelip blenny, Salarias sinuosus Snyder, 1908 (western Pacific)
- Talbot's blenny, Stanulus talboti Springer, 1968 (Great Barrier Reef, Lord Howe Island, Ryukyu Islands and Ogasawara Islands)

Family Callionymidae - dragonets

- Goram dragonet, Diplogrammus goramensis (Bleeker, 1858) (western Pacific from China to Fiji)
- Morrison's dragonet, Synchiropus morrisoni Schultz, 1960 (Japan to Australia and east to the Marshall Islands and Fiji)
- Ocellated dragonet, Synchiropus ocellatus (Pallas, 1770) (Japan to Australia and east to Pitcairn Island)
- Mandarinfish, Synchiropus splendidus (Herre, 1927) (western Pacific from the Ryukyu Islands to Australia)

Family Eleotridae - gudgeons, sleepers

- Tailface sleeper, Calumia godeffroyi (Guenther, 1877) (East Africa to the Society Islands)

Family Xenisthmidae - wrigglers

- Bullseye wriggler, Xenisthmus polyzonatus (Red Sea to Samoa and north to the Ryukyu Islands)

Family Gobiidae – gobies

- Spotted shrimp goby, Amblyeleotris guttata (Fowler, 1938) (East Indies to Samoa and north to the Ryukyu Islands)
- Blotchy shrimp goby, Amblyeleotris periophthalma (Bleeker, 1853) (western Pacific eastwards to Samoa)
- Steinitz's shrimp goby, Amblyeleotris steinitzi (Klausewitz, 1974) (Red Sea to Samoa)
- Wheeler's shrimp goby, Amblyeleotris wheeleri (Polunin & Lubbock, 1977) (East Africa to Australia and the Marshall Islands)
- Orange-striped goby, Amblygobius decussatus (Bleeker, 1855) (western Pacific)
- Banded goby, Amblygobius phalaena (Valenciennes, 1837) (Indo-Pacific)
- Old glory, Amblygobius rainfordi (Whitley, 1940) (Queensland and Coral Sea to Philippines)
- Sphynx goby, Amblygobius sphynx (Valenciennes, 1837) (East Africa to western Pacific)
- Starry goby, Asteropteryx semipunctata Rueppell, 1830 (East Africa and the Red Sea to Hawaiian Islands and Tuamotus)
- Common goby, Bathygobius fuscus (Rueppell, 1830) (East Africa and Red Sea to Tuamotus and Hawaiian Islands)
- Cocos goby, Bathygobius cocosensis (Bleeker, 1854) (East Africa to the Hawaiian Islands and Tuamotu Archipelago)
- Large whip goby, Bryaninops amplus Larson, 1985 (Madagascar and the Seychelles to the Hawaiian Islands)
- Erythrops goby, Bryaninops erythrops (Jordan & Seale, 1906) (Chagos Archipelago to Marhall Islands and Samoa)
- Redeye goby, Bryaninops natans Larson, 18985 (Red Sea to Micronesia and Cook Islands)
- Black coral goby, Bryaninops tigris Larson, 1985 (Chagos Archipelago to Hawaiian Islands)
- Whip goby, Bryaninops yongei (Davis & Cohen, 1968) (Australia to Hawaiian Islands and Rapa)
- Ostrich goby, Callogobius maculipinnis (Fowler, 1918) (East Africa and the Red Sea to Samoa and the Marshall Islands)
- Tripleband goby, Callogobius sclateri (Steindachner, 1880) (Indo-Pacific)
- Yellow shrimp goby, Cryptocentrus cinctus (Herre, 1936) (western Pacific)
- Y-bar shrimp goby, Cryptocentrus fasciatus (Playfair & Guenther, 1867) (East Africa to Melanesia and the Great Barrier Reef)
- Saddled shrimp goby, Cryptocentrus leucostictus (Guenther, 1871) (western Pacific)
- Target shrimp goby, Cryptocentrus strigilliceps (Jordan & Seale, 1906) (East Africa to the Marshall Islands and Samoa)
- Spotfin shrimp goby, Ctenogobiops pomastictus Lubbock & Polunin, 1977 (Queensland to Ryukyo Islands, east to Mariana Islands)
- Masted shrimp goby, Ctenogobiops tangaroai Lubbock & Polunin, 1977 (Australia to Samoa)
- Spikefin goby, Discordipinna griessingeri Hoese & Fourmanoir, 1978 (Red Sea to the Marquesas)
- Doublebar goby, Eviota bifasciata Lachner & Karnella, 1989 (Philippines and Indonesia to Northern Australia)
- Blackbelly goby, Eviota nigriventris Giltay, 1933 (Philippines to Melanesia and eastern Australia)
- Beautiful goby, Exyrias belissimus (Smith, 1959) (East Africa to Samoa)
- Puntang goby, Exyrias puntang Bleeker (Queensland)
- Novice goby, Fusigobius neophytus (Günther, 1877) syn. Coryphopterus neophytus ((as C. neophytus) East Africa to the Tuamotus)
- Blotched sand goby, Coryphopterus sp. (western Pacific)
- Shoulderspot goby, Gnatholepis cauerensis (Bleeker, 1853) syn. Gnatholepis scapulostigma Herre, 1953 ((as G. scapulostigma) eastern Indian Ocean and western Pacific)
- Fourbar goby, Gobiodon citrinus (Rueppell, 1838) (East Africa and the Red Sea to Samoa)
- Broad-barred goby, Gobiodon histrio (Valenciennes, 1837) (western Pacific)
- Small-eyed goby, Gobiodon micropus (Guenther, 1861) (Indo-Pacific)
- Okinawa goby, Gobiodon okinawae (Sawada, Arai & Abe, 1973) (western Pacific, Japan to Australia)
- Decorated goby, Istigobius decoratus (Herre, 1927) (East Africa and the Red Sea to Samoa)
- Orange-spotted goby, Istigobius rigilius (Herre, 1953) (Molucca and Philippine Islands to Australia and east to Fiji and the Marshall Islands)
- Whitecap goby, Lotilia graciliosa Klausewitz, 1960 (Red Sea to southern Japan, Marshall Islands and Fiji)
- Wilbur's goby, Macrodontogobius wilburi Herre, 1926 (Seychelles to New Caledonia and Line Islands)
- Spinecheek goby, Oplopomus oplopomus (Valenciennes, 1837) (East Africa to Society Islands)
- Redhead goby, Paragobiodon echinocephalus Rueppell, 1828 (East Africa and the Red Sea to the Tuamotus and Marshall Islands)
- Yellowskin goby, Paragobiodon xanthosoma (Bleeker, 1852) (Chagos Archipelago to Samoa)
- Silverlined mudskipper, Periophthalmus argentilineatus (Valenciennes, 1837) (southern Red Sea south to Natal and east to the Marianas and Samoa)
- Coral goby, Pleurosicya micheli Fourmanoir, 1971 (Indo-Pacific)
- Girdled goby, Priolepis cincta (Regan, 1908) syn. P. naraharae (East Africa to southeastern Polynesia)
- Trinspot goby, Signigobius biocellatus Hoese & Allen, 1977 (Philippines, Indonesia and Palau Islands to Melanesia and the Great Barrier Reef)
- Yellownose shrimp goby, Stonogobiops xanthorhinica Hoese & Randall, 1982 (western edge of Pacific from Japan to the Great Barrier Reef)
- Orange-red goby, Trimma okinawae (Aoyagi, 1949) (western Pacific)
- Stripehead goby, Trimma striatum (Herre, 1945) (Philippines to Australia)
- Orange-spotted goby, Trimma sp.1 (in Randall, 1997) (DFH-9 - Hoese) (western Pacific)
- Benjamin's goby, Trimma benjamini Winterbottom, 1996 (western Pacific)
- Twostripe goby, Valenciennea helsdingenii (Bleeker, 1858) (East Africa to the western Pacific)
- Long finned goby, Valenciennea longipinnis (Lay & Bennett, 1839) (eastern Indian Ocean and western Pacific)
- Striped goby, Valenciennea muralis (Valenciennes, 1837) (Indonesia to Melanesia and Northern Australia)
- Orange-dashed goby, Valenciennea puellaris (Tomiyama, 1956) (Red Sea to Samoa and the Marshall Islands)
- Sixspot goby, Valenciennea sexguttata (Valenciennes, 1837) (East Africa to Samoa and the Marshall Islands)
- Blueband goby, Valenciennea strigata (Broussonet, 1782) (East Africa to Society Islands and Line Islands)
- Parva goby, Valenciennea parva Hoese & Larson, 1994 (western Pacific)
- Elegant goby, Valenciennea decora Hoese & Larson, 1994 (Great Barrier Reef to New Caledonia)
- Ambanoro goby, Vanderhorstia ambanoro (Fourmanoir, 1957) (East Africa to Samoa)
- Ocellated goby, Vanderhorstia ornatissima Smith, 1959 (East Africa to Samoa)
- Shadow goby, Acentrogobius nebulosus (Forsskål, 1775) syn. Yongeichthys nebulosus ((as Y. nebulosus) East Africa to western Pacific)

Family Microdesmidae - wormfishes, dartfishes

- Curious wormfish, Gunnellichthys curiosus Dawson, 1968 (Seychelles, Maldives, Indonesia, Coral Sea, Society Islands and Hawaii)
- Onespot wormfish, Gunnellichthys monostigma Smith, 1958 syn. Gunnellichthys monostigmata Smith, 1958 ((as G. monostigmata) Indo-Pacific)
- Brownstripe wormfish, Gunnellichthys pleurotaenia Bleeker, 1858 (western Pacific east to Samoa and the Mariana Islands)
- Yellowstripe wormfish, Gunnellichthys viridescens (Seychelles, Maldives, Marshall Islands and Great Barrier Reef)
- Elegant firefish, Nemateleotris decora Randall & Allen, 1973 (Islands of the western Indian Ocean to the western Pacific)
- Fire dartfish, Nemateleotris magnifica Fowler, 1938 (Indo-Pacific)
- Twotone dartfish, Ptereleotris evides (Jordan & Hubbs, 1925) syn. P. tricolor (Indo-Pacific)
- Lined dartfish, Ptereleotris grammica Randall & Lubbock, 1982 (western Pacific)
- Threadfin dartfish, Ptereleotris hanae (Jordan & Snyder, 1901) (Western Australia to western Pacific and east to Samoa and the Line Islands)
- Spottail dartfish, Ptereleotris heteroptera Bleeker, 1855 (Indo-Pacific)
- Pale dartfish, Ptereleotris microlepis (Bleeker, 1856) (Indo-Pacific)
- Monofin dartfish, Ptereleotris monoptera Randall & Hoese, 1985 (Indo-Pacific from scattered localities)
- Bandtail dartfish, Ptereleotris uroditaenia Randall & Hoese, 1985 (Indonesia, Solomon Islands and Great Barrier Reef)
- Zebra dartfish, Ptereleotris zebra Fowler, 1938 (Indo-Pacific)

Family Acanthuridae - surgeonfishes

Subfamily Acanthurinae

- Whitefin surgeonfish, Acanthurus albipectoralis Allen & Ayling, 1987 (Great Barrier Reef and of the Coral Sea to Tonga)
- Orange-socket surgeonfish, Acanthurus auranticavus Randall, 1956 (Maldives, Philippines, Indonesia and the Great Barrier Reef)
- Roundspot surgeonfish, Acanthurus bariene Lesson, 1830 syn. A. nummifer (Maldives to the western Pacific)
- Ringtail surgeonfish, Acanthurus blochii Valenciennes, 1835 (Indo-Pacific)
- Eyestripe surgeonfish, Acanthurus dussumieri Valenciennes, 1835 (East Africa to the Line Islands and Hawaii)
- Finelined surgeonfish, Acanthurus grammoptilus Richardson, 1843 (Philippines to Australia including the Great Barrier Reef)
- Whitespotted surgeonfish, Acanthurus guttatus Forster, 1801 (Islands of the western Indian Ocean to Oceania)
- Striped surgeonfish, Acanthurus lineatus (Linnaeus, 1758) (Indo-Pacific except Red Sea)
- Elongate surgeonfish, Acanthurus mata (Cuvier, 1829) (Indo-Pacific)
- Whitecheek surgeonfish, Acanthurus nigricans (Linnaeus, 1758) syn. A. glaucopareius (Islands of the tropical Pacific including eastern Pacific)
- Blackstreak surgeonfish, Acanthurus nigricauda Duncker & Mohr, 1929 (Indo-Pacific)
- Brown surgeonfish, Acanthurus nigrofuscus (Forsskal, 1775) (Indo-Pacific)
- Bluelined surgeonfish, Acanthurus nigroris Valenciennes, 1835 (islands of Oceania)
- Orangeband surgeonfish, Acanthurus olivaceus Forster, 1801 (western Pacific and islands of Oceania)
- Mimic surgeonfish, Acanthurus pyroferus Kittlitz, 1834 (western Pacific to islands of Oceania)
- Thompson's surgeonfish, Acanthurus thompsoni (Fowler, 1923) syn. A. philppinus (Indo-Pacific)
- Convict surgeonfish, Acanthurus triostegus (Linnaeus, 1758) (Indo-Pacific and tropical eastern Pacific)
- Yellowfin surgeonfish, Acanthurus xanthopterus (Valenciennes, 1835) (Indo-Pacific and tropical eastern Pacific)
- Twospot bristletooth, Ctenochaetus binotatus Randall, 1955 (Indo-Pacific)
- Lined bristletooth, Ctenochaetus striatus (Quoy & Gaimard, 1825) (Indo-Pacific)
- Goldring bristletooth, Ctenochaetus strigosus (Bennett, 1828) (Indo-Pacific)
- Palette surgeonfish, Paracanthurus hepatus (Linnaeus, 1766) (East Africa to Samoa, Kiribati and Mariana Islands)
- Brushtail tang, Zebrasoma scopas (Cuvier, 1829) (Indo-Pacific)
- Sailfin tang, Zebrasoma veliferum (Bloch, 1797) (western Pacific and islands of Oceania)

Subfamily Nasinae

- Whitemargin unicornfish, Naso annulatus (Quoy & Gaimard, 1825) syn. N. herrei (Indo-Pacific)
- Humpback unicornfish, Naso brachycentron (Valenciennes, 1835) (Indo-Pacific)
- Spotted unicornfish, Naso brevirostris (Valenciennes, 1835) (Indo-Pacific)
- Sleek unicornfish, Naso hexacanthus (Bleeker, 1855) (Indo-Pacific)
- Orangespine unicornfish, Naso lituratus (Forster, 1801) (Indo-Pacific)
- Elongate unicornfish, Naso lopezi Herre, 1927 (western Pacific)
- Grey unicornfish, Naso caesius Randall & Bell, 1992 (antiequatorial in Oceania including New Caledonia and the southern Coral Sea)

Family Zanclidae - Moorish idol

Family Siganidae – rabbitfishes, spinefeet

Family Istiophoridae - billfishes

Family Scombridae – mackerels, tunas

- Southern bluefin tuna, Thunnus maccoyi Castelnau, 1872 (Western Australia to southern Queensland and around Tasmania - also widespread in the Southern Hemisphere)

=== Order Mugiliformes ===
Family Mugilidae – mullets

- Fringelip mullet, Crenimugil crenilabis (Forsskal, 1775) (East Africa to Line and Tuamotu Islands)
- Diamond-scale mullet, Liza vaigiensis (Quoy & Gaimard, 1825) syn. Ellochelon vaigensis ((as E. vaigensis) East Africa and the Red Sea to the Tuamotus)

=== Order Pleuronectiformes ===
Family Bothidae - lefteye flounders

Family Pleuronectidae – righteye flounders

=== Order Tetraodontiformes ===
Family Balistidae

Family Monacanthidae – leatherjackets, filefishes

- Fanbelly leatherjacket, Monacanthus chinensis (Osbeck, 1765) (tropical Australia south to Geographe Bay, Western Australia, and to Western Port, Victoria - also widespread in the Indo-West Pacific region)

Family Ostraciidae – boxfishes, cowfishes, trunkfishes

- Humpback turretfish, Tetrosomus gibbosus (Linnaeus, 1758) (tropical Australia south to Albany, Western Australia, and to Cape Conran, Victoria - also widespread in the Indo-West Pacific region)

Family Tetraodontidae – toadfishes, pufferfishes

Family Diodontidae – porcupine fishes

=== Unallocated species ===
(Perciformes) Family Chironemidae

- Silver spot, Chironemus maculosus (Richardson, 1850) syn. Threpterius maculosus
