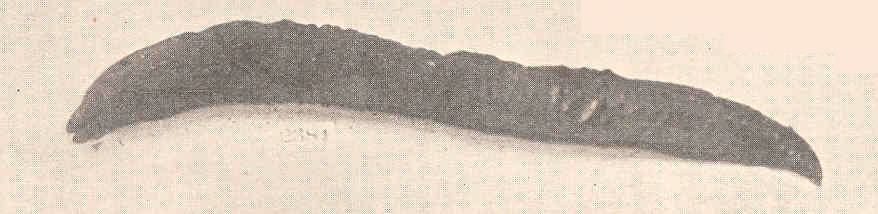

Conservation status
- Least Concern (IUCN 3.1)

Scientific classification
- Kingdom: Animalia
- Phylum: Chordata
- Class: Actinopterygii
- Order: Anguilliformes
- Family: Muraenidae
- Genus: Gymnothorax
- Species: G. buroensis

Binomial name
- Gymnothorax buroensis (Bleeker, 1857)

= Latticetail moray =

Species of fish

The latticetail moray (Gymnothorax buroensis) is a moray eel found in coral reefs in the Pacific and Indian Oceans. It was first named by Pieter Bleeker in 1857, and is commonly also known as the vagrant moray, Buru moray eel, or Buro moray.
