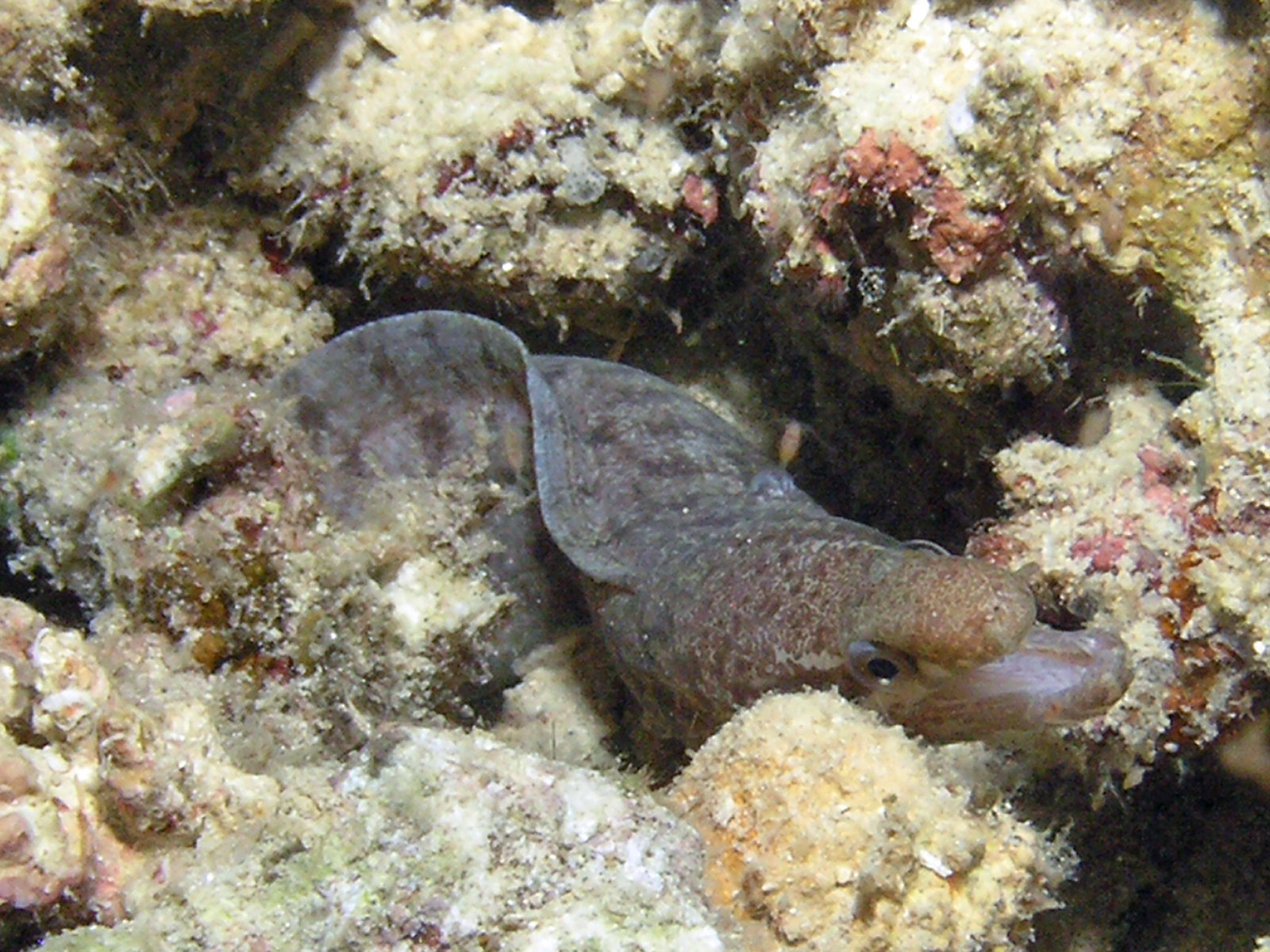
- At Bunaken, North Sulawesi

Conservation status
- Least Concern (IUCN 3.1)

Scientific classification
- Kingdom: Animalia
- Phylum: Chordata
- Class: Actinopterygii
- Order: Anguilliformes
- Family: Muraenidae
- Genus: Gymnothorax
- Species: G. zonipectis

Binomial name
- Gymnothorax zonipectis Seale, 1906

= Barred-fin moray =

Species of fish

The barred-fin moray or bar-tail moray (Gymnothorax zonipectis) is a species of marine fish in the family Muraenidae, found in warm, shallow waters of the Indian and Pacific oceans.

== Description ==
The barred-fin moray is a medium-sized fish that can reach a maximum length of 50 cm, but the ones usually observed are about 30 cm. It is serpentine in shape, its body has a light brown color and it is covered with a mix of darker spots and broken and irregular dark brown lines. A relatively large whitish spot is located below the back corner of the eye.

== Distribution & habitat ==
The barred-fin moray is widespread throughout the Indo-Pacific area from the eastern coast of Africa to Polynesia and Hawaii, and also from Taiwan and southern Japan to New Caledonia.

This moray eel likes shallow and detrital waters from lagoons and external reef slopes up to 132 feet (40 meters).

== Biology ==
The barred-fin moray is a carnivore, solitary, secretive and benthic animal. During daytime, it sits in a shelter where it lives often invisible and at night, it goes out to actively hunt prey, consisting of small fishes.
