= Springer's blenny =

Springer's blenny may refer to the following fish species:

- Cirripectes springeri
- Scartella springeri
- Starksia springeri
