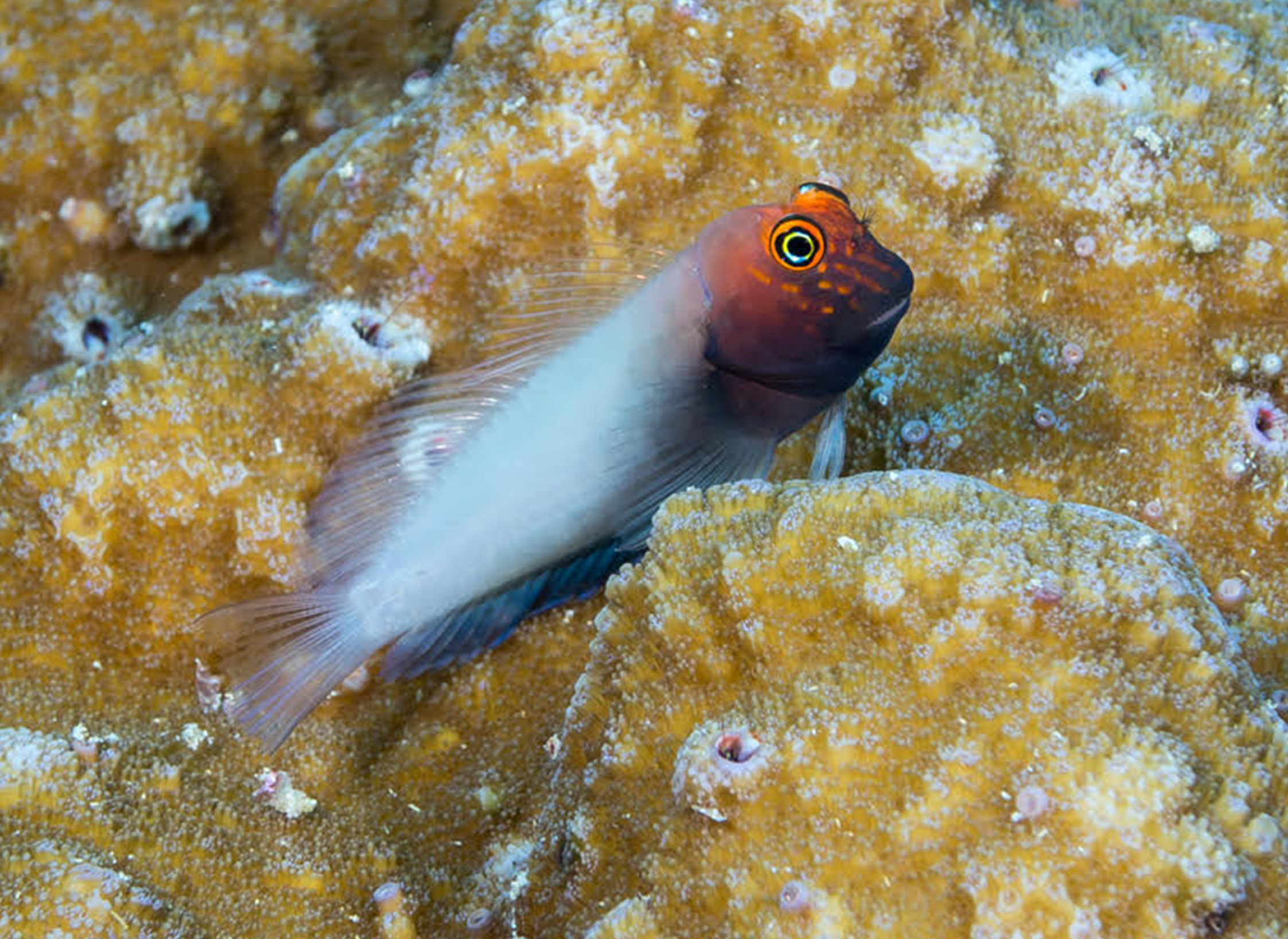

Scientific classification
- Kingdom: Animalia
- Phylum: Chordata
- Class: Actinopterygii
- Order: Blenniiformes
- Family: Blenniidae
- Genus: Cirripectes
- Species: C. matatakaro

Binomial name
- Cirripectes matatakaro Hoban & Williams, 2020

= Cirripectes matatakaro =

Species of fish

Cirripectes matatakaro, the Suspiria blenny, is a species of combtooth blenny that occurs on coral reefs in the central/southern tropical Pacific. In the northern hemisphere, it is known from the Northern Line Islands (Palmyra, Kiritimati, and Tabuaeran) and in the southern hemisphere it occurs at the Marquesas, Tuamotu, Pitcairn, Gambier, and Austral islands. This species reaches a length of 6.5 centimetres (2.6 in) SL.

The species was described in 2020 by Mykle L. Hoban and Jeffrey T. Williams from specimens previously identified as Cirripectes variolosus. The specific epithet is Gilbertese for "eye that sparks" and was chosen to honor the place and people where the species was initially encountered by the first author. The common name refers to Dario Argento's 1977 film.
