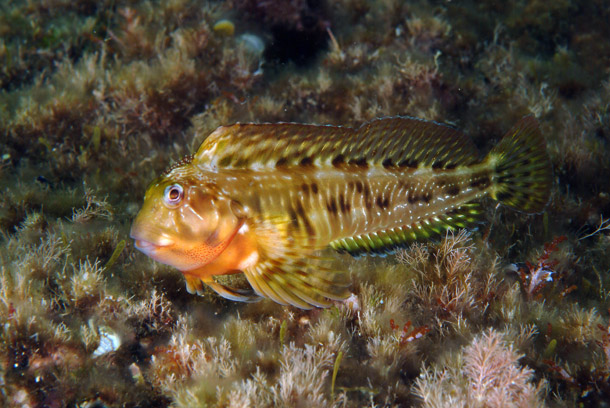

Conservation status
- Least Concern (IUCN 3.1)

Scientific classification
- Kingdom: Animalia
- Phylum: Chordata
- Class: Actinopterygii
- Division: Teleostei
- Order: Blenniiformes
- Family: Blenniidae
- Genus: Scartella
- Species: S. cristata

Binomial name
- Scartella cristata (Linnaeus, 1758)

Synonyms
- List: Blennius cristatus Linnaeus, 1758; Adonis cristatus (Linnaeus, 1758); Scartella cristatus (Linnaeus, 1758); Blennius pinaru Lacépède, 1800; Blennius crinitus Valenciennes, 1836; Blennius microstomus Poey, 1860; Scartella microstoma (Poey, 1860); Blennius asterias Goode & T.H. Bean, 1882; Blennius arboreus Bath, 1966

= Scartella cristata =

Species of fish

Scartella cristata, also known by the vernacular names molly miller or molly miller blenny, is a species of marine ray-finned fish belonging to the family Blenniidae, the combtooth blennies. This species is found in the Atlantic, Mediterranean, and northwest Pacific Oceans. Its colour is a mottled tan, white, and black covering the body and fins. The head of this fish is covered with short hair-like appendages and has two very large eyes. This species reaches 12 cm (4.7 in) in total length.

== Reproduction ==
This blenny is oviparous; its eggs are demersal and adhesive.

== Habitat ==
The molly miller is a marine tropical fish that lives in rocks or coral reefs 0–10 m below the surface. Coral reefs are perfect places for the fish to hunt and feed on the small crustaceans and algae that make up its omnivorous diet, and give them shelter and places to hide, as well.

== Taxonomy and phylogeny ==
The molly miller was first formally described as Blennius cristatus by Linnaeus in the 10th edition of Systema Naturae with its type locality given as Ascension Island.

A 2020 study which analysed the mitochondrial data of the genus Scartella for the first time showed that Scartella cristata is a lineage consisting of 5 clades: 2 in Caribbean waters, 1 in the East Atlantic/Mediterranean, and 2 in Brazil. The Brazilian clades are sympatric from Rio de Janeiro to Rio Grande do Sul states (southern Brazil), with one clade being unique to Brazil and the other closely related to the eastern Atlantic lineage.

== Distribution ==
It lives in the western Atlantic from Bermuda, Florida, and northern Gulf of Mexico to Brazil, and in the eastern Atlantic from Mauritania and the Canary Islands to Namibia. The fish can be found in the southern Mediterranean, including near Milan, Sicily, and the Peloponnese (Greece). Records from the western Pacific are regarded as doubtful and may refer to the maned blenny (Scartella emarginata).

== Bibliography ==
- Balma, G. A. C. & G. B. Delmastro (1984). Scartella cristata (Linnaeus, 1758), blennide nuovo per la fauna del Mar Ligure (Osteichthyes, Blenniidae). Doriana 6:1-5.
- Bath, H. (1990) Über eine neue Art der Gattung Scartella von den Kapverdischen Inseln (Pisces: Blenniidae). Mitteilungen Pollichia v. 77: 395–407.
- Brum, M. J. I., C. Oliveira, M. M. Correa & P. M. Galetti (1994). Estudos citogenéticos em Scartella cristata (Pisces, Perciformes, Blenniidae) do litoral do estado do Rio de Janeiro. p. 24. A. V. Simp. Citogenet. Evol. e Aplic. de Peixes Neotropicais, Botucatu - SP.
- Eschmeyer, William N. (1990) Genera of Recent Fishes. California Academy of Sciences. San Francisco, California. iii + 697. ISBN 0-940228-23-8.
- Eschmeyer, William N., ed. (1998). Catalog of Fishes. Special Publication of the Center for Biodiversity Research and Information, núm. 1, vol. 1–3. California Academy of Sciences. San Francisco, California. ISBN 0-940228-47-5.
- Hardy, J. D. Jr. (2003). Coral reef fish species. NOAA\National Oceanographic Data Center. NODC Coral Reef Data and Information Management System. Estats Units. 537 p.
- Helfman, G., B. Collette & D. Facey (1997). The diversity of fishes. Blackwell Science, Malden, Massachusetts.
- Moyle, P. i J. Cech. (2000). Fishes: An Introduction to Ichthyology, 4a. edició, Upper Saddle River, Nova Jersey: Prentice-Hall.
- Nelson, J.S., E.J. Crossman, H. Espinosa-Pérez, L.T. Findley, C.R. Gilbert, R.N. Lea i J.D. Williams, 2004. Common and scientific names of fishes from the United States, Canada, and Mexico. American Fisheries Society, Special Publication 29, Bethesda, Maryland.
- Nelson, Joseph S.: Fishes of the World, John Wiley & Sons. ISBN 0-471-25031-7. 2006.
- Nieder, J. (1988). Zum Vorkommen von Scartella cristata (L.) und Parablennius pilicornis (Cuv.) (Teleostei, Blenniidae) an der nordspanischen Mittelmeerküste. Zool. Anz. 220(3/4):144-150.
- Nieder, J. (1996). Agonistic behavioural patterns in the blenniid fish Scartella cristata (Teleostei, Blenniidae) and the role of its unusual erectile nuchal crest. Z. Fischkd. 3(2):235-241.
- Nieder, J. (1997). Seasonal variation in feeding patterns and food niche overlap in the Mediterranean blennies Scartella cristata, Parablennius pilicornis and Lipophrys trigloides (Pisces: Blenniidae). Mar. Ecol. 18(3):227-237.
- Nieder, J., G. La Mesa & M. Vacchi (2000). Blennidae along the Italian coasts of the Ligurian and the Tyrrhenian Sea: community structure and new records of Scartella cristata for northern Italy. Cybium 24(4):359-369.
- Osório, B. (1898). Da distribuição geográfica dos peixes e crustáceos colhidos nas possessões portuguesas da África Occidental e existentes no Museu Nacional de Lisbon. J. Sci. Math. Phys. Nat. 5(19):185-207.
- Rangel, C. A. & L. F. Mendes (2009). Review of blenniid fishes from Fernando de Noronha Archipelago, Brazil, with description of a new species of Scartella (Teleostei: Blenniidae). Zootaxa Núm. 2006: 51–61.
- Springer, V. G. (1986). Blenniidae. p. 742–755. A. M. M. Smith & P. C. Heemstra (eds.) Smiths' sea fishes. Springer-Verlag, Berlin.
- Springer, V. (1994). Blennies. Planes 214–217 a W. N. Eschmeyer, J. R. Paxton, editors. Encyclopedia of Fishes – 2nd edition, San Diego, California: Academic Press.
- Vitturi, R., P. Carbone, E. Catalano & M. Macaluso (1986). Karyotypes of five species of Blennioidea (Pisces, Perciformes) Caryologia 39(3–4):273-279.
- Wheeler, A. (1985). The World Encyclopedia of Fishes, 2nd edition, London: Macdonald.
