= Cirripectes imitator =

Conservation status
- Least Concern (IUCN 3.1)

Scientific classification
- Kingdom: Animalia
- Phylum: Chordata
- Class: Actinopterygii
- Order: Blenniiformes
- Family: Blenniidae
- Genus: Cirripectes
- Species: C. imitator

Binomial name
- Cirripectes imitator J. T. Williams, 1985

Species of fish

Cirripectes imitator, the imitator blenny, is a species of combtooth blenny found in coral reefs in the western Pacific ocean. This species reaches a length of 12 centimetres (4.7 in) TL.
