= Cirripectes hutchinsi =

Conservation status
- Least Concern (IUCN 3.1)

Scientific classification
- Kingdom: Animalia
- Phylum: Chordata
- Class: Actinopterygii
- Division: Teleostei
- Order: Blenniiformes
- Family: Blenniidae
- Genus: Cirripectes
- Species: C. hutchinsi

Binomial name
- Cirripectes hutchinsi J. T. Williams, 1988

Species of fish

Cirripectes hutchinsi is a species of combtooth blenny found in coral reefs in the eastern Indian Ocean, around western Australia. This species reaches a length of 10.6 centimetres (4.2 in) SL. The specific name honours the curator of fish at the Western Australian Museum in Perth, Barry Hutchins.
