= Cirripectes alleni =

Conservation status
- Least Concern (IUCN 3.1)

Scientific classification
- Kingdom: Animalia
- Phylum: Chordata
- Class: Actinopterygii
- Order: Blenniiformes
- Family: Blenniidae
- Genus: Cirripectes
- Species: C. alleni

Binomial name
- Cirripectes alleni J. T. Williams, 1993

Species of fish

Cirripectes alleni, commonly known as the Kimberley blenny, is a species of combtooth blenny found in coral reefs in the eastern Indian Ocean, around Australia. These species reaches a length of 6.5 centimetres (2.6 in) TL. The specific name honours the ichthyologist Gerald R. Allen.
