= Cirripectes heemstraorum =

Conservation status
- Least Concern (IUCN 3.1)

Scientific classification
- Kingdom: Animalia
- Phylum: Chordata
- Class: Actinopterygii
- Order: Blenniiformes
- Family: Blenniidae
- Genus: Cirripectes
- Species: C. heemstraorum

Binomial name
- Cirripectes heemstraorum J. T. Williams, 2010

Species of fish

Cirripectes heemstraorum, the yellowtail blenny, is a species of combtooth blenny from the family Blenniidae. It is found in the Indian Ocean where it is known from three South African specimens and an Indonesian specimen. It is distinguished from its congeners by the nape having an extensive black flap on both sides of its neck; 10-13 cirri which are found between the neck flaps; an entire dorsal fin; 5-6 cirri above the eye, 6-8 cirri on the nose; the males have small dark spots on their body towards the tail which merge to form short black stripes on caudal peduncle, in life the females have a brilliant yellow caudal fin while in the males only the outer half of the tail is bright yellow.

The specific name honours the South African ichthyologists Phil Heemstra and Elaine Heemstra both of the South African Institute for Aquatic Biodiversity. They collected all the known South African specimens of this species and took a photograph of a specimen which showed its life colours. The type were collected near Cape Vidal in KwaZulu Natal from a newly created artificial reef and the parental source of the colonisers on this reef is unknown. It is thought that the natural habitat of this blenny is in the vicinity of shores or reefs which are swept by high energy waves and are prone to fast currents.
