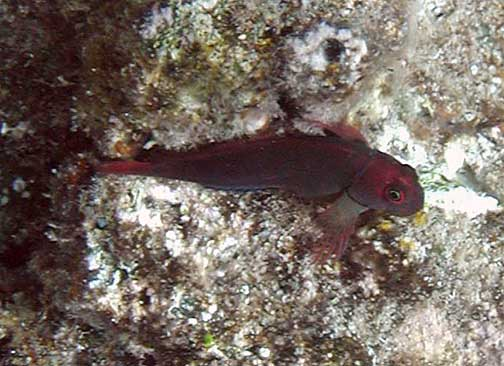
- Cirripectes vanderbilti

Scientific classification
- Kingdom: Animalia
- Phylum: Chordata
- Class: Actinopterygii
- Order: Blenniiformes
- Family: Blenniidae
- Subfamily: Salariinae
- Genus: Cirripectes; Swainson, 1839

Type species
- Salarias variolosus Valenciennes, 1836

= Cirripectes =

Genus of fishes

Cirripectes is a large genus of combtooth blennies found throughout the Pacific and Indian oceans. Cirripectes biconvexus, an otolith based fossil species from the Burdigalian (Miocene) of southwestern India (Quilon Formation) is probably the earliest record of this genus.

== Species ==
There are currently 24 recognized species in this genus:

- Cirripectes alboapicalis (J. D. Ogilby, 1899) (Blackblotch blenny)
- Cirripectes alleni J. T. Williams, 1993 (Kimberley blenny)
- Cirripectes auritus Carlson, 1981 (Blackflap blenny)
- Cirripectes castaneus (Valenciennes, 1836) (Chestnut eyelash-blenny)
- Cirripectes chelomatus J. T. Williams & Maugé, 1984 (Lady Musgrave blenny)
- Cirripectes filamentosus (Alleyne & W. J. Macleay, 1877) (Filamentous blenny)
- Cirripectes fuscoguttatus Strasburg & L. P. Schultz, 1953 (Spotted blenny)
- Cirripectes gilberti J. T. Williams, 1988
- Cirripectes heemstraorum J. T. Williams, 2010 (Yellowtail blenny)
- Cirripectes hutchinsi J. T. Williams, 1988
- Cirripectes imitator J. T. Williams, 1985 (Imitator blenny)
- Cirripectes jenningsi L. P. Schultz, 1943
- Cirripectes kuwamurai Fukao, 1984
- Cirripectes matatakaro M. L. Hoban & Williams, 2020 (Suspiria blenny)
- Cirripectes obscurus (Borodin, 1927) (Gargantuan blenny)
- Cirripectes perustus J. L. B. Smith, 1959 (Flaming blenny)
- Cirripectes polyzona (Bleeker, 1868)
- Cirripectes quagga (Fowler & Ball, 1924) (Squiggly blenny)
- Cirripectes randalli J. T. Williams, 1988
- Cirripectes springeri J. T. Williams, 1988 (Springer's blenny)
- Cirripectes stigmaticus Strasburg & L. P. Schultz, 1953 (Red-streaked blenny)
- Cirripectes vanderbilti (Fowler, 1938) (Scarface blenny)
- Cirripectes variolosus (Valenciennes, 1836) (Red-speckled blenny)
- Cirripectes viriosus J. T. Williams, 1988
- Cirripectes biconvexus Carolin, Bajpai, Maurya & Schwarzhans, 2022 (otolith based fossil species)
