= Cirripectes viriosus =

Conservation status
- Least Concern (IUCN 3.1)

Scientific classification
- Kingdom: Animalia
- Phylum: Chordata
- Class: Actinopterygii
- Order: Blenniiformes
- Family: Blenniidae
- Genus: Cirripectes
- Species: C. viriosus

Binomial name
- Cirripectes viriosus J. T. Williams, 1988

Species of fish

Cirripectes viriosus, the robust blenny, is a species of combtooth blenny found in the western central Pacific ocean, around the Batan Islands and the Philippines. This species reaches a length of 11.5 centimetres (4.5 in) SL.
