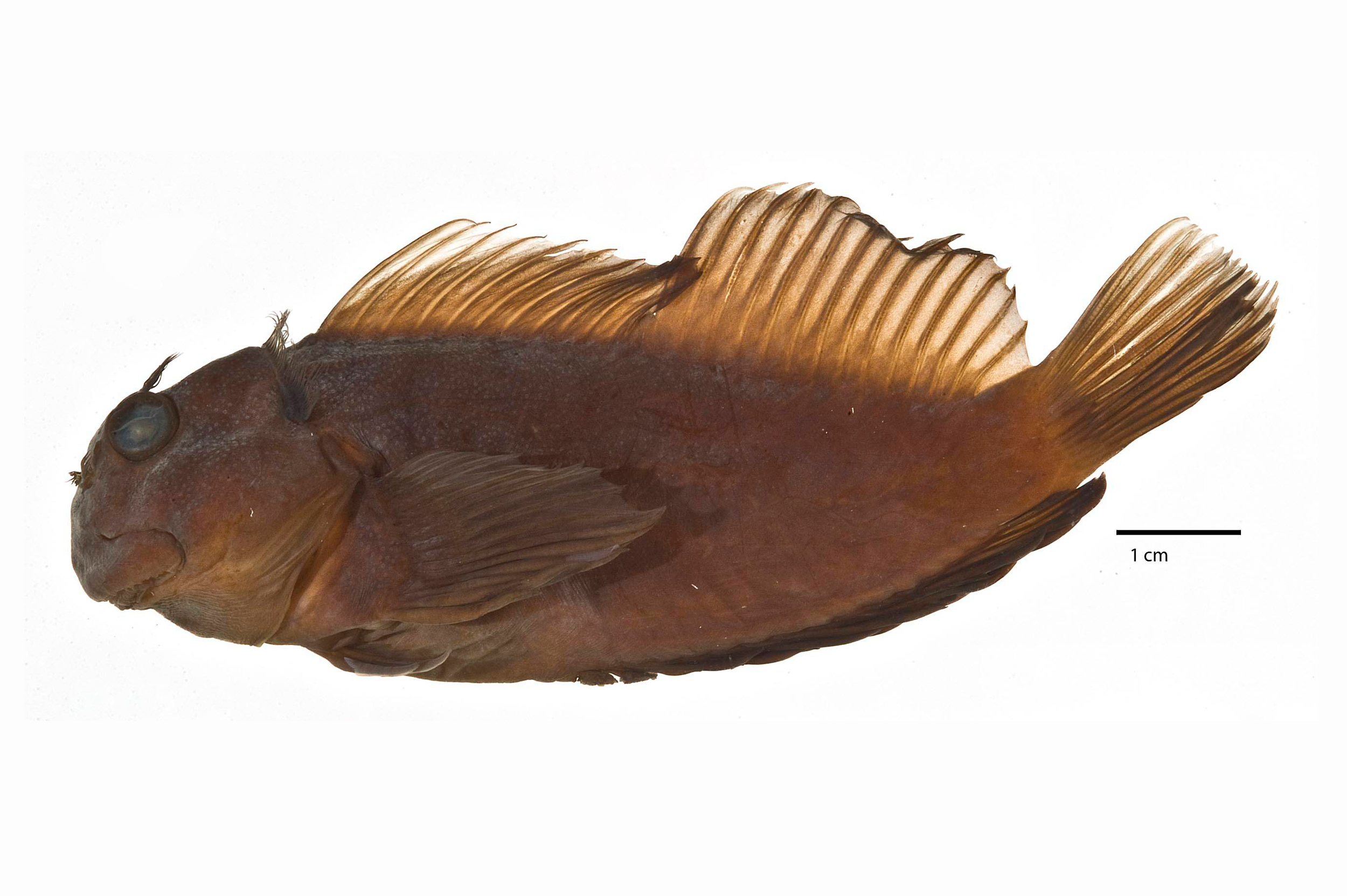
- Holotype

Conservation status
- Least Concern (IUCN 3.1)

Scientific classification
- Kingdom: Animalia
- Phylum: Chordata
- Class: Actinopterygii
- Order: Blenniiformes
- Family: Blenniidae
- Genus: Cirripectes
- Species: C. gilberti

Binomial name
- Cirripectes gilberti J. T. Williams, 1988

= Cirripectes gilberti =

Species of fish

Cirripectes gilberti is a species of combtooth blenny found in coral reefs in the Indian Ocean. This species reaches a length of 9.3 centimetres (3.7 in) SL.

== Etymology ==
The specific name honours the American ichthyologist Carter R. Gilbert of the Florida Museum of Natural History.
