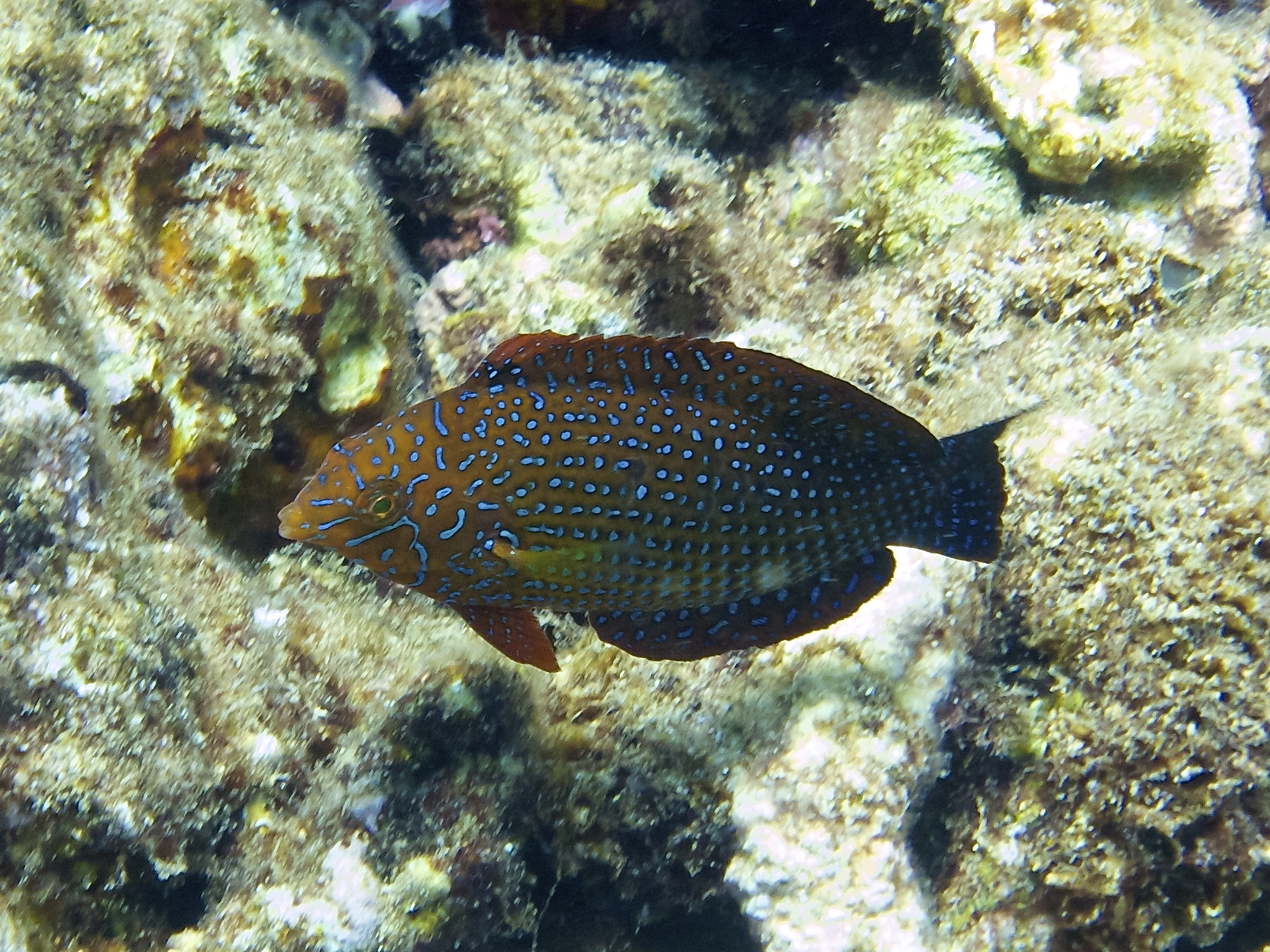
- M. geoffroy

Scientific classification
- Kingdom: Animalia
- Phylum: Chordata
- Class: Actinopterygii
- Order: Labriformes
- Family: Labridae
- Subfamily: Julidinae
- Genus: Macropharyngodon; Bleeker, 1862

Type species
- Julis geoffroy Quoy & Gaimard, 1824

= Macropharyngodon =

Genus of fishes

Macropharyngodon is a genus of wrasses native to the Indian and Pacific Oceans.

== Species ==
The 12 currently recognized species in this genus are:

Species	Common name	Image
Macropharyngodon bipartitus J. L. B. Smith, 1957	Rare wrasse	
Macropharyngodon choati J. E. Randall, 1978	Choat's wrasse	
Macropharyngodon cyanoguttatus J. E. Randall, 1978, 1978		
Macropharyngodon geoffroy Quoy & Gaimard, 1824	Geoffroy's wrasse	
Macropharyngodon kuiteri J. E. Randall, 1978	Black leopard wrasse	
Macropharyngodon marisrubri J. E. Randall, 1978		
Macropharyngodon meleagris Valenciennes, 1839	Blackspotted wrasse	
Macropharyngodon moyeri Shepard & K. A. Meyer, 1978		
Macropharyngodon negrosensis Herre, 1932	Yellow-spotted wrasse	
Macropharyngodon ornatus J. E. Randall, 1978	False leopard	
Macropharyngodon pakoko Delrieu-Trottin, J. T. Williams & Planes, 2014	Pakoko wrasse	
Macropharyngodon vivienae J. E. Randall, 1978	Madagascar wrasse	
