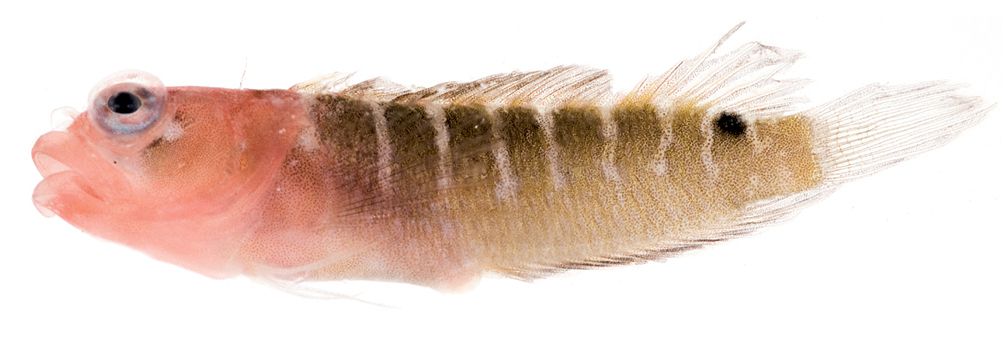
- Male (length 16 mm)
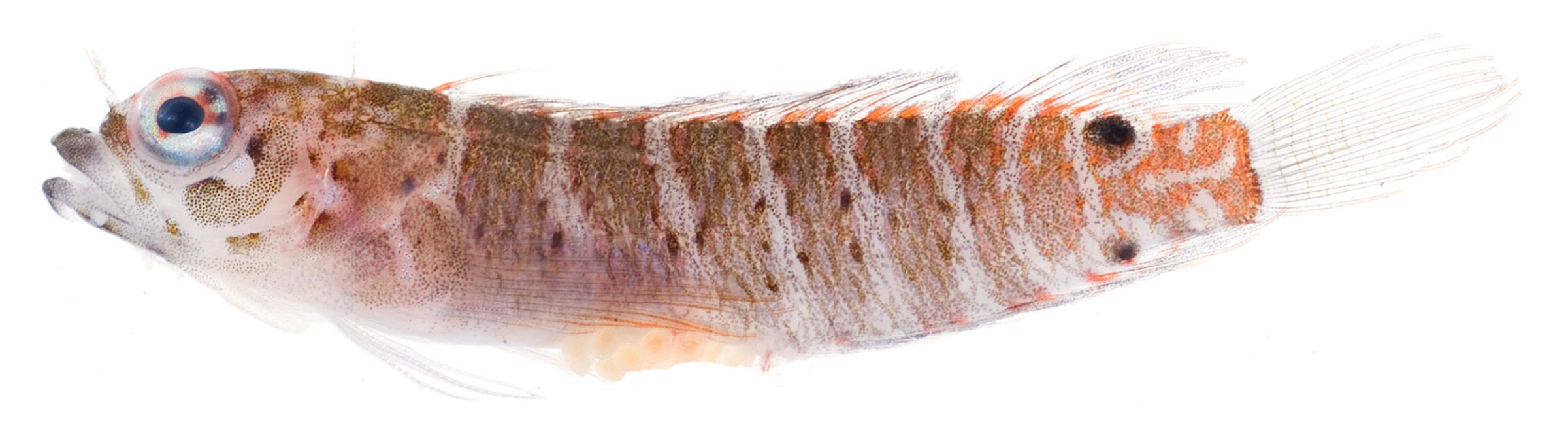
- Female (length 16 mm)

Conservation status
- Least Concern (IUCN 3.1)

Scientific classification
- Kingdom: Animalia
- Phylum: Chordata
- Class: Actinopterygii
- Order: Blenniiformes
- Family: Labrisomidae
- Genus: Starksia
- Species: S. sangreyae

Binomial name
- Starksia sangreyae Castillo & C. C. Baldwin, 2011
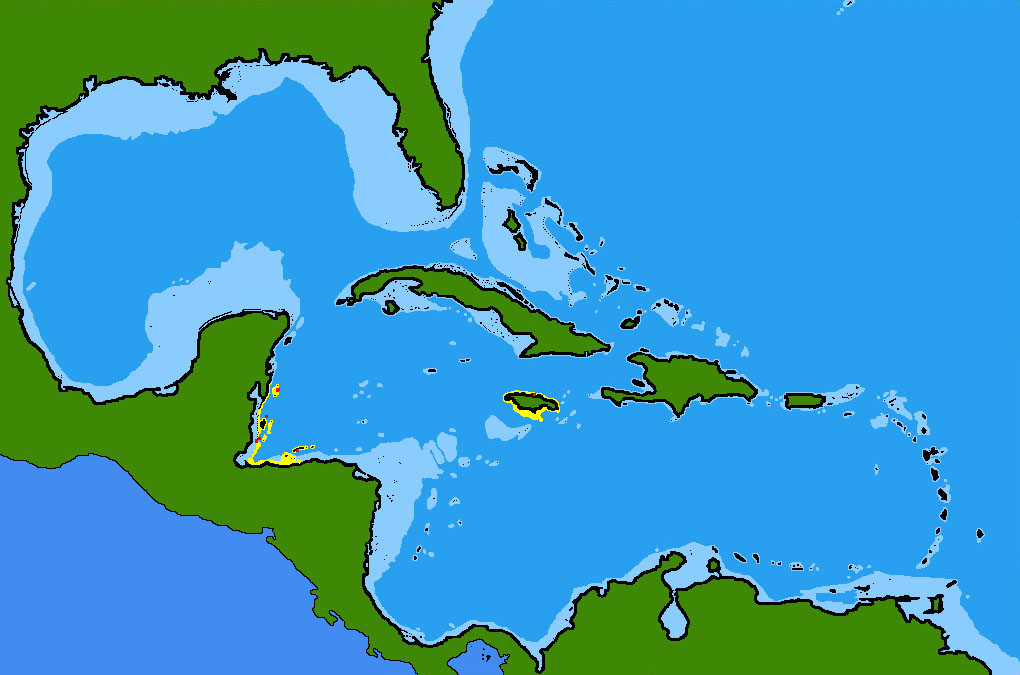

= Starksia sangreyae =

Species of fish

Starksia sangreyae, the Sangrey's blenny, is a species of labrisomid blenny native to the Caribbean coasts of Belize and probably also Honduras where it is found in shallow waters at depths of from 1 to 2 m (3.3 to 6.6 ft). It was originally known as Starksia atlantica, and is also closely related to Starksia springeri. The species is named after Mary Sangrey, a scientist from Smithsonian Institution. This species can reach a length of 1.6 cm (0.63 in) SL.
