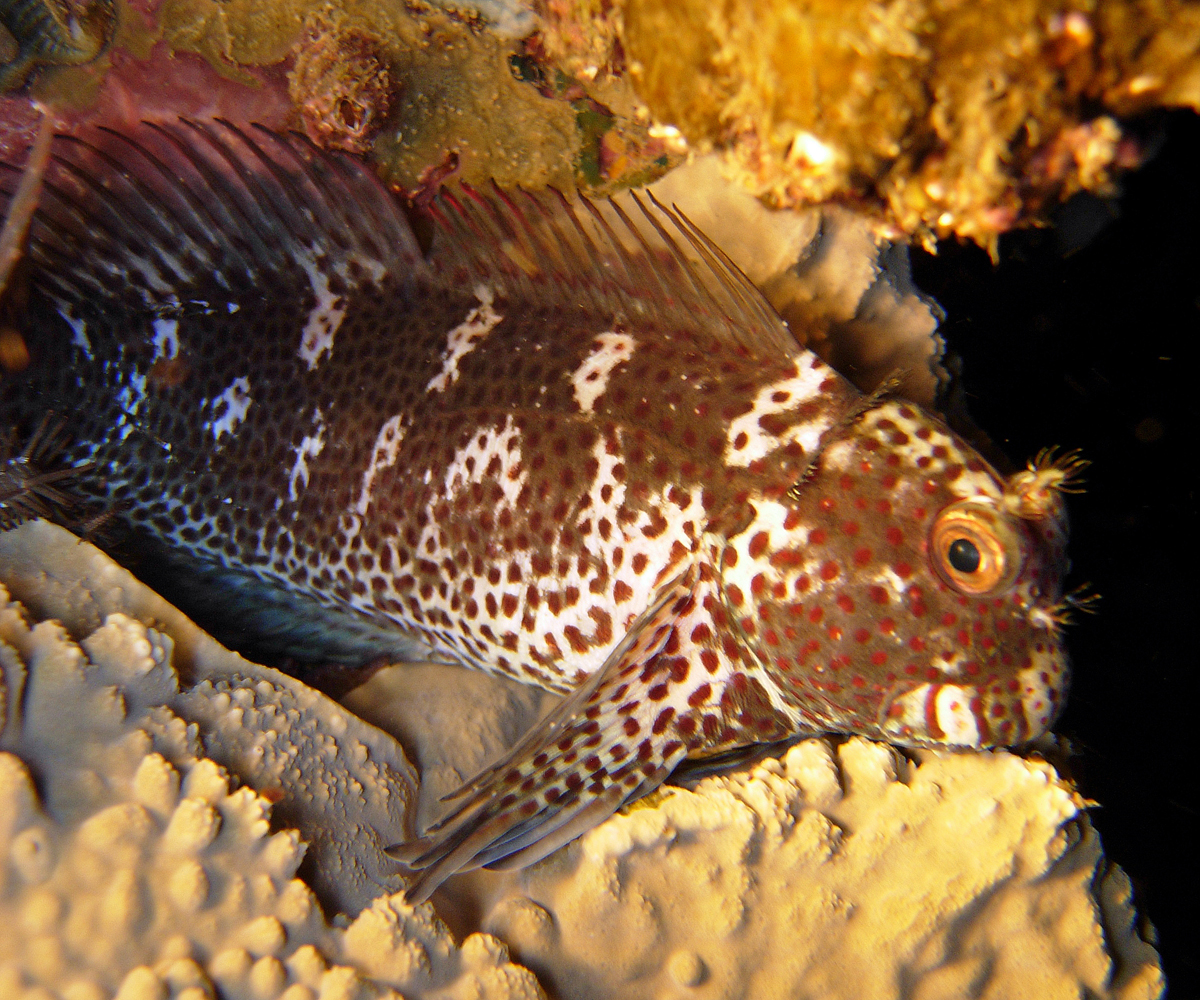

Conservation status
- Least Concern (IUCN 3.1)

Scientific classification
- Kingdom: Animalia
- Phylum: Chordata
- Class: Actinopterygii
- Order: Blenniiformes
- Family: Blenniidae
- Genus: Cirripectes
- Species: C. randalli

Binomial name
- Cirripectes randalli J. T. Williams, 1988

= Cirripectes randalli =

Species of fish

Cirripectes randalli is a species of combtooth blenny found in the western Indian Ocean. This species reaches a length of 10.7 centimetres (4.2 in) SL. The specific name honours the American ichthyologist John E. Randall of the Bishop Museum in Honolulu.
