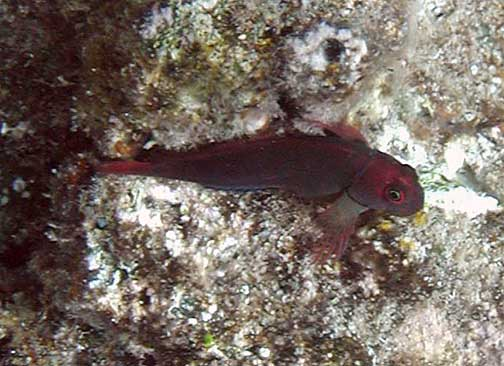

Conservation status
- Least Concern (IUCN 3.1)

Scientific classification
- Kingdom: Animalia
- Phylum: Chordata
- Class: Actinopterygii
- Order: Blenniiformes
- Family: Blenniidae
- Genus: Cirripectes
- Species: C. vanderbilti

Binomial name
- Cirripectes vanderbilti (Fowler, 1938)

= Cirripectes vanderbilti =

Species of fish

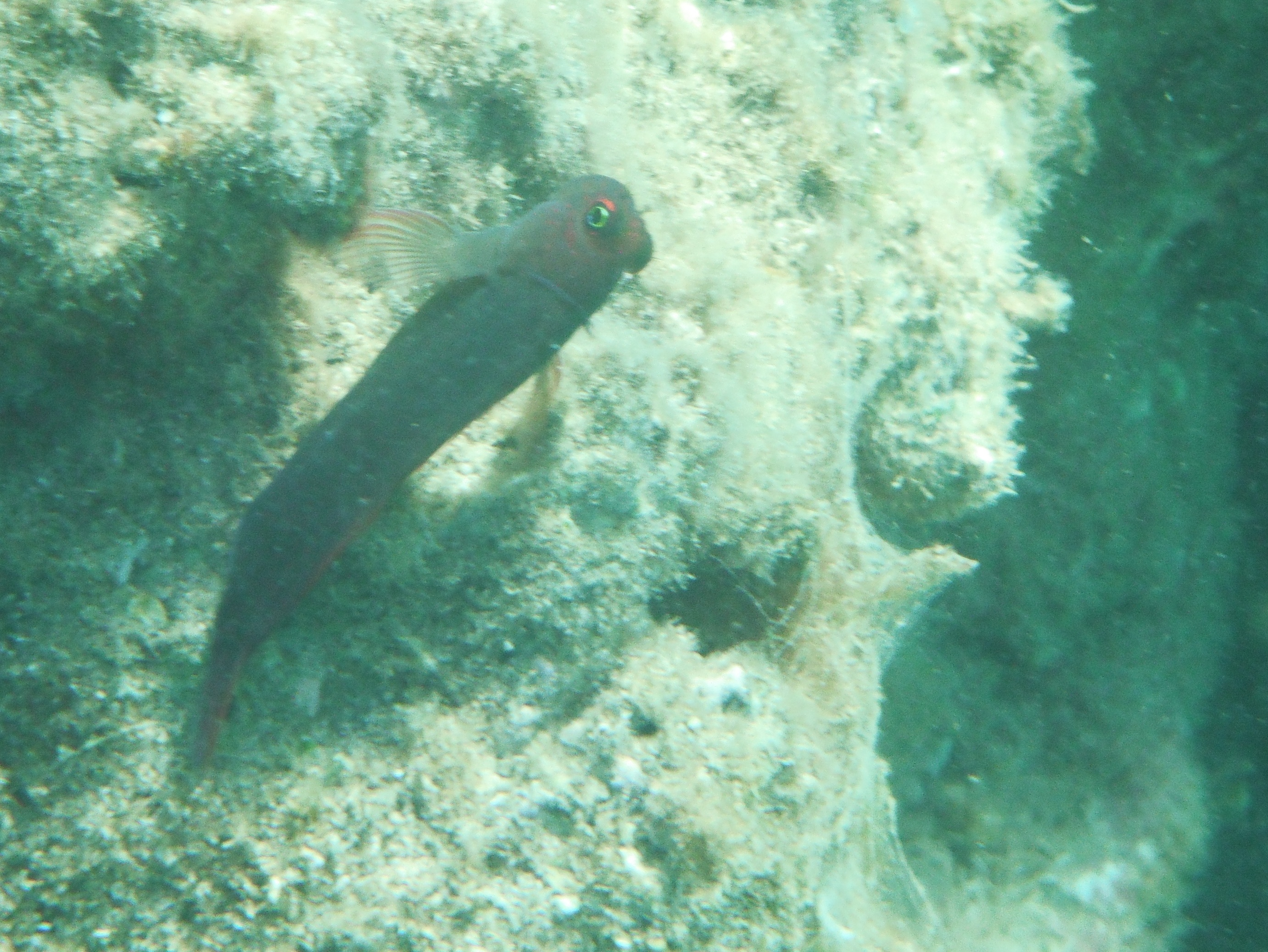
scarface blenny

Cirripectes vanderbilti, also known as the scarface blenny, is a species of combtooth blenny found in coral reefs in the Hawaiian and Johnston Atoll in the eastern central Pacific ocean. This species reaches a length of 10 cm (3.9 in) SL. It is commonly confused with Cirripectes variolosus.

The species was first described in 1938 by Henry W. Fowler under the name Ophioblennius vanderbilti from a specimen collected near Diamond Head, Oahu in 1937 by the George Vanderbilt South Pacific Expedition.

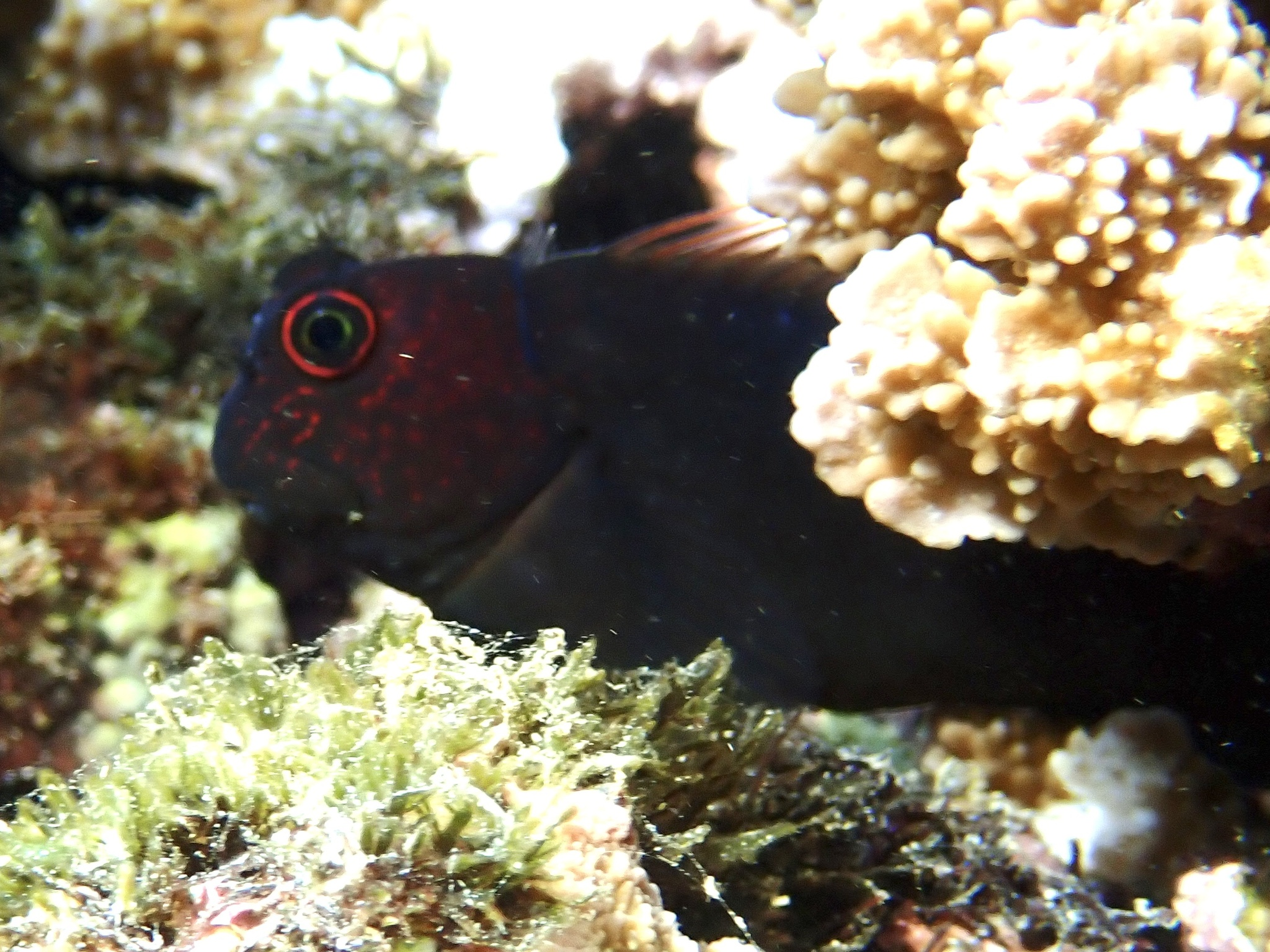
Scarface blenny

== Description ==
This species reaches a length of 10 cm (3.9 in) standard length. Adults have a dark brown (though rarely pale brown to white) body. The color pattern is highly variable. It has dark red to orange slashes on its head extending dorsal and posterior from the snout and encircling the eye. The dorsal fin has yellowish-brown rays; the upper caudal-fin rays are yellowish; and the lower rays are dark brown. Spines and soft rays are sometimes difficult to distinguish in the Hawaiian blennies, but can often be differentiated when the fin is held before a strong light, or by removing the membrane from one side of the fin. In general, the spines are soft and flexible but rather more slender than articulated rays.

== Distribution ==
The species was first described in 1938 by Henry W. Fowler under the name Ophioblennius vanderbilti from a specimen collected near Diamond Head, Oahu in 1937 by the George Vanderbilt South Pacific Expedition. The species is found in the Eastern Central Pacific: Hawaiian and Johnston islands.

== Habitat ==
The species inhabits shallow, rocky shores and reefs.
