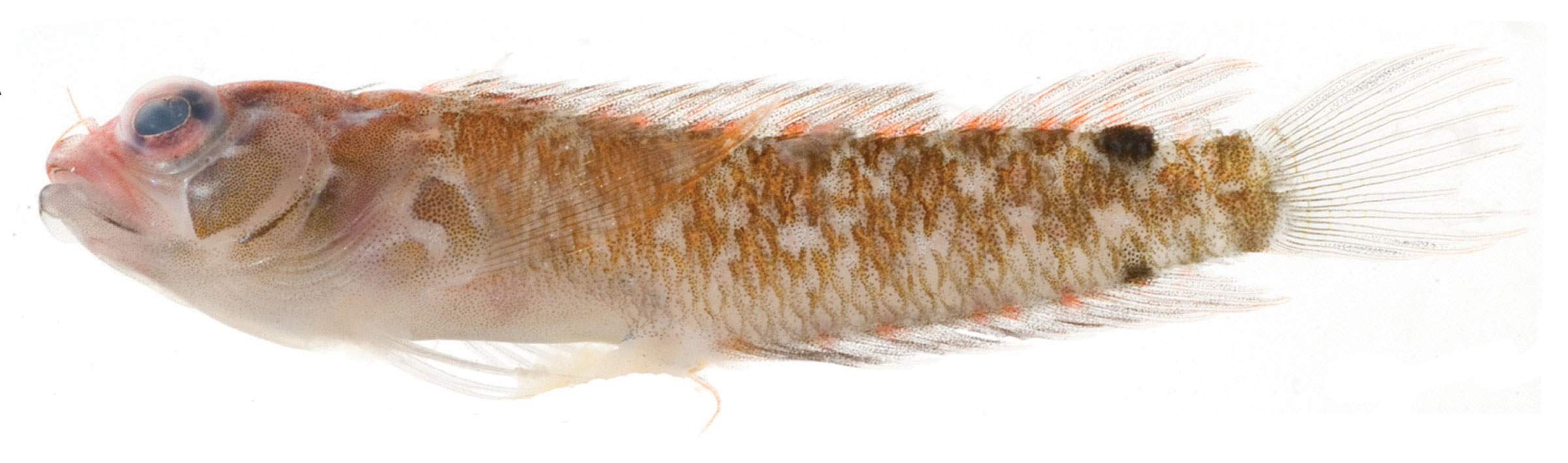
- Adult, length 15 mm

Conservation status
- Data Deficient (IUCN 3.1)

Scientific classification
- Kingdom: Animalia
- Phylum: Chordata
- Class: Actinopterygii
- Order: Blenniiformes
- Family: Labrisomidae
- Genus: Starksia
- Species: S. springeri

Binomial name
- Starksia springeri Castillo & C. C. Baldwin, 2011
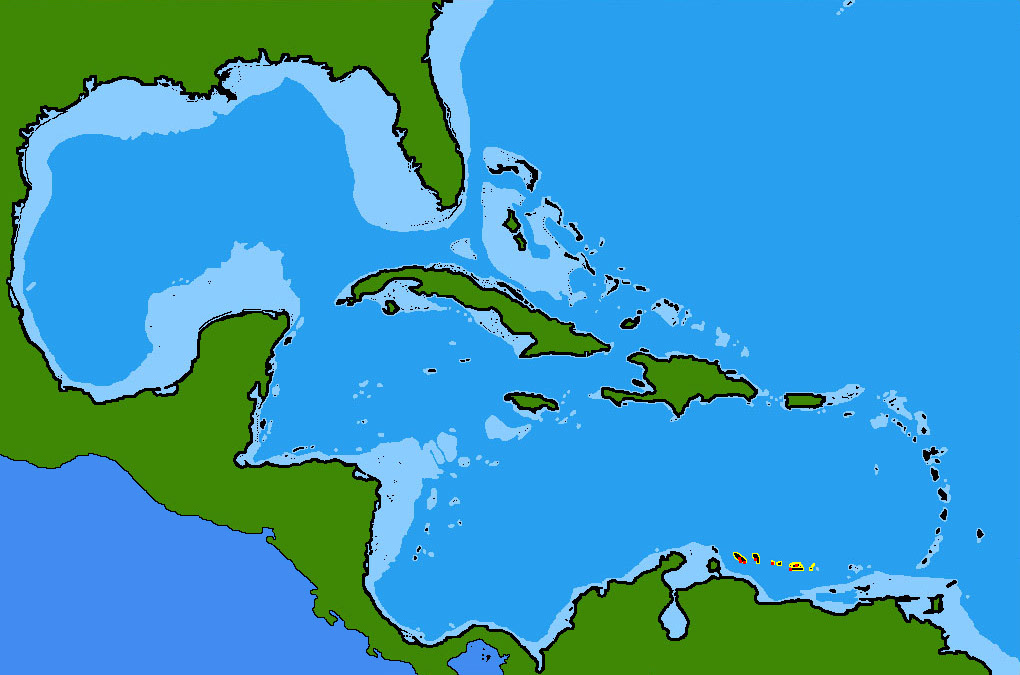

= Starksia springeri =

Species of fish

Starksia springeri, the Springer's blenny, is a species of labrisomid blenny endemic to the waters around Curaçao where it is found at depths of from 1 to 25 m (3.3 to 82.0 ft). It was originally known as Starksia atlantica, and is also closely related to Starksia sangreyae. The species is named after Victor G. Springer, a scientist from Smithsonian Institution. Males can reach a length of 1.5 centimetres (0.59 in) SL while females grow to 1.9 cm (0.75 in).
