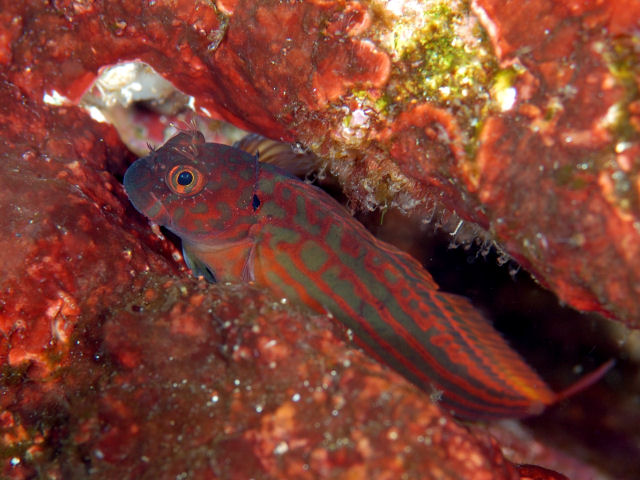

Conservation status
- Least Concern (IUCN 3.1)

Scientific classification
- Kingdom: Animalia
- Phylum: Chordata
- Class: Actinopterygii
- Order: Blenniiformes
- Family: Blenniidae
- Genus: Cirripectes
- Species: C. kuwamurai

Binomial name
- Cirripectes kuwamurai Fukao, 1984

= Cirripectes kuwamurai =

Species of fish

Cirripectes kuwamurai is a species of combtooth blenny found on rocky and coral reefs in the northwest Pacific ocean off Japan. This species reaches a length of 5.5 centimetres (2.2 in) SL. The specific name honours the Japanese fish ecologist Tetsuo Kuwamura who collected the type.
