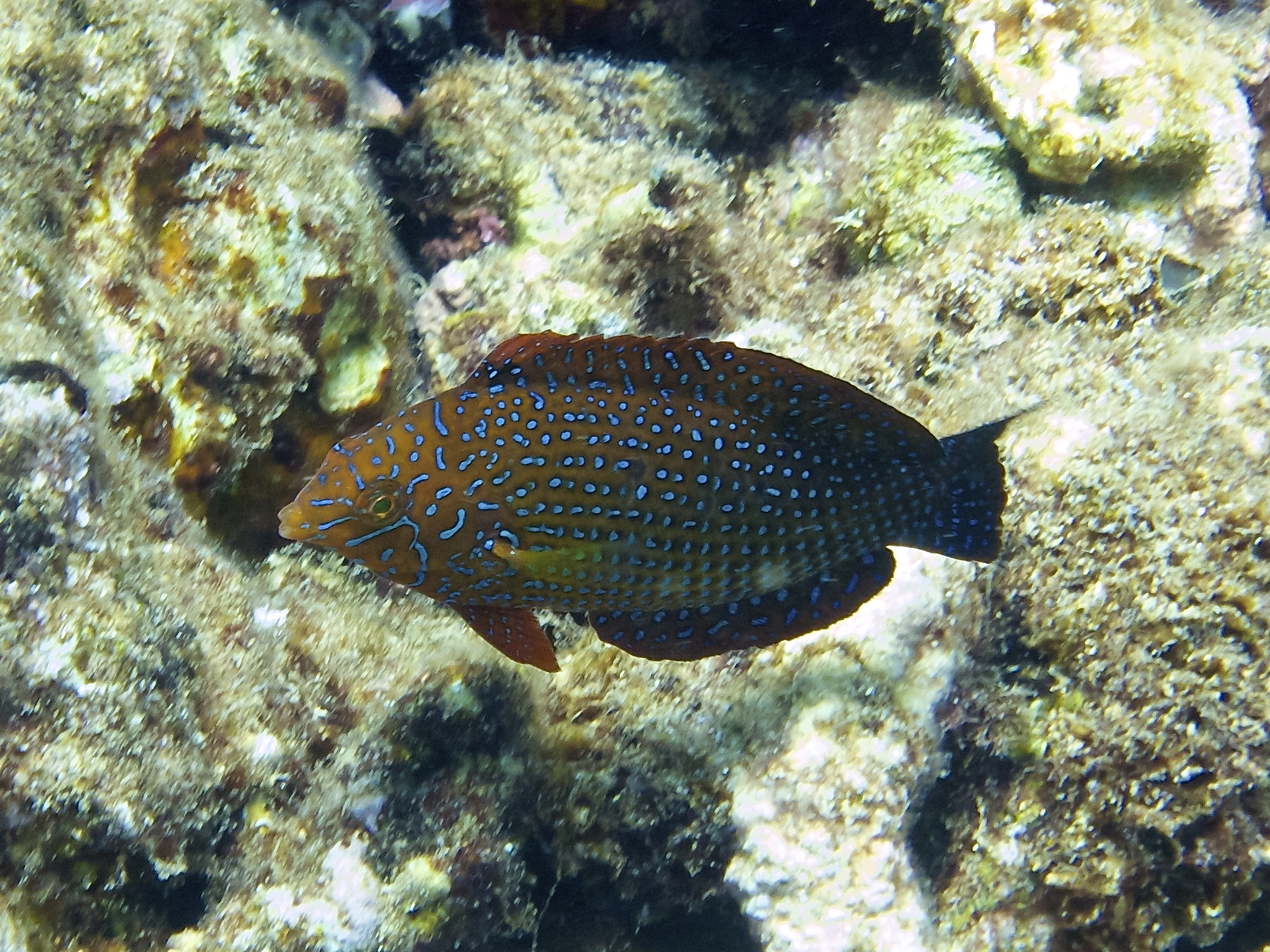

Conservation status
- Least Concern (IUCN 3.1)

Scientific classification
- Kingdom: Animalia
- Phylum: Chordata
- Class: Actinopterygii
- Order: Labriformes
- Family: Labridae
- Genus: Macropharyngodon
- Species: M. geoffroy

Binomial name
- Macropharyngodon geoffroy Quoy & Gaimard, 1824

= Macropharyngodon geoffroy =

Species of fish

Macropharyngodon geoffroy, also known as the Geoffroy's wrasse, is a member of the wrasse family endemic to the Hawaiian Islands. It occasionally makes its way into the aquarium trade. It grows to a length of 13 cm (5.1 in). This benthopelagic species occurs in areas of mixed sand, rubble, and coral on seaward reefs where it feeds mostly on molluscs, especially prosobranch gastropods) and foraminiferans. Macropharyngodon geoffroy is the type species of the genus Macropharyngodon.
