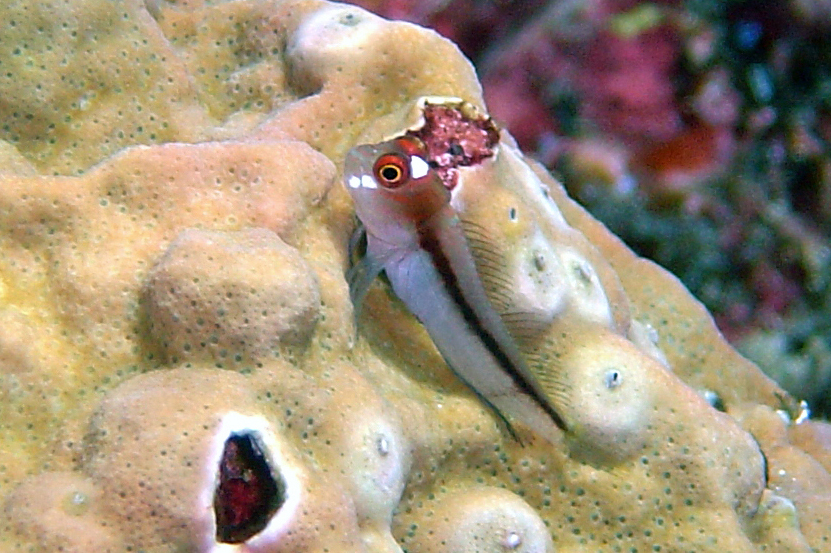

Conservation status
- Least Concern (IUCN 3.1)

Scientific classification
- Kingdom: Animalia
- Phylum: Chordata
- Class: Actinopterygii
- Order: Blenniiformes
- Family: Blenniidae
- Genus: Cirripectes
- Species: C. polyzona

Binomial name
- Cirripectes polyzona (Bleeker, 1868)

Synonyms
- Salarias polyzona Bleeker, 1868; Blennius canescens Garman, 1903

= Cirripectes polyzona =

Species of fish

Cirripectes polyzona, the barred blenny, is a species of combtooth blenny found in coral reefs in the Indo-West pacific region. This species reaches a length of 13 centimetres (5.1 in) TL.
