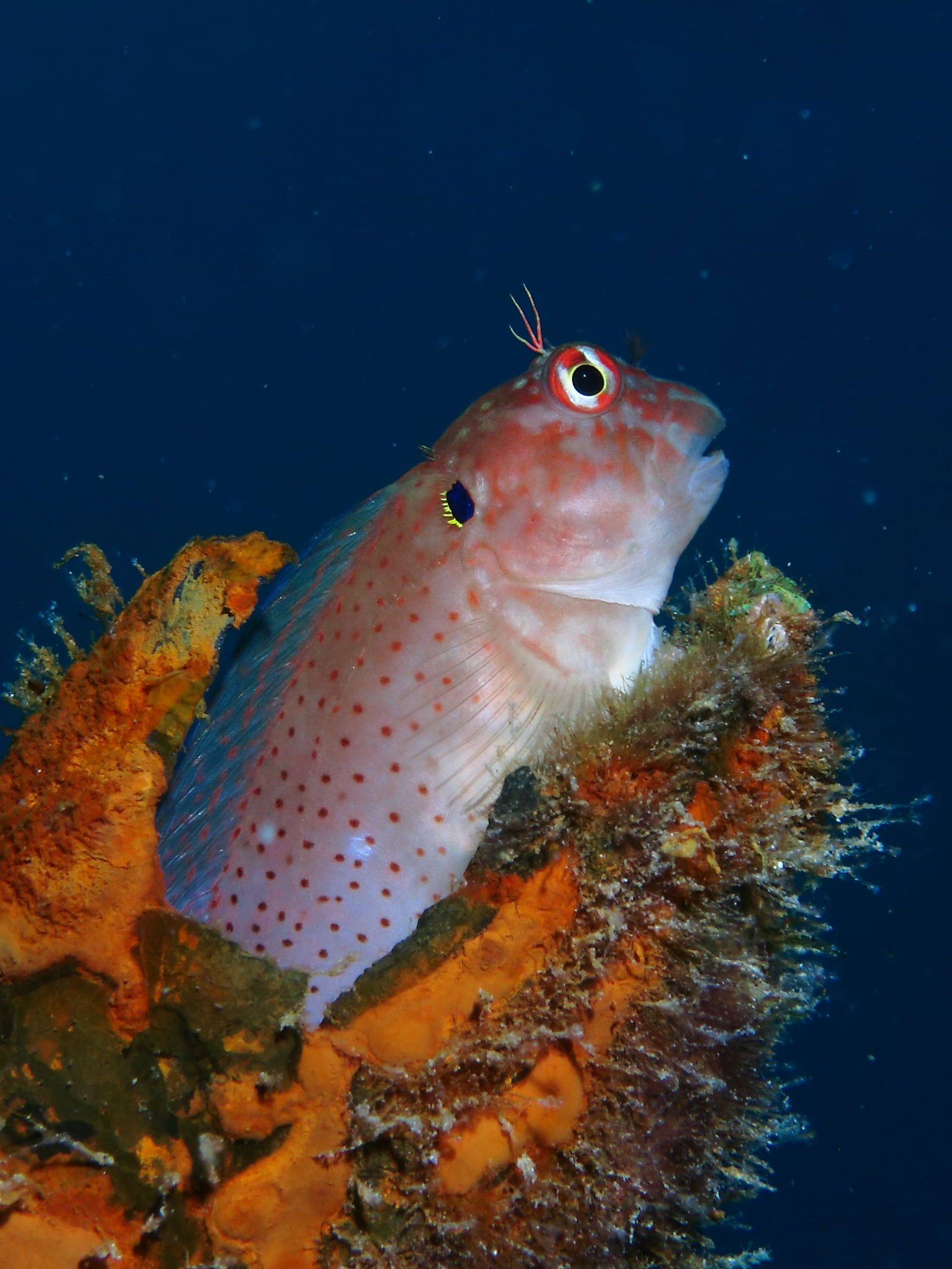

Conservation status
- Least Concern (IUCN 3.1)

Scientific classification
- Kingdom: Animalia
- Phylum: Chordata
- Class: Actinopterygii
- Order: Blenniiformes
- Family: Blenniidae
- Genus: Cirripectes
- Species: C. auritus

Binomial name
- Cirripectes auritus Carlson, 1981

= Cirripectes auritus =

Species of fish

Cirripectes auritus, the blackflap blenny, is a species of combtooth blenny found in coral reefs in the Indo-West Pacific region.

This species reaches a length of 9 centimetres (3.5 in) TL.
