= George Vanderbilt Sumatran Expedition =

1930s scientific expedition

The George Vanderbilt Sumatran Expedition (1936–1939) was a scientific expedition organized and financed by George Washington Vanderbilt III.

== 1936 ==
In February and March 1936 Vanderbilt, accompanied by his wife Lucille Vanderbilt née Parsons, used his yacht to visit Sumatra and conduct a preliminary expedition, on which he collected a few specimens of birds.

== 1937 (The George Vanderbilt South Pacific Expedition of 1937) ==
In 1937 Vanderbilt chartered the schooner Cressida to cruise the South Pacific on a scientific expedition to collect fish specimens under the auspices of the Academy of Natural Sciences of Philadelphia. On the cruise Mr. and Mrs. Vanderbilt were accompanied by Mr. and Mrs. Samuel B. Jones III as guests. William B. Gray was in charge of fishing activities. With Ronald W. Smith as the expedition's zoologist, the expedition collected about 10,000 individual specimens, excluding a great many larval and immature forms. The 10,000 fish specimens represented 434 (alleged) species and 210 (alleged) genera. The expedition discovered 22 allegedly new species with 5 allegedly new genera (although revisions have been made because of molecular phylogenetics). For example, Fowler's Machaerenchelys vanderbilti has been rejected in favor of Leiuranus semicintus, Acanthapogon vanderbilti has been rejected in favor of Gymnapogon vanderbilti, and Ophioblennius vanderbilti has been rejected in favor of Cirripectes vanderbilti.

The Cressida left New York City on January 13 and reached Palm Beach, Florida, on January 22. In early February 1937 the expedition collected specimens of birds from Malpelo Island and several of the avian species collected had never before been sampled on that particular island. From February 14 to March 3 the Cressida was in the Galapagos Islands; there the expedition collected 9 lizards of 2 species with 1 genus and 2 snakes of 2 species with 1 genus. From April 7 to April 23 the Cressida was in the Society Islands; in that vicinity the expedition collected about 2400 fish specimens. From May 5 to May 7 the Cressida was anchored off Christmas Island; near that island the expedition collected about 5,000 fish specimens. From May 24 to May 31 the Cressida was anchored at Honolulu; there the expedition disbanded and, via the Panama Canal, the crew returned the schooner to New York City on July 18.

== 1938 ==
In 1938 George Vanderbilt purchased the Cressida and changed the schooner's name to Pioneer.

== 1939 ==
Vanderbilt persuaded the Academy of Natural Sciences of Philadelphia to sponsor two professional scientists, an ornithologist and a mammalogist, to help him conduct an expedition, which occurred from the middle of March to the middle of June 1939. On 17 March 1939 the main part of the expedition began with Mr. and Mrs. Vanderbilt, the ornithologist S. Dillon Ripley as bird collector, the mammalogist Frederick A. Ulmer Jr. as mammal collector, and B. Berthold, a resident of Medan, in charge of arranging and organizing the transportation. The goal was to collect specimens in the province of Atjeh in northern Sumatra. Ripley and Ulmer did not reach Sumatra aboard the Vanderbilts' yacht but instead left together from New York on February 17, then arrived at Belawan via Marseilles, the Suez Canal, and Colombo, Ceylon. After the main part of the expedition was complete, Ripley and Ulmer, while waiting for a steamer to take them home, spent 12 days collecting on the island of Nias. Ripley and Ulmer collected specimens from 4 new species of fish with 2 new genera. Ulmer collected specimens of mammals from the southern part of the province of Atjeh, the island of Nias, and some of the provinces of Sumatra's eastern coast. The expedition collected one amphibian and some reptile specimens from Atjeh. Ripley and Ulmer collected some botanical material from Mount Leuser.
