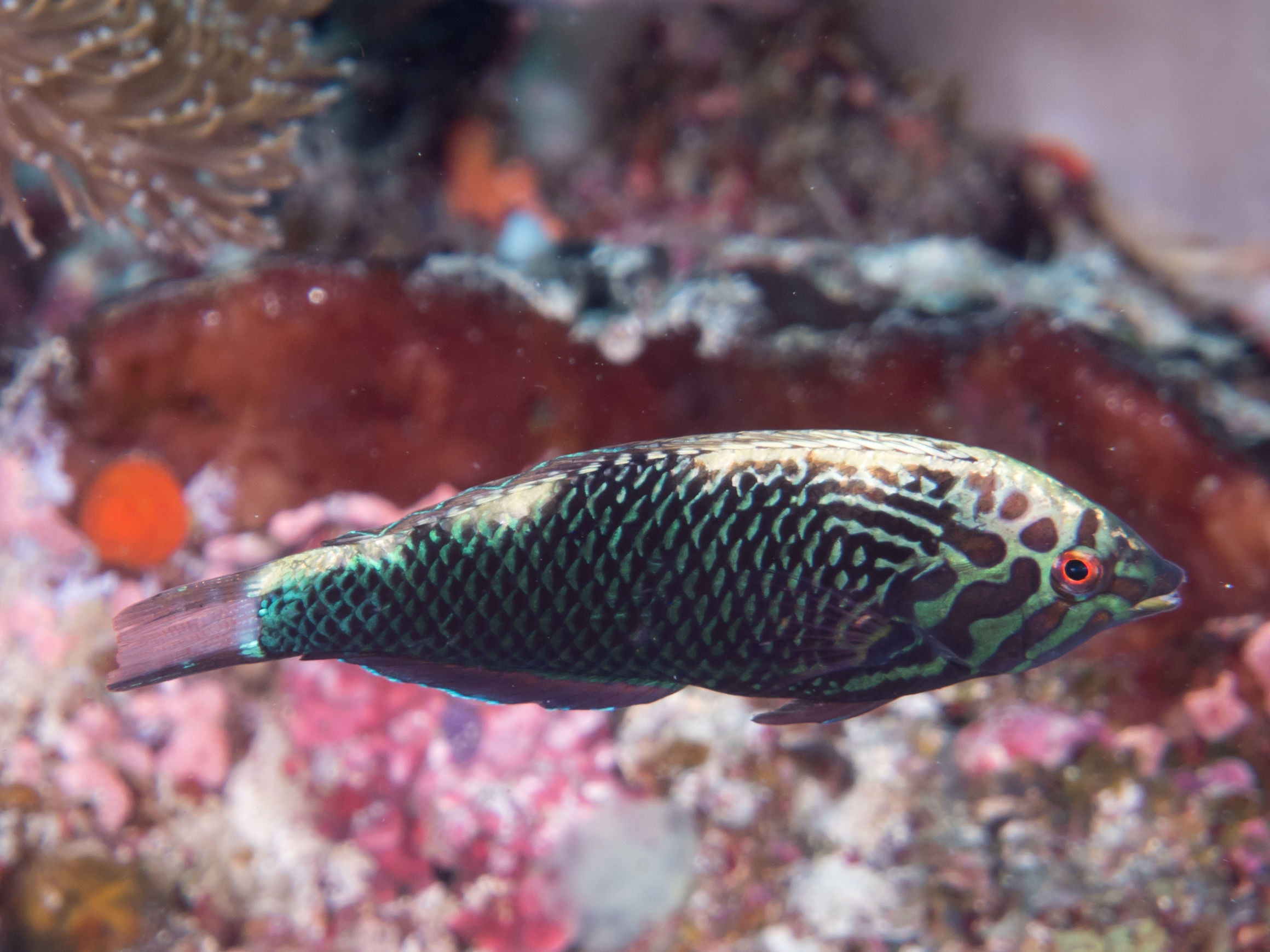
- Adult female

Conservation status
- Least Concern (IUCN 3.1)

Scientific classification
- Kingdom: Animalia
- Phylum: Chordata
- Class: Actinopterygii
- Order: Labriformes
- Family: Labridae
- Genus: Macropharyngodon
- Species: M. negrosensis

Binomial name
- Macropharyngodon negrosensis Herre, 1932

= Macropharyngodon negrosensis =

Species of fish

Macropharyngodon negrosensis, the yellow-spotted wrasse, black Leopard-wrasse or black Wrasse, is a species of marine ray-finned fish from the family Labridae, the wrasses.

== Description ==
The basic colour of this species is blackish, with the scales in males edged in pale green, or marked with small, pale spots in females. Both sexes have black anal and pelvic fins, while the caudal fin is contrastingly pale although the males have blackish lobes.

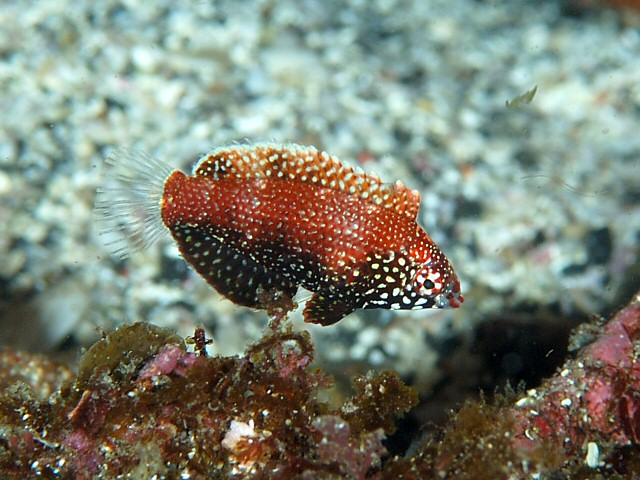
Younger juvenile

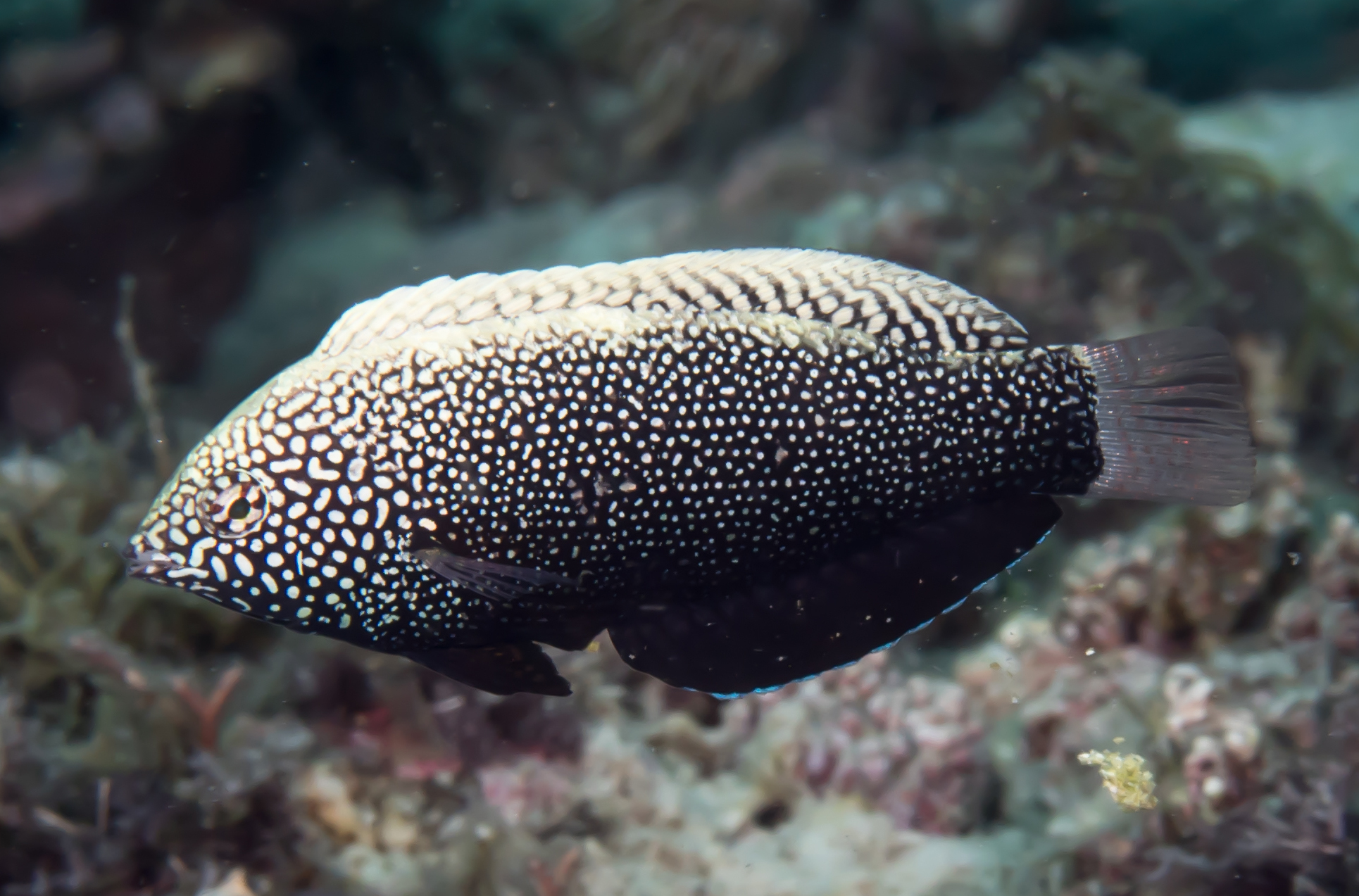
Older juvenile

== Distribution ==
Its distribution extends from the Andaman Sea and Christmas Island to the Philippines and Samoa, extending north to the Ryukyu Islands and south to northern Australia.

== Biology ==
This species is found in lagoon and seaward reefs where there are areas of mixed sand and coral. The juveniles are transported by currents away from their normal breeding range. These fish are frequently encountered in pairs or small loose groups, normally close to the bottom. When approached, they react by moving up and down in a distinctive manner which may confuse a potential predator. Its diet consists of small benthic animals.
