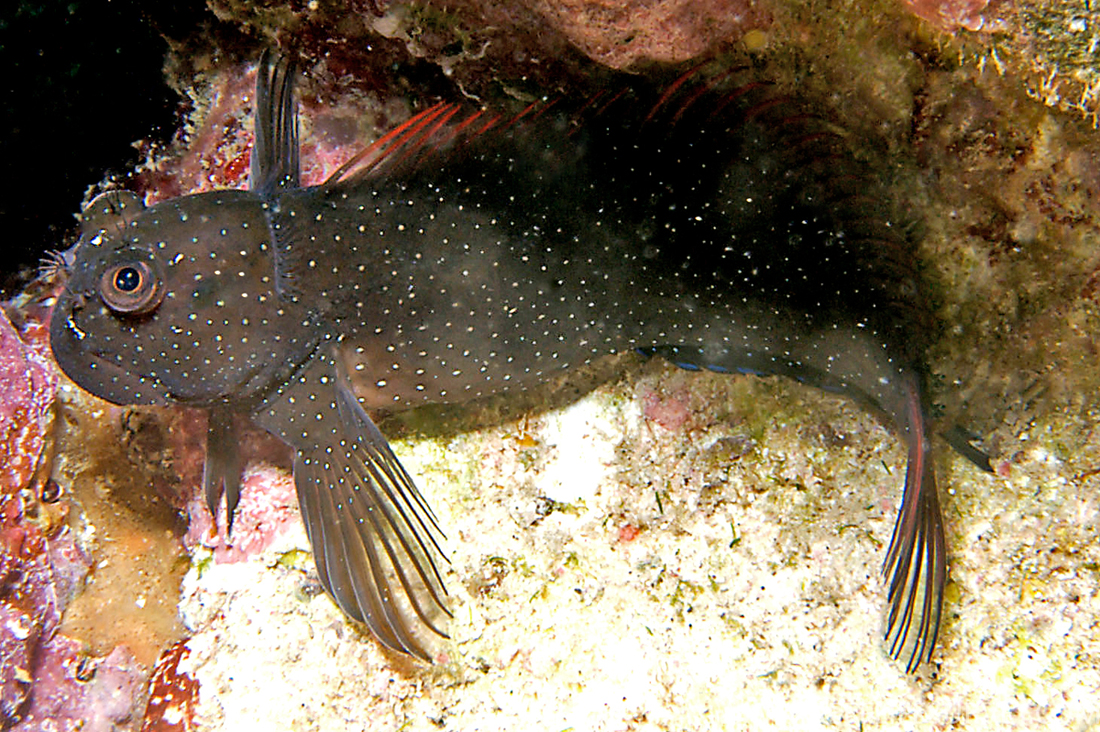

Conservation status
- Least Concern (IUCN 3.1)

Scientific classification
- Kingdom: Animalia
- Phylum: Chordata
- Class: Actinopterygii
- Order: Blenniiformes
- Family: Blenniidae
- Genus: Cirripectes
- Species: C. alboapicalis

Binomial name
- Cirripectes alboapicalis (J. D. Ogilby, 1899)

Synonyms
- Salarias alboapicalis Ogilby, 1899

= Cirripectes alboapicalis =

Species of fish

Cirripectes alboapicalis is a species of combtooth blenny found in coral reefs in the Pacific ocean. This species reaches a maximum length of 15.5 centimetres (6.1 in).
