= Cirripectes fuscoguttatus =

Conservation status
- Least Concern (IUCN 3.1)

Scientific classification
- Kingdom: Animalia
- Phylum: Chordata
- Class: Actinopterygii
- Order: Blenniiformes
- Family: Blenniidae
- Genus: Cirripectes
- Species: C. fuscoguttatus

Binomial name
- Cirripectes fuscoguttatus Strasburg & L. P. Schultz, 1953

Species of fish

Cirripectes fuscoguttatus, the spotted blenny, is a species of combtooth blenny found in coral reefs in the Pacific ocean. This species reaches a length of 15 centimetres (5.9 in) TL.
