= Scartella caboverdiana =

Conservation status
- Least Concern (IUCN 3.1)

Scientific classification
- Kingdom: Animalia
- Phylum: Chordata
- Class: Actinopterygii
- Order: Blenniiformes
- Family: Blenniidae
- Genus: Scartella
- Species: S. caboverdiana

Binomial name
- Scartella caboverdiana Bath, 1990

Species of fish

Scartella caboverdiana is a species of combtooth blenny found in the eastern central Atlantic Ocean, around Cape Verde. This species reaches a length of 6 centimetres (2.4 in) TL.
