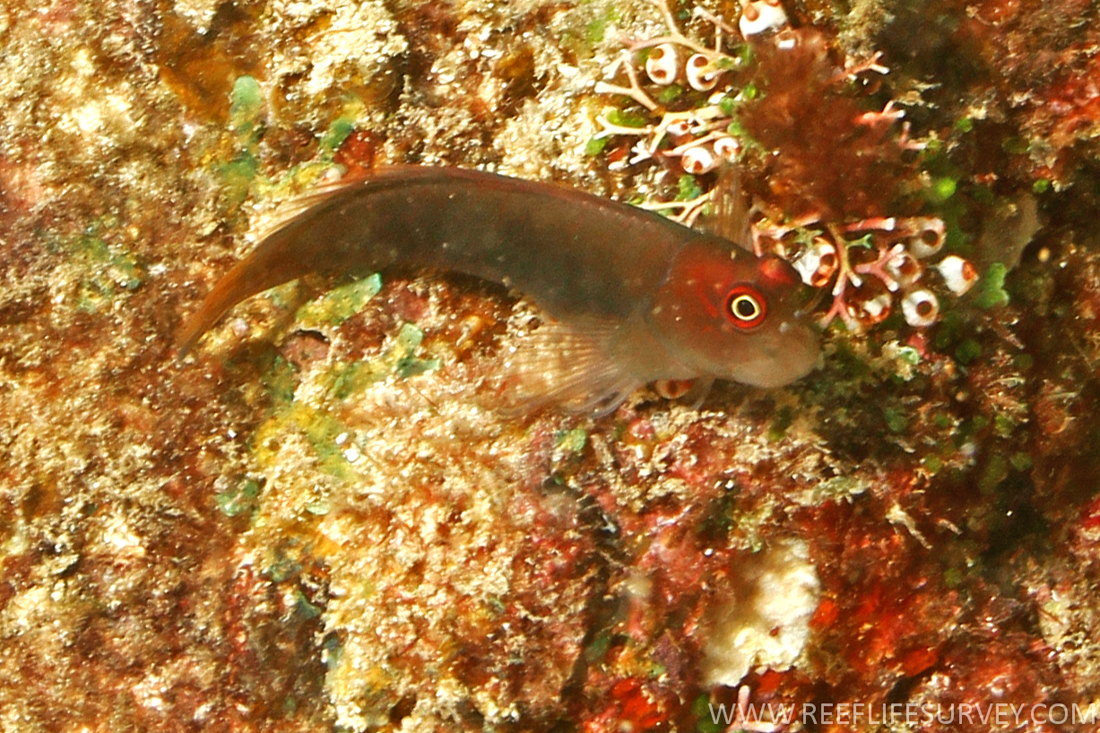

Conservation status
- Least Concern (IUCN 3.1)

Scientific classification
- Kingdom: Animalia
- Phylum: Chordata
- Class: Actinopterygii
- Order: Blenniiformes
- Family: Blenniidae
- Genus: Cirripectes
- Species: C. filamentosus

Binomial name
- Cirripectes filamentosus (Alleyne & W. J. Macleay, 1877)

Synonyms
- Salarias filamentosus Alleyne & Macleay, 1877; Salarias cruentipinnis Day, 1888; Cirripectes indrambaryae J. L. B. Smith, 1934

= Cirripectes filamentosus =

Species of fish

Cirripectes filamentosus, the filamentous blenny, is a species of combtooth blenny found in coral reefs in the western Pacific and Indian oceans. This species reaches a length of 9 centimetres (3.5 in) TL.
