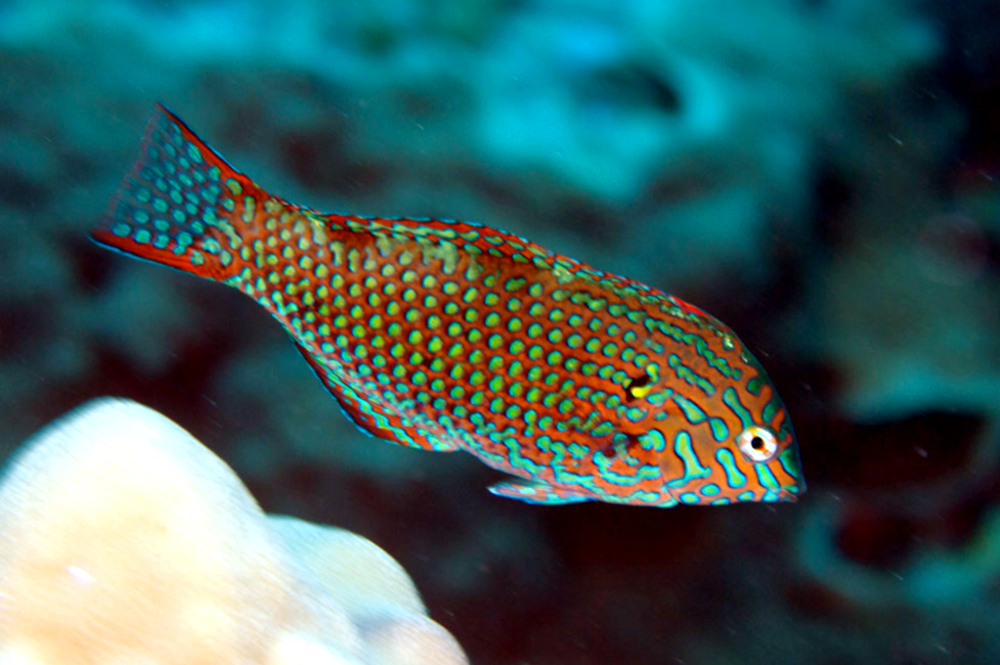
- male
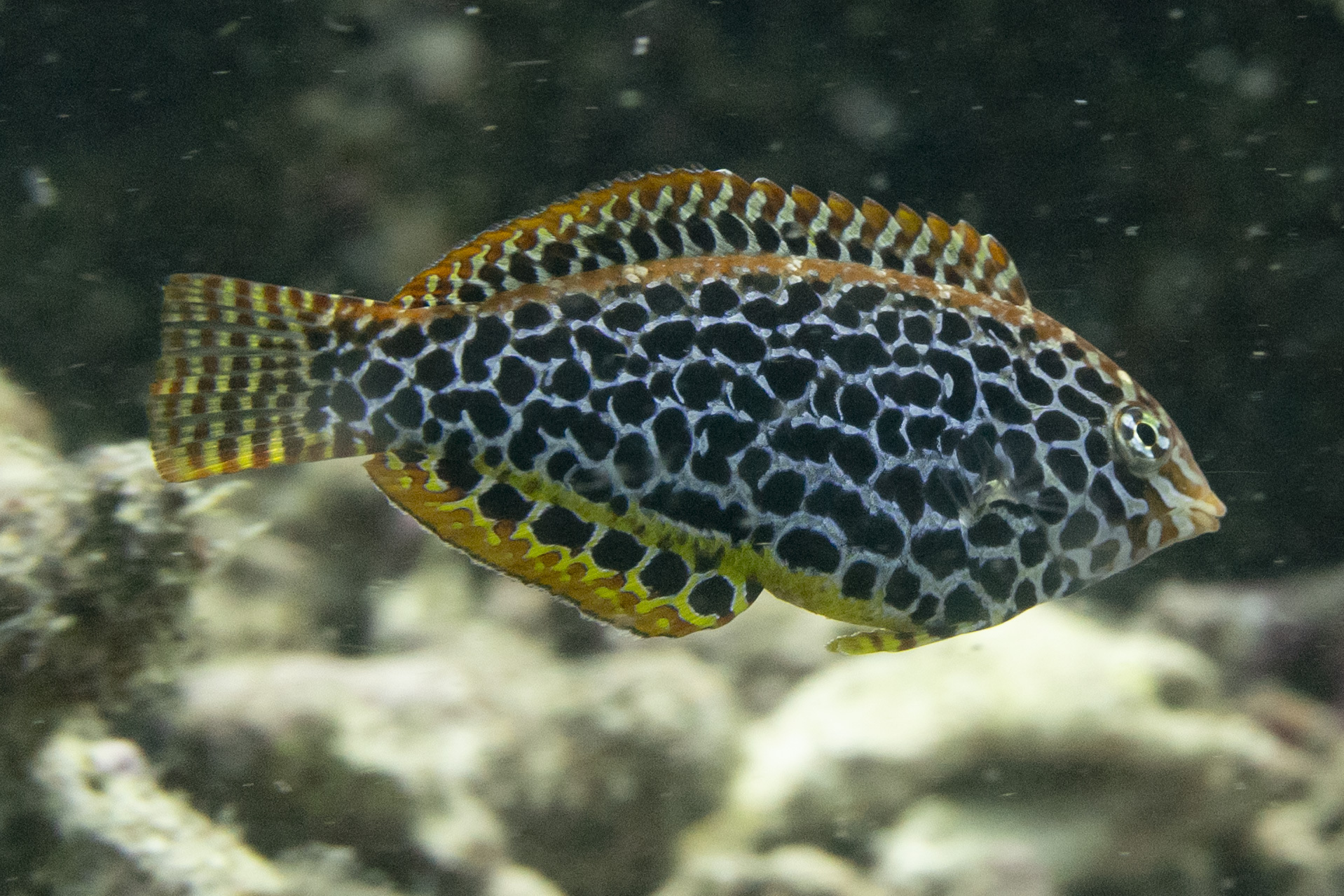
- female

Conservation status
- Least Concern (IUCN 3.1)

Scientific classification
- Kingdom: Animalia
- Phylum: Chordata
- Class: Actinopterygii
- Order: Labriformes
- Family: Labridae
- Genus: Macropharyngodon
- Species: M. meleagris

Binomial name
- Macropharyngodon meleagris (Valenciennes, 1839)

Synonyms
- Julis meleagris Valenciennes, 1839; Leptojulis pardalis Kner, 1867; Macropharyngodon pardalis (Kner, 1867); Platyglossus nigromaculatus Günther, 1872; Halichoeres nigropunctatus Seale, 1901; Wetmorella nigropunctata (Seale, 1901)

= Macropharyngodon meleagris =

Species of fish

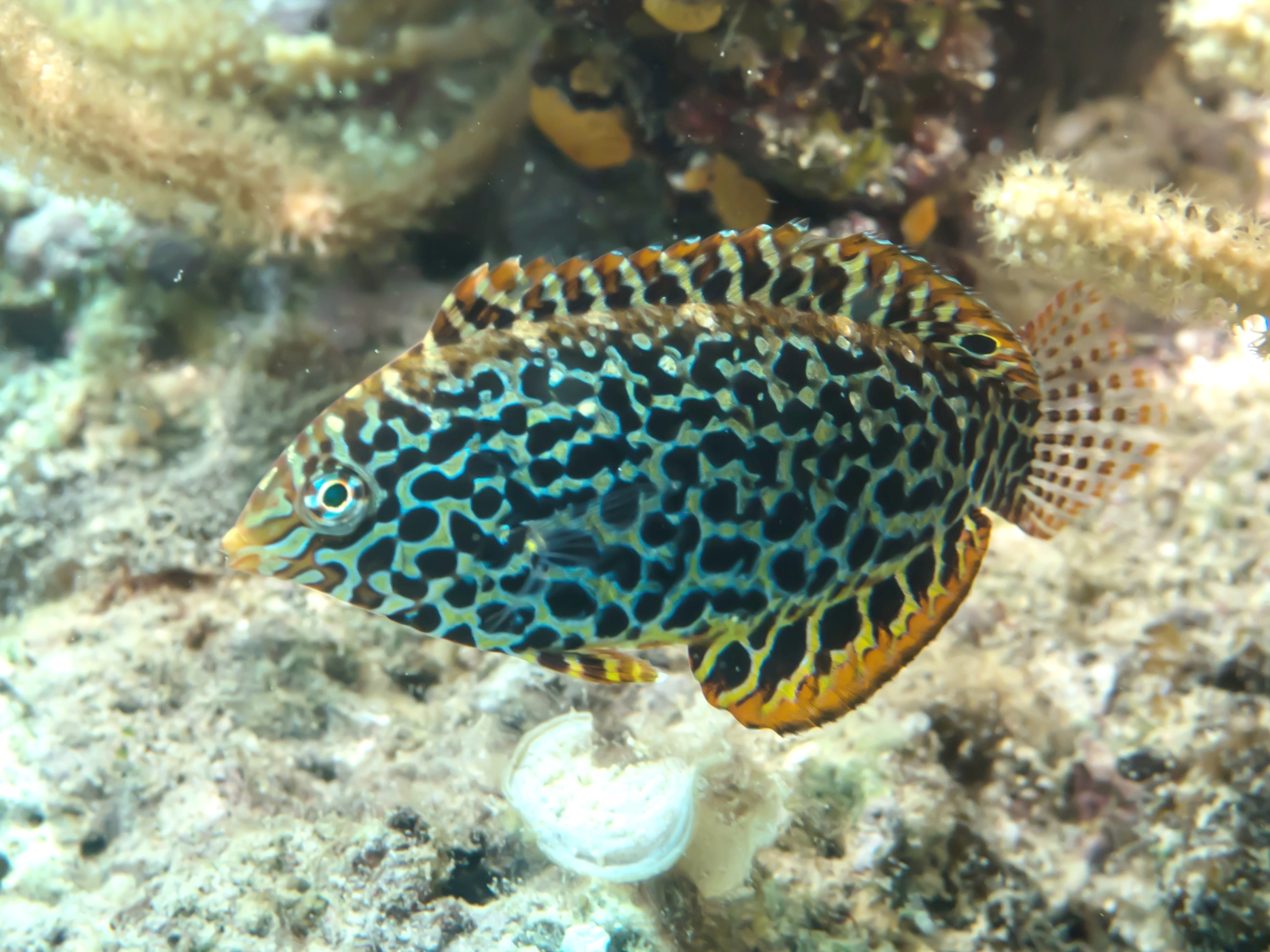
juvenile

Macropharyngodon meleagris, the black-spotted wrasse, Eastern leopard wrasse or reticulated wrasse, is a species of ray-finned fish from the family Labridae, the wrasses. This species is native to the eastern Indian Ocean and the Pacific Ocean. It lives on coral reefs at depths of from the surface to 30 metres (98 ft). This species can reach a length of 15 centimetres (5.9 in) SL. It can also be found in the aquarium trade. Juveniles display different color patterns than adults with dominating light colors and eyespots blending in with soft coral habitats and potentially avoiding predation.
