= Cirripectes obscurus =

Conservation status
- Least Concern (IUCN 3.1)

Scientific classification
- Kingdom: Animalia
- Phylum: Chordata
- Class: Actinopterygii
- Order: Blenniiformes
- Family: Blenniidae
- Genus: Cirripectes
- Species: C. obscurus

Binomial name
- Cirripectes obscurus (Borodin, 1927)

Synonyms
- Exallias obscurus Borodin, 1927

Species of fish

Cirripectes obscurus, the gargantuan blenny, is a species of combtooth blenny considered endemic to coral reefs in the Hawaiian island chain. It's perhaps the largest and most colorful of the Hawaiian blennies.

== Description ==
Cirripectes obscurus, lives in dark holes in the surf zone and is therefore rarely observed. This large species is purplish-brown with white speckles and irregular vertical bands, while the back and tail are dark brown with scattered white dots. Nuptial males have a vivid orange head and can reach up to eight inches in length. This species reaches a length of 20 centimetres (7.9 in) TL.

== Distribution and habitat ==
Cirripectes obscurus is endemic to the Hawaiian Islands, although one putative specimen has been collected in the Austral Islands. This species lives on shallow reefs and lagoons at depths ranging from 3 to 20 feet (1 to 6 meters). Cirripectes obscurus, lives in dark holes in the surf zone and is therefore rarely observed.
