= Cirripectes springeri =

Conservation status
- Least Concern (IUCN 3.1)

Scientific classification
- Kingdom: Animalia
- Phylum: Chordata
- Class: Actinopterygii
- Order: Blenniiformes
- Family: Blenniidae
- Genus: Cirripectes
- Species: C. springeri

Binomial name
- Cirripectes springeri J. T. Williams, 1988

Species of fish

Cirripectes springeri, Springer's blenny or the spotted eyelash blenny, is a species of combtooth blenny found in coral reefs in the western Pacific Ocean. This species reaches a length of 10 centimetres (3.9 in) TL. The specific name honours the American ichthyologist Victor G. Springer of the United States National Museum who has worked extensively on blennies.
