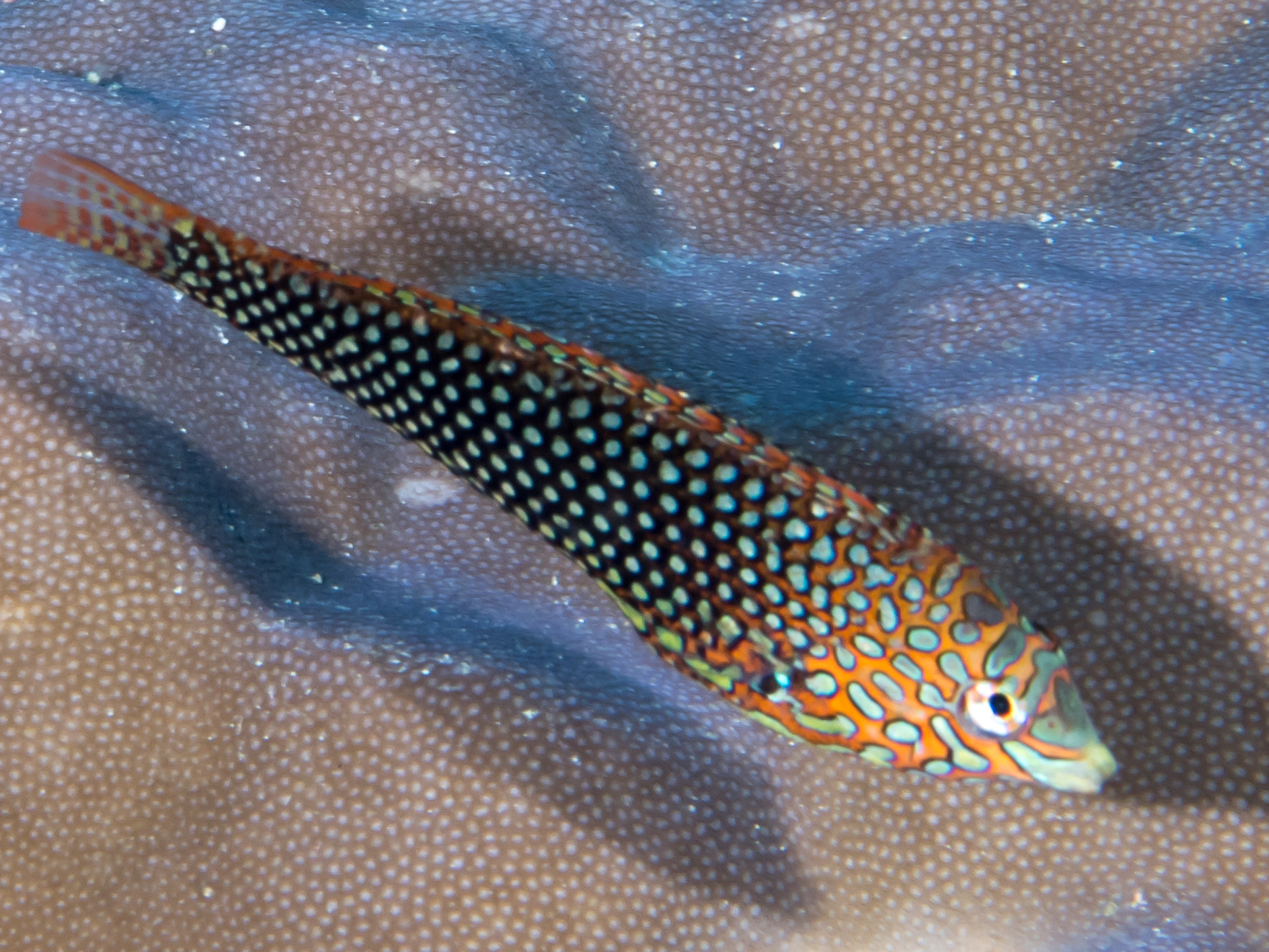

Conservation status
- Least Concern (IUCN 3.1)

Scientific classification
- Kingdom: Animalia
- Phylum: Chordata
- Class: Actinopterygii
- Order: Labriformes
- Family: Labridae
- Genus: Macropharyngodon
- Species: M. ornatus

Binomial name
- Macropharyngodon ornatus J. E. Randall, 1978

= Macropharyngodon ornatus =

Species of fish

Macropharyngodon ornatus, the false leopard or the ornate leopard wrasse, is a species of marine ray-finned fish from the family Labridae, the wrasses. It is found from Sri Lanka to western Australia, including Indonesia, although records from New Guinea have not been verified. This species occurs down to 30 metres (98 ft), singly or in small groups on sheltered seaward reefs or in lagoons in areas of mixed sand, rubble and coral. Its diet consists of small benthic animals. M. ornatus is collected for the aquarium trade.
