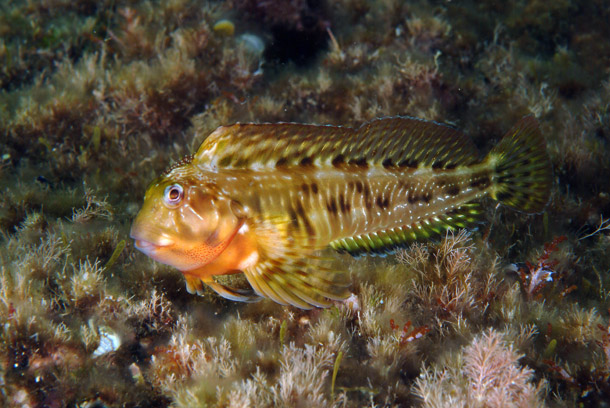
- Scartella cristata

Scientific classification
- Kingdom: Animalia
- Phylum: Chordata
- Class: Actinopterygii
- Order: Blenniiformes
- Family: Blenniidae
- Subfamily: Salarinae
- Genus: Scartella; D. S. Jordan, 1886

Type species
- Blennius microstomus Poey, 1860

Species
- See below.

= Scartella =

Genus of fishes

Scartella is a genus of combtooth blennies found in the Atlantic and Indian oceans.

== Species ==
There are currently seven recognized species in this genus:

- Scartella caboverdiana Bath, 1990
- Scartella cristata (Linnaeus, 1758) – Molly miller
- Scartella emarginata (Günther, 1861) – Maned blenny
- Scartella itajobi Rangel & L. F. Mendes, 2009
- Scartella nuchifilis (Valenciennes, 1836)
- Scartella poiti Rangel, Gasparini & R. Z. P. Guimarães, 2004
- Scartella springeri (Bauchot, 1967) – Springer's blenny
