= Scartella nuchifilis =

Conservation status
- Vulnerable (IUCN 3.1)

Scientific classification
- Kingdom: Animalia
- Phylum: Chordata
- Class: Actinopterygii
- Order: Blenniiformes
- Family: Blenniidae
- Genus: Scartella
- Species: S. nuchifilis

Binomial name
- Scartella nuchifilis (Valenciennes, 1836)

Species of fish

Scartella nuchifilis is a species of combtooth blenny found in the eastern Atlantic Ocean, in the Ascension Islands. This species reaches a length of 6.6 centimetres (2.6 in) SL.
