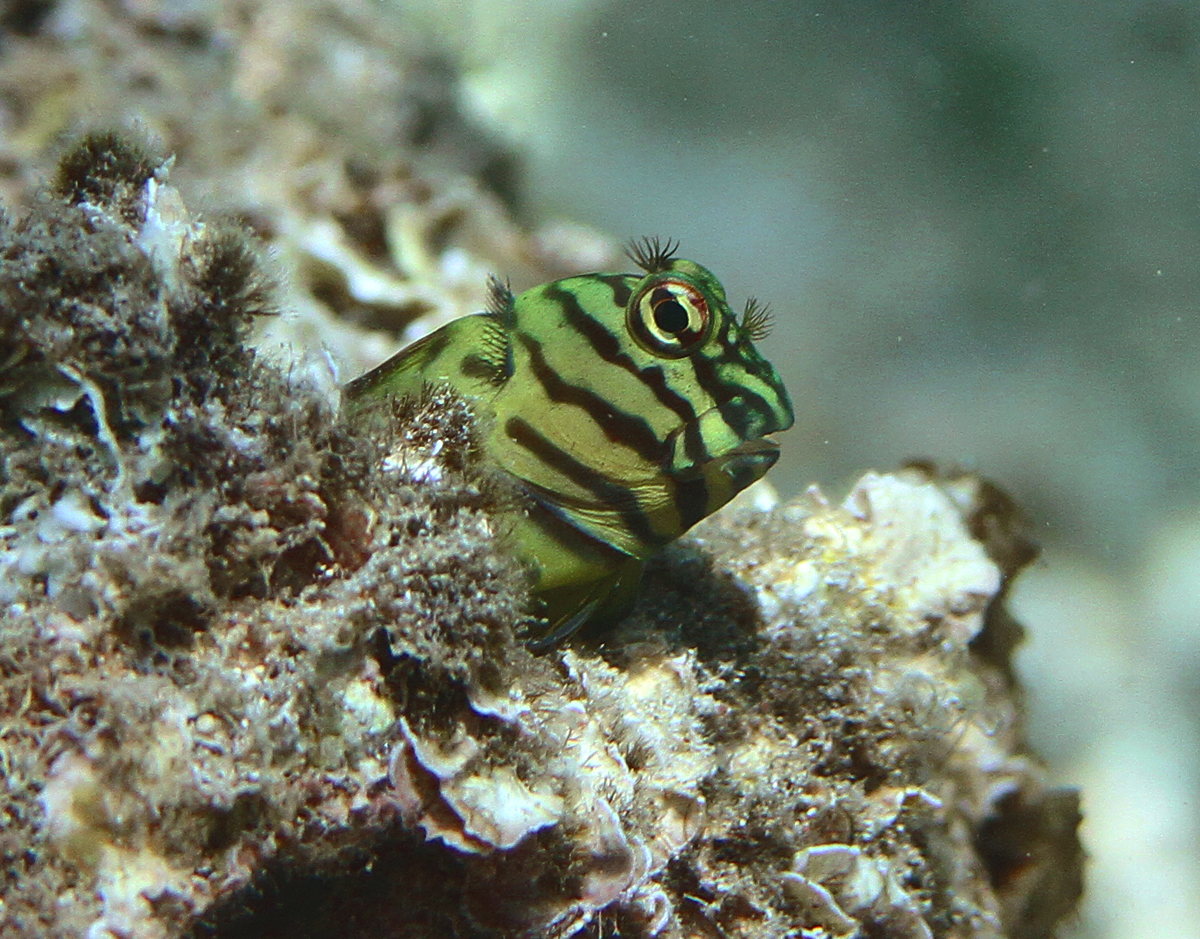

Conservation status
- Least Concern (IUCN 3.1)

Scientific classification
- Kingdom: Animalia
- Phylum: Chordata
- Class: Actinopterygii
- Order: Blenniiformes
- Family: Blenniidae
- Genus: Cirripectes
- Species: C. castaneus

Binomial name
- Cirripectes castaneus (Valenciennes, 1836)

Synonyms
- Salarias castaneus Valenciennes, 1836; Cirripectes reticulatus Fowler, 1946; Cirripectes gibbifrons J. L. B. Smith, 1947

= Cirripectes castaneus =

Species of fish

Cirripectes castaneus, the chestnut eyelash-blenny, is a species of combtooth blenny found in coral reefs in the western Pacific and Indian oceans. This species reaches a length of 12.5 centimetres (4.9 in) TL.
