= Scartella itajobi =

Conservation status
- Least Concern (IUCN 3.1)

Scientific classification
- Kingdom: Animalia
- Phylum: Chordata
- Class: Actinopterygii
- Order: Blenniiformes
- Family: Blenniidae
- Genus: Scartella
- Species: S. itajobi

Binomial name
- Scartella itajobi Rangel & L. F. Mendes, 2009

Species of fish

Scartella itajobi is a species of combtooth blenny found in the Atlantic ocean. This species reaches a length of 4.7 centimetres (1.9 in) SL.
