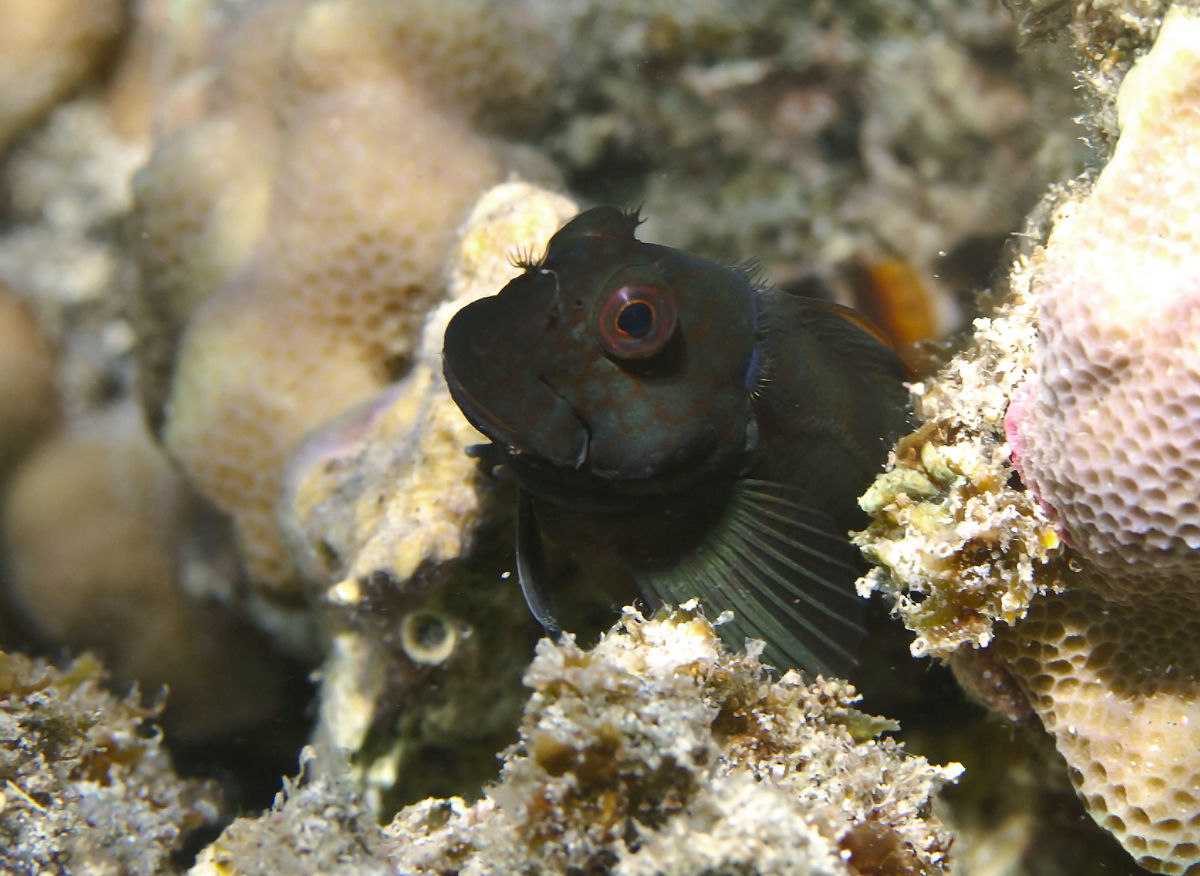

Conservation status
- Least Concern (IUCN 3.1)

Scientific classification
- Kingdom: Animalia
- Phylum: Chordata
- Class: Actinopterygii
- Division: Teleostei
- Order: Blenniiformes
- Family: Blenniidae
- Genus: Cirripectes
- Species: C. stigmaticus

Binomial name
- Cirripectes stigmaticus Strasburg & L. P. Schultz, 1953

= Cirripectes stigmaticus =

Species of fish

Cirripectes stigmaticus, the red-streaked blenny, is a species of combtooth blenny from the Indo-Pacific. It occasionally makes its way into the aquarium trade. This species reaches a length of 13 centimetres (5.1 in) TL.
