= Cirripectes jenningsi =

Conservation status
- Least Concern (IUCN 3.1)

Scientific classification
- Kingdom: Animalia
- Phylum: Chordata
- Class: Actinopterygii
- Order: Blenniiformes
- Family: Blenniidae
- Genus: Cirripectes
- Species: C. jenningsi

Binomial name
- Cirripectes jenningsi L. P. Schultz, 1943

Species of fish

Cirripectes jenningsi is a species of combtooth blenny found in the Pacific Ocean, from the Gilbert Islands to the Tuamotu Islands. This species reaches a length of 7.6 centimetres (3.0 in) SL. The specific name honours the Alexander Jennings who was the manager of Swains Island, one of the Phoenix Islands in American Samoa, where Schultz collected the type.
