= Cirripectes quagga =

Conservation status
- Least Concern (IUCN 3.1)

Scientific classification
- Kingdom: Animalia
- Phylum: Chordata
- Class: Actinopterygii
- Order: Blenniiformes
- Family: Blenniidae
- Genus: Cirripectes
- Species: C. quagga

Binomial name
- Cirripectes quagga (Fowler & Ball, 1924)

Species of fish

Cirripectes quagga, also known as the squiggly blenny or zebra blenny, is a species of combtooth blenny found in coral reefs in the Pacific and Indian oceans. This species reaches a length of 10 centimetres (3.9 in) TL.
