= Scartella poiti =

Conservation status
- Vulnerable (IUCN 3.1)

Scientific classification
- Kingdom: Animalia
- Phylum: Chordata
- Class: Actinopterygii
- Order: Blenniiformes
- Family: Blenniidae
- Genus: Scartella
- Species: S. poiti

Binomial name
- Scartella poiti Rangel, Gasparini & R. Z. P. Guimarães, 2004

Species of fish

Scartella poiti is a species of combtooth blenny found in coral reefs in the southwest Atlantic ocean, around Trindade Island, Brazil. This species reaches a length of 8.5 centimetres (3.3 in) SL. The specific name honours the Brazilian Navy's Posto Oceanográfico da Ilha da Trindade ("Oceanographic Post of Trindade Island"), in gratitude for their assistance to the authors on their trips to the island.
