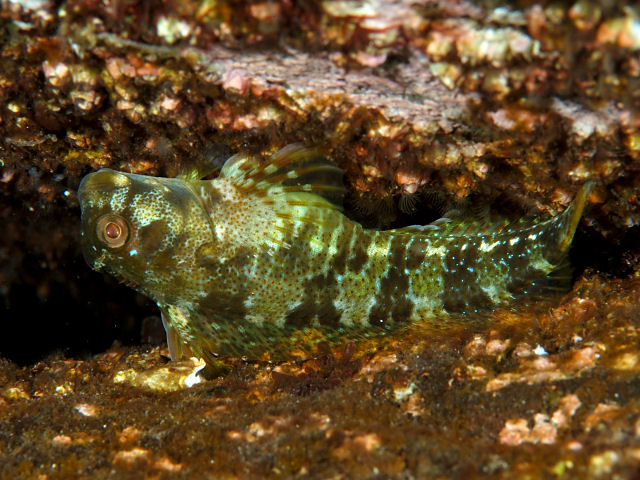

Conservation status
- Least Concern (IUCN 3.1)

Scientific classification
- Kingdom: Animalia
- Phylum: Chordata
- Class: Actinopterygii
- Order: Blenniiformes
- Family: Blenniidae
- Genus: Scartella
- Species: S. emarginata

Binomial name
- Scartella emarginata (Günther, 1861)

Synonyms
- Blennius emarginatus Günther, 1861; Blennius steindachneri Day, 1873

= Scartella emarginata =

Maned blenny

Species of fish

Scartella emarginata (maned blenny) is a species of combtooth blenny found in the Indian Ocean. This species reaches a length of 10 centimetres (3.9 in) SL.
