= Scartella springeri =

Conservation status
- Vulnerable (IUCN 3.1)

Scientific classification
- Kingdom: Animalia
- Phylum: Chordata
- Class: Actinopterygii
- Order: Blenniiformes
- Family: Blenniidae
- Genus: Scartella
- Species: S. springeri

Binomial name
- Scartella springeri (Bauchot, 1967)

Species of fish

Scartella springeri (Springer's blenny) is a species of combtooth blenny found in the eastern Atlantic Ocean, around St. Helena. This species reaches a length of 8.2 centimetres (3.2 in) SL. The specific name honours the American ichthyologist Victor G. Springer of the U.S. National Museum.
