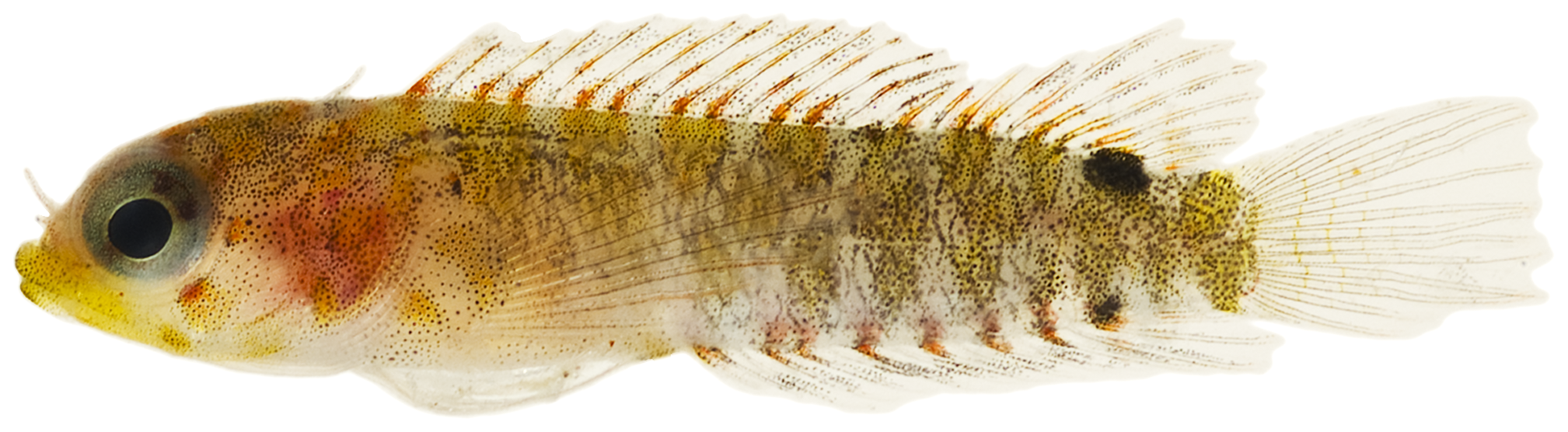
- Juvenile
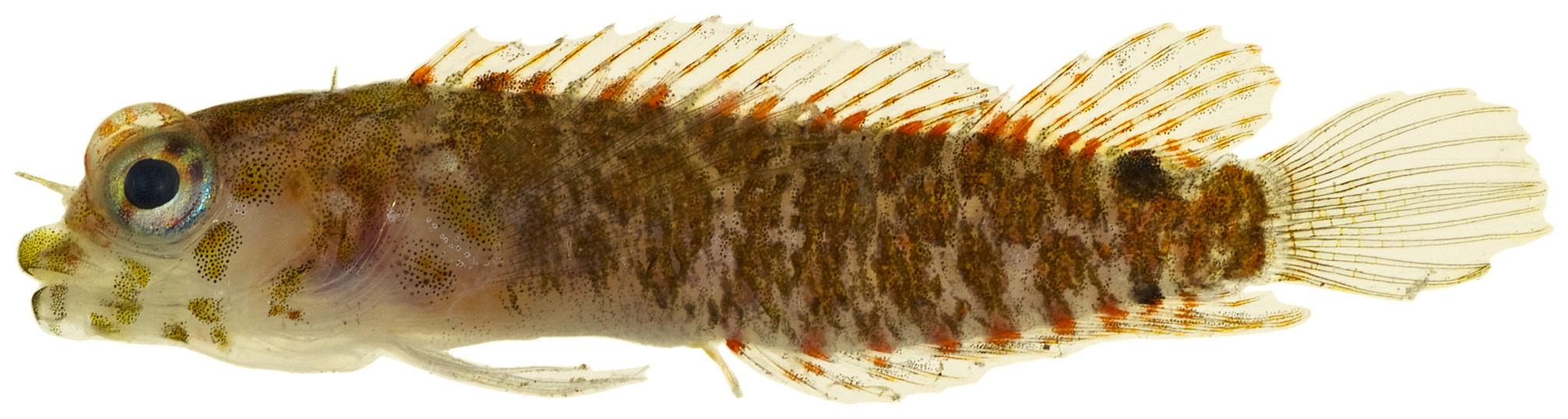
- Adult male

Conservation status
- Least Concern (IUCN 3.1)

Scientific classification
- Kingdom: Animalia
- Phylum: Chordata
- Class: Actinopterygii
- Order: Blenniiformes
- Family: Labrisomidae
- Genus: Starksia
- Species: S. atlantica

Binomial name
- Starksia atlantica Longley, 1934
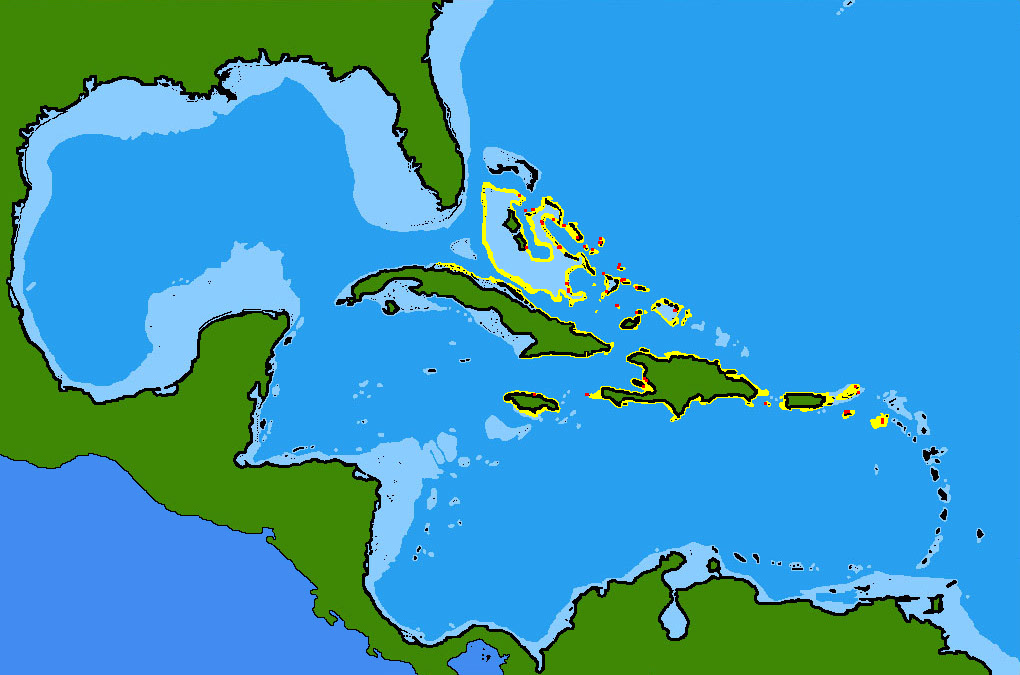

= Starksia atlantica =

Species of fish

Starksia atlantica, the smooth-eye blenny, is a species of labrisomid blenny native to the western central Atlantic Ocean and the Caribbean Sea where it inhabits coral reefs at depths of around 8 metres (26 ft).

== Description ==
Adult Starksia atlantica can grow to 2.5 cm (0.98 in) in length. It is an elongated shape with a continuous short dorsal fin running most of the length of the body. The colour is variable, being mostly mottled brown on a silvery background with larger dark spots above. The dorsal fin has 18–19 rays, the anal fin 7–8 rays, the pelvic fins have 15–16 and the pectorals 14 rays.

Early-stage larvae of Starksia are more tadpole-shaped than other labrisomids and lack some of the melanophores (dark spots) typical of the family. Juvenile Starksia atlantica are long and narrow, with large eyes. The mouth is at the tip of the pointed snout. Both the dorsal and anal fins run continuously for most of the length of the body. The pectoral fins are long and the pelvic fins have 2 spines and are long and threadlike. The melanophores are few in number and occur at the base of the anal fin rays.

== Phylogeny ==
Starksia atlantica has five distinct lineages of varied geographic distribution. Barbados (BAR) and Panama (PAN) lineages are identified by COI sequencing divergence. Curaçao (CUR), Saba Bank (SAB), and Bahamas/Turks and Caicos/Belize (BAH/ TCI/BLZ) lineages lack an orbital cirrus.
