= Cirripectes variolosus =

Conservation status
- Least Concern (IUCN 3.1)

Scientific classification
- Kingdom: Animalia
- Phylum: Chordata
- Class: Actinopterygii
- Order: Blenniiformes
- Family: Blenniidae
- Genus: Cirripectes
- Species: C. variolosus

Binomial name
- Cirripectes variolosus (Valenciennes, 1836)

Synonyms
- Salarias variolosus Valenciennes, 1836; Istiblennius variolosus (Valenciennes, 1836); Salarias sebae Valenciennes, 1836; Cirripectes sebae (Valenciennes, 1836); Salarias nigripes Seale, 1901; Ophioblennius clarki Reid, 1943

Species of fish

Cirripectes variolosus, the red-speckled blenny, is a species of combtooth blenny found in coral reefs in the Pacific Ocean. This species reaches a length of 10 centimetres (3.9 in) TL.
