= Jeffrey T. Williams =

American scientist (ichthyologist)

Jeffery T. Williams is an American ichthyologist. He is primarily interested in the systematics, taxonomy, and zoogeography of marine fishes. He is the retired Collections Manager in the Division of Fishes at the National Museum of Natural History of the Smithsonian Institution.

== Education ==
- B.S. Biology, Florida State University, 1975
- M.S. Biology, University of South Alabama, 1979
- Ph.D. Zoology, University of Florida, 1986

== See also ==
- Category:Taxa named by Jeffrey T. Williams
