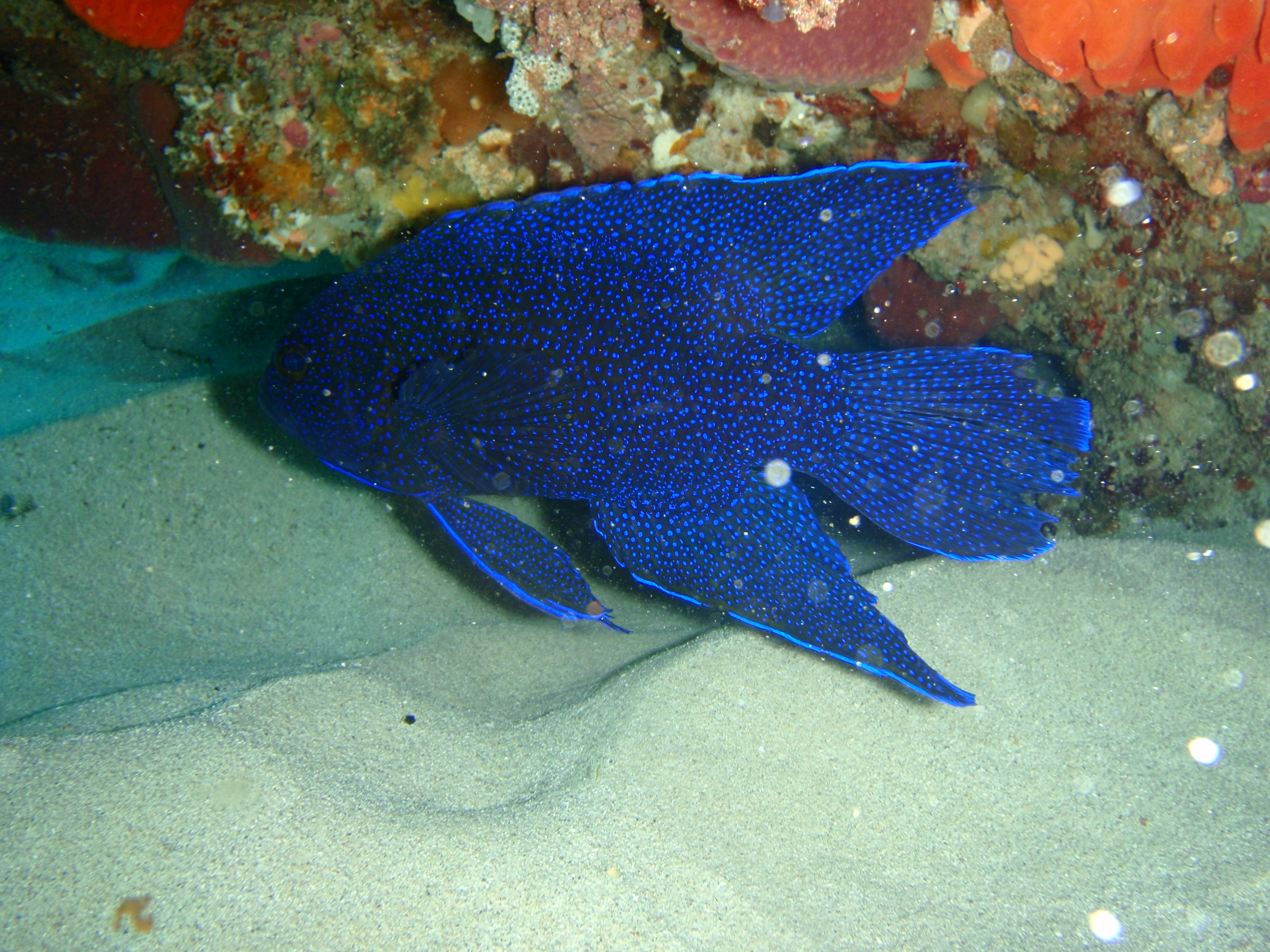

Conservation status
- Least Concern (IUCN 3.1)

Scientific classification
- Kingdom: Animalia
- Phylum: Chordata
- Class: Actinopterygii
- Order: Blenniiformes
- Family: Plesiopidae
- Genus: Paraplesiops
- Species: P. meleagris

Binomial name
- Paraplesiops meleagris (Peters, 1869)

Synonyms
- Plesiops meleagris Peters, 1869; Ruppelia prolongata Castelnau, 1873; Bleeckeria catafracta Castelnau, 1873; Plesiops gigas Steindachner, 1883

= Southern blue devil =

Species of fish

The southern blue devil (Paraplesiops meleagris) is a species of ray-finned fish in the longfin family Plesiopidae. Endemic to southern Australia, it is a close relative of the eastern blue devil (P. bleekeri), which lives in coastal waters of eastern Australia, and of the western blue devil (P. sinclairi) of southwestern Western Australia.

== Description ==
The southern blue devil grows to about 33 cm in length. The body is dark blue to bluish-grey and densely covered in brighter blue spots, and the dorsal, pelvic, anal and pelvic fins have a pale blue margin. The dorsal, anal and pelvic fins are relatively large.

== Distribution and habitat ==
The southern blue devil is found along the southern Australian coastline, from South Australia to eastern Victoria. It occupies reefs, ledges, crevices, and deep cave systems, at depths ranging from 3 to over 40 m, sometimes in small groups containing individuals of sizes varying from small juveniles to mature adults.

== Behavior ==
=== Breeding ===
Eggs are laid on a substrate and are guarded by the male until they hatch.

=== Feeding ===
This species feeds on small fish, crabs and gastropods.
