= Assessor randalli =

Scientific classification
- Kingdom: Animalia
- Phylum: Chordata
- Class: Actinopterygii
- Order: Blenniiformes
- Family: Plesiopidae
- Genus: Assessor
- Species: A. randalli

Binomial name
- Assessor randalli Allen & Kuiter, 1976

Species of fish

Assessor randalli, Randall's assessor or Randall's devilfish, is a species of ray-finned fish belonging to the family Plesiopidae, the longfins or roundheads. It is found in the western Pacific Ocean, mainly in the seas around Japan and Taiwan. It is a similar species to Assessor macneilli but it is slightly brighter in colour and has more rounded rounder fins which have with yellow markings, there are also yellow markings on its body. They are associated with crevices and gullies in reefs, where they hover at the entrances to caves and holes. They are mouthbrooders, the male guards the eggs by keeping them in his mouth until they hatch. They are rare in the Aquarium trade but have been bred in captivity.

== Etymology ==
The specific name honours the ichthyologist John Ernest Randall of the Bishop Museum in Honolulu, who collected the type specimen.
