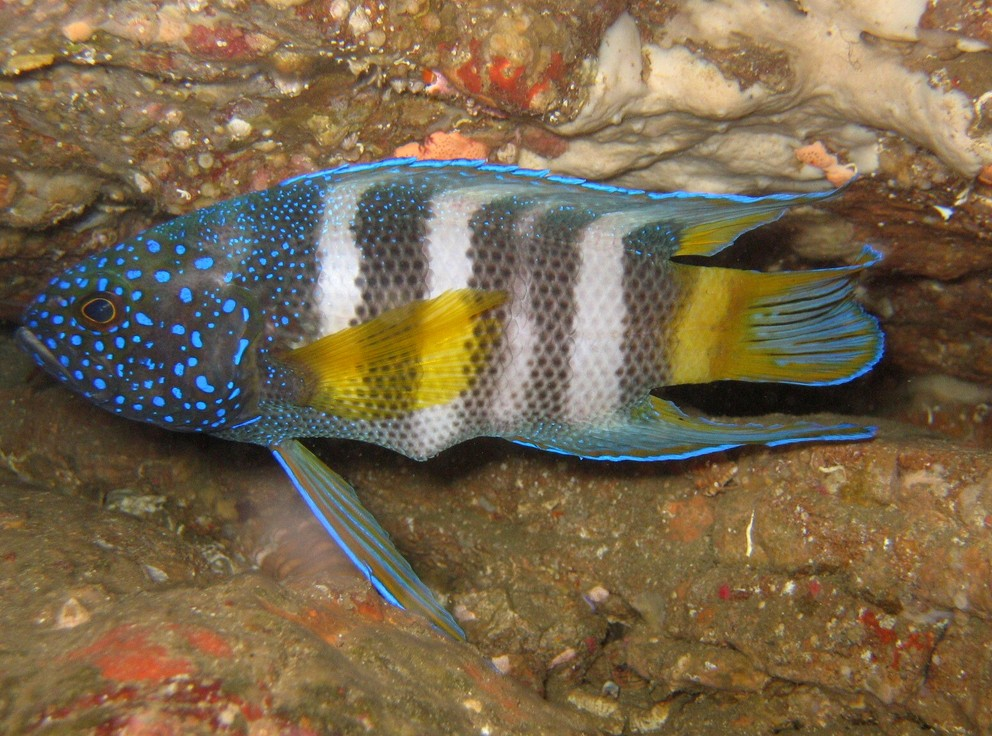
- Paraplesiops bleekeri

Scientific classification
- Domain: Eukaryota
- Kingdom: Animalia
- Phylum: Chordata
- Class: Actinopterygii
- Order: Blenniiformes
- Family: Plesiopidae
- Subfamily: Plesiopinae
- Genus: Paraplesiops; Bleeker, 1875

Type species
- Plesiops bleekeri Günther, 1861

Synonyms
- Bleeckeria Castelnau, 1873; Ruppelia Castelnau, 1873; Acanthogonia Ogilby, 1918

= Paraplesiops =

Genus of fishes

Paraplesiops is a genus containing five largely allopatric species of fishes in the longfin, or roundhead, family Plesiopidae, commonly known as blue devils, bluedevils, or blue devilfish because of their colouration. The genus is most similar to the tropical genera Plesiops and Fraudella. It is restricted to subtropical and temperate rocky and coral reefs in Australian waters. Its species are mostly cryptic, occurring in submarine caves, crevices and under rocky ledges.

Paraplesiops often hide unless food is available, they are very friendly fish unless around their prey. They eat small fish or crustaceans.

== Species ==
There are five recognized species:

- Paraplesiops alisonae Hoese and Kuiter, 1984 – Alison's blue devil
- Paraplesiops bleekeri (Günther, 1861) – eastern blue devil
- Paraplesiops meleagris (Peters, 1869) – southern blue devil
- Paraplesiops poweri Ogilby, 1908 – northern blue devil
- Paraplesiops sinclairi Hutchins, 1987 – western blue devil
