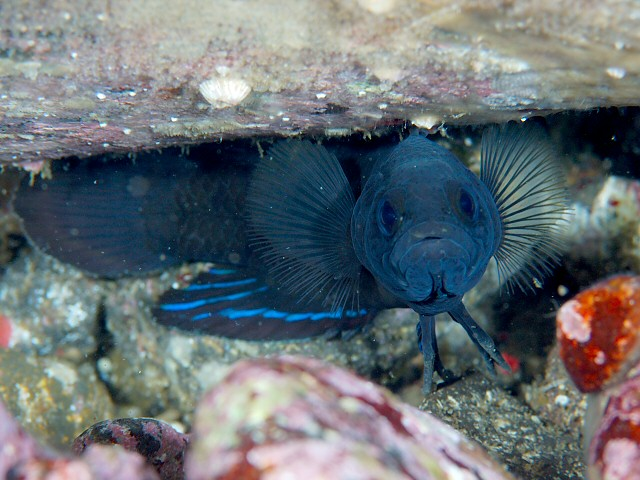
- Plesiops coeruleolineatus
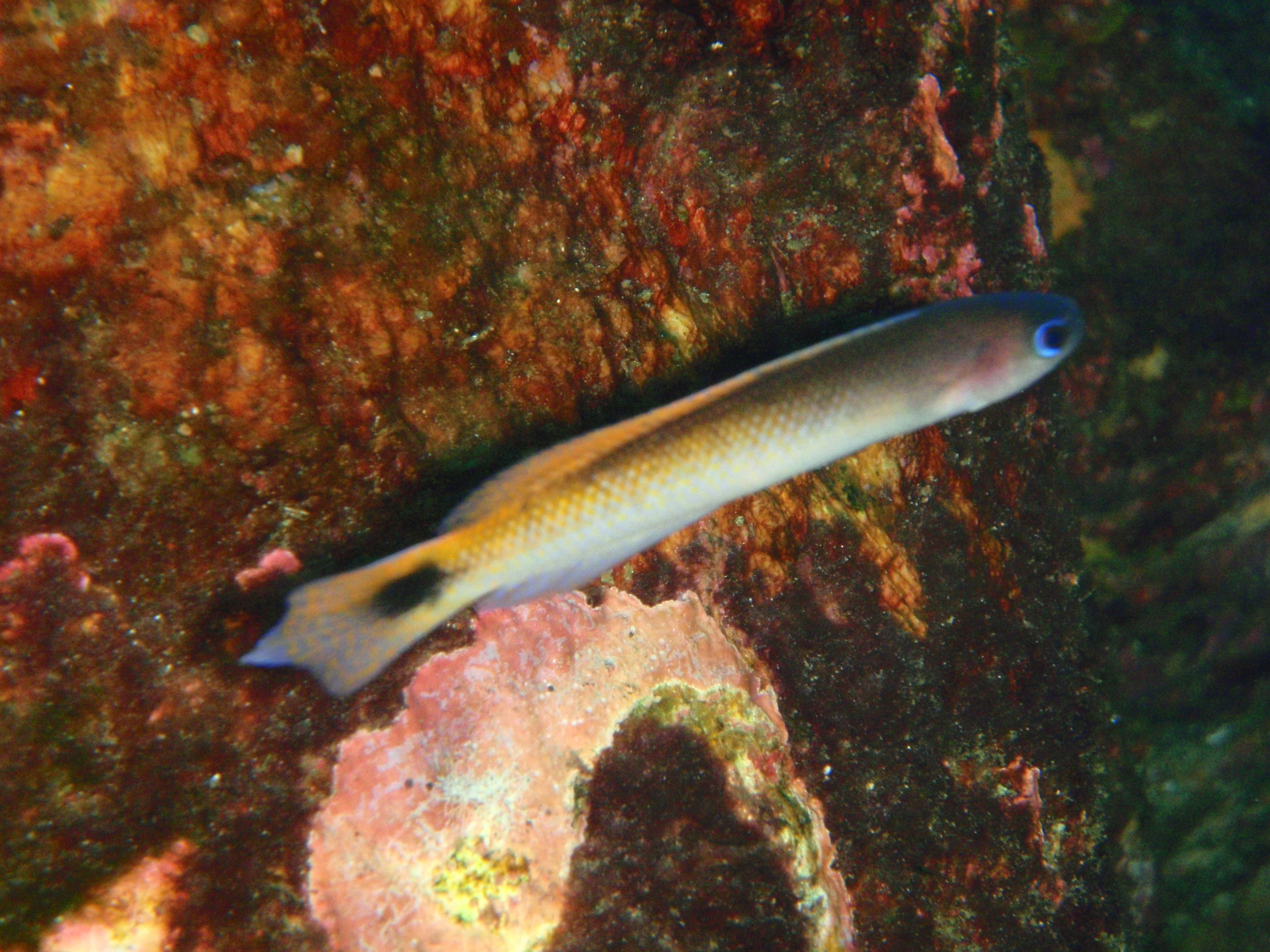
- Trachinops caudimaculatus

Scientific classification
- Kingdom: Animalia
- Phylum: Chordata
- Class: Actinopterygii
- Clade: Ovalentaria
- Order: Blenniiformes
- Family: Plesiopidae
- Subfamily: Plesiopinae; Günther, 1861

= Plesiopinae =

Subfamily of fishes

Plesiopinae is one of two subfamilies in the family Plesiopidae, the longfins or roundheads.

== Characteristics ==
The fish in the subfamily Plesiopinae are relatively small fish, growing to a maximum length of 20 centimetres (7.9 in). They have scales on the gill covers and these frequently extend to the top of their heads. The dorsal fin has between 11 and 15 spines and 6 and 21 soft rays, the anal fin has 3 spines and between 7 and 23 soft rayes while the pelvic fin has a single spine and 4 soft rays.

== Genera ==
The following gerbera are classified under the Plesiopinae:

- Assessor Whitley, 1935
- Calloplesiops Fowler & B.A. Bean, 1930
- Fraudella Whitley, 1935
- Paraplesiops Bleeker, 1875
- Plesiops Oken, 1817
- Steeneichthys Allen & Randall, 1985
- Trachinops Günther, 1861
