= Sanko Harvest =

Bulk carrier that sank off Esperance, Western Australia

History
- Owner: Seawall Shipping Corporation
- Operator: Sanko Steamship Co
- Port of registry: Panama
- Builder: Mitsubishi Heavy Industries Ltd
- Launched: 1985
- Identification: Official Number 8307521
- Fate: Struck a reef and sank 14 February 1991

General characteristics
- Tonnage: 32,502 DWT
- Length: 167.6 m (550 ft)
- Beam: 27 m (89 ft)
- Draft: 14.8 m (49 ft)

Sanko Harvest was a 32,502 DWT dry bulk carrier that sank off Esperance, Western Australia after striking a charted reef on 14 February 1991. The Korean-crewed Japanese-owned ship was 174 metres (571 ft) long and was carrying a cargo of 32,790 tonnes (72 million pounds) of phosphate fertilizer valued at A$8.9 million, equivalent to A$19.1 million in 2022. Also on board were 677 tonnes (1.5 million pounds) of heavy bunker fuel and 40 tonnes (88,000 lb) of light diesel oil.

The wreck site is the second largest wreck dive in the world and the largest off the Australian coast.

== Sinking ==
Sanko Harvest had loaded a bulk cargo of phosphate fertilizer from Florida's Bone Valley mines, at Tampa, Florida and was traveling via the Panama Canal to Esperance when it hit a charted reef at 34°7′21″S 122°4′53″E, near Hood Island within the Recherche Archipelago, 33 kilometres (21 mi) southeast of Esperance.

Initially, salvage plans were put in place, however the ship started to break up and broke into three pieces and sank on the night of 17 and 18 February. During the break up, all of the highly soluble fertilizer cargo, and the bunker and diesel fuel oils were released into the sea. Most of the fuel oils washed onto the beaches of nearby Cape Le Grand National Park. Two colonies of New Zealand Fur seal pups were oiled by the slick. A CALM rescue operation was able to clean and save over 80% of the oiled seal pups. There were 20 reported bird deaths and no reported fish deaths. 200 drums of chemical dispersant were used in the clean-up operation.

The subsequent investigation by the Australian Transport Safety Bureau found the grounding to be the fault of the Master and Second Officer of the ship, in navigating an area where acceptable hydrographic surveys were incomplete, and in failure to correct the ship's charts of the area, in particular with a 1988 Admiralty notice that described the geographical location of the reef.

== Dive site ==
The wreck rests in 40 metres (130 ft) of water, with the highest points accessible 13 metres (43 ft) from the surface. It is considered an advanced dive, containing enclosed spaces and potential hazards such as sharp metal debris. The wreck has had a 500-metre (1,600 ft) radius no-take fishing exclusion zone around it since 1995, which, along with its remoteness, has protected its habitat value. Fish living on and around the wreck include: western blue groper, queen snapper, Australasian snapper, harlequin fish, Port Jackson sharks and the western blue devil. Kelp, macroalgae, sponges, soft and stony corals, sea tulips and sea stars live on the wreck. The wreck is visited by seals, dolphins and the occasional humpback whale.
