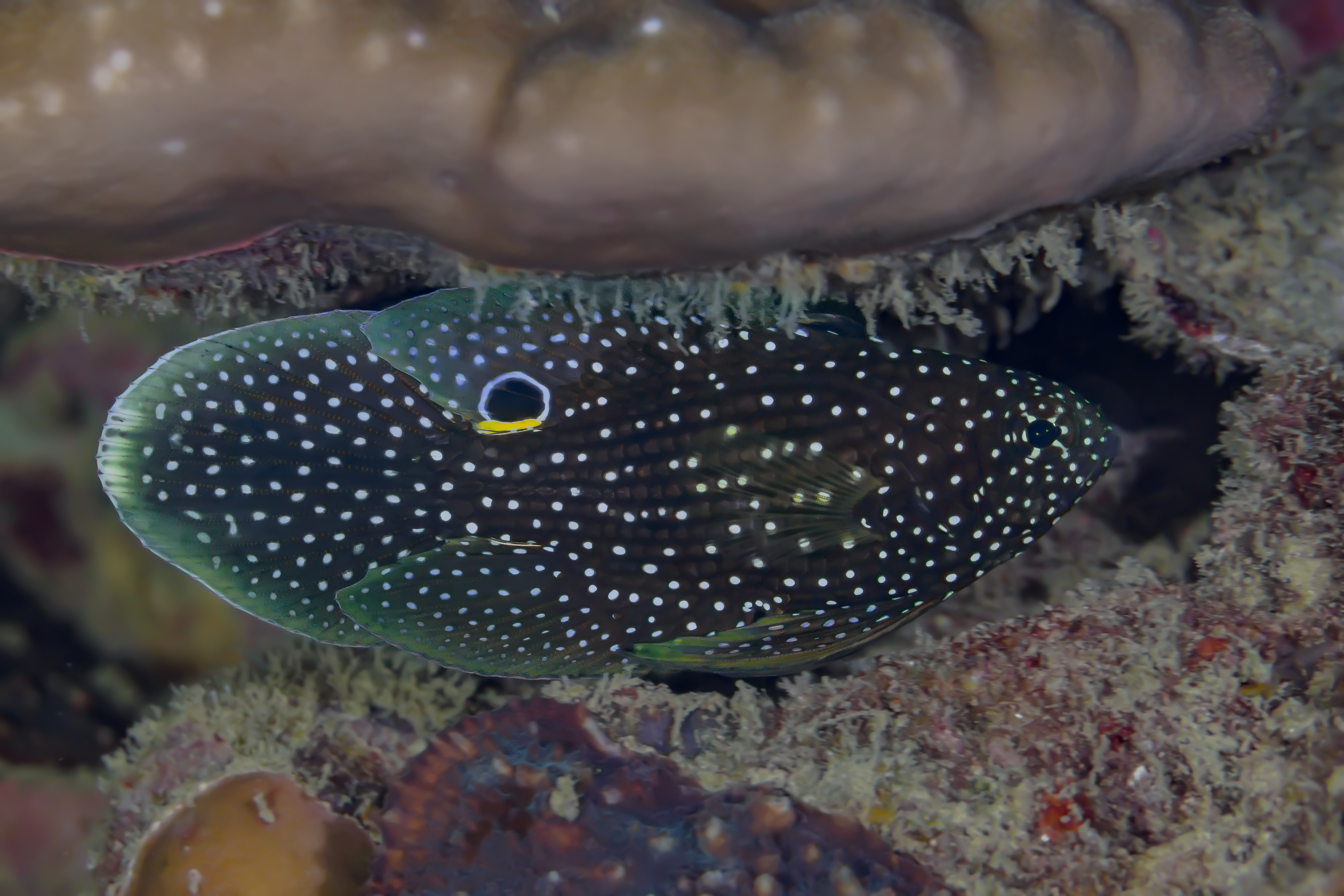

Conservation status
- Least Concern (IUCN 3.1)

Scientific classification
- Kingdom: Animalia
- Phylum: Chordata
- Class: Actinopterygii
- Order: Blenniiformes
- Family: Plesiopidae
- Genus: Calloplesiops
- Species: C. altivelis

Binomial name
- Calloplesiops altivelis Steindachner, 1903

Synonyms
- Plesiops altivelis Steindachner, 1903; Barrosia barrosi J. L. B. Smith, 1952

= Comet (fish) =

Species of fish

The comet or marine betta (Calloplesiops altivelis) is a species of reef-associated tropical marine fish in the longfin family Plesiopidae, most commonly found between 3 and 50 m deep. It is native to the Indo-Pacific Ocean. It can reach a maximum length of 20 cm.

== Behaviour ==
Adults are usually found near reefs, and in caves and crevices along drop-offs. The comet is nocturnal by nature, and will hide under ledges and in holes by day. During night time, it leaves its hiding place and swims along the reef searching for food. They possess an eye-like shape which is actually the dorsal fin. When in danger, this fish will poke its head into a hole and expose its tail end, which mimics the head of the moray eel.

== Feeding ==
Comets are predators, feeding on crustaceans and small fish. They catch their prey by approaching it swimming sideways and then waiting for the prey to try to escape. As the prey tries to escape on the side of the fish, it will escape towards the fish's mouth half the time.

== In the aquarium ==
Comets are known to be difficult to feed in captivity, as they will generally only accept live foods. Moreover, they require time to stalk their prey. Therefore, if they are in an aquarium with other predatory fish (e.g. lionfish and groupers), they might starve, as they are not fast enough to get a good share of the food. Comets have been successfully bred in captivity.
