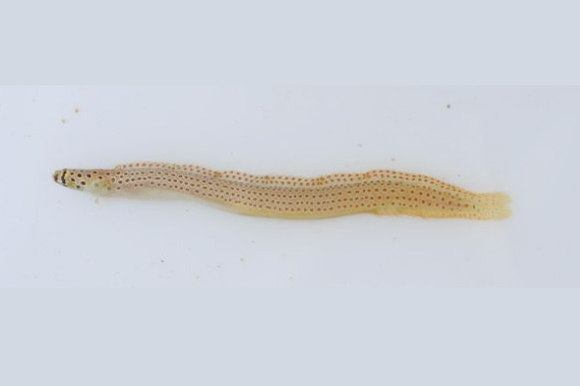
- Notograptus guttatus

Scientific classification
- Domain: Eukaryota
- Kingdom: Animalia
- Phylum: Chordata
- Class: Actinopterygii
- Order: Blenniiformes
- Family: Plesiopidae
- Subfamily: Acanthoclininae
- Genus: Notograptus; Günther, 1867

Type species
- Notograptus guttatus Günther, 1867

= Notograptus =

Genus of fishes

Notograptus is a genus of marine fish in subclass Actinopterygii and order Perciformes. They are sometimes placed in the monotypic family Notograptidae, or may instead be included in the family Plesiopidae. Notograptus supposedly bears a relationship with Acanthoplesiops.

Notograptus contains these species:

- Notograptus gregoryi Whitley, 1941 (Shark-tailed eel blenny)
- Notograptus guttatus Günther, 1867 (Spotted eel blenny)
