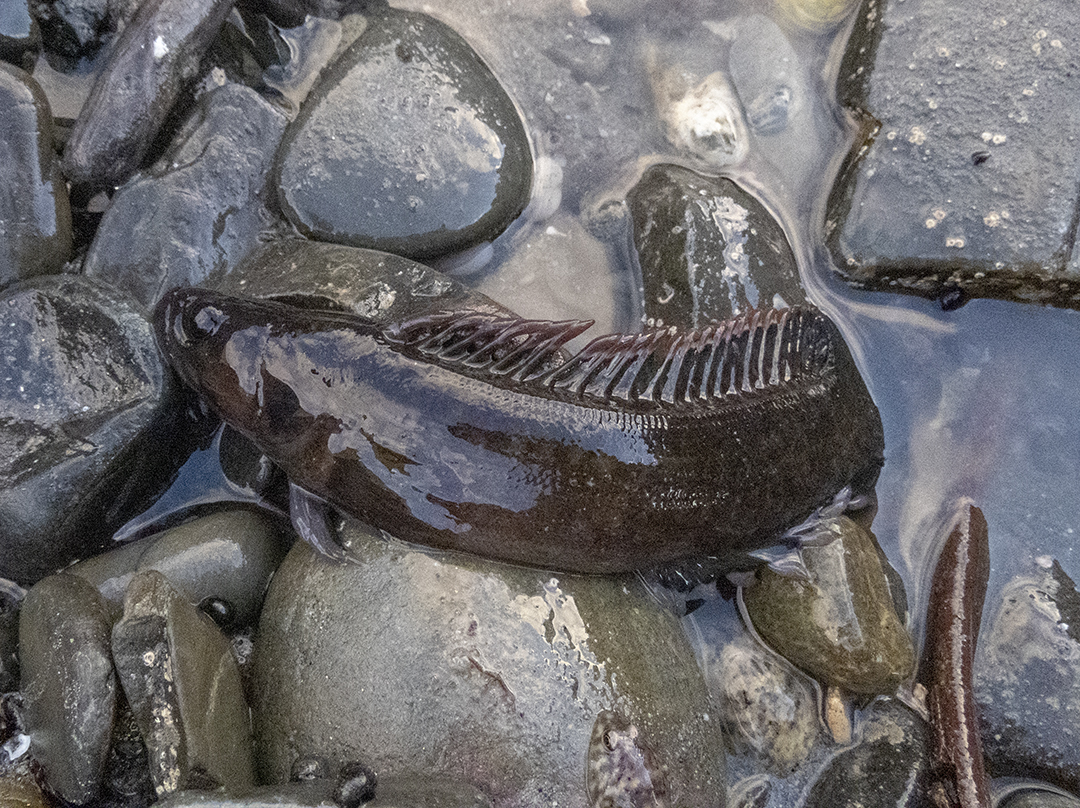

Scientific classification
- Kingdom: Animalia
- Phylum: Chordata
- Class: Actinopterygii
- Order: Blenniiformes
- Family: Plesiopidae
- Genus: Acanthoclinus
- Species: A. marilynae

Binomial name
- Acanthoclinus marilynae (Hardy, 1985)

Synonyms
- Taumakoides marilynae Hardy, 1985

= Stout rockfish =

Species of fish

The stout rockfish (Acanthoclinus marilynae) is a longfin of the family Plesiopidae, found only in New Zealand's subtidal zone and in rock pools at low tide. Their length is up to 17 cm. The specific name honours Hardy's wife, Marilyn.
