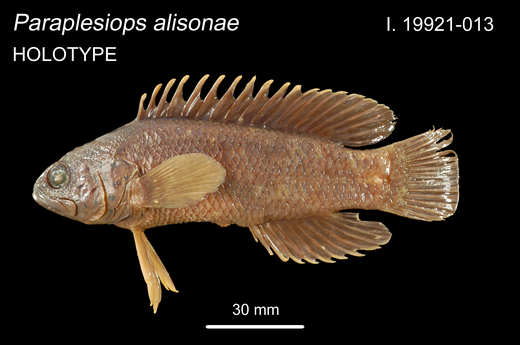
- Holotype of P. alisonae

Scientific classification
- Kingdom: Animalia
- Phylum: Chordata
- Class: Actinopterygii
- Order: Blenniiformes
- Family: Plesiopidae
- Genus: Paraplesiops
- Species: P. alisonae

Binomial name
- Paraplesiops alisonae Hoese & Kuiter, 1984

= Alison's blue devil =

Species of fish

Alison's blue devil (Paraplesiops alisonae) is a species of fish in the longfin family Plesiopidae. It was described in 1984 and named for Alison Kuiter, the wife of Rudie Kuiter, because he said she saw the species first. It has a brown head and body with iridescent blue spots on the head. It has been recorded from various sites in southern Australian waters, including Port Phillip in Victoria, northern Tasmania and Tasmanian islands in Bass Strait, Kangaroo Island, and Victor Harbor in South Australia.
