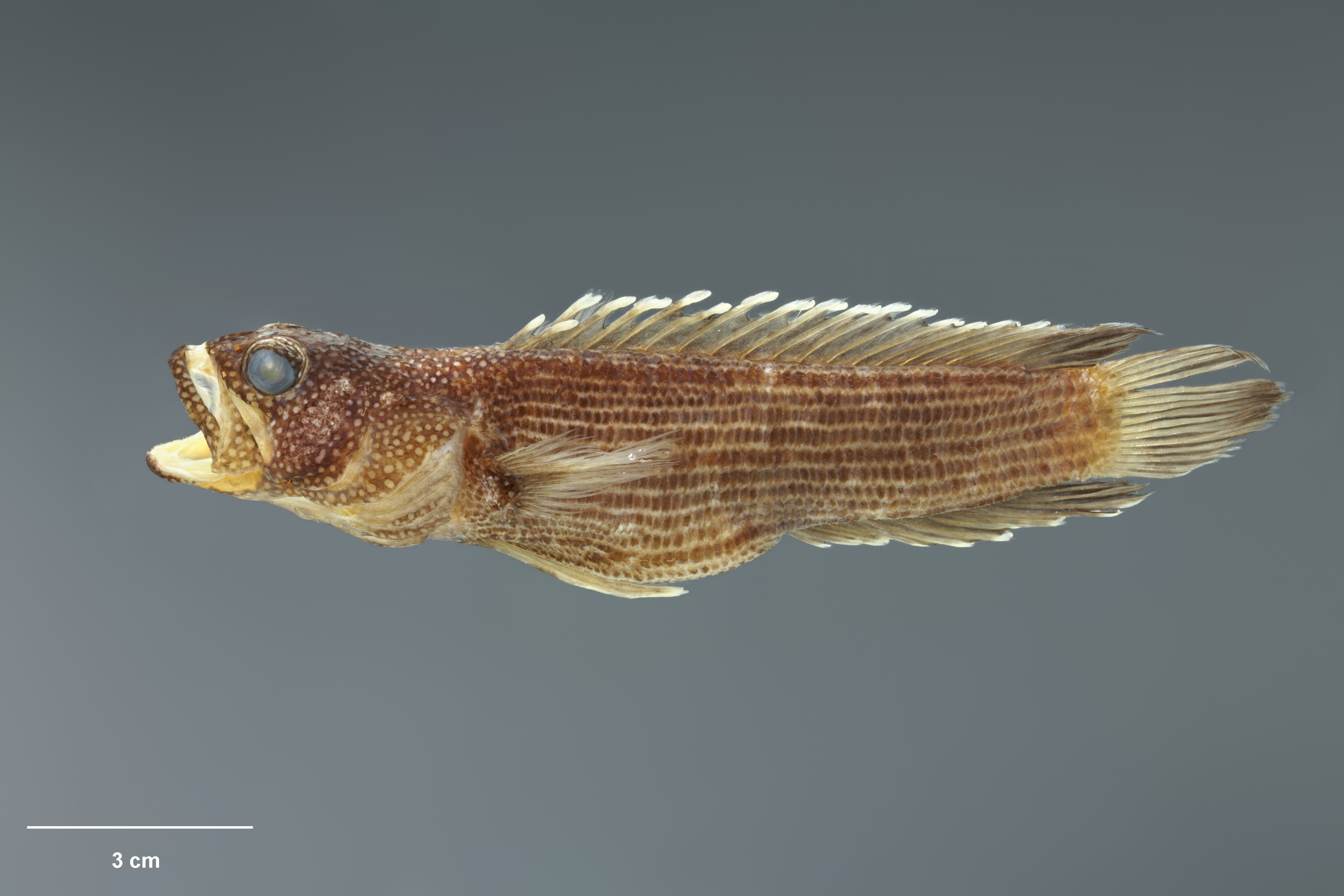
- Type specimen from Te Papa Tongarewa collections

Scientific classification
- Kingdom: Animalia
- Phylum: Chordata
- Class: Actinopterygii
- Order: Blenniiformes
- Family: Plesiopidae
- Genus: Acanthoclinus
- Species: A. matti

Binomial name
- Acanthoclinus matti (Hardy, 1985)

Synonyms
- Taumakoides matti Hardy, 1985

= Acanthoclinus matti =

Species of fish

Acanthoclinus matti is a longfin of the family Plesiopidae, found only in New Zealand at depths down to 17 m. The specific name honours Hardy's son, Matthew.
