= Northern blue devil =

Conservation status
- Least Concern (IUCN 3.1)

Scientific classification
- Kingdom: Animalia
- Phylum: Chordata
- Class: Actinopterygii
- Order: Blenniiformes
- Family: Plesiopidae
- Genus: Paraplesiops
- Species: P. poweri

Binomial name
- Paraplesiops poweri Ogilby, 1908

Synonyms
- Paraplesiops jolliffei Ogilby, 1916

Species of fish

The northern blue devil (Paraplesiops poweri) is a species of fish in the longfin family Plesiopidae. It has been recorded from the inshore waters of Queensland, eastern Australia, from Bowen to Moreton Bay. The specific name honours Percy Power, who caught the type specimen.
