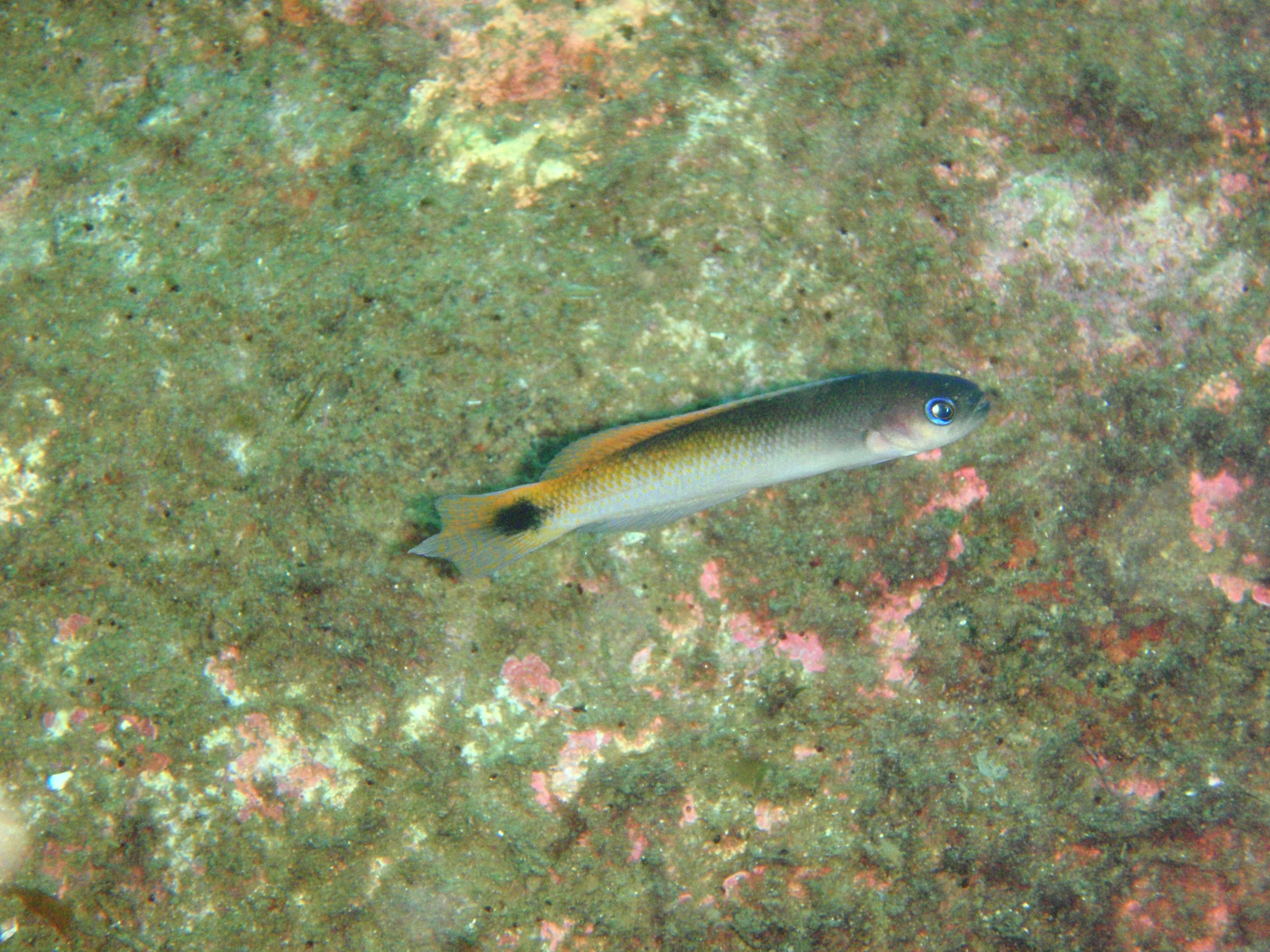

Scientific classification
- Kingdom: Animalia
- Phylum: Chordata
- Class: Actinopterygii
- Order: Blenniiformes
- Family: Plesiopidae
- Genus: Trachinops
- Species: T. caudimaculatus

Binomial name
- Trachinops caudimaculatus McCoy, 1890

Synonyms
- Pseudochromis rodwayi Johnston, 1902

= Southern hulafish =

Species of marine fish

The southern hulafish (Trachinops caudimaculatus) is a species of zooplanktivorous marine fish native to the temperate southern coast of Australia.

== Etymology ==
The scientific name Trachinops caudimaculatus refers to the fish's physical shape and pattern, with the genus name Trachinops translating to "rough appearance" and caudimaculatus meaning "spotted tail". This refers to the distinctive dark blotch at the base of the fish's tail which can be used for quick and reliable identification.

Like all Trachinops species, T. caudimaculatus swims with an unusually exaggerated undulating pattern; the common name "hulafish" is a reference to this behavior's superficial resemblance to the hula dance.

== Physical description ==
The southern hulafish is a small ray-finned fish, reaching up to 15 cm in length. The body is long and slender in shape, extended along the rostral-caudal axis but laterally and dorsoventrally narrow. Like that of other hulafish, its tail is lanceolate or leaf-like in shape, with elongated central fin rays relative to those more dorsal and ventral. Color varies between individuals, though the dorsal half of the head and body is typically grey, the ventral side a cool-toned tan, and the paired fins transparent and colorless. The southern hulafish can be distinguished readily from other similarly-sized and shaped members of its genus by the prominent black spot found at the base of its caudal fin and its darkened central fin rays.

== Distribution and habitat ==
T. caudimaculatus live in temperate nearshore reefs off the coast of southern Australia, particularly in the waters surrounding Victoria, South Australia, and Tasmania and as far west as the Great Australian Bight. This species is frequently found on small, rocky patches of reef in environments otherwise dominated by soft sediments. They prefer to live in large, dense shoals consisting of hundreds or thousands of individuals, though groups as small as 20 have been recorded. Though they may disperse far from their hatch site as larvae, adult southern hulafish are extremely unlikely to ever leave their home reef after settling and have never been recorded traveling through more than 20 meters of open water.

== Life history and behavior ==
Southern hulafish are short-lived, with an average lifespan between 1 and 5 years in the wild. They are specialist predators of zooplankton, especially copepods. Because they do not migrate as adults, shoals of hulafish are only found in reefs with substantial copepod populations. Hunting for copepods typically takes place at night, when the nocturnal hulafish is most active.

Eggs are laid in rocky crevices in hook- or anchor-shaped clusters and are guarded by the male parent against predators until they hatch. After spawning in the spring, larvae live as plankton for up to 1.5 months before settling on rocky reefs in December and January. Larvae and juveniles typically shoal together separate from adult hulafish for the following 3 months, after which they are fully grown and both visually and behaviorally indistinguishable from older adults.

Prior to settlement, the planktonic larvae have the potential for two different dispersal patterns dependent on their size and growth rate phenotypes. Typically, larger, faster-growing individuals occupy benthic environments at depths of up to 10 meters and do not travel far from their hatch site; conversely, smaller, slow-growing individuals live closer to the surface of the water and have the potential to disperse over long distances. This bifurcated pattern of retention and dispersal is likely an adaptation to balance the risks and rewards of both strategies, where dispersal brings the opportunity to monopolize potential resources but also higher risk of predation, while staying close to the hatch site ensures a secure habitat but with more competition from conspecifics.

When selecting a habitat in which to settle, young southern hulafish are drawn to habitats already home to adult conspecifics. This propensity to shoal seems to be an adaptive trait as it encourages settlement in areas where adult survival and longevity is likely. In the absence of adult conspecifics, T. caudimaculatus juveniles are more likely to settle in areas of dense macroalgae growth than on their more typical rocky reefs, a decision that ultimately leads to high mortality rates as such habitats provide effective camouflage for their predators.
