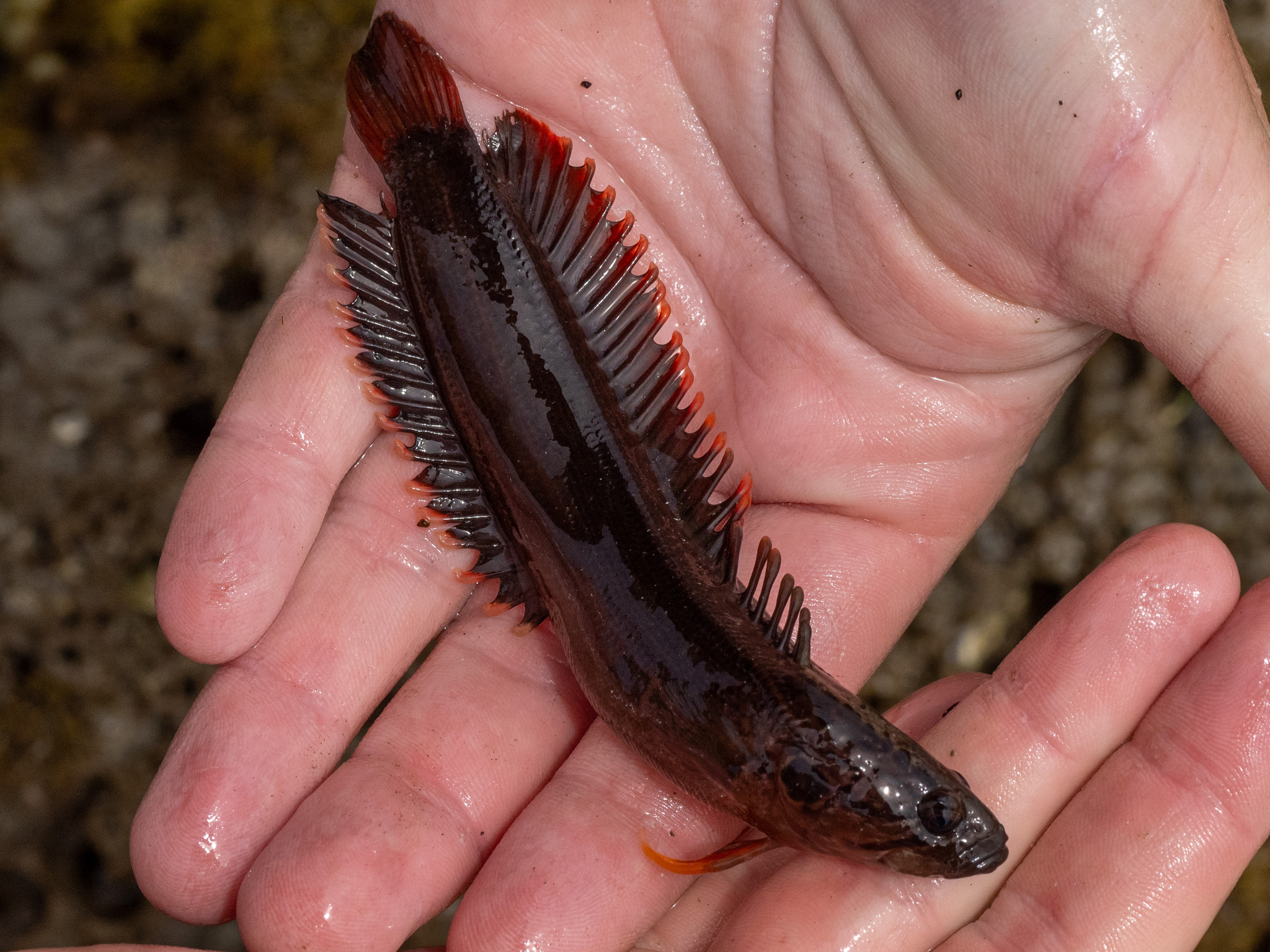
- A New Zealand rockfish found near Kaikōura

Scientific classification
- Kingdom: Animalia
- Phylum: Chordata
- Class: Actinopterygii
- Division: Teleostei
- Order: Blenniiformes
- Family: Plesiopidae
- Genus: Acanthoclinus
- Species: A. littoreus

Binomial name
- Acanthoclinus littoreus (Forster, 1801)

Synonyms
- Acanthoclinus quadridactylus (Bloch & Schneider, 1801); Blennius littoreus Forster, 1801; Blennius quadridactylus Bloch & Schneider, 1801; Taumakoides littoreus (Forster, 1801)

= New Zealand rockfish =

Species of fish

The New Zealand rockfish (Acanthoclinus littoreus) is a roundhead of the genus Acanthoclinus, found only in New Zealand from shallow depths to 15 m. Their length is between 5 and 15 cm.
