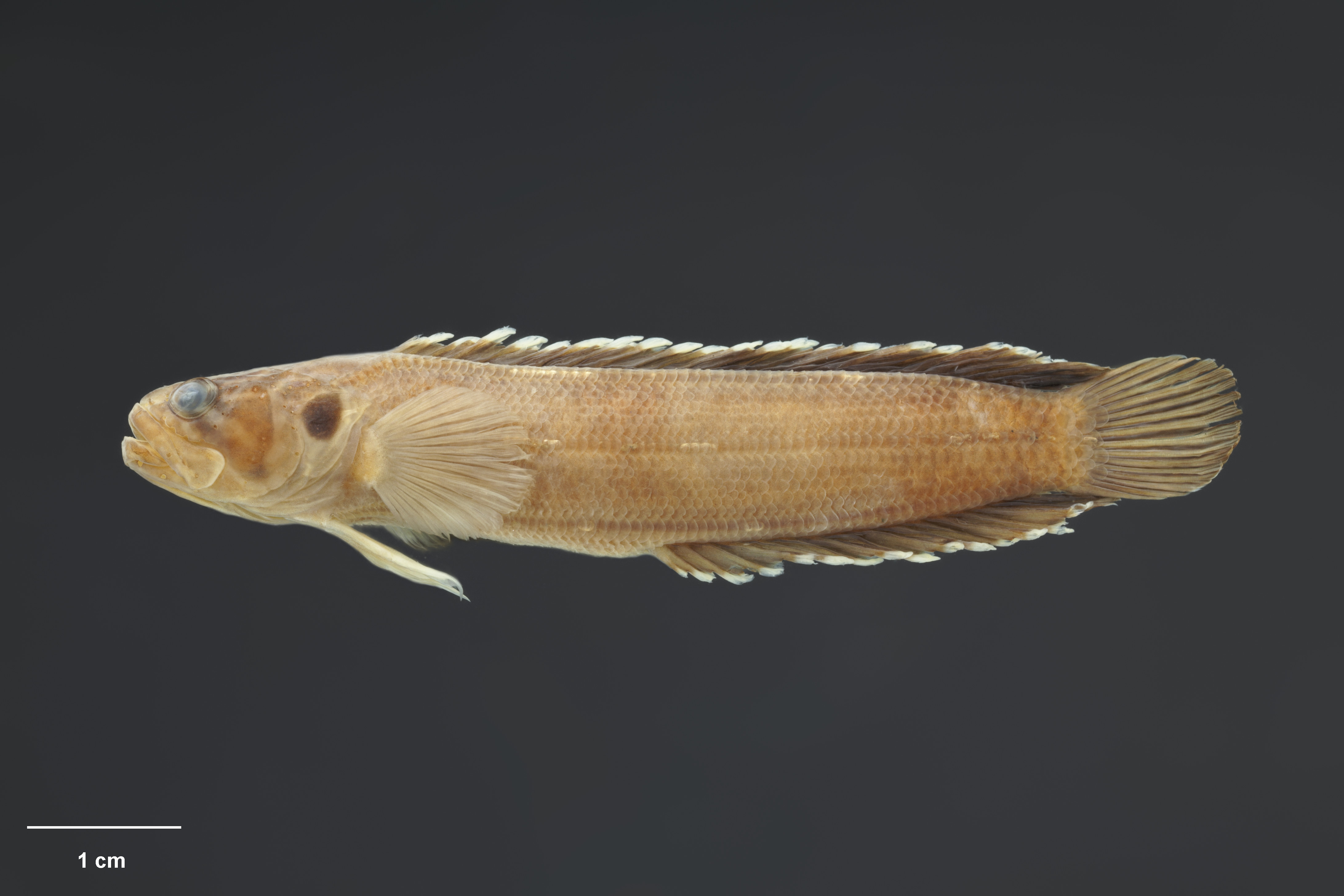
- Type specimen from the collections of Te Papa

Scientific classification
- Kingdom: Animalia
- Phylum: Chordata
- Class: Actinopterygii
- Order: Blenniiformes
- Family: Plesiopidae
- Genus: Acanthoclinus
- Species: A. rua

Binomial name
- Acanthoclinus rua (Hardy, 1985)

Synonyms
- Taumakoides rua Hardy, 1985

= Little rockfish =

Species of fish

The little rockfish (Acanthoclinus rua) is a longfin of the family Plesiopidae, found only in New Zealand's subtidal zone and in rock pools at low tide. They are up to 11 cm (4.3 in) in length.
