= Acanthoplesiops naka =

Tongan spiny basslet

Scientific classification
- Domain: Eukaryota
- Kingdom: Animalia
- Phylum: Chordata
- Class: Actinopterygii
- Order: Blenniiformes
- Family: Plesiopidae
- Genus: Acanthoplesiops
- Species: A. naka

Binomial name
- Acanthoplesiops naka Mooi & Gill, 2004

Species of fish

The tongan spiny basslet (Acanthoplesiops naka) is a fish of the family Plesiopidae. It is only known from a single specimen of about 1 cm standard length collected from Ofolanga Island, Tonga, in 1993.

This is a generally brown fish with small blackish spots. The caudal peduncle and the tips of the fins are pale. It can be distinguished from congeners by the unique number (18) of dorsal fin spines.
