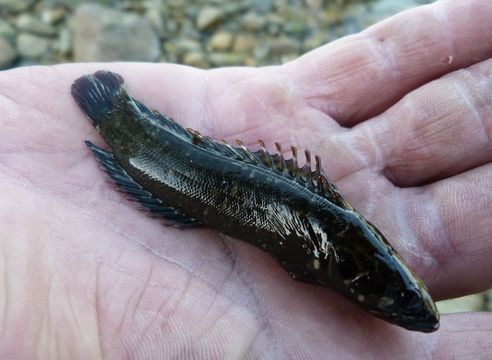

Scientific classification
- Kingdom: Animalia
- Phylum: Chordata
- Class: Actinopterygii
- Division: Teleostei
- Order: Blenniiformes
- Family: Plesiopidae
- Genus: Acanthoclinus
- Species: A. fuscus

Binomial name
- Acanthoclinus fuscus Jenyns, 1842

= Olive rockfish =

Species of fish

The olive rockfish (Acanthoclinus fuscus; Māori: taumaka) is a longfin of the family Plesiopidae. Found only in New Zealand's intertidal zone and in rock pools at low tide, the fish grow to a length of up to 30 cm (12 in). They are permanent inhabitants of the intertidal zone, which demonstrate homing behaviour, and are found in pools among rocks or boulders. If the conditions in these pools become unsuitable they may leave the pools. Their diet consists mostly of invertebrates, mainly crustaceans and molluscs. They are able to breathe air. This species swims with a sinuous motion similar to an eel. The male guards the eggs. Olive rockfish are black with a distinctive white band on the head. They can be found in Moncks Bay in Christchurch New Zealand at High tide in winter months as well.
