= Plesiops auritus =

Scientific classification
- Domain: Eukaryota
- Kingdom: Animalia
- Phylum: Chordata
- Class: Actinopterygii
- Order: Blenniiformes
- Family: Plesiopidae
- Genus: Plesiops
- Species: P. auritus

Binomial name
- Plesiops auritus Mooi, 1995

Species of fish

Plesiops auritus is a species of marine fish belonging to the family Plesiopidae. This species grows to a maximum length of 7.6 cm (3.0 in). It is found on in the coral reefs and typically found at depths less than 15 m. P. auritus' lives in the Indo-Pacific from Sri Lanka up to the west coast of the Malaysian Peninsula near Phuket, and south along the western coast of Sumatra to north of Java. The male parent guards the eggs.
