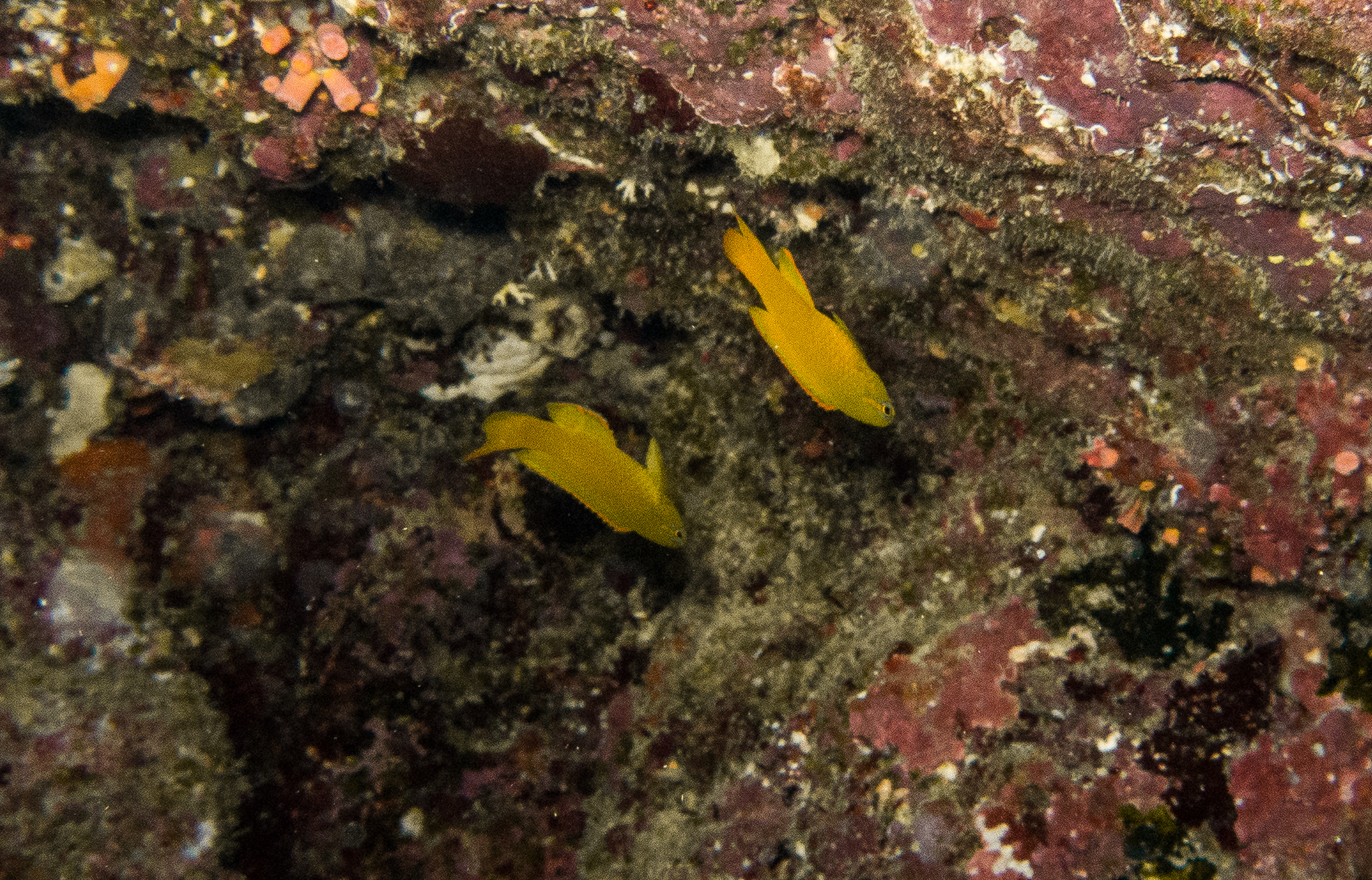
- Assessor flavissimus, characteristically feeding inverted

Conservation status
- Least Concern (IUCN 3.1)

Scientific classification
- Kingdom: Animalia
- Phylum: Chordata
- Class: Actinopterygii
- Order: Blenniiformes
- Family: Plesiopidae
- Genus: Assessor
- Species: A. flavissimus

Binomial name
- Assessor flavissimus Allen & Kuiter, 1976

= Assessor flavissimus =

Species of fish

Assessor flavissimus, the yellow devilfish or yellow scissortail, is a fish from the western Central Pacific, recorded from the Great Barrier Reef and Papua New Guinea. It occasionally makes its way into the aquarium trade. It grows to a size of 5.5 cm (2.2 in) in length. It is bright yellow in colour and has a reddish-orange stripe running from the eye to the upper edge of the operculum, and a reddish-orange band on the dorsal and anal fins which is parallel to the fin margin. This species feeds on plankton and forms small groups under overhangs and ledges and in crevices, often swimming upside down. The males mouthbrood, guarding the eggs in their mouths.
