= Beliops =

Scientific classification
- Kingdom: Animalia
- Phylum: Chordata
- Class: Actinopterygii
- Order: Blenniiformes
- Family: Plesiopidae
- Subfamily: Acanthoclininae
- Genus: Beliops; Hardy, 1985

Type species
- Beliops xanthokrossos Hardy, 1985

Genus of fishes

Beliops is a genus of ray-finned fish from the longfin family Plesiopidae. They are found in the western Pacific Ocean in Australia and the Philippines.

== Species ==
There are currently two recognised species:

- Beliops batanensis Smith-Vaniz & Johnson, 1990 (Batan longfin)
- Beliops xanthokrossos Hardy, 1985 (Southern longfin)
