= Steeneichthys =

Scientific classification
- Kingdom: Animalia
- Phylum: Chordata
- Class: Actinopterygii
- Order: Blenniiformes
- Family: Plesiopidae
- Subfamily: Plesiopinae
- Genus: Steeneichthys; Allen & Randall, 1985

Type species
- Steeneichthys plesiopsus Allen & Randall, 1985

Genus of fishes

Steeneichthys is a genus of ray-finned fish in the family Plesiopidae, the longfins or roundheads.

== Species ==
There are two recognised species in the genus:

- Steeneichthys nativitatus Allen, 1987 (Christmas longfin)
- Steeneichthys plesiopsus Allen & Randall, 1985 (Steene's prettyfin)
