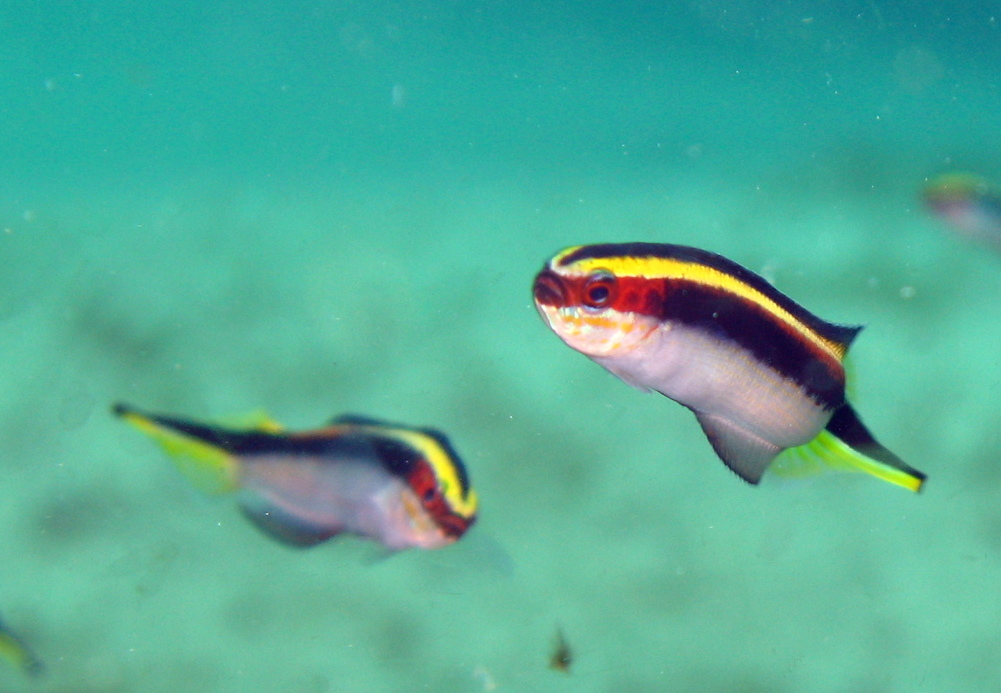
- Trachinops taeniatus

Scientific classification
- Kingdom: Animalia
- Phylum: Chordata
- Class: Actinopterygii
- Order: Blenniiformes
- Family: Plesiopidae
- Subfamily: Plesiopinae
- Genus: Trachinops; Günther, 1861

Type species
- Trachinops taeniatus Günther, 1861

= Trachinops =

Genus of fishes

Trachinops, the hulafishes, is a genus of ray-finned fish in the family Plesiopidae, the longfins or roundheads.

== Species ==
There are four recognised species in the genus:

- Trachinops brauni Allen, 1977 (Bluelined hulafish)
- Trachinops caudimaculatus McCoy, 1890 (Southern hulafish)
- Trachinops noarlungae Glover, 1974 (Yellowhead hulafish)
- Trachinops taeniatus Günther, 1861 ( Eastern hulafish)
