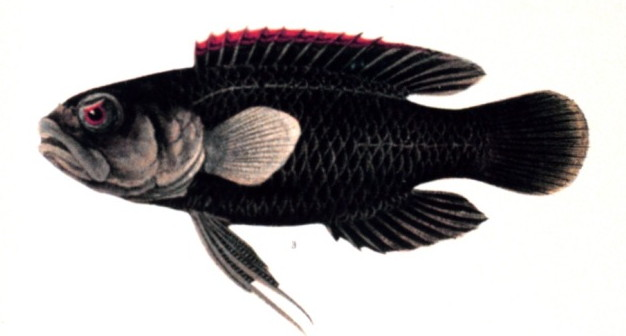

Conservation status
- Least Concern (IUCN 3.1)

Scientific classification
- Kingdom: Animalia
- Phylum: Chordata
- Class: Actinopterygii
- Order: Blenniiformes
- Family: Plesiopidae
- Genus: Plesiops
- Species: P. coeruleolineatus

Binomial name
- Plesiops coeruleolineatus Rüppell, 1835

Synonyms
- Pharopteryx melas (Bleeker, 1849); Pharopteryx semeion (Tanaka, 1917); Plesiops caeruleolineatus Rüppell, 1835; Plesiops melas Bleeker, 1849; Plesiops nigricans apoda Kner, 1868; Plesiops semeion Tanaka, 1917; Plesiops welas Bleeker, 1849; Pseudochromichthys riukianus Schmidt, 1931

= Plesiops coeruleolineatus =

Species of fish

Plesiops coeruleolineatus, the crimsontip longfin or coral devil, is a species of fish in the family Plesiopidae.

== Description ==
P. coeruleolineatus has an elongated body that grows to a length of 8.5 to 10 cm (3.3 to 3.9 in). Although colours vary, it is generally has a black or brown body, with two dark stripes behind the eye. The dorsal spines are tipped with orange or red, bordered below with a line white. It has a bluish stripe running along the basal part of the dorsal fin.

== Distribution ==
The crimsontip longfin is widely found in the Indo-Pacific from the Red Sea and East Africa, east to the Samoa Islands, Oceania, and southern Japan, and south to Australia at Queensland.

It has been recorded in such specific locations as Cargados Carajos, Comores, Eritrea, Kenya, Madagascar, Mauritius, Mozambique, Réunion, and the Seychelles.

== Habitat ==
This is a very common yet secretive species. It lives in shallow, outer-reef areas at depths to 15 m (49 ft). During the day, it usually remains under coral and stones in lagoons and in flood basins. It may appear when disturbing rubble in pools. It emerges at night, venturing into the open to feed on fish, gastropods, and small crustaceans.
