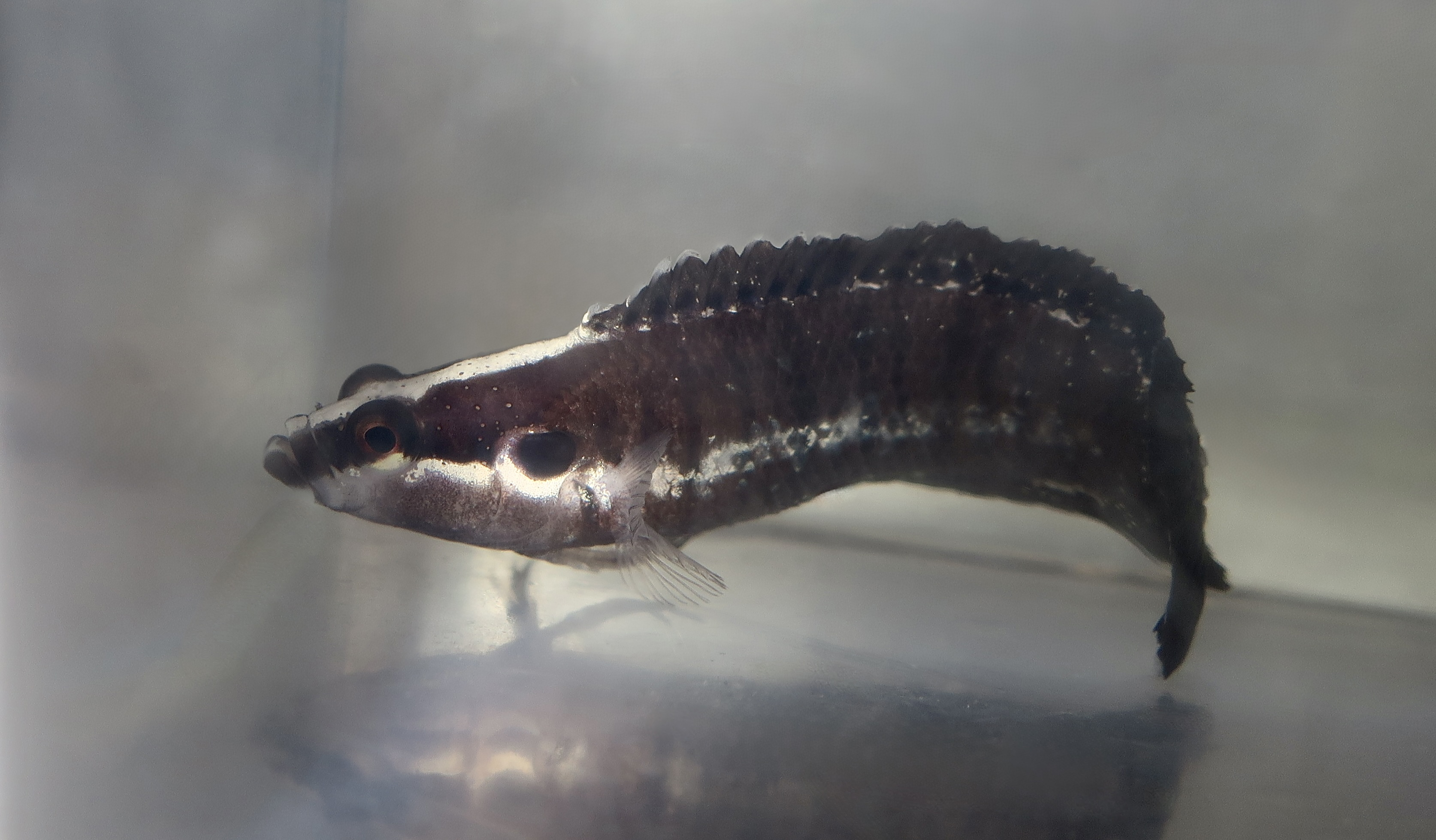

Conservation status
- Least Concern (IUCN 3.1)

Scientific classification
- Kingdom: Animalia
- Phylum: Chordata
- Class: Actinopterygii
- Order: Blenniiformes
- Family: Plesiopidae
- Subfamily: Acanthoclininae
- Genus: Belonepterygion; McCulloch, 1915
- Species: B. fasciolatum

Binomial name
- Belonepterygion fasciolatum (Ogilby, 1889)

Synonyms
- Acanthoclinus fasciolatus Ogilby, 1889; Ernogrammoides fasciatus Chen & Liang, 1948; Belonepterygion fasciatus (Chen & Liang, 1948); Calliblennius rubescens Aoyagi, 1954

= Barred spiny basslet =

Species of fish

The barred spiny basslet (Belonepterygion fasciolatum) is a species of ray-finned fish in the family Plesiopidae, the longfins or roundheads. It occurs on reefs in the western Pacific Ocean from Japan south to Australia and east to New Caledonia. It is the only species in its genus.
