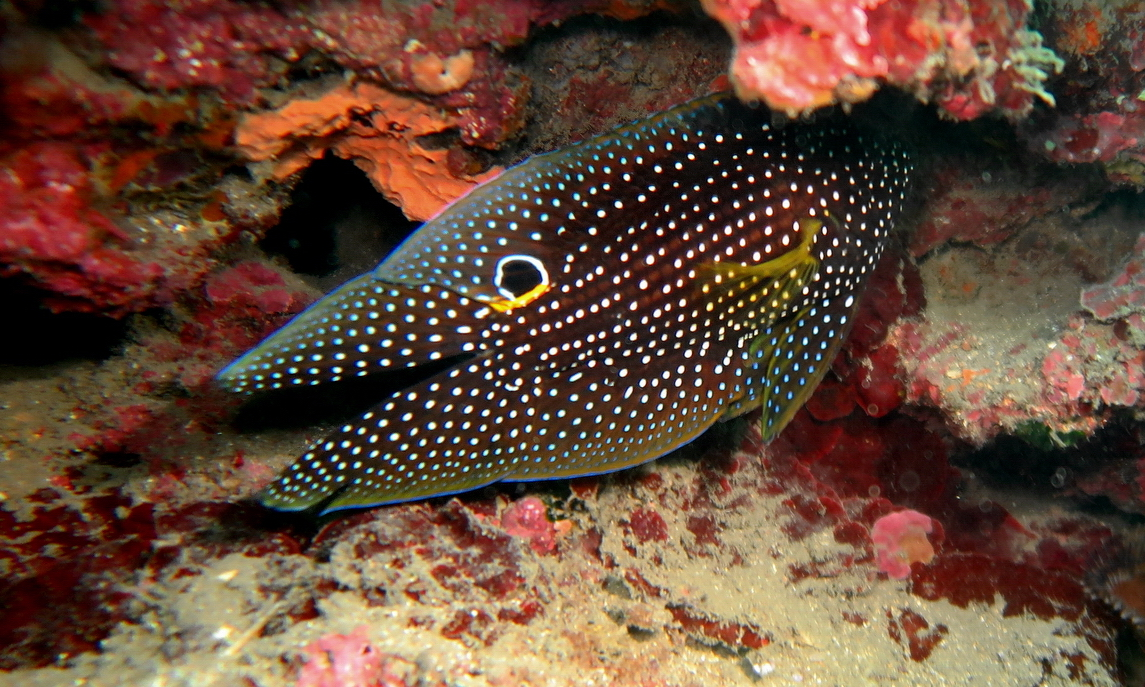
- Calloplesiops altivelis

Scientific classification
- Kingdom: Animalia
- Phylum: Chordata
- Class: Actinopterygii
- Order: Blenniiformes
- Family: Plesiopidae
- Subfamily: Plesiopinae
- Genus: Calloplesiops; Fowler & B.A. Bean, 1930

Type species
- Calloplesiops niveus Fowler & Bean 1930

Synonyms
- Barrosia J. L. B. Smith, 1952

= Calloplesiops =

Genus of fishes

Calloplesiops is a genus of ray-finned fish from the family Plesiopidae, the longfins or roundheads. They are found in the Indo-Pacific.

== Species ==
There are two species currently recognised in the genus Calloplesiops:

- Calloplesiops altivelis Steindachner, 1903 (Comet)
- Calloplesiops argus Fowler & B.A. Bean, 1930
