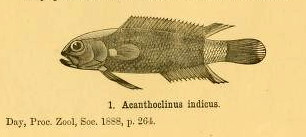
- Acanthoplesiops indicus

Scientific classification
- Kingdom: Animalia
- Phylum: Chordata
- Class: Actinopterygii
- Clade: Ovalentaria
- Order: Blenniiformes
- Family: Plesiopidae
- Subfamily: Acanthoclininae; Günther, 1861

= Acanthoclininae =

Subfamily of fishes

The Acanthoclininae is a subfamily of ray-finned fishes, one of two in the family Plesiopidae. They are characterised by the head being scaleless or nearly scaleless, a dorsal fin which has 17–26 spines and 2–6 soft rays, an anal fin having 7–16 spines and 2–6 soft rays while the pelvic fin has one spine and two soft rays. There are between one and four lateral lines, the number of vertebrae is between 26 and 35. They grow to a maximum length about 30 centimetres (12 in).

== Genera ==
The genera currently recognised as belonging to the subfamily Acanthoclininae are:

- Genus Acanthoclinus Jenyns, 1841
- Genus Acanthoplesiops Regan, 1912
- Genus Beliops Hardy, 1985
- Genus Belonepterygion McCulloch, 1915
- Genus Notograptus Günther, 1867
