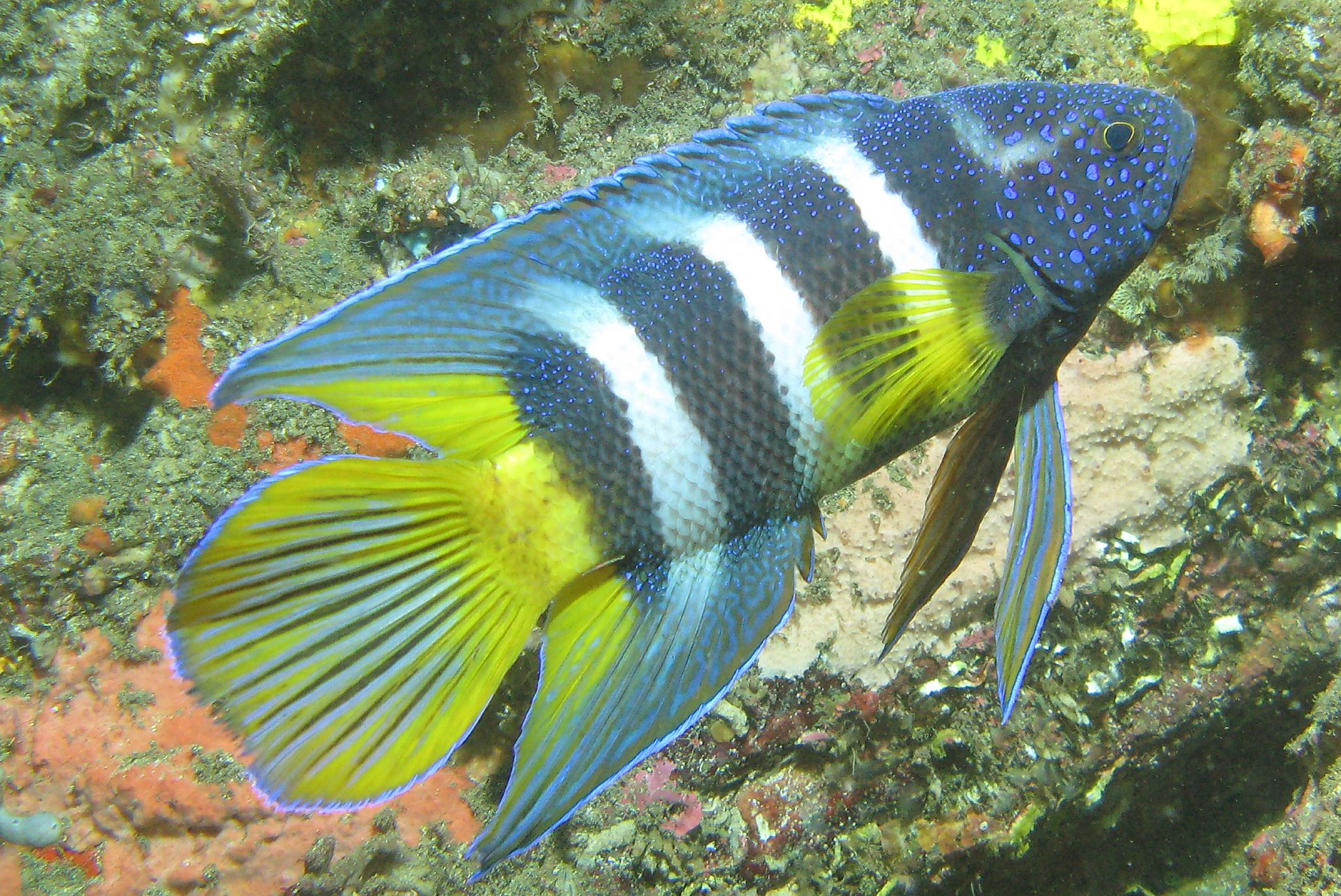

Scientific classification
- Kingdom: Animalia
- Phylum: Chordata
- Class: Actinopterygii
- Order: Blenniiformes
- Family: Plesiopidae
- Genus: Paraplesiops
- Species: P. bleekeri

Binomial name
- Paraplesiops bleekeri (Günther, 1861)

Synonyms
- Plesiops bleekeri Günther, 1861

= Paraplesiops bleekeri =

Species of fish

Paraplesiops bleekeri, commonly known as the eastern blue devil, blue-tipped long-fin or Bleeker's blue devil fish, is a species of fish in the family Plesiopidae. This colourful, secretive fish is endemic to Australia, where it is a protected species.

== Description ==
This species grows to 40 cm, and is recognizable by blue and white bands on the body, blue spots on the head, and blue dorsal and anal fins. It also has a yellow base, pectoral, and caudal fins. The pelvic, posterior dorsal, and anal fins are all elongated.

This species is a close relative of the southern blue devil (Paraplesiops meleagris), which lives in the colder southern Australian waters.

== Distribution ==
The fish is found in coastal waters of eastern Australia between the Gold Coast of southern Queensland and Montague Island, most commonly between Sydney and Ulladulla.

== Behaviour ==
This species is shy and secretive. Males have appeared to defend territories in caves or overhangs, where it remains to attract females and drive males away. They are most active at night.

== Habitat ==
Paraplesiops bleekeri are benthic coastal reef inhabitants. They live inside caves, under ledges and overhangs in reefs and estuaries. They were considered to inhabit waters ranging from 3 to 30 metres in depth, and are most often encountered in shallow waters less than 20 metres, however, recent observations suggest they also inhabit offshore reefs down to at least 50 metres.

== Diet ==
This fish is known to eat brittle stars.

== Conservation status ==
This species is protected under the laws of New South Wales Fisheries, in particular, the Fisheries Management Act 1994. It is illegal to collect or possess them without a permit.

They are protected because of their low abundance, and their desirability in the marine aquarium industry.

Efforts to protect them have included the conservation and protection of benthic estuarine habitats, as well as rocky offshore reef areas where they breed. Some protected habitats are:

- Solitary Islands Marine Park
- Port Stephens – Great Lakes Marine Park
- Jervis Bay Marine Park
- Long Reef Aquatic Reserve
- Bushrangers Bay Aquatic Reserve

== Name ==
The specific name honours the Dutch ichthyologist and physician Pieter Bleeker (1819-1878) who named two congeners of this species.
