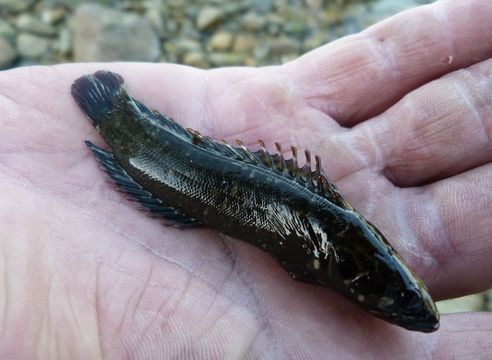
- Acanthoclinus fuscus

Scientific classification
- Kingdom: Animalia
- Phylum: Chordata
- Class: Actinopterygii
- Division: Teleostei
- Order: Blenniiformes
- Family: Plesiopidae
- Subfamily: Acanthoclininae
- Genus: Acanthoclinus; Jenyns, 1841

Type species
- Acanthoclinus fuscus Jenyns, 1841

= Acanthoclinus =

Genus of fishes

Acanthoclinus is a genus of roundheads of the family Plesiopidae. They are elongated in shape with large mouths and eyes, and are found in the oceans around New Zealand. The species in the genus include:

- Acanthoclinus fuscus Jenyns, 1841 (Olive rockfish)
- Acanthoclinus littoreus (Forster, 1801) (New Zealand rockfish)
- Acanthoclinus marilynae (Hardy, 1985) (Stout rockfish)
- Acanthoclinus matti (Hardy, 1985)
- Acanthoclinus rua (Hardy, 1985) (Little rockfish)
