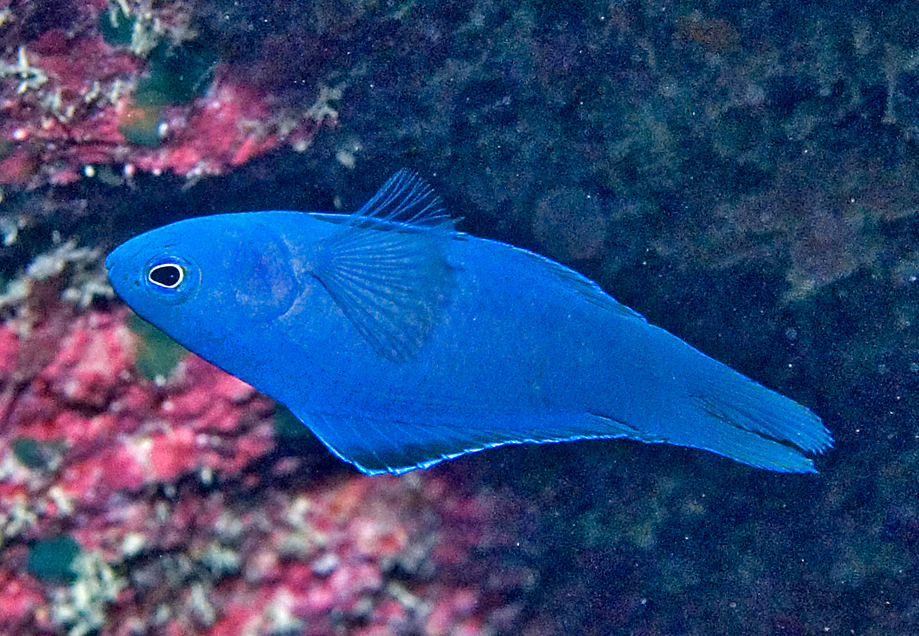
- Assessor macneilli

Scientific classification
- Kingdom: Animalia
- Phylum: Chordata
- Class: Actinopterygii
- Order: Blenniiformes
- Family: Plesiopidae
- Subfamily: Plesiopinae
- Genus: Assessor whitley, 1935

Type species
- Assessor macneilli Whitley, 1935

= Assessor (fish) =

Genus of fishes

Assessor is a genus of ray-finned fishes which belong to the longfin family Plesiopidae. They are found in the western Pacific Ocean from Japan to Australia.

== Species ==
Three species are currently recognised as belonging to Assessor:

- Assessor flavissimus Allen & Kuiter, 1976 (yellow devilfish)
- Assessor macneilli Whitley, 1935 (blue devilfish)
- Assessor randalli Allen & Kuiter, 1976 (Randall's devilfish)
