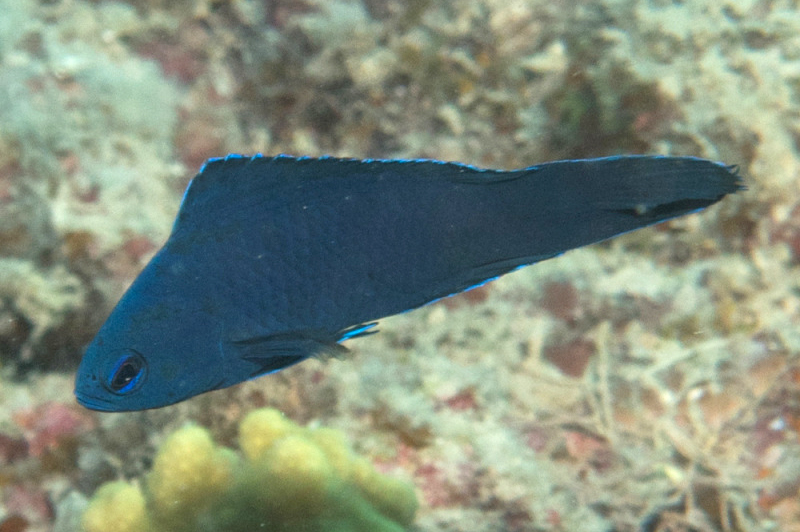
- blue scissortail
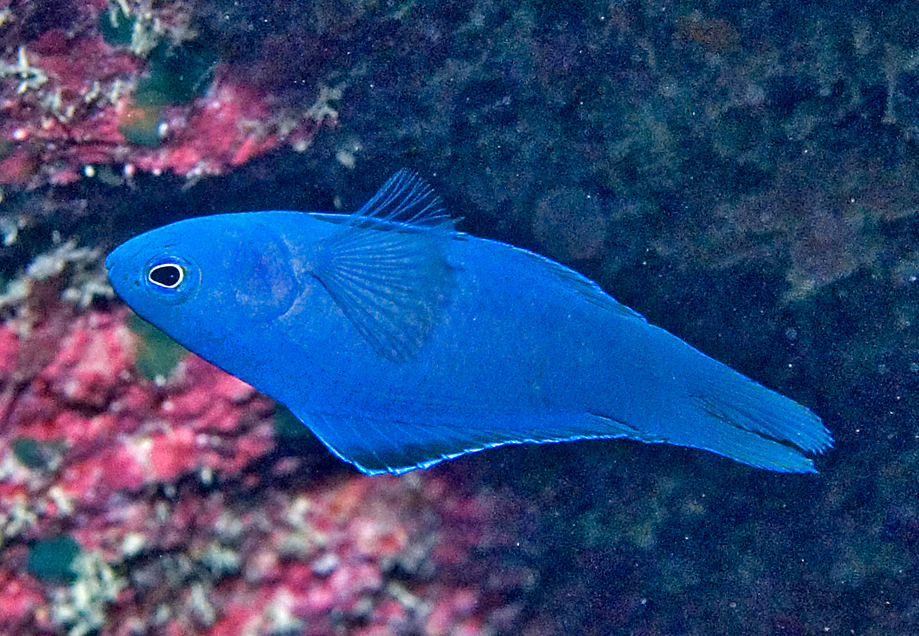
- blue devilfish

Conservation status
- Least Concern (IUCN 3.1)

Scientific classification
- Kingdom: Animalia
- Phylum: Chordata
- Class: Actinopterygii
- Order: Blenniiformes
- Family: Plesiopidae
- Genus: Assessor
- Species: A. macneilli

Binomial name
- Assessor macneilli Whitley, 1935

= Assessor macneilli =

Species of fish

Assessor macneilli, the blue devilfish or blue scissortail, is a fish from the southwest Pacific Ocean. It occasionally makes its way into the aquarium trade. It grows to 6 centimetres (2.4 in) in length. It is purple-blue with long fins.

== Description ==
Assessor macneilli is a dark blue fish which has a thin paler blue edge on the dorsal, anal, and pelvic fins. The dorsal fin has 11 spines and 8–10 rays, the anal fin has 3 spines and 9–10 rays and the pectoral fins have 14–16 rays.

== Distribution ==
The blue devilfish is found in the western Pacific Ocean from north eastern Australia and New Guinea, through the Great Barrier Reef and the Coral Sea to New Caledonia.

== Habitat and biology ==
Assessor macneilli is found on reefs at depths of 2–20 metres (6.6–65.6 ft), where it can group together in shoals of up 100 fishes in caves, crevices and under ledges, where they often swim upside down. It is a plankton feeder and its main food are crustaceans such as copepods, ostracods and amphipods. It is a mouthbrooder and the male guards the eggs in his mouth for 15–16 days, as hatching approaches the male keeps his mouth open continually and shifts the eggs backwards and forwards every 2–8 minutes.

== Etymology ==
Assessor macneilli was described in 1935 by G.P. Whitley from specimens collected at Hayman Island in the Whitsunday Passage off Queensland. Whitley did not set out why he chose the name but it is thought that the genus name Assessor means assistant or helper and that the specific name refers to Whitley's colleague, the carcinologist Francis A. McNeill of the Australian Museum. McNeill probably assisted Whitley in his ichthyological collections.
