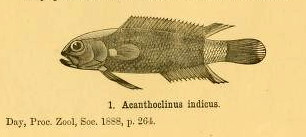
- Acanthoplesiops indicus

Scientific classification
- Kingdom: Animalia
- Phylum: Chordata
- Class: Actinopterygii
- Order: Blenniiformes
- Family: Plesiopidae
- Subfamily: Acanthoclininae
- Genus: Acanthoplesiops; Regan, 1912

Type species
- Acanthoclinus indicus Day, 1888

= Acanthoplesiops =

Genus of fishes

Acanthoplesiops is a genus of reef-dwelling fishes belonging to the family Plesiopidae. All species are very small, with the largest specimen recorded only reaching 27 mm standard length. They have several features which distinguish them from other plesiopids, the most obvious of which is the presence of one or two spines on the operculum.

== Species ==
There are currently 6 recognized species in this genus:

- Acanthoplesiops cappuccino A. C. Gill, Bogorodsky & A. O. Mal, 2013 (Red Sea spiny basslet)
- Acanthoplesiops echinatus Smith-Vaniz & G. D. Johnson, 1990 (Hiatt's longfin)
- Acanthoplesiops hiatti L. P. Schultz, 1953 (Hiatt's basslet)
- Acanthoplesiops indicus F. Day, 1888 (Scottie)
- Acanthoplesiops jessicae G. R. Allen, Erdmann & William M. Brooks, 2020
- Acanthoplesiops naka Mooi & A. C. Gill, 2004 (Tongan spiny basslet)
- Acanthoplesiops psilogaster Hardy, 1985 (Barebelly longfin)
