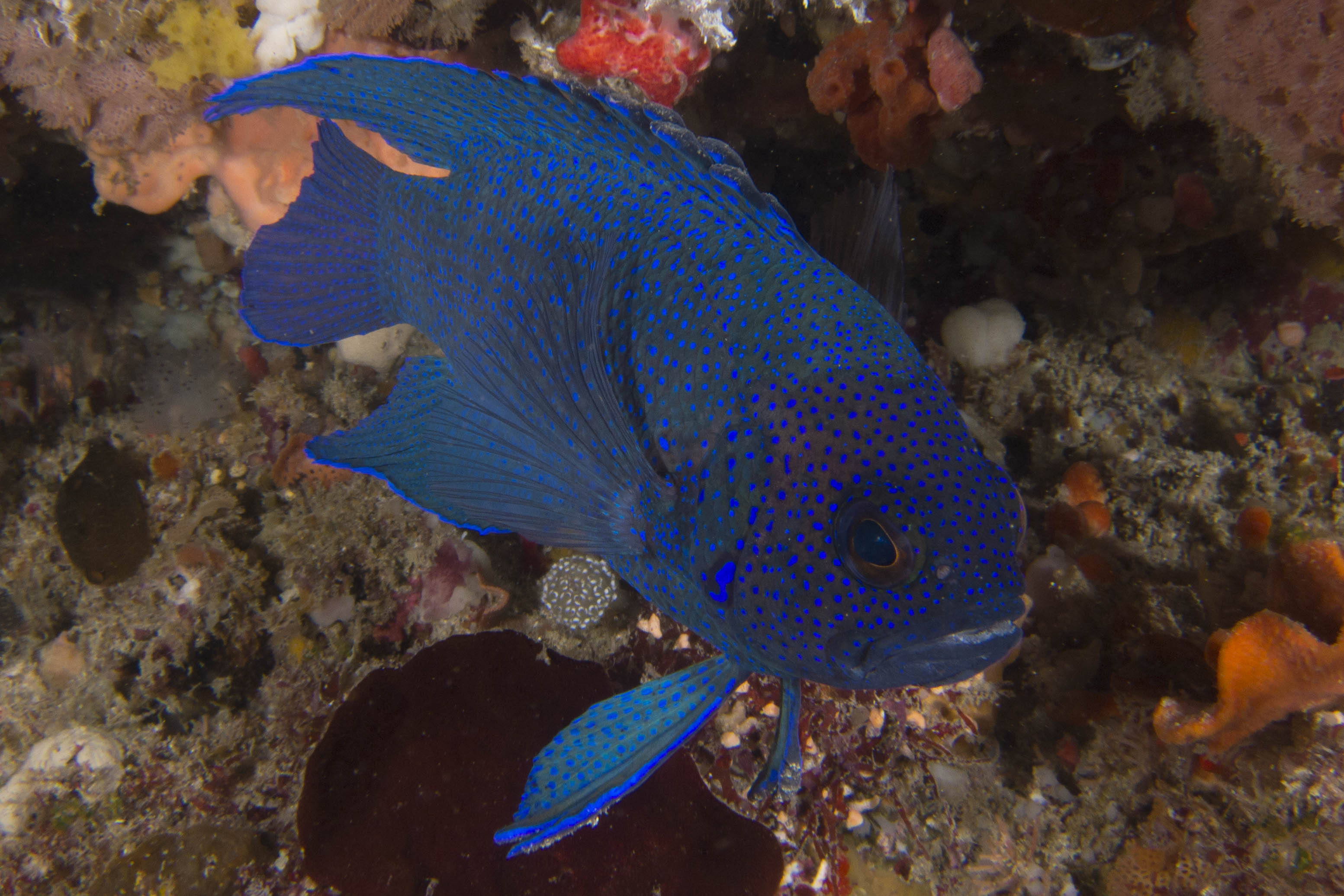
- Western blue devil Paraplesiops sinclairi

Scientific classification
- Kingdom: Animalia
- Phylum: Chordata
- Class: Actinopterygii
- Order: Blenniiformes
- Family: Plesiopidae
- Genus: Paraplesiops
- Species: P. sinclairi

Binomial name
- Paraplesiops sinclairi Hutchins, 1987

= Western blue devil =

Species of fish

The western blue devil (Paraplesiops sinclairi) is a species of fish in the longfin family Plesiopidae endemic to Western Australia. The fish is found in rocky reef habitats in the coastal, inshore waters of southwestern Western Australia, from the Recherche Archipelago to Lancelin. The specific name was coined as a memorial to the ichthyologist Nicholas Sinclair of the Australian Museum who was involved in the collection of the type specimens.
