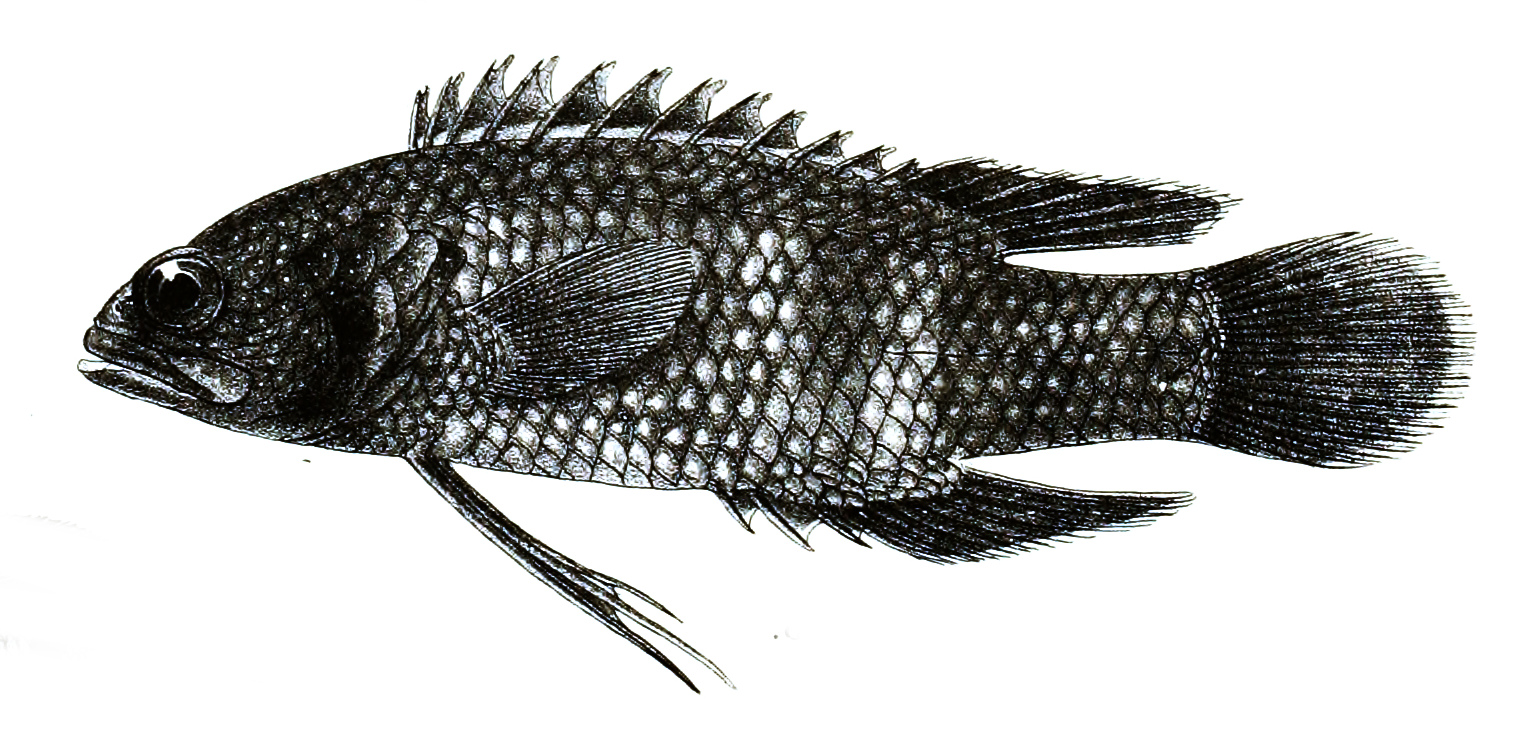
- Plesiops nigricans

Scientific classification
- Kingdom: Animalia
- Phylum: Chordata
- Class: Actinopterygii
- Order: Blenniiformes
- Family: Plesiopidae
- Subfamily: Plesiopinae
- Genus: Plesiops; Oken, 1817

Type species
- Pharopteryx nigricans Rüppell 1828

Synonyms
- Pharopteryx Rüppell, 1828; Pseudochromichthys Schmidt, 1931

= Plesiops =

Genus of fishes

Plesiops is a genus of ray-finned fishes in the family Plesiopidae. It is a genus of small fishes which vary in length from 5 centimetres (2.0 in) and 20 centimetres (7.9 in) and which live in shallow coral flats or around heads of coral. They have elongated pelvic fins and the other fins are marked with colourful patterns such as stripes and these give name to the common names "longfin" and "prettyfin". They are thought to be nocturnal and are infrequently seen in the wild. They are carnivorous and their diet is made up of crustaceans, gastropods and small fishes and sometimes on brittle stars. A defining characteristic of this genus is that they lay elongated eggs which are laid under rocks or overhangs and are guarded by the male.

== Species ==
The following species are currently recognised within the genus Plesiops:

- Plesiops auritus Mooi, 1995
- Plesiops cephalotaenia Inger, 1955
- Plesiops coeruleolineatus Rüppell, 1835
- Plesiops corallicola Bleeker, 1853
- Plesiops facicavus Mooi, 1995
- Plesiops genaricus Mooi & Randall, 1991
- Plesiops gracilis Mooi & Randall, 1991
- Plesiops insularis Mooi & Randall, 1991
- Plesiops malalaxus Mooi, 1995
- Plesiops multisquamata Inger, 1955
- Plesiops mystaxus Mooi, 1995
- Plesiops nakaharae Tanaka, 1917
- Plesiops nigricans (Rüppell, 1828)
- Plesiops oxycephalus Bleeker, 1855
- Plesiops polydactylus Mooi, 1995
- Plesiops thysanopterus Mooi, 1995
- Plesiops verecundus Mooi, 1995
