= Carp prettyfin =

Scientific classification
- Kingdom: Animalia
- Phylum: Chordata
- Class: Actinopterygii
- Order: Blenniiformes
- Family: Plesiopidae
- Genus: Fraudella
- Species: F. carassiops

Binomial name
- Fraudella carassiops Whitley, 1935

Species of fish

The carp prettyfin (Fraudella carassiops) is a species of ray-finned fish from the family Plesiopidae, the longfins or roundheads. It is endemic to Australia where it occurs over soft substrates. It is the only species in its genus.
