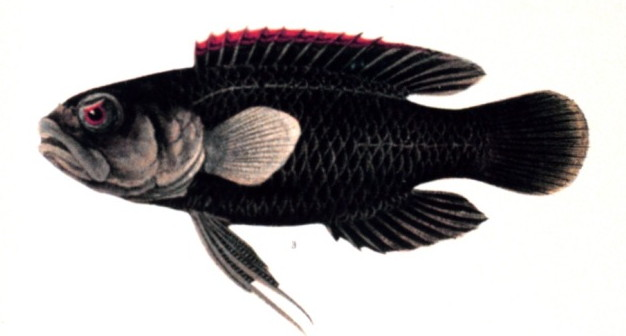
- Crimsontip longfin, (Plesiops coeruleolineatus)

Scientific classification
- Kingdom: Animalia
- Phylum: Chordata
- Class: Actinopterygii
- Clade: Percomorpha
- Clade: Ovalentaria
- Order: Blenniiformes
- Family: Plesiopidae; Günther, 1861

Subfamilies
- Plesiopinae Günther, 1861; Acanthoclininae Günther, 1861; See text for genera.

Synonyms
- Acanthoclinidae

= Longfin =

Family of fishes

The longfins, also known as roundheads or spiny basslets, are a family, Plesiopidae, which were formerly placed in the order Perciformes or considered indeterminate percomorphs, but are now considered basal blenniiforms. They are elongated fishes, found in the Indian Ocean and western Pacific Ocean.

== Classification ==
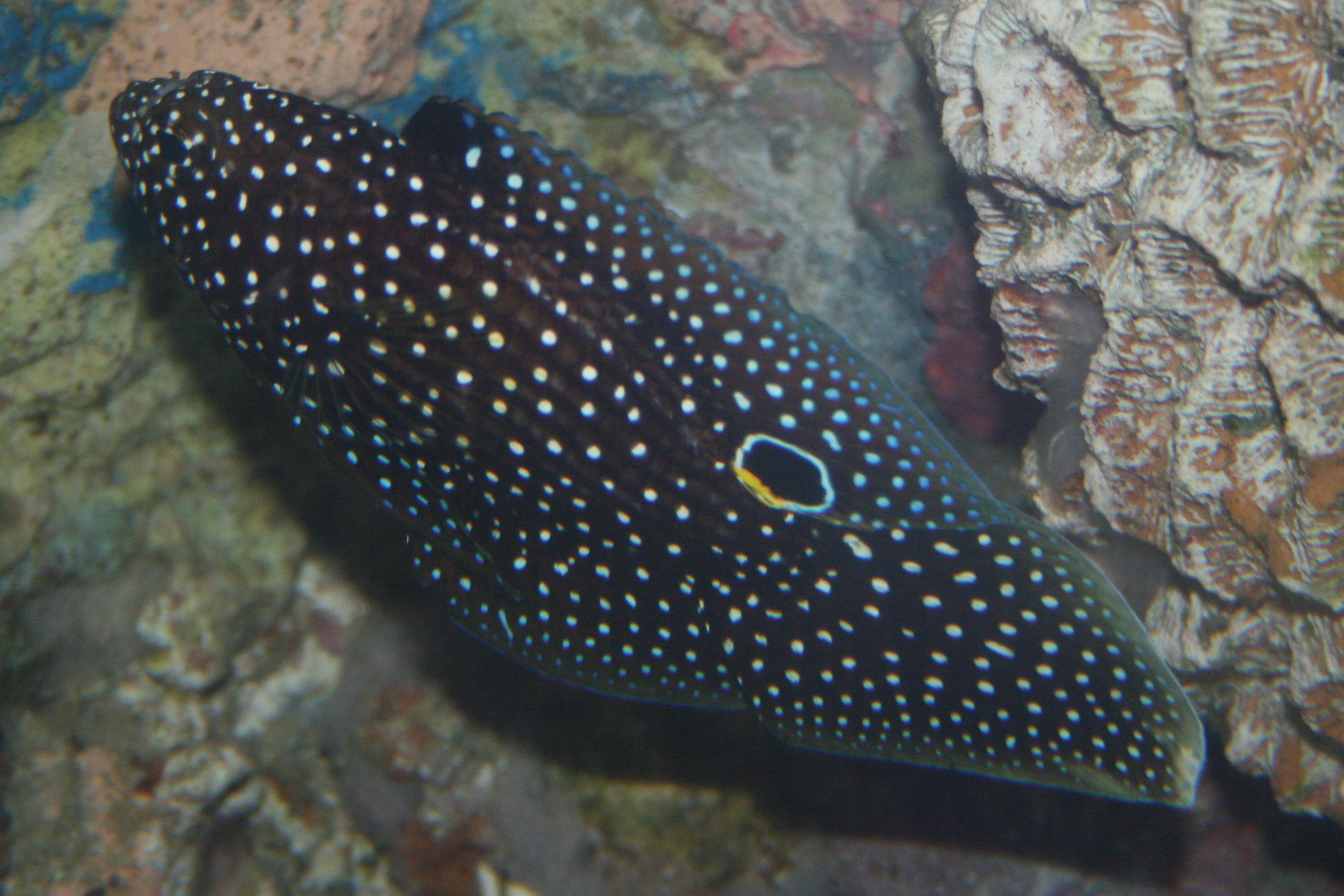
Comet, Calloplesiops altivelis

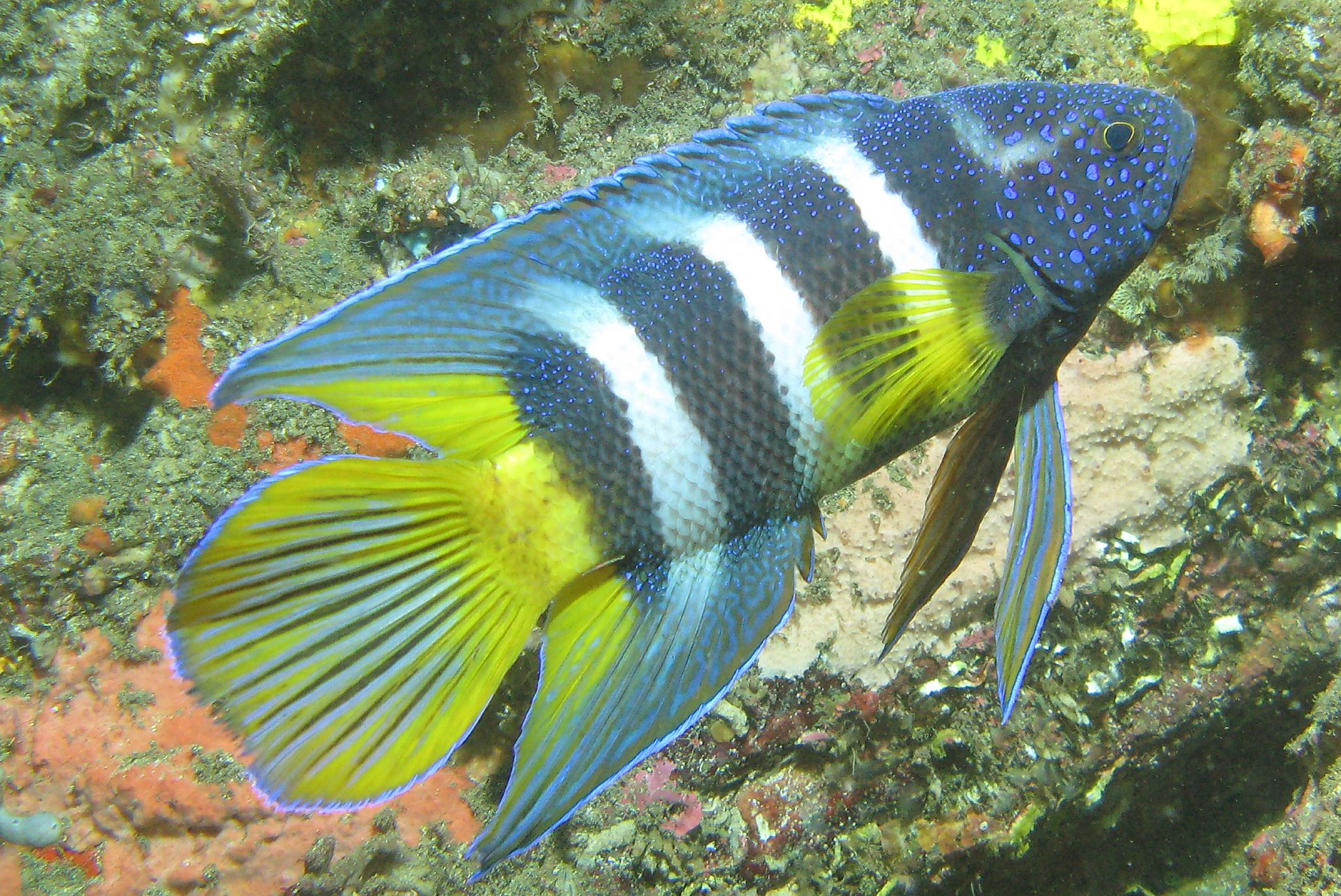
Eastern blue devil, Paraplesiops bleekeri

In some classifications, the genus Notograptus is split in its own family, Notograptidae, but FishBase is followed here. There are two subfamilies within the Plesiopidae and the genera are as follows:

- Subfamily Acanthoclininae Günther, 1861
  - Genus Acanthoclinus Jenyns, 1841
  - Genus Acanthoplesiops Regan, 1912
  - Genus Beliops Hardy, 1985
  - Genus Belonepterygion McCulloch, 1915
  - Genus Notograptus Günther, 1867
- Subfamily Plesiopinae Günther, 1861
  - Genus Assessor Whitley, 1935
  - Genus Calloplesiops Fowler and Bean, 1930
  - Genus Fraudella Whitley, 1935
  - Genus Paraplesiops Bleeker, 1875
  - Genus Plesiops Oken, 1817
  - Genus Steeneichthys Gerald R. Allen and Randall, 1985
  - Genus Trachinops Günther, 1861
