= Pseudogramma polyacantha =

Scientific classification
- Kingdom: Animalia
- Phylum: Chordata
- Class: Actinopterygii
- Order: Perciformes
- Family: Grammistidae
- Genus: Pseudogramma
- Species: P. polyacantha

Binomial name
- Pseudogramma polyacantha (Bleeker, 1856)

Species of ray-finned fish

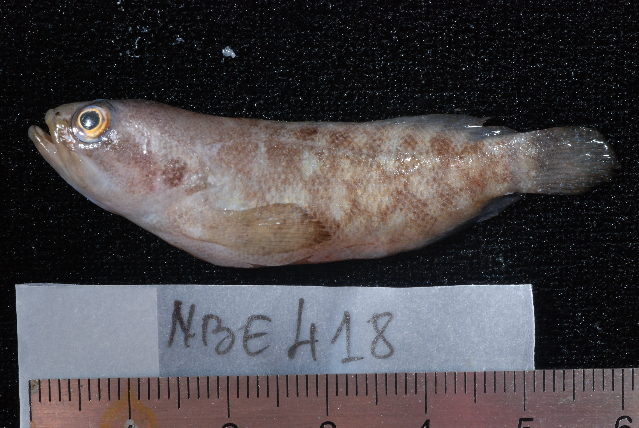
Pseudogramma polyacanthum.

Pseudogramma polyacantha, the palespot podge, is a species of marine ray-finned fish in the family Grammistidae, native to the Indo-Pacific.

The confused podge was once considered a subspecies of Pseudogramma polyacantha, but recent work has demonstrated it to be a distinct species.
