= Suttonia lineata =

Scientific classification
- Kingdom: Animalia
- Phylum: Chordata
- Class: Actinopterygii
- Order: Perciformes
- Family: Grammistidae
- Genus: Suttonia
- Species: S. lineata

Binomial name
- Suttonia lineata Gosline, 1960

Species of ray-finned fish

Suttonia lineata, the freckleface podge, is a species of marine ray-finned fish in the family Grammistidae. The freckleface podge is known from the Indo-Pacific.
