= Suttonia suttoni =

Scientific classification
- Kingdom: Animalia
- Phylum: Chordata
- Class: Actinopterygii
- Order: Perciformes
- Family: Grammistidae
- Genus: Suttonia
- Species: S. suttoni

Binomial name
- Suttonia suttoni J. L. B. Smith, 1953

Species of ray-finned fish

Suttonia suttoni is a species of marine ray-finned fish in the family Grammistidae.

Suttonia suttoni is known from the western Indian Ocean.
