= Pseudogramma australis =

Conservation status
- Least Concern (IUCN 3.1)

Scientific classification
- Kingdom: Animalia
- Phylum: Chordata
- Class: Actinopterygii
- Order: Perciformes
- Family: Grammistidae
- Genus: Pseudogramma
- Species: P. australis

Binomial name
- Pseudogramma australis Randall and Baldwin, 1997

Synonyms
- Pseudogramma australis pascuensis Randall and Baldwin, 1997

Species of ray-finned fish

Pseudogramma australis, the Pascua podge, is a species of marine ray-finned fish in the family Grammistidae, endemic to Easter Island.
