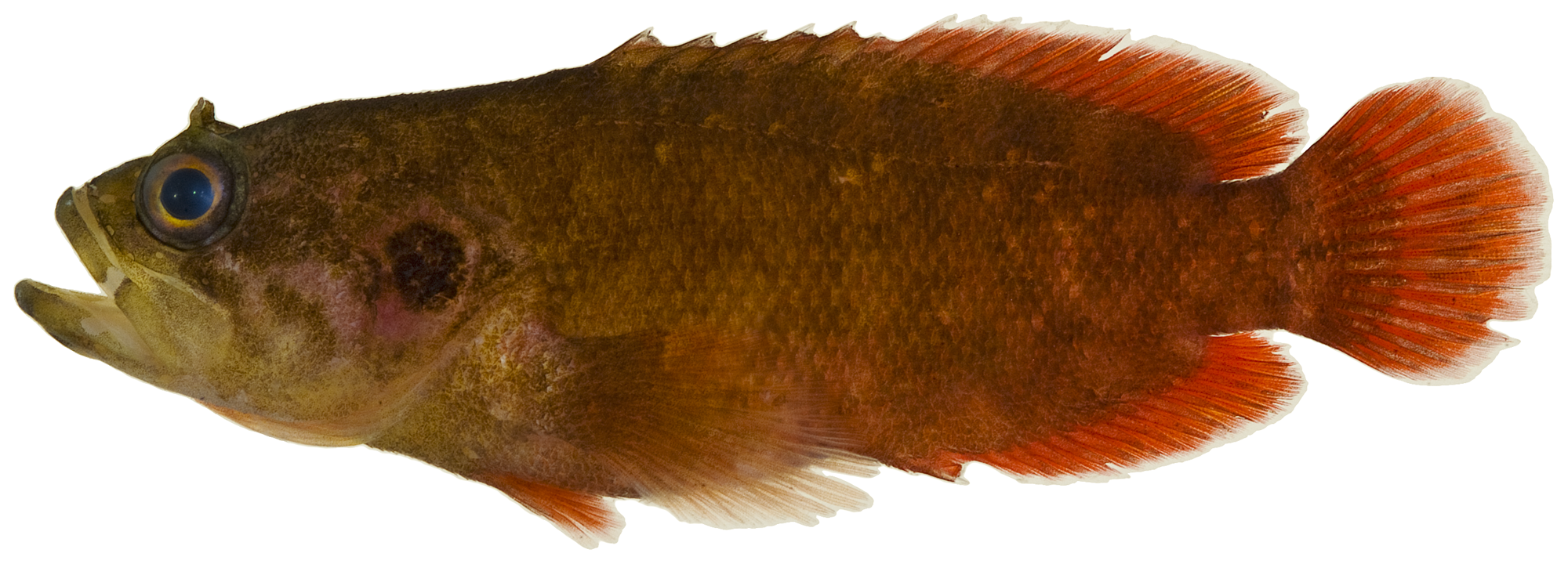
- Pseudogramma gregoryi

Scientific classification
- Kingdom: Animalia
- Phylum: Chordata
- Class: Actinopterygii
- Order: Perciformes
- Family: Grammistidae
- Genus: Pseudogramma; Bleeker, 1875

Type species
- Pseudochromis polyacanthus Bleeker, 1856

= Pseudogramma =

Genus of fishes

Pseudogramma is a genus of marine ray-finned fish, related to the groupers and classified within the family Grammistidae. They live on coral reefs and exhibit cryptic colors and patterns to conceal them. They are mainly found in the Indo-Pacific with one species in the eastern central Atlantic Ocean.

== Species ==
There are currently 14 recognized species in the genus:

- Pseudogramma astigma J. E. Randall & C. C. Baldwin, 1997 (Spot-less podge)
- Pseudogramma australis J. E. Randall & C. C. Baldwin, 1997 (Pascua podge)
- Pseudogramma axelrodi G. R. Allen & D. R. Robertson, 1995
- Pseudogramma brederi (Hildebrand, 1940) (Confused podge)
- Pseudogramma erythrea J. E. Randall & C. C. Baldwin, 1997 (Caban podge)
- Pseudogramma galzini J. T. Williams & Viviani, 2016 (Galzin's podge)
- Pseudogramma gregoryi (Breder, 1927) (Reef podge)
- Pseudogramma guineensis (Norman, 1935)
- Pseudogramma megamyctera J. E. Randall & C. C. Baldwin, 1997 (Big-nostril podge)
- Pseudogramma paucilepis J. T. Williams & Viviani, 2016 (Weak-scaled podge)
- Pseudogramma pectoralis J. E. Randall & C. C. Baldwin, 1997 (Pectoral podge)
- Pseudogramma polyacantha (Bleeker, 1856) (Pale-spot podge)
- Pseudogramma thaumasia (C. H. Gilbert, 1900) (Pacific reef podge)
- Pseudogramma xantha J. E. Randall, C. C. Baldwin & J. T. Williams, 2002 (Yellow podge)
