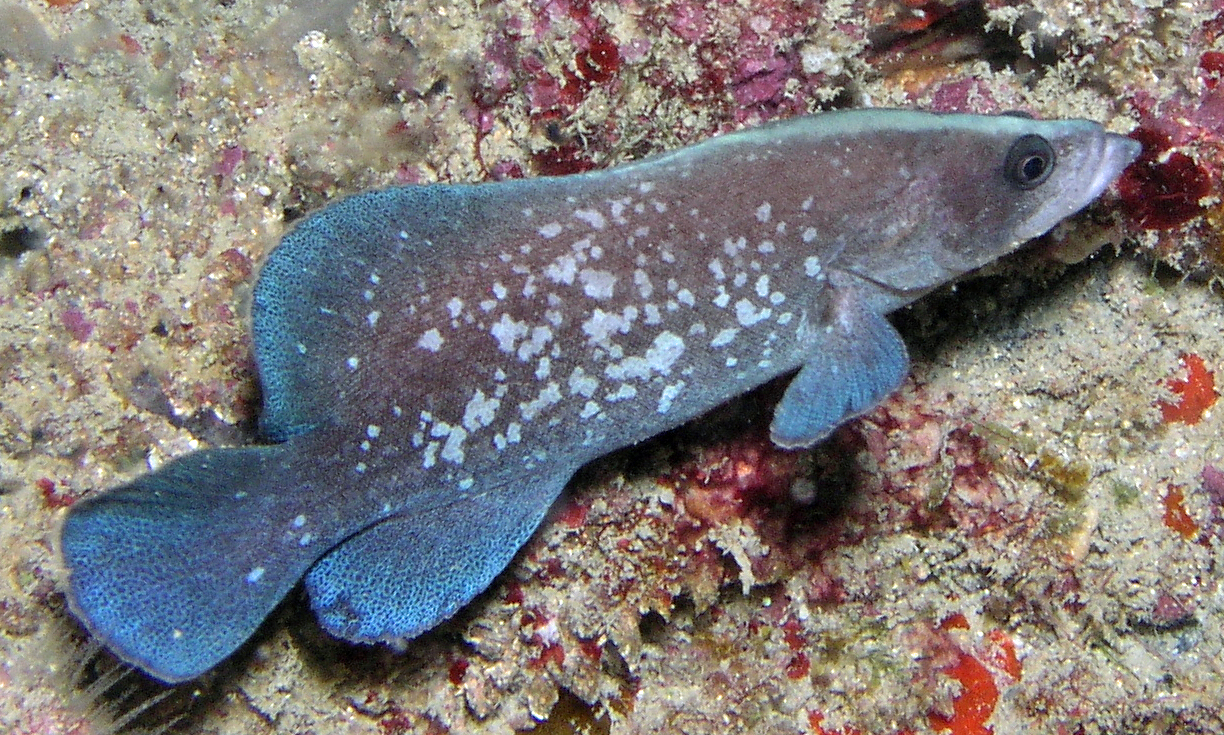

Scientific classification
- Kingdom: Animalia
- Phylum: Chordata
- Class: Actinopterygii
- Division: Teleostei
- Order: Perciformes
- Family: Grammistidae
- Genus: Rypticus
- Species: R. bistrispinus

Binomial name
- Rypticus bistrispinus (Mitchill, 1818)

= Rypticus bistrispinus =

Freckled soapfish

Species of soapfish

Rypticus bistrispinus, also known as the freckled soapfish, is a species of soapfish native to the western Atlantic Ocean. Like other soapfishes, it has glands in its skin that are able to produce an irritating, mildly toxic slime.

== Description ==
R. bistrispinus has a fusiform body shape and can grow to a maximum body length of 15 cm. The body has a dark reddish brown color, with the sides and belly being yellowish or cream. Covering it are dark red-brown spots. It has three spines on the vertical edge of the preopercle.

== Distribution ==
R. bistrispinus is distributed across the western Atlantic Ocean in areas near the Antilles, the Bahamas, Brazil and southern Florida. It is a solitary species inhabiting sandy bottoms strewn with rocks and rubble, rarely being seen in reefs.
