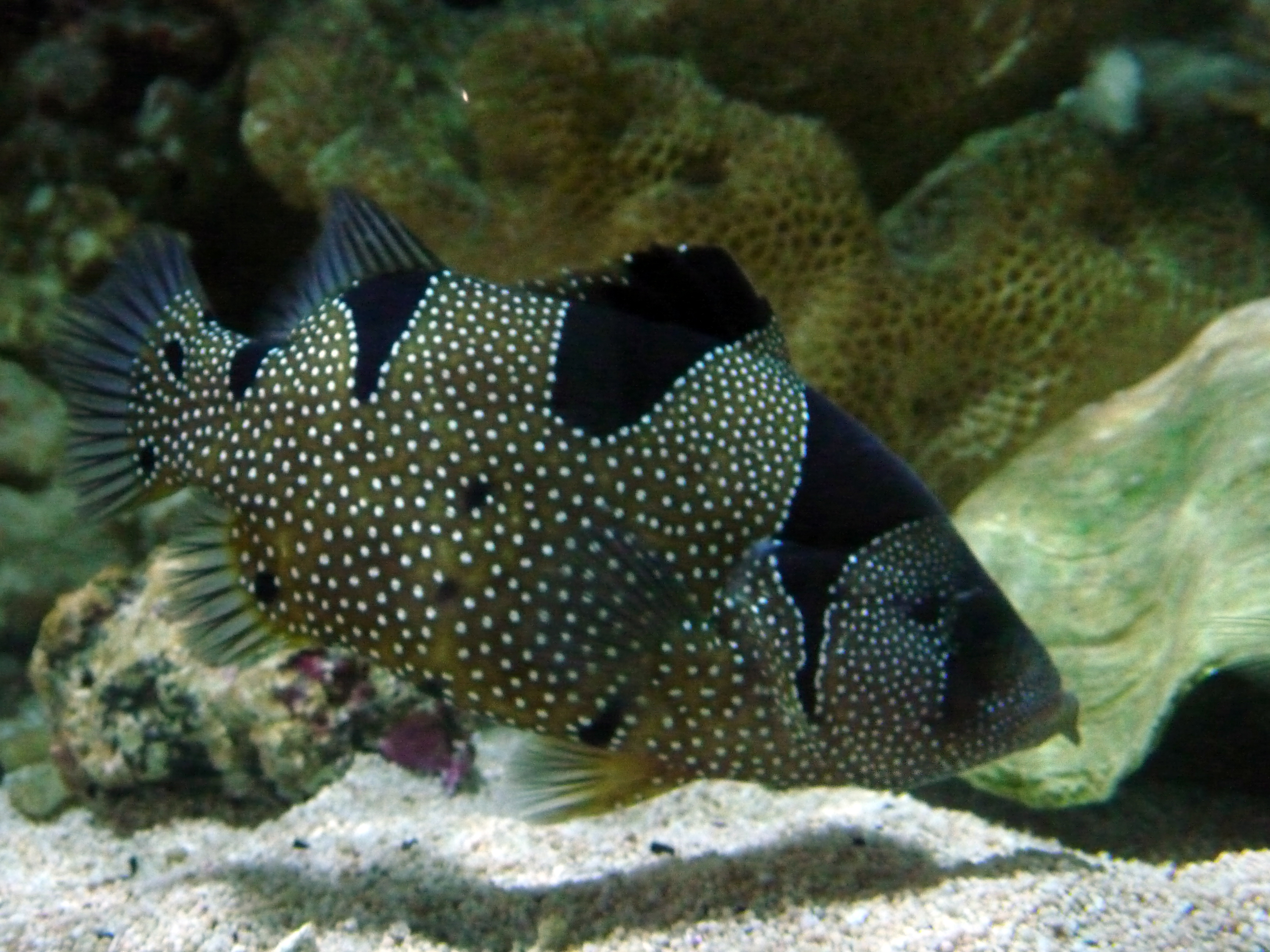

Conservation status
- Least Concern (IUCN 3.1)

Scientific classification
- Kingdom: Animalia
- Phylum: Chordata
- Class: Actinopterygii
- Division: Teleostei
- Order: Perciformes
- Family: Grammistidae
- Genus: Pogonoperca
- Species: P. punctata

Binomial name
- Pogonoperca punctata (Valenciennes, 1830)

Synonyms
- Grammistes punctatus Valenciennes, 1830; Pogonoperca reticulata Bliss, 1883

= Pogonoperca punctata =

Species of fish

Pogonoperca punctata, the spotted soapfish, bearded soapfish, or leaflip grouper, is a species of marine ray-finned fish. Despite the title of “leaflip grouper,” it is not a true grouper, but is a soapfish. It is found in the western Indo-Pacific region.

== Description ==
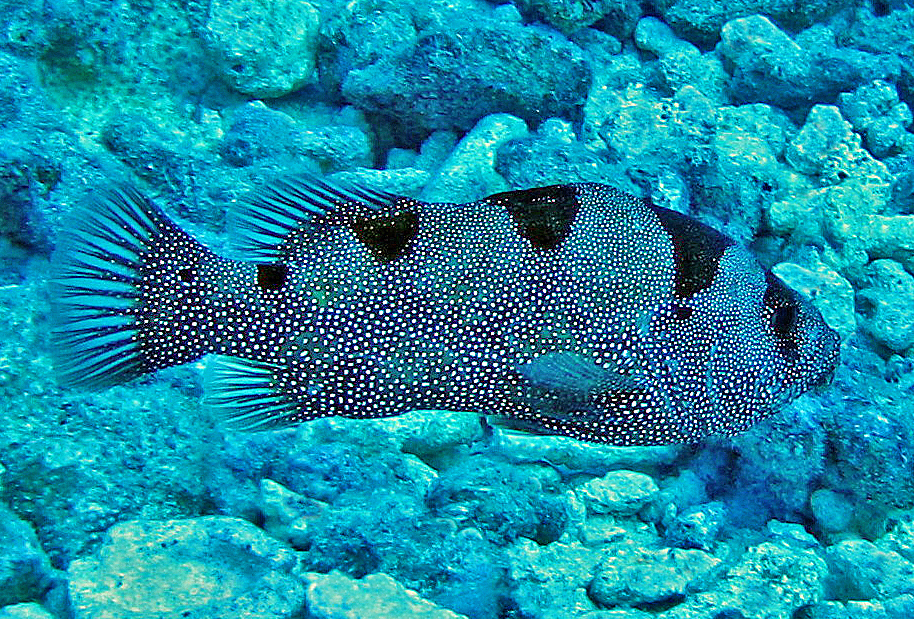
P. punctata from French Polynesia

Pogonoperca punctata has 7 spines in its dorsal fin and 12-13 soft rays with 3 spines and 8 soft rays in the anal fin. The brown body is covered in small white spots, and there is a black vertical bar which runs through the eye and four black saddle-like blotches along the back. There is flap of skin on the lower jaw, which inspires the moniker of “leaflip grouper”. The juveniles have large white spots, which remain as adults but become increasingly obscured by smaller white spots appearing in the grey-coloured regions of the body as the fish matures. The fins are transparent. This species attains a maximum recorded total length of 35 centimetres (14 in).

== Distribution ==
Pogonoperca punctata is found in the western Indo-Pacific from eastern Indonesia east to the Line Islands, Marquesas and the Society Islands, north as far as southern Japan and south to New Caledonia and islands off northern Australia, these being Evans Shoal in the Northern Territory and the eastern Indian Ocean Australian territories of Christmas Island and the Cocos (Keeling) Islands.

== Habitat and biology ==
Pogonoperca punctata is found at depths of 10 to 216 metres (33 to 709 ft). It prefers large coral heads on slopes where there is a moderate current, adults are usually deeper than 20 metres (66 ft) while juveniles occur in shallower more sheltered waters such as lagoons and bays. They are nocturnal hunters feeding on benthic crustaceans and smaller fishes. The juveniles are mimics of venomous blennies. They secrete the toxin grammistin in their skin and, like other soapfish. may do so when stressed.

== Taxonomy ==
Pogonoperca punctata was first formally described as Grammistes punctatus in 1830 by the French zoologist Achille Valenciennes (1794-1865) with the type locality given as Vanikoro Island in the Santa Cruz Islands of the Solomon Islands.

== Utlisation ==
Pogonoperca punctata appears in the aquarium trade. It occasionally appears in fish markets.
