= Weh Island =

Island in Aceh, Indonesia

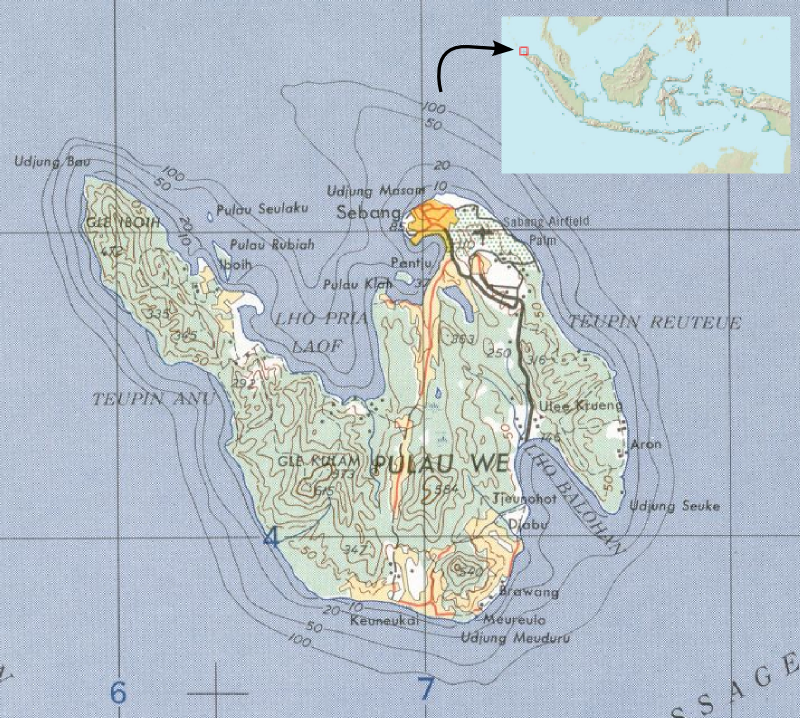
- Map of Weh Island

Highest point
- Elevation: 630 m (2,070 ft)
- Listing: Spesial Ribu
- Coordinates: 5.82°N 95.28°E

Geography
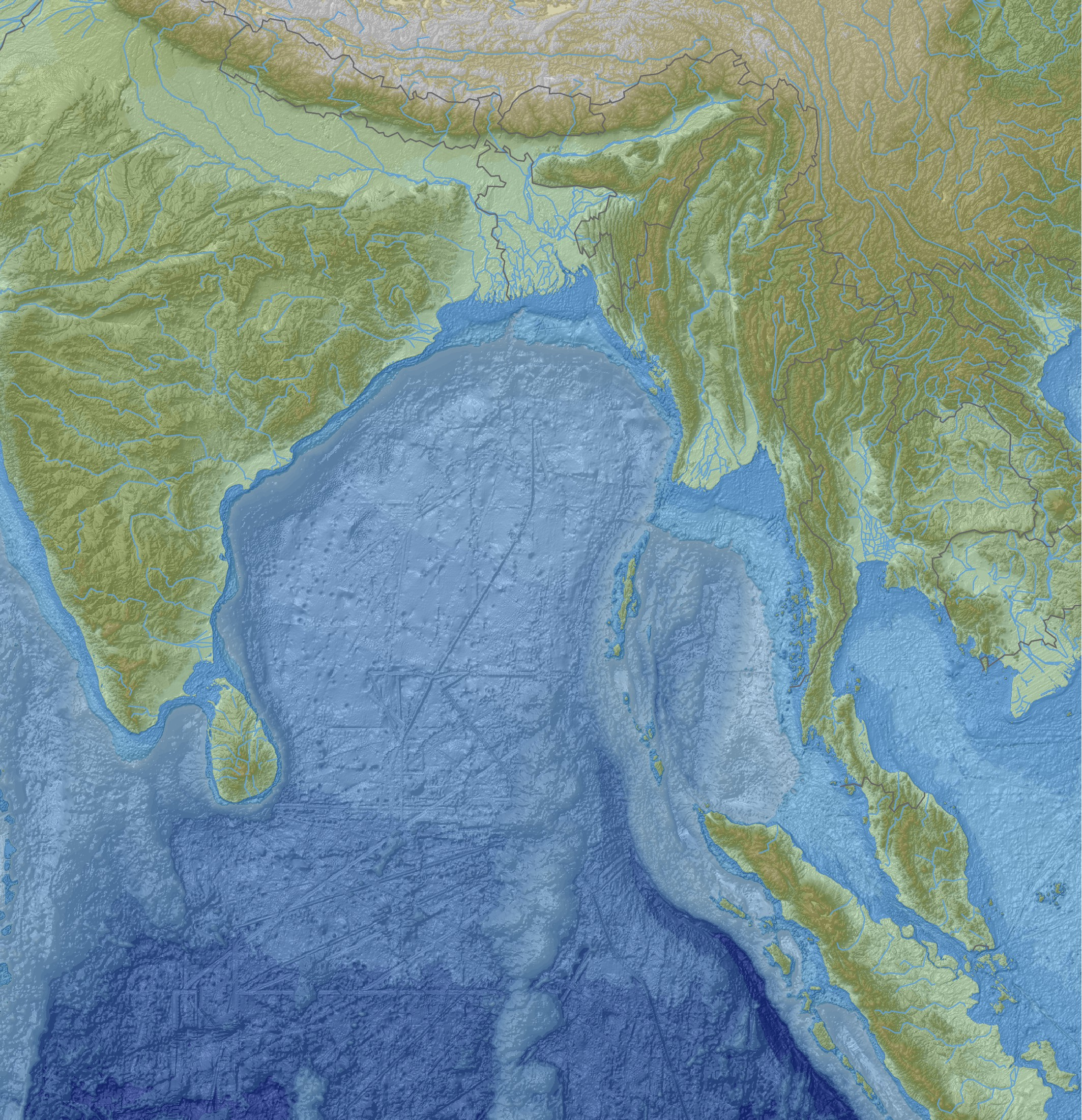
- Location within Sumatra Location within Bay of Bengal
- Location: northwest of Sumatra, Indonesia

Geology
- Mountain type: Stratovolcano
- Volcanic arc: Sunda Arc
- Last eruption: Pleistocene time

Weh Island
Native name: Pulo Wèh
- Interactive map of Weh Island

Geography
- Location: Andaman Sea
- Archipelago: Malay Archipelago
- Area: 122.13 km^{2} (47.15 sq mi)
- Highest elevation: 630 m (2070 ft)
- Highest point: Mount Cot Kulam

Administration
- Indonesia
- Region: Sumatera
- Province: Aceh
- Municipality: Sabang City

Demographics
- Population: 43,527 (mid 2023 estimate)
- Pop. density: 356.4/km^{2} (923.1/sq mi)
- Ethnic groups: Acehnese

Weh Island (Indonesian: Pulau Weh, Acehnese: Pulo Wèh) is a small active volcanic island to the northwest of Sumatra in Indonesia, also known as Sabang after the city situated on the northeast end of the island, whose area of 122.13 square kilometres (47.15 sq mi) includes the whole island as well as several offshore islets. It had a population of 43,527 at the official mid-2023 estimate. It is 45 minutes by fast regular ship or 2 hours by ferry from the mainland port of Banda Aceh. It was originally connected to the Sumatran mainland and became separated by sea after the stratovolcano's last eruption in the Pleistocene era. The island is situated in the Andaman Sea.

The island is known for its ecosystem; the Indonesian government has declared 60 square kilometres (23 sq mi) of inland and sea around the island as a wildlife protection area. A rare megamouth shark species was found on shore and the island is the only habitat for the threatened toad, Duttaphrynus valhallae (formerly Bufo valhallae). Coral reef areas around the island are known for their large variety of fish species.

== Geography ==
Weh Island is located in the Andaman Sea, where two groups of islands, the Nicobar Islands and Andaman Islands, are scattered in one line from Sumatra to the north up to the Burma Plate. The Andaman Sea lies on an active moving small tectonic plate (microplate). A complex geological fault system and volcanic arc islands have been created along the length of the sea by the movement of the microplate.

The island lies about 15 kilometres (9 mi) off the northernmost tip of Sumatra. The island is small at only 121 km^{2} (46.7 sq mi), but mountainous. The highest peak, Cot Kulam, is a fumarolic volcano, 617 metres (2,024 ft) high. The last known eruption is estimated to have occurred in the Pleistocene age, as a result which the mountain partially collapsed and was filled by the sea, forming a separate island.

At a depth of 9 metres (30 ft), close to Sabang city, underwater fumaroles emerge from the seabed. At Gapang Beach, one hour west of Balohan Port, there are also underwater fumaroles which are suitable for diving and are called Hydrothermal Point. A volcanic cone is found in the jungle. There are three solfatara (mudpot) fields on the island: one is 750 metres (0.5 mi) southeast of the summit and the others are 5 kilometres (3 mi) and 11.5 kilometres (7 mi) northwest of the summit, on the western shore of Lhok Perialakot bay.

There are four islets surrounding Weh Island: Klah, Rubiah, Seulako, and Rondo. Among those, Rubiah is well known for diving tourism, because of its coral reefs. When traveling to Saudi Arabia was only possible by sea, Rubiah was used as a place of quarantine for Indonesian Muslims during the Hajj pilgrimage season.

== Inhabitants ==
Weh Island is a part of Aceh province. A 1993 census reported 24,700 inhabitants. The large majority of the population are Acehnese and the remaining are Minangkabau, Javanese, Batak and Chinese. It is unknown when the island was first inhabited. Islam is the main religion, as Aceh is a special province where Sharia law has been applied exclusively for the province. However, there are some Christians and Buddhists on the island. They are mostly Javanese, Batak and Chinese.

On 26 December 2004, a 9.1–9.3 M_{w} undersea earthquake struck in the Andaman Sea. The earthquake triggered a series of tsunamis that killed at least 130,000 people in Indonesia alone. The effect on the island was relatively small, but it is unknown how many of its inhabitants were killed in the disaster.

== Economy ==
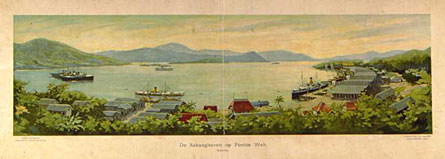
Painting of Sabang port in 1910

The economy on Weh Island was dominated by agriculture. The main products were cloves and coconuts. Small-scale fisheries operate in the area, and fishermen have used explosives and cyanide fishing extensively. Therefore, since 1982, a wildlife protection area (suaka alam) has been declared by the Indonesian government that includes 34 square kilometres (13 sq mi) inland and 26 square kilometres (10 sq mi) of surrounding sea. As of 2021, Sabang city's economy and consequently the island itself has since diversified with much of it being dominated by construction, trading, and service sectors.

Each year, 50,000 vessels pass through Malacca Strait. In 2000, the Indonesian government declared Sabang a Free Trade Zone and Free Port, to gain economic benefits by establishing the port as a logistic hub for international vessels passing through the strait. Infrastructures for a deep water harbour, port, warehousing and refuelling facilities, were developed. Weh Island is served by the Maimun Saleh Airport located in Sabang, which has scheduled light aircraft flights to Sultan Iskandarmuda Airport in Banda Aceh. Ferries depart from Ulee Lheu, close to the center of Banda Aceh, to Balohan, Pulau Weh's ferry harbour.

Weh Island is also known for ecotourism. Underwater diving, hiking through the volcanic mountain and beach resorts are the main attractions. A small village, Iboih, is known as a location for scuba diving. A few meters from Iboih is the Rubiah islet that is known for its coral reefs. There are also several dive operators in Gapang.

== Ecosystem ==
During 1997–1999, Conservation International conducted a survey of the coral reef in the area. According to the survey, the coral diversity is relatively low, but fish species variation is rich. Some species found during the survey include Pogonoperca ocellata, Chaetodon gardneri, Chaetodon xanthocephalus, Centropyge flavipectoralis, Genicanthus caudovittatus, Halichoeres cosmetus, Stethojulis albovittatus, Scarus enneacanthus, Scarus scaber and Zebrasoma desjardinii.

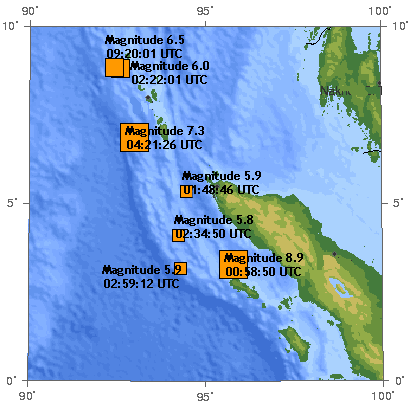
Earthquakes around Aceh and Andaman Sea in 2004

On 13 March 2004, a specimen of a rare and unusual species of shark, megamouth shark, was washed ashore on Gapang beach. The megamouth shark has a distinctive large mouth, very short snout and is broadly rounded in dorsal view. The specimen is said to be the 21st (some say it is the 23rd) sighting of the species since its discovery in 1976. The male shark, measuring 1.7 metres (5.6 ft) in length and weighing 13.82 kg (30.5 pounds), was frozen and sent to the Indonesian Institute of Sciences (LIPI) for further scientific study. As of 2006, there have only been 36 findings of megamouth sharks in the Pacific, Indian and Atlantic oceans.

The 2004 Indian Ocean earthquake and tsunami affected the island's ecosystem. At Iboih village, a large swath of mangrove was destroyed. Debris from the land was deposited on the nearby reefs as a result of the tsunami. In 2005, about 14,400 mangrove seedlings were replanted to save the mangrove forest.

Apart from underwater ecosystem, Weh island is the only habitat of one threatened species of toad, Duttaphrynus valhallae (formerly Bufo valhallae). The species is only known from the holotype from the island. Due to heavy deforestation on the island, the survival of the species is uncertain.

== Sabang International Regatta ==
The Sabang International Regatta was held on September 13 to 25, 2011. The participants were expected from Australia, United States, England, Germany, Malaysia, Singapore, Thailand and Hong Kong.

== Tourism ==
There is no public transport on the island, so tourists need to hire a driver or rent a vehicle to see the island.

- Anoi Itam Beach, with its black sandy beach, is a half-hour drive from Balohan Port. For a small fee, a visitor can enter Anoi Itam Resort.
- Gapang Beach is 17 miles (27 km) from Sabang or a 45-minute drive and is convenient for backpackers with white sandy beach, modest culinary stalls and accommodations. There are several diving resorts.
- Iboih Beach, 5 km (3 mi) from Gapang Beach is the busiest beach in Weh Island. The white sandy beach itself is only 150 metres (492 ft) long, with Rubiah Island directly offshore from it.

== See also ==
- List of volcanoes in Indonesia
