= Pseudogramma xantha =

Scientific classification
- Kingdom: Animalia
- Phylum: Chordata
- Class: Actinopterygii
- Order: Perciformes
- Family: Grammistidae
- Genus: Pseudogramma
- Species: P. xantha

Binomial name
- Pseudogramma xantha Randall, Baldwin, and Williams, 2002

Synonyms
- Pseudogramma australis australis Randall and Baldwin, 1997

Species of ray-finned fish

Pseudogramma xantha, the yellow podge, is a species of marine ray-finned fish in the family Grammistidae, native to the western and south Pacific.
