= Jaboi =

Mountain in Weh Island, Indonesia

Mount Jaboi
- Location within Sumatra

Highest point
- Elevation: 200 m (660 ft)
- Coordinates: 5°49′40″N 95°17′30″E

Geography
- Location: Weh Island, Aceh, Indonesia

Geology
- Mountain type: Volcano (inactive)
- Volcanic arc: Sunda Arc
- Last eruption: Unknown

Jaboi or Jaboi Volcano (indonesian: Gunung Api Jaboi) is located in Jaboi Village, Sukajaya District, Weh Island, Aceh, about 15 kilometers from Sabang City. This mountain is an active volcano with a height of about 200 meters above sea level (masl). Although still active, this mountain is a popular natural tourist destination in Sabang.

== Etymology ==
The name "Jaboi" itself comes from the name of the village where the mountain is located, Jaboi in Sukajaya District, Sabang.

== Description ==
Mount Jaboi's crater area is marked by white rocks and sulfur deposits, creating a barren landscape. Dead trees are also present around the crater. Climbers are advised to bring masks because the smell of volcanic gases such as sulfur dioxide and carbon dioxide is quite pungent. Hot springs with water temperatures above 40 degrees Celsius (104 degrees Fahrenheit) are present, which attract many visitors for therapeutic tourism.
