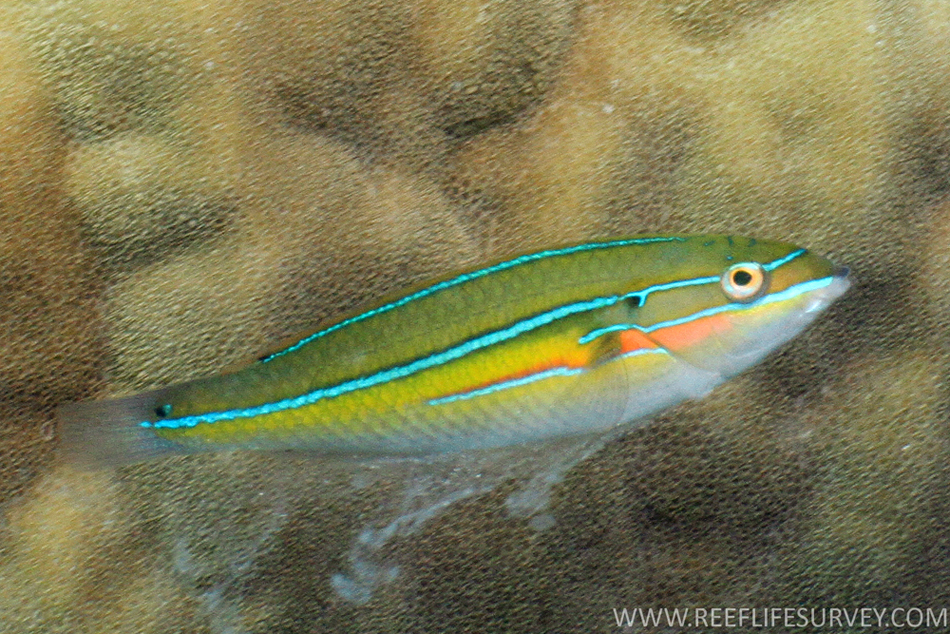
- male Stethojulis strigiventer
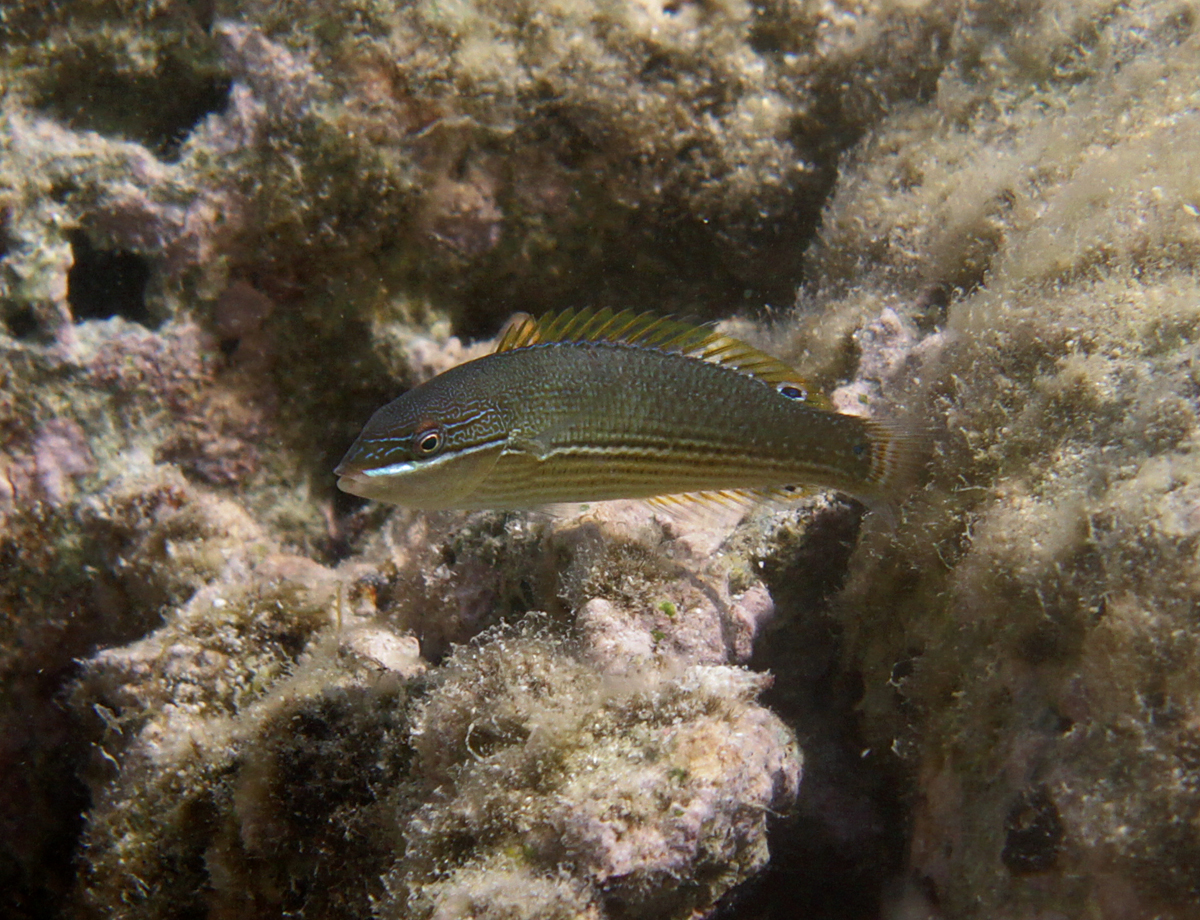
- female Stethojulis strigiventer

Conservation status
- Least Concern (IUCN 3.1)

Scientific classification
- Kingdom: Animalia
- Phylum: Chordata
- Class: Actinopterygii
- Order: Labriformes
- Family: Labridae
- Genus: Stethojulis
- Species: S. strigiventer

Binomial name
- Stethojulis strigiventer (Bennett, 1833)

Synonyms
- Julis strigiventer Bennett, 1833; Julis renardi Bleeker, 1851; Stethojulis renardi (Bleeker, 1851); Stethojulis psacas Jordan & Snyder, 1902

= Stethojulis strigiventer =

Species of fish

Stethojulis strigiventer, also known as the three-ribbon wrasse, silverstreak wrasse, silverbelly wrasse, lined rainbowfish or silver-streaked rainbowfish, is a species of marine ray-finned fish, a wrasse from the family Labridae. This species occurs in beds of seagrass and areas of inner reefs and shallow lagoons where there is a substrate consisting of mixed sand, rubble, and algae. It is found in small groups which swim over large areas down as deep as 20 metres (66 ft). The range of this species extends from the Red Sea southwards along the eastern coast of Africa to Algoa Bay in KwaZulu-Natal, South Africa and eastwards to the Marshall and Tuamotu islands, it also extends north to Honshu and south to New South Wales. This species was first formally described as Julis strigiventer in 1833 by the English zoologist Edward Turner Bennett (1797-1836) with the type locality given as Mauritius. When Albert Günther created the genus Stethojulis he designated Julis strigiventer as the type species.
