= Charles Marcus Breder Jr. =

American ichthyologist (1897-1983)

Charles Marcus Breder Jr. (June 25, 1897 – October 28, 1983) was an American ichthyologist, aquarium manager and museum curator.

Breder was born in Jersey City, New Jersey and grew up in Newark, New Jersey. He did not attend university but managed to be appointed as a scientific assistant in the U. S. Bureau of Fisheries in 1919, Breder later said that all of his knowledge of biology and ichthyology had been gained at the Newark Public Library. Breder's only university level qualification was an honorary doctorate from the University of Newark.

After two years at the Fisheries Bureau he left for a position as an aquarist at the New York Aquarium, where he remained despite conflict over the aquarium's role in research with its director, Charles Haskins Townsend and while there heparticiupated in field expeditions to Panama, Florida, the Bahamas, Mexico, the Sargasso Sea and the Caribbean. It was during this period that Breder devised a technique for keeping the seawater in the aquarium at the correct pH for marine fish at sites with no access-to fresh seawater, this involved additions of sodium bicarbonate to the water at set periods. Townsend retired in 1937 and Breder was appointed as the aquarium's acting director, being confirmed as the director in 1940. Especially later in his career Breder avoided participating in Scientific Societies, although he did serve as president of the American Society of Ichthyologists and Herpetologists in 1932. In 1941 he became a visiting professor and the director of a graduate course at New York University.

In 1944, Breder became the chairman of the Department of Fishes and Aquatic Invertebrates at the American Museum of Natural History, appointed by Albert Eide Parr, who had a short stint working under Breder at the aquarium when he first arrived in the U.S. from Norway. Breder spent the rest of his career with the Museum and was also director of the Lerner Marine Laboratory on Bimini in the Bahamas from 1947 to 1957. From 1957 he lived and worked in Florida either at his own private laboratory or at the Cape Haze Marine Laboratory, retiring in 1965. In retirement he continued to pursue his scientific interests until he was no longer able to.

Breder was best known for his research on the behavior of fishes, particularly their reproductive and social behaviors, he was also a leading researcher into the evolution of the blind cave characins of Mexico.

Breder died on October 28, 1983 in Englewood, Florida, he married twice and his second wife Priscilla survived him. He had two sons by his first marriage, Charles and Richard.

== Taxa described by him ==
- See Category:Taxa named by Charles Marcus Breder Jr.

== Taxa named in his honor ==
The following taxa were named in Breder's honor:

- Pseudogramma brederi (Hildebrand, 1940)
- Hyporhamphus brederi (Fernández-Yépez, 1948)
