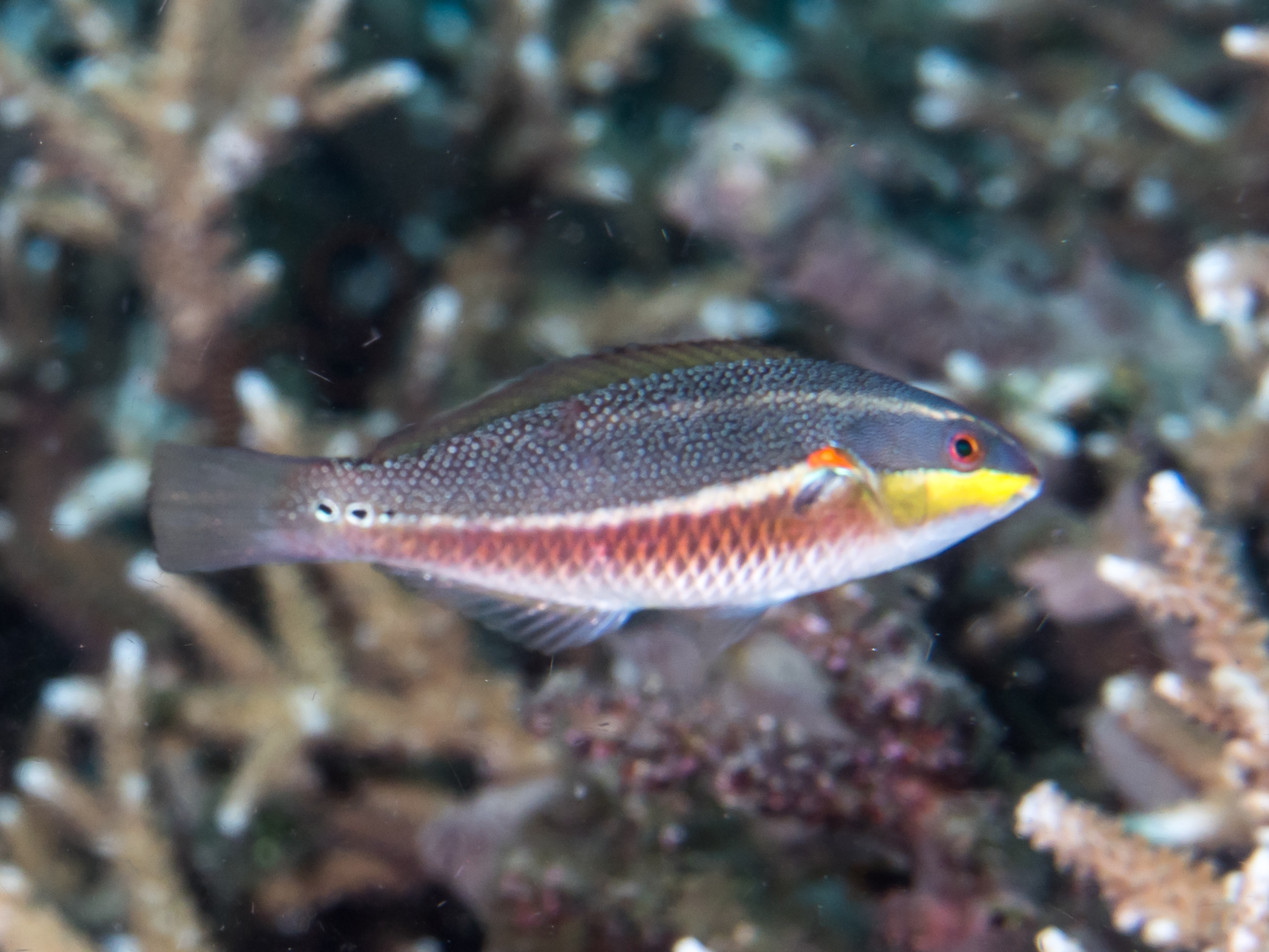
- Stethojulis bandanensis

Conservation status
- Least Concern (IUCN 3.1)

Scientific classification
- Kingdom: Animalia
- Phylum: Chordata
- Class: Actinopterygii
- Order: Labriformes
- Family: Labridae
- Genus: Stethojulis
- Species: S. bandanensis

Binomial name
- Stethojulis bandanensis (Bleeker, 1851)

= Stethojulis bandanensis =

Species of fish

Stethojulis bandanensis, also known as the red-shoulder wrasse, is a species of marine ray-finned fish, a wrasse from the family Labridae. Its range is in East Indian Ocean, Australia, Indonesia, and Indo-Pacific region, where it is associated with reefs.
