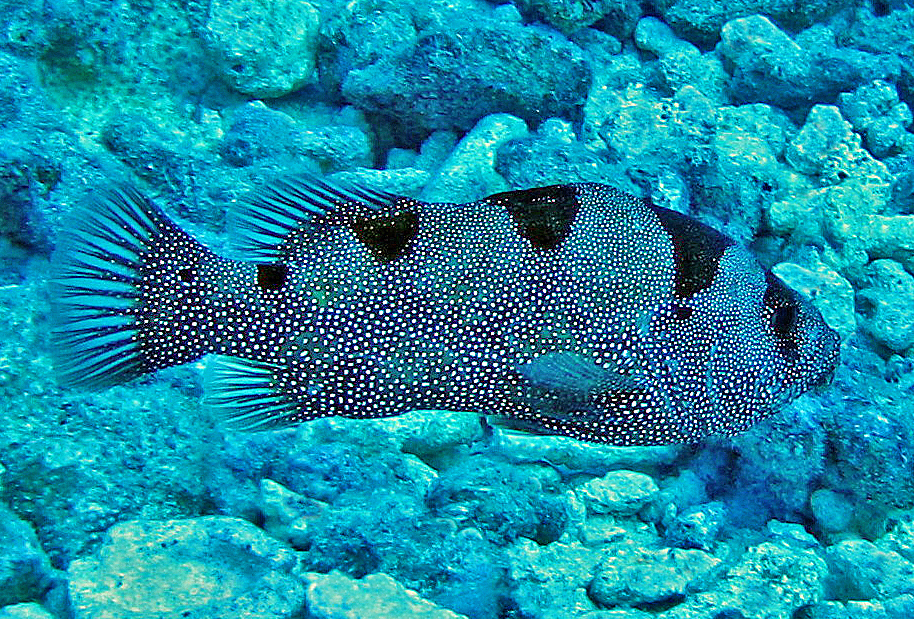
- Pogonoperca punctata

Scientific classification
- Kingdom: Animalia
- Phylum: Chordata
- Class: Actinopterygii
- Order: Perciformes
- Family: Grammistidae
- Genus: Pogonoperca; Günther, 1859

Type species
- Pogonoperca ocellata Günther, 1859

= Pogonoperca =

Genus of fishes

Pogonoperca is a genus of marine ray-finned fish, related to the groupers and classified within the family Grammistidae. They are found in the Indo-Pacific region.

== Etymology ==
The genus name Pogonoperca derives from the Greek (pogon meaning beard and perke meaning perch).

== Species ==
Species within this genus include:

- Pogonoperca ocellata Günther, 1859 (Indian soapfish)
- Pogonoperca punctata (Valenciennes, 1830) (Spotted soapfish)
