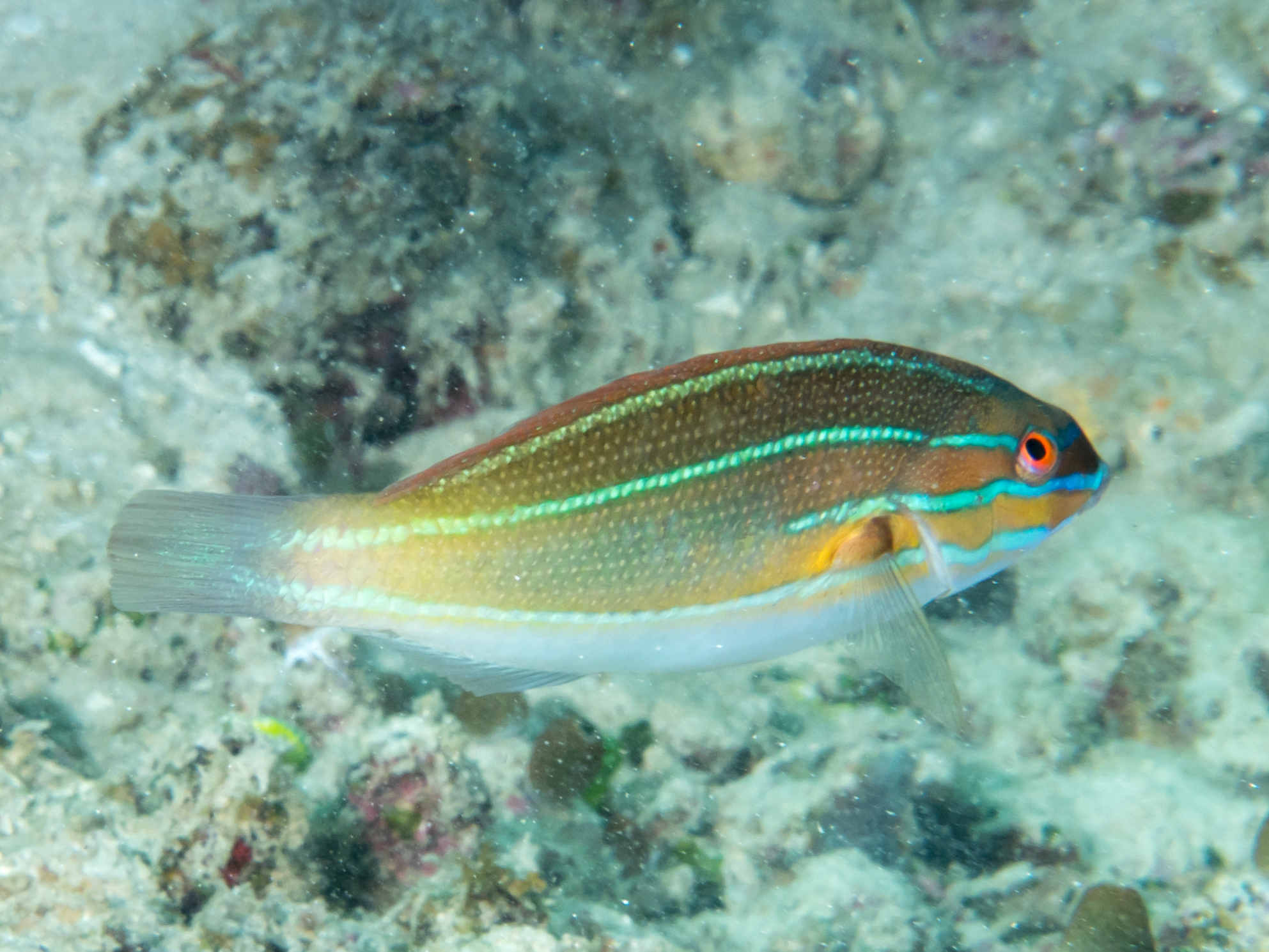
- Stethojulis trilineata

Conservation status
- Least Concern (IUCN 3.1)

Scientific classification
- Kingdom: Animalia
- Phylum: Chordata
- Class: Actinopterygii
- Order: Labriformes
- Family: Labridae
- Genus: Stethojulis
- Species: S. trilineata

Binomial name
- Stethojulis trilineata (Bloch & Schneider, 1801)

Synonyms
- List: Labrus trilineatus Bloch & Schneider, 1801; Halichoeres trilineata (Bloch & Schneider, 1801); Stethojulis trilineatus (Bloch & Schneider, 1801); Julis sebanus Valenciennes, 1839; Julis phekadopleura Bleeker, 1849; Stethojulis phekadopleura (Bleeker, 1849); Halichoeres sebae Kner, 1860; Stethojulis filholi Sauvage, 1880

= Stethojulis trilineata =

Species of fish

Stethojulis trilineata, also known as the blue-ribbon wrasse, red shouldered rainbow-fish, scarlet-banded rainbowfish, three-blueline wrasse, three-lined rainbowfish or three-lined wrasse, is a species of marine ray-finned fish, a wrasse from the family Labridae. It is found in the Indo-Pacific region where it is associated with reefs.

== Description ==
Stethojulis trilineata is a small species of wrasse which can grow to a total length of 15 centimetres (5.9 in). The initial phase, or female, fish are greenish to brownish-grey and have numerous whitish spots on the upper flanks as well as a dark spot on the caudal peduncle. Fish in the terminal phase, males, show three thin, pale pink stripes running along the body with a fourth stripe starting on the head reaching to above the pectoral fin. The dorsal fin has 9 spines and 11 soft rays while the anal fin has 3 spines and 11 soft rays.

== Distribution ==
Stethojulis trilineata is widespread in the Indo-West Pacific where it is found from Maldives east to Samoa and Palau, north to Tokara Island of Japan and south to Montague Island of Australia.

== Habitat and biology ==
Stethojulis trilineata is found on reefs exposed to currents which have clear water. They are normally found in loose groups over reef crests and drop offs. They spawn in discrete pairs within their small groups, usually of less than 15 individuals. Spawning occurs at various times of the day and does not appear to be influenced by either lunar or tidal effects. It occurs to depths of 20 metres (66 ft).

== Human usage ==
Stethojulis trilineata is found in the aquarium trade and fish have been recorded as being collected and traded in Bali, Taiwan, Sri Lanka and the Solomon Islands.
