= Ocellate soapfish =

Conservation status
- Least Concern (IUCN 3.1)

Scientific classification
- Kingdom: Animalia
- Phylum: Chordata
- Class: Actinopterygii
- Order: Perciformes
- Family: Grammistidae
- Genus: Grammistops; Schultz, 1953
- Species: G. ocellatus

Binomial name
- Grammistops ocellatus Schultz, 1953

Synonyms
- Tulelepis canis J. L. B. Smith, 1954

Species of fish

The ocellate soapfish (Grammistops ocellatus) is a species of marine ray-finned fish with a wide Indo-Pacific distribution. It is the only species in the genus Grammistops. It is also known as the ocellated soapfish, ocellated podge, or false-eyed soapfish. The specific name ocellatus refers to the ocellate (eye-like) spot on the operculum (gill covering).

== Taxonomy ==
Grammistops ocellatus was first formally described in 1953 by the American ichthyologist Leonard Peter Schultz (1901–1986) with the type locality given as the Lagoon at Arji Island, Bikini Atoll in the Marshall Islands. It is related to the groupers, and is classified within the family Grammistidae. As of 2020, it is the only species in the genus Grammistops.

== Description ==
The ocellate soapfish has a body which is moderately elongate with a depth which is less than the length of the head. The body is dull yellowish-brown body and it has similarly coloured fins with a single dark, ocellate (eye-like) spot on the gill cover and a dark brown spot on either side of the chin. The dorsal fin contains 7 spines and 12–13 soft rays while the anal fin has 3 spines and 9 soft rays. It attains a maximum total length of 13.2 cm (5.2 in). The preopercle has a smooth margin with 1 or 2 short spines and the caudal fin is rounded.

== Distribution ==
Grammistops ocellatus has a disjunct Indo-Pacific distribution. It is found in the Indian Ocean off the coast of East Africa from Kenya south to Mozambique and Phuket in Thailand and Christmas Island. In the Pacific Ocean it is found from eastern Indonesia east to the Society Islands, north to the Ryukyu Islands of southern Japan and south as far as Australia, New Caledonia and Tonga.

== Habitat and biology ==
The ocellate soapfish is found on coral heads in lagoons and seaward reefs at depths of 3 to 30 m (9.8 to 98.4 ft). It is a cryptic species which is encountered either solitarily or as pairs. Like other species named "soapfish" this species secretes a skin toxin from epidermal glandular cells when stressed.
