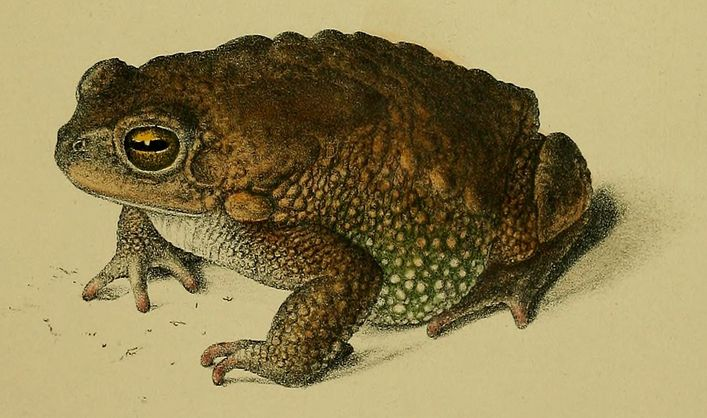
- Illustration in the original species description

Conservation status
- Data Deficient (IUCN 3.1)

Scientific classification
- Kingdom: Animalia
- Phylum: Chordata
- Class: Amphibia
- Order: Anura
- Family: Bufonidae
- Genus: Duttaphrynus
- Species: D. valhallae

Binomial name
- Duttaphrynus valhallae (Meade-Waldo, 1909)

Synonyms
- Bufo valhallae Meade-Waldo, 1909 "1908"

= Duttaphrynus valhallae =

Species of amphibian

Duttaphrynus valhallae is a species of toad in the family Bufonidae. It is endemic to Weh Island, located northwest of Sumatra, Indonesia. Known only from the holotype (more correctly, syntypes), its ecology is unknown, but it is assumed to be a lowland forest species. Practically no forest habitat remains on Weh Island, and it is not known whether the species still persists there. Also its taxonomic validity is uncertain.

== Etymology ==
The specific name valhallae refers to yacht "Valhalla" on which Geoffrey Meade-Waldo was travelling when he encountered the new species.

== Description ==
The syntype, two females, measure about 82 mm (3.2 in) in snout–vent length. They are olive-brown above, with many wrinkles and pores of various sizes. Parotoid glands are large.
