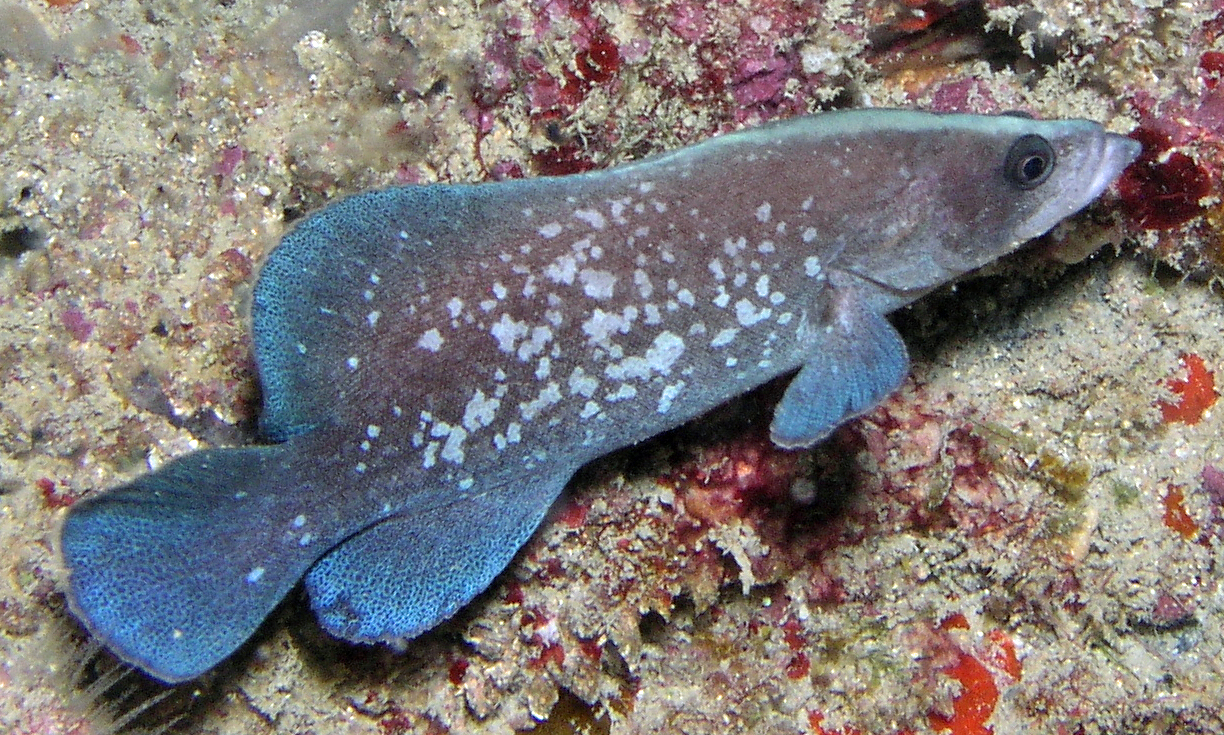
- Rypticus bistrispinus

Scientific classification
- Kingdom: Animalia
- Phylum: Chordata
- Class: Actinopterygii
- Order: Perciformes
- Family: Grammistidae
- Genus: Rypticus; Cuvier & Valenciennes, 1829

Type species
- Anthias saponaceus Bloch & Schneider, 1801

Species
- 10, see text

Synonyms
- Eleutheractis Cope, 1871; Promicropterus Gill, 1861; Smecticus Valenciennes, 1855

= Rypticus =

Genus of fishes

Rypticus is a genus of marine ray-finned fish, related to the groupers and classified within the family Grammistidae. It is one of several genera of soapfishes. These fish live in the Atlantic and eastern Pacific Oceans in tropical and warmer temperate zones.

== Description ==
The genus can be distinguished from the rest of the Serranidae by a few morphological details, such as its lack of anal fin spines. It also has only two to four dorsal fin spines; other serranids have more. The mouth is large and the lower jaw protrudes. The coloration varies, but usually a brown stripe runs from the mouth to the front of the dorsal fin. Several species are distinctly spotted. R. bistrispinus has red-brown spots, R. bornoi and R. subbifrenatus have dark brown, rounded spots, R. maculatus has white spots, R. bicolor and R. courtenayi have many rounded, pale cream spots, and R. nigripinnis has ocellated (eye-like) spots, while R. randalli is more blotchy than spotted.

== Biology ==
Like many other soapfishes, Rysticus species secrete large amounts of toxic mucus from their skin in response to stress. The toxin, grammistin, repels predators.

Rypticus species are nocturnal, feeding at night on crustaceans, molluscs, and fish.

These fish are protogynous hermaphrodites, with females able to change sex to male. This is not uncommon among the serranids. Rypticus is unique, though, in that a fish has both male and female reproductive tissues which are separate on the cellular level, but are wrapped around each other in the gonad.

== Ecology ==
Most species live around islands and along the continental shelves. R. nigripinnis and R. randalli can tolerate lower salinities than many serranids, and they are known to inhabit estuaries.

== Taxonomy ==
Ten species in this genus are known. The latest, R. carpenteri, was described in 2012.

Species include:

- Rypticus africanus (Sampaio, Rocha & Ferreira)
- Rypticus bicolor (Valenciennes, 1846) (mottled soapfish)
- Rypticus bistrispinus (Mitchill, 1818) Freckled soapfish
- Rypticus bornoi Beebe & Tee-Van, 1928 (Largespotted soapfish)
- Rypticus carpenteri Baldwin & Weigt, 2012 (Slope soapfish)
- Rypticus courtenayi McArtney, 1979 (Socorran soapfish)
- Rypticus maculatus Holbrook, 1855 (white-spotted soapfish)
- Rypticus nigripinnis Gill, 1861 (blackfin soapfish)
- Rypticus randalli Courtenay, 1967 (plain soapfish)
- Rypticus saponaceus (Bloch & Schneider, 1801) (greater soapfish)
- Rypticus subbifrenatus Gill, 1861 (spotted soapfish)

== Conservation ==
R. courtenayi has the narrowest distribution, being endemic to the Revillagigedo Islands of Mexico. Its range is only about 25 km^{2}. It is listed as a vulnerable species by the IUCN.
