= Suttonia =

Scientific classification
- Kingdom: Animalia
- Phylum: Chordata
- Class: Actinopterygii
- Order: Perciformes
- Family: Grammistidae
- Genus: Suttonia; J. L. B. Smith, 1953

Type species
- Suttonia suttoni J. L. B. Smith, 1953

Genus of fishes

In plants, Suttonia is a junior synonym of the colicwood genus, Myrsine.

Suttonia is a genus of marine ray-finned fish, related to the groupers and classified within the family Grammistidae.

== Species ==
There are currently 3 recognized species in this genus:

- Suttonia coccinea Endo & Kenmotsu, 2013 (scarlet freckle-faced podge)
- Suttonia lineata Gosline, 1960 (freckleface podge)
- Suttonia suttoni J. L. B. Smith, 1953
