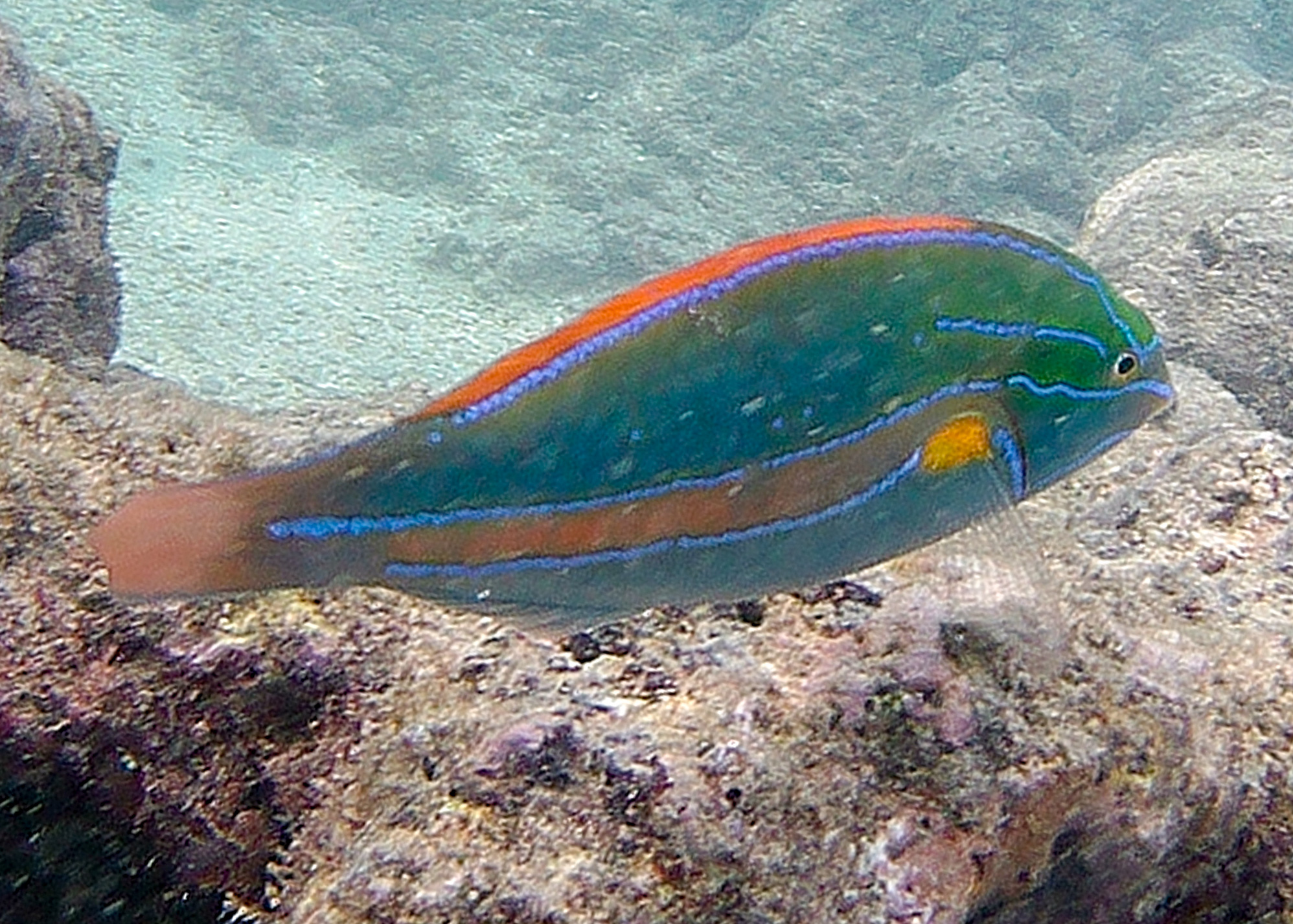

Scientific classification
- Kingdom: Animalia
- Phylum: Chordata
- Class: Actinopterygii
- Order: Labriformes
- Family: Labridae
- Genus: Stethojulis
- Species: S. balteata

Binomial name
- Stethojulis balteata (Quoy & Gaimard, 1824)

Synonyms
- Hinalea axillaris (Quoy & Gaimard, 1824); Hinalea balteata (Quoy & Gaimard, 1824); Julis axillaris Quoy & Gaimard, 1824; Julis balteatus Quoy & Gaimard, 1824; Stethojulis axillaris (Quoy & Gaimard, 1824)

= Belted wrasse =

Species of fish

The belted wrasse (Stethojulis balteata) is a species of wrasse in the family Labridae, endemic to the Hawaiian Islands. It was originally named Stethojulis axillaris by Quoy and Gaimard in 1824. In Hawaiian, this species is known as ʻOmaka, although it may also be referred to as hīnālea or alea, for wrasse.

== Description ==
The species can easily be identified by its bright colors and distinct pattern. It is a light green color, with blue lines running parallel across its body and an orange spiny dorsal fin. It also has a thicker, orange stripe that runs in between the blue lines, from the pectoral fin to the tail. As most reef fish, the Belted Wrasse is relatively small, reaching 6 inches (15 centimeters) in length in full maturity. Wrasses are also sequential hermaphrodites, meaning they can change sex during their lifespan.

== Distribution and habitat ==
The belted wrasse is native to the Hawaiian Islands, but can also found in the reefs of the Johnston Atoll, 825 miles from Honolulu. This species typically inhabits shallow reefs, although it can be seen in outer reefs up to 50 feet (15 meters) deep. Belted Wrasses are benthopelagic, meaning they live at the bottom of the sea, near corals and algae beds. The ʻOmaka buries itself in sand at night, which is a common pattern seen across Wrasses. They feed on small invertebrates such as bivalves, polychaetes, sipuncula, and gastropods. They may also ingest organic waste from dead crustaceans and fish.

== Human use and cultural significance ==
Although this species may be kept in aquariums, it is highly advised not to. Wrasses are skittery by nature, and they can jump out of an aquarium if left uncovered. The ʻOmaka is not considered a food source, but it may have been for Hawaiians before the arrival of missionaries. Native Hawaiians would typically catch hīnālea by submerging sticks covered in charred oil, which would attract the fish making them easy to catch. This practice was known as melomelo. Another technique they used was known as hinaʻi hoʻoluʻuluʻu. These were baskets made out of ʻāwikiwiki, a native plant, designed to trap fish. Hīnālea were also commonly used as offerings to the gods in ceremonies, although it is not for certain that the ʻomaka was used for this practice.
