= Jeboehlkia =

Conservation status
- Least Concern (IUCN 3.1)

Scientific classification
- Kingdom: Animalia
- Phylum: Chordata
- Class: Actinopterygii
- Order: Perciformes
- Family: Grammistidae
- Genus: Jeboehlkia; Robins, 1967
- Species: J. gladifer

Binomial name
- Jeboehlkia gladifer Robins, 1967

Genus of fishes

Jeboehlkia is a monotypic genus of marine ray-finned fish, related to the groupers and classified within the family Grammistidae. It is a species of relatively deep water which is found in the western Atlantic Ocean. The only species in the genus is Jeboehlkia gladifer, the bladefin bass.

== Description ==
Jeboehlkia gladifer has a moderately elongate and compressed body with a largeeye and pointed snout with a quite large mouth which is slightly oblique and has a projecting lower jaw . The posterior edge of the preopercle has fine serrations and there are three spines on the lower edge which point forwards and three rearward pointing spines on the gill cover, with the middle spine being the longest. The dorsal fin contains eight spines, although the first of these is tiny and hidden and the second is long and blade like, and 9 soft rays. The membranes between the spines and soft rays have deep incisions. The anal fin has three spines and seven soft rays. The caudal fin is rounded. The colour of the head and body is white to pink to reddish with a ref iris and the dorsal part of the head and nape being red. There is a white band which runs along the middle of the head starting at the top lip and ending at the 2nd spine in the dorsal fin and another wide red bar which runs from the soft rayed portion of the dorsal fin vertically on the body onto the anal fin> The anal and dorsal fins have white edges, the pelvic fins are white while the caudal fin is red with a white posterior margin. This fish attains a maximum total length of 7.8 centimetres (3.1 in).

== Distribution ==
Jeboehlkia gladifer is found in the western Atlantic Ocean where it occurs from South Carolina to the southern part of the Caribbean Sea.

== Habitat and biology ==
Jeboehlkia gladifer is a little known species of deep waters at depths of in excess of 150 metres (490 ft). A pelagic larva was collected between 10 and 300 metres (33 and 984 ft) off New York.

== Taxonomy ==
Jeboehlkia gladifer was first formally described in 1967 by the American C. Richard Robins (1928-2020) with the type locality being given as "Caribbean Sea, 16°06'N, 81°10.5'W, Oregon station 4932, depth 90 fathoms". The generic name honours the American ichthyologist James Erwin Böhlke (1930-1982) while the specific name gladifer means "sword bearing" in Latin and refers to the blade like spine in the dorsal fin. J. gladifer is the only species in the genus, Robins placed this genus as being close to the genus Liopropoma but later workers suggest that it is placed in the tribe Grammistini.

== Utilisation ==
Jeboehlkia gladifer has been collected and marketed for the aquarium trade, albeit with a very high price tag.
