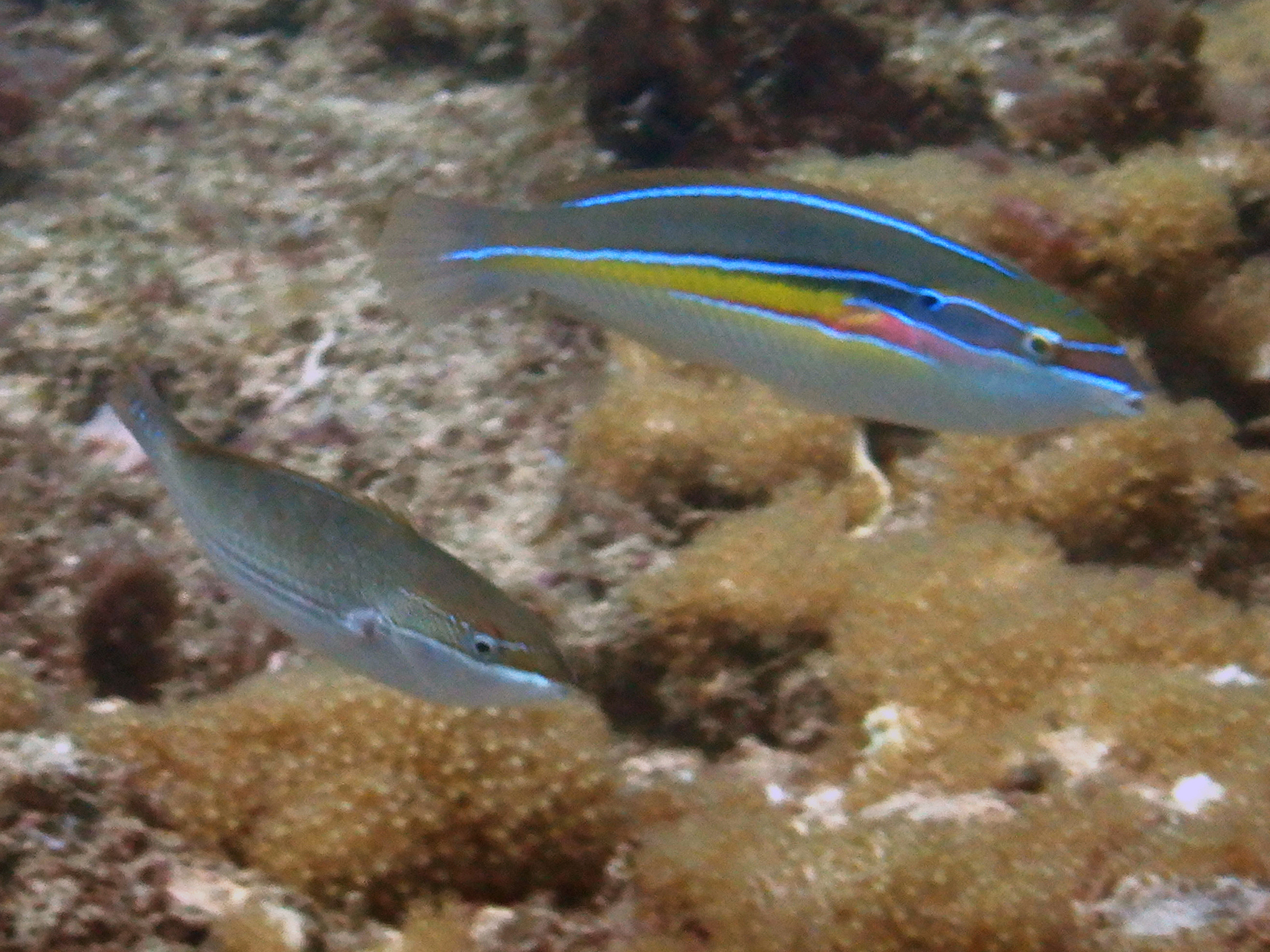
- Stethojulis strigiventer Initial and terminal phase

Scientific classification
- Kingdom: Animalia
- Phylum: Chordata
- Class: Actinopterygii
- Order: Labriformes
- Family: Labridae
- Subfamily: Julidinae
- Genus: Stethojulis; Günther, 1861

Type species
- Julis strigiventer E. T. Bennett, 1833

Synonyms
- Hinalea D. S. Jordan & E. K. Jordan, 1922; Rhytejulis Fowler & B. A. Bean, 1928

= Stethojulis =

Genus of fishes

Stethojulis is a genus of wrasses native to the Indian and Pacific Oceans.

== Species ==
The currently recognized species in this genus are:

Species	Common name	Image
Stethojulis albovittata (Bonnaterre, 1788)	blue-lined wrasse	
Stethojulis balteata (Quoy & Gaimard, 1824)	belted wrasse	
Stethojulis bandanensis (Bleeker, 1851)	red-shoulder wrasse	
Stethojulis interrupta (Bleeker, 1851)	cutribbon wrasse	
Stethojulis maculata P. J. Schmidt, 1931		
Stethojulis marquesensis J. E. Randall, 2000		
Stethojulis notialis J. E. Randall, 2000		
Stethojulis strigiventer (E. T. Bennett, 1833)	three-ribbon wrasse	
Stethojulis terina D. S. Jordan & Snyder, 1902		
Stethojulis trilineata (Bloch & J. G. Schneider, 1801)	three-lined rainbowfish	
