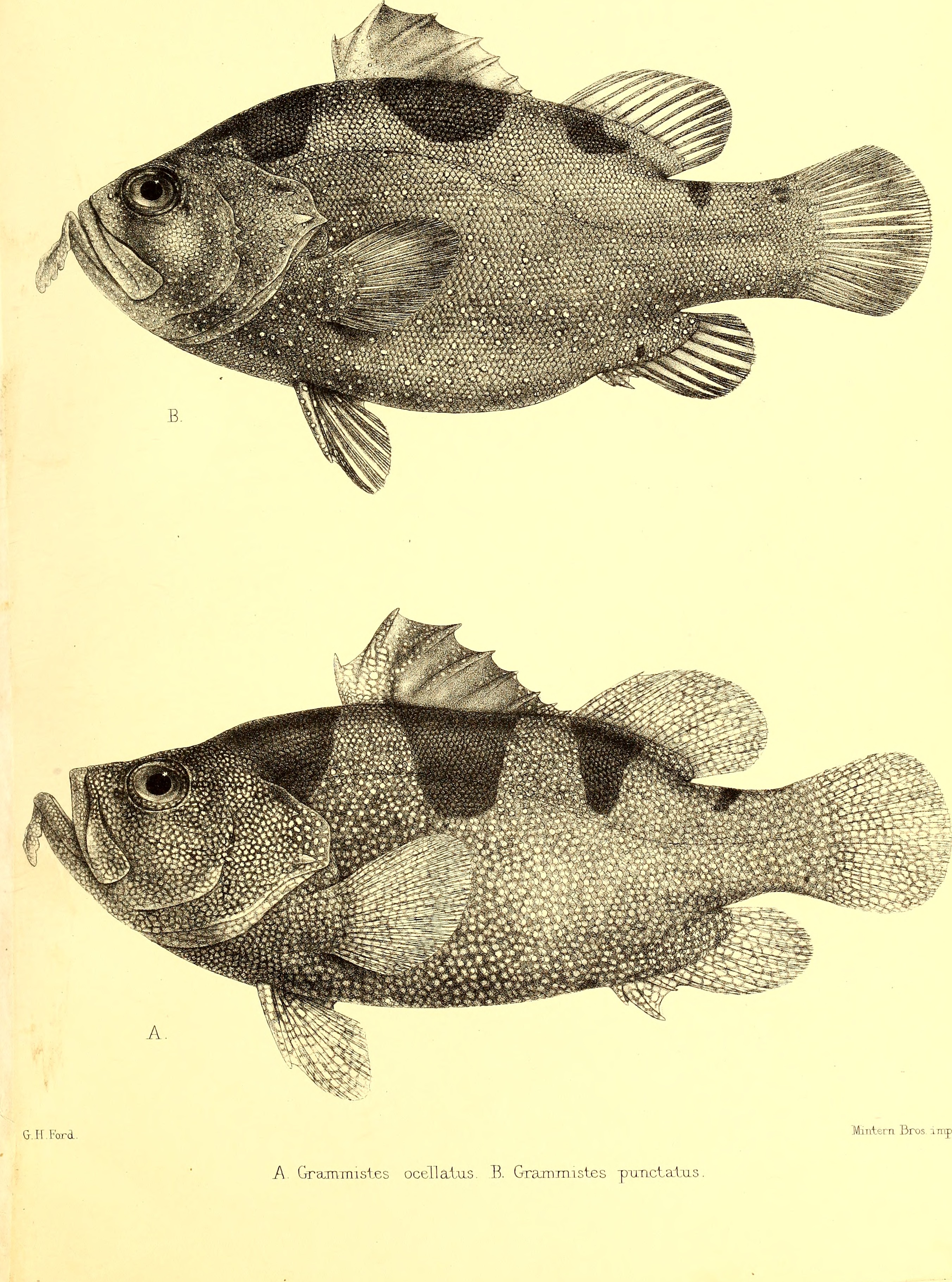
- top

Conservation status
- Least Concern (IUCN 3.1)

Scientific classification
- Kingdom: Animalia
- Phylum: Chordata
- Class: Actinopterygii
- Order: Perciformes
- Family: Grammistidae
- Genus: Pogonoperca
- Species: P. ocellata

Binomial name
- Pogonoperca ocellata Günther, 1859

Synonyms
- Grammistes ocellatus (Günther, 1859); Grammiste comprimé Liénard, 1832; Grammistes compressus Liénard, 1834

= Pogonoperca ocellata =

Species of fish

Pogonoperca ocellata, the Indian soapfish or snowflake soapfish, is a species of marine ray-finned fish, related to the groupers and classified within the subfamily Epinephelinae of the family Serranidae. It is found in the Indian Ocean.

== Description ==
Pogonoperca ocellata has a relatively deep body with the head length being less than the depth. They are characterisedby having a flap of skin at the tip of their chin, the flap being shorter than the diameter of the eye. The caudal fin is rounded and the lateral line extends on to its base. There are 8 spines and 12-13 soft rays in the dorsal fin and 3 spines and 8 soft rays in the anal fin. The overall colour of the body is brown but this is partially covered with closely set white spots which create reticulations which extend onto thee fins. There are five black saddle like botches along the back, the first runs through the eye, the second is on the nape and the third to the fifth are along the dorsal part of the body. The spiny part of the dorsal fin is yellow. There is also an obvious but small black blotch on the upper part of the base of the caudal fin. This species attains a maximum recorded fish measurement total length of 30 centimetres (12 in)>

== Distribution ==
Pogonoperca ocellata is an uncommon but widely distributed species in the Indian Ocean and marginally in the Western Pacific Ocean. It is found in Mauritius, Réunion, Seychelles, Maldives, Andaman Islands, Vietnam and Indonesia.

== Habitat and biology ==
Pogonoperca ocellata is found in relatively deep water, at depths greater than 25 metres (82 ft) where there are coral and rocky reefs.

== Taxonomy ==
Pogonoperca ocellata was first formally described in 1859 by the German-born British zoologist Albert Günther (1830-1914) with the type locality not given. However, Mauritius is stated to be the type locality. When Günther described P. ocellata it was as the only species in the new genus Pogonoperca and it is, therefore, the type species of that genus.

== Utilisation ==
Pogonoperca ocellata is not utilised commercially but is occasionally caught by hand line fisheries in the Seychelles.
