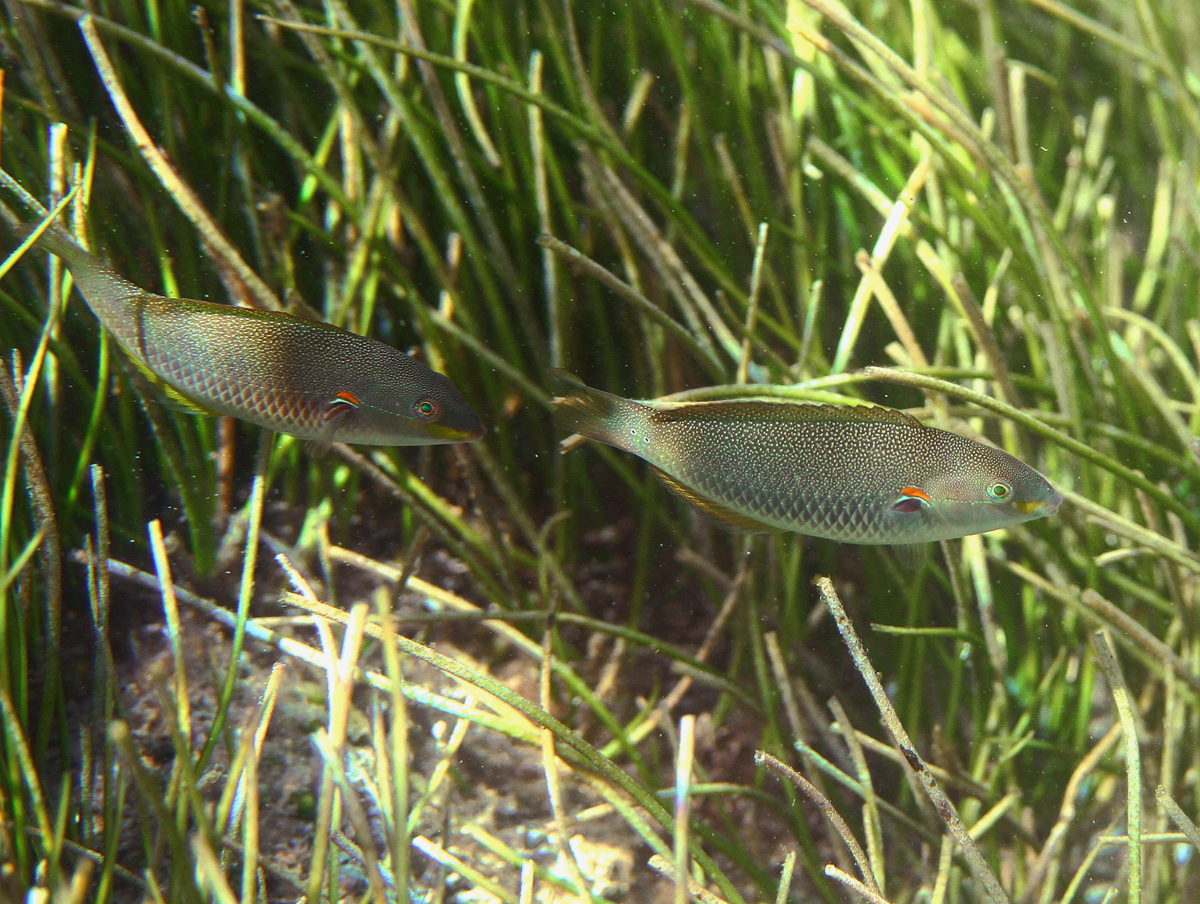
- Female blue-lined wrasses (Stethojulis albovittata)
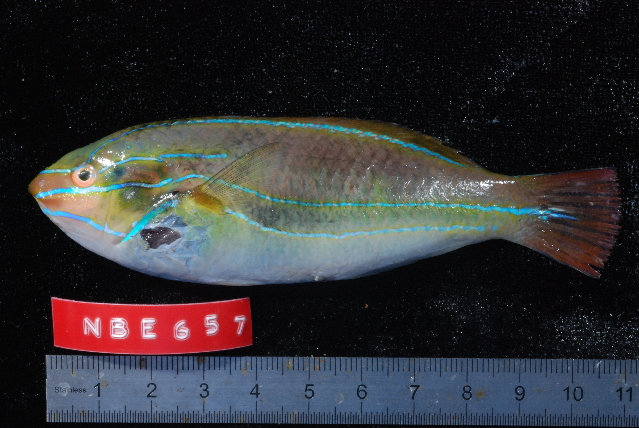

Conservation status
- Least Concern (IUCN 3.1)

Scientific classification
- Kingdom: Animalia
- Phylum: Chordata
- Class: Actinopterygii
- Division: Teleostei
- Order: Labriformes
- Family: Labridae
- Genus: Stethojulis
- Species: S. albovittata

Binomial name
- Stethojulis albovittata (Bonaterre, 1788)

Synonyms
- Labrus albovittatus Bonnaterre, 1788; Stethojulis albovittatus (Bonnaterre, 1788); Labrus koelreuteri Walbaum, 1792

= Stethojulis albovittata =

Species of fish

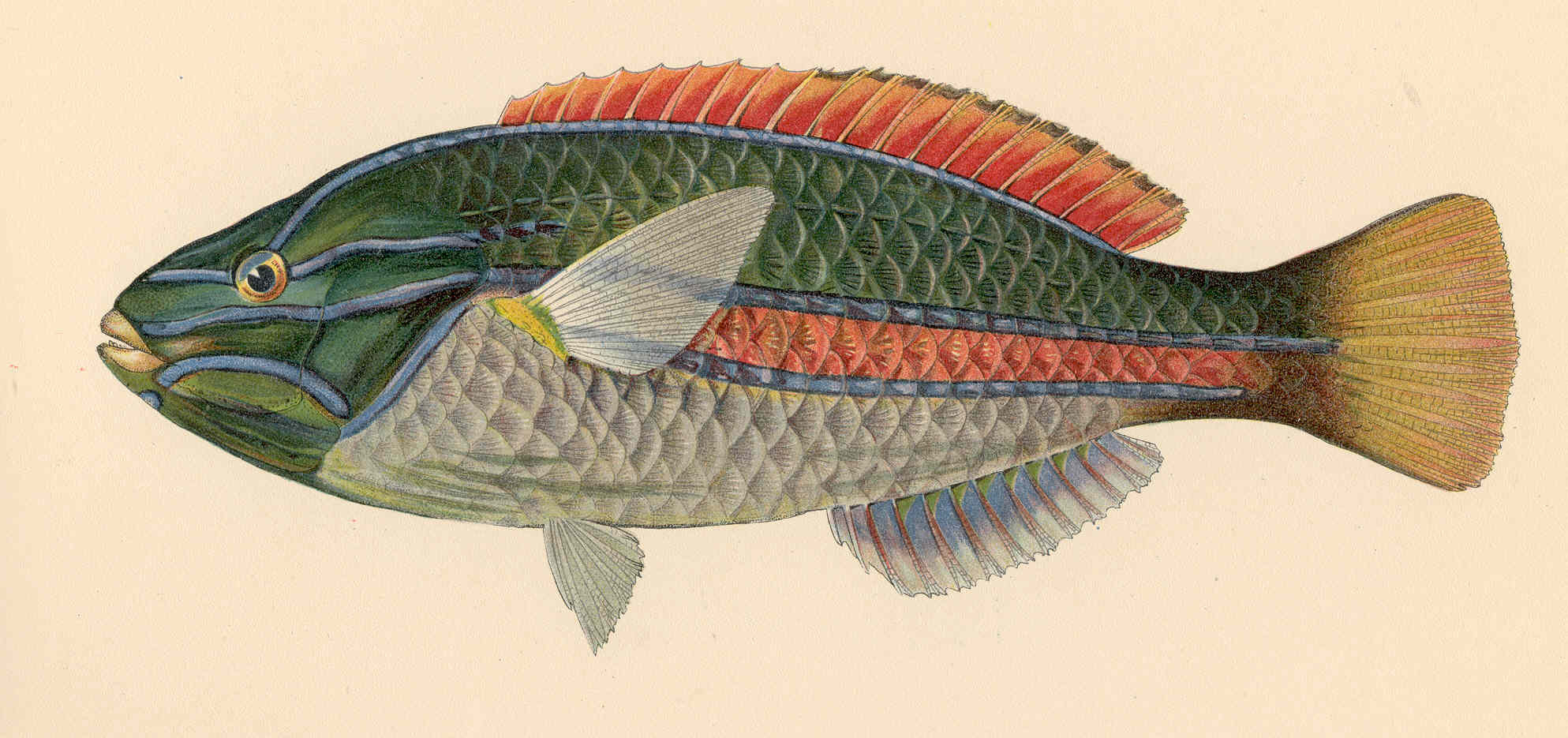

Stethojulis albovittatus, the blueline wrasse, whitelined wrasse or rainbowfish, is a species of marine ray-finned fish, a wrasse from the family Labridae. It is reef-dwelling fish that feeds on small invertebrates. It occurs in the Indian Ocean from the Red Sea as far south as South Africa to the islands of Bali and Sumatra. This species is found over reef flats, in clear lagoon and seaward reefs where it feeds diurnally on small invertebrates, particularly on crustaceans and molluscs. It has also been recorded over rocky areas in Réunion, as well as in seagrass beds off Mozambique. It is found solitarily or in small groups made up of one male and a small number of females.
