= Pseudogramma brederi =

Scientific classification
- Kingdom: Animalia
- Phylum: Chordata
- Class: Actinopterygii
- Order: Perciformes
- Family: Grammistidae
- Genus: Pseudogramma
- Species: P. brederi

Binomial name
- Pseudogramma brederi (Hildebrand, 1940)

Synonyms
- Pseudorhegma diagramma Schultz, 1966; Pseudogramma polyacantha hawaiiensis Randall and Baldwin, 1997

Species of ray-finned fish

Pseudogramma brederi, the confused podge, is a species of marine ray-finned fish in the family Grammistidae, native to the Indo-Pacific.
