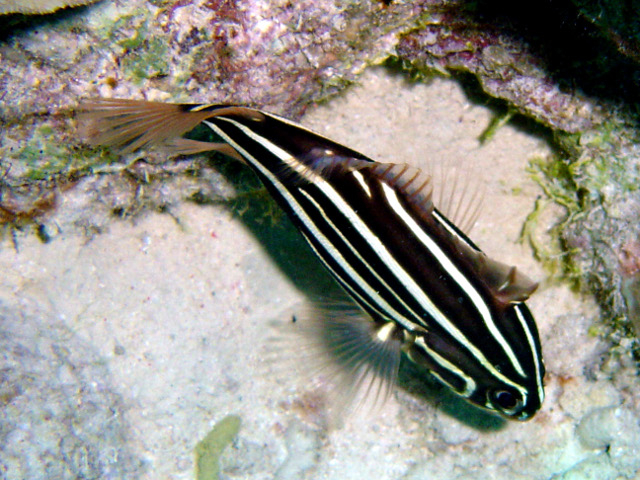
- Grammistes sexlineatus
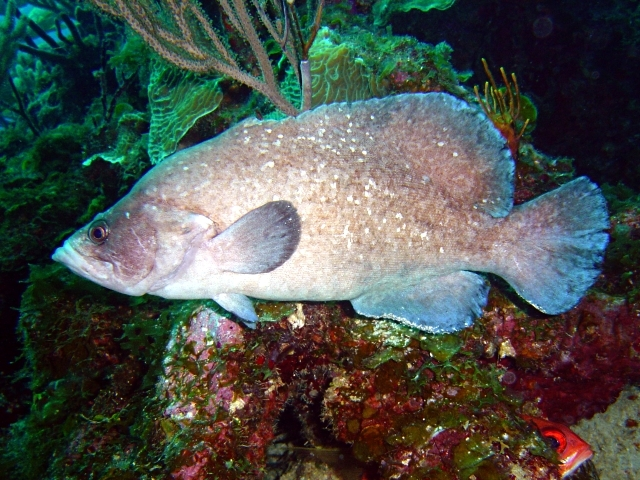
- Rypticus saponaceus

Scientific classification
- Kingdom: Animalia
- Phylum: Chordata
- Class: Actinopterygii
- Order: Perciformes
- Suborder: Percoidei
- Family: Grammistidae; Bleeker, 1857

Genera
- See text

= Grammistidae =

Family of marine fishes

Grammistidae is a family of percoid fish, commonly known as soapfishes (a name also used for the Diploprioninae). They are found in tropical oceans around the world. They were formerly considered a tribe of the family Serranidae, which also includes the anthias, groupers and the sea basses, but are now treated as a distinct family.

== Genera ==
The following genera are included within the Grammistidae:

- Aporops Schultz, 1943
- Grammistes Bloch & Schneider, 1801
- Grammistops Schultz 1953
- Jeboehlkia Robins, 1967
- Pogonoperca Günther, 1859
- Pseudogramma Bleeker, 1875
- Rypticus Cuvier, 1829
- Suttonia J. L. B. Smith, 1953
