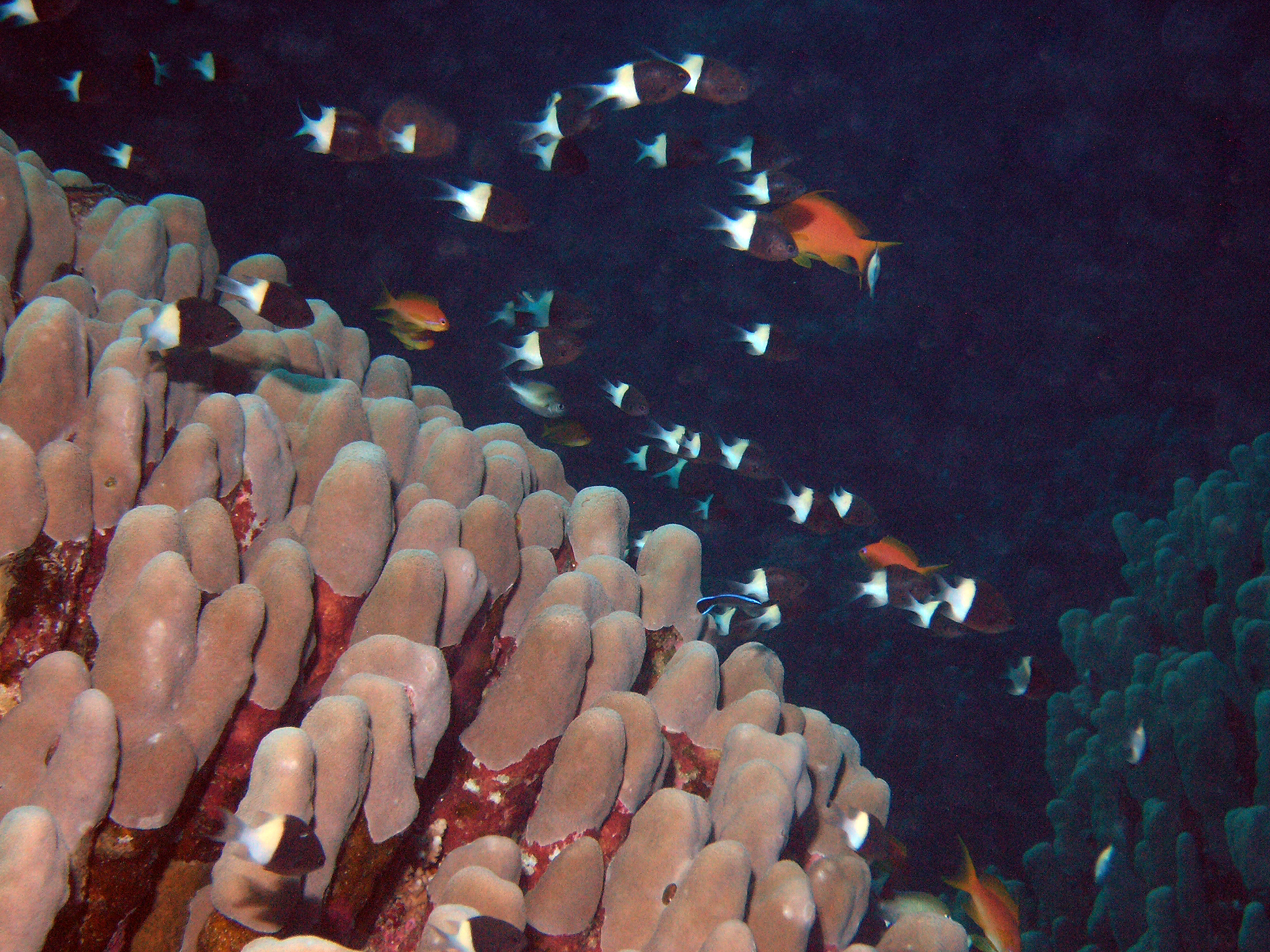

Scientific classification
- Kingdom: Animalia
- Phylum: Chordata
- Class: Actinopterygii
- Order: Blenniiformes
- Family: Pomacentridae
- Genus: Pycnochromis
- Species: P. dimidiatus

Binomial name
- Pycnochromis dimidiatus (Klunzinger, 1871)

= Pycnochromis dimidiatus =

Species of fish

Pycnochromis dimidiatus, commonly known as the chocolatedip chromis or Red Sea half-and-half chromis, is a species of chromine damselfish in the genus Pycnochromis. It is endemic to the Red Sea, where individuals prefer to live on reefs from depths of 1–36 m (3.3–118.1 ft). It was described by Carl Benjamin Klunzinger in 1871. It resembles several other species of the genus Pycnochromis, such as P. iomelas, P. fieldi (which was described for populations of P. dimidiata outside the red sea), P. hanui, P. margaritifer, and P. bami.
