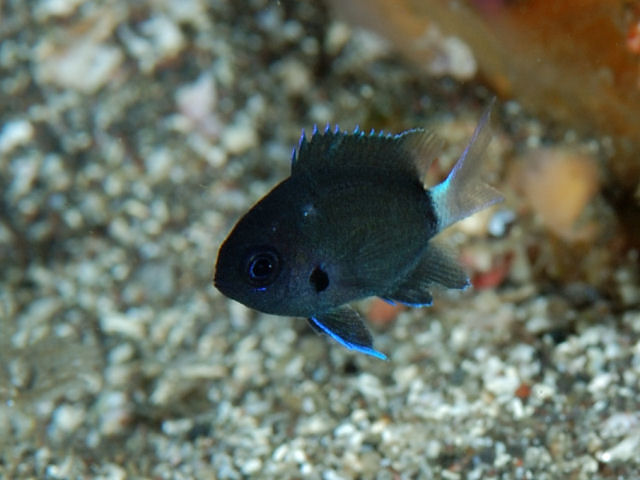

Conservation status
- Least Concern (IUCN 3.1)

Scientific classification
- Kingdom: Animalia
- Phylum: Chordata
- Class: Actinopterygii
- Order: Blenniiformes
- Family: Pomacentridae
- Genus: Pycnochromis
- Species: P. delta

Binomial name
- Pycnochromis delta (Randall, 1988)

Synonyms
- Chromis delta Randall, 1988

= Pycnochromis delta =

Species of Fish

Pycnochromis delta, the deep reef chromis, is a diurnal species of damselfish belonging to the genus Chromis. It can be found in the Indo-West Pacific, from Maldives and Christmas Island to Fiji, north to Taiwan and the Philippines, and south to Vanuatu. It can also be found in Tonga. It inhabits steep outer reef slopes with rich coral growth. They can either appear singly or in small groups remaining near shelter, often at the entrance of large caves or near its ceiling. It is oviparous, and the males of the species guard and aerate the eggs.
