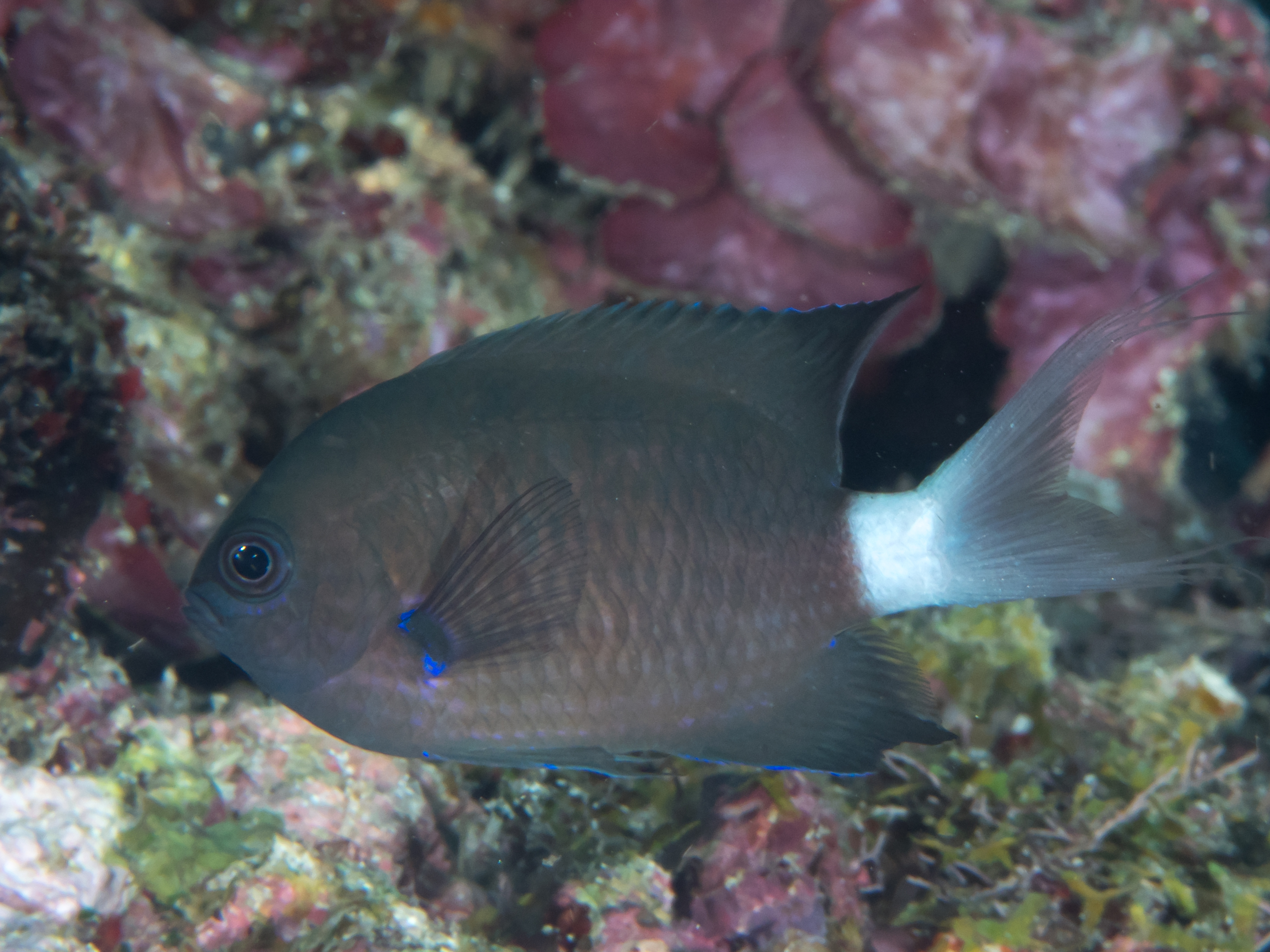

Conservation status
- Least Concern (IUCN 3.1)

Scientific classification
- Kingdom: Animalia
- Phylum: Chordata
- Class: Actinopterygii
- Order: Blenniiformes
- Family: Pomacentridae
- Genus: Pycnochromis
- Species: P. caudalis

Binomial name
- Pycnochromis caudalis (Randall, 1988)

Synonyms
- Chromis caudalis Randall, 1988

= Pycnochromis caudalis =

Species of fish

Pycnochromis caudalis, the blue-axil chromis, is a diurnal species of damselfish belonging to the genus Chromis. It can be found in the Western Pacific Ocean and the Eastern Indian Ocean from Christmas Island in the Indian Ocean to the Pacific Ocean in Indonesia and the Solomon Islands, north to the Philippines, including Vietnam, the Cocos Islands, Brunei Darussalam, East Timor and Papua New Guinea. It can also be found in Kiribati, the Marshall Islands, New Caledonia, Palau and Pohnpei in the Caroline Islands. It inhabits ledges and bases of small caves outside steep outer reef slopes. It is oviparous, and the males of the species guard and aerate the eggs.
