= Pycnochromis leucurus =

Conservation status
- Least Concern (IUCN 3.1)

Scientific classification
- Kingdom: Animalia
- Phylum: Chordata
- Class: Actinopterygii
- Division: Teleostei
- Order: Blenniiformes
- Family: Pomacentridae
- Genus: Pycnochromis
- Species: P. leucurus

Binomial name
- Pycnochromis leucurus (Gilbert, 1905)

Synonyms
- Chromis leucura Gilbert, 1905; Chromis leucurus Gilbert, 1905

Species of ray-finned fish

Pycnochromis leucurus, commonly known as whitetail chromis, is a species of damselfish belonging to the genus Pycnochromis. Its scientific name combines the Greek terms leukos and oura, meaning "white" and "tail". It was first described by American ichthyologist, Charles Henry Gilbert in 1905. However, the species was initially classified as Chromis leucura, then was reclassified to Pycnochromis leucurus in 2021. Later, genetic comparisons found that the Pycnochromis lineage is more closely related to the genus Dascyllus than Chromis.

== Description ==
This species are small fish with a deep, navy blue body, yellow lower fins, a pale thread-shaped tail, and a dark marking outlined in yellow near each pectoral fin. Young whitetail chromis' are a blue-gray color and can grow up to 2.5 in (64 mm) in length. As they mature, its dorsal fin consists of 12 stiff spines and 14 flexible rays, while its anal fin contains 2 spines and between 13 and 15 rays.

== Distribution and habitat ==
Pycnochromis leucurus is found in the Indo-Pacific. The species has been found between a range of approximately 20 and 122 m (66 and 400 ft) below the surface. First studies of the species originated from specimens collected in the ʻAuʻau Channel between Maui and Lānaʻi at depths of approximately 62 to 119 m (203 to 390 ft). Whitetail chromis are often observed gathering in small numbers.
