= Pycnochromis pacifica =

Scientific classification
- Kingdom: Animalia
- Phylum: Chordata
- Class: Actinopterygii
- Division: Teleostei
- Order: Blenniiformes
- Family: Pomacentridae
- Genus: Pycnochromis
- Species: P. pacifica

Binomial name
- Pycnochromis pacifica (Allen & Erdmann, 2020)

Species of ray-finned fish

Pycnochromis pacifica, the Pacific chromis, is a species of damselfish belonging to the genus Pycnochromis. It is found in the Pacific Ocean.

P. pacifica was formerly referred to as Pycnochromis agilis, but is now recognised as a distinct species. P. pacifica is distinguished from P. agilis, as it has a larger black spot at the base of the pectoral fin, covering the entire fin base.
