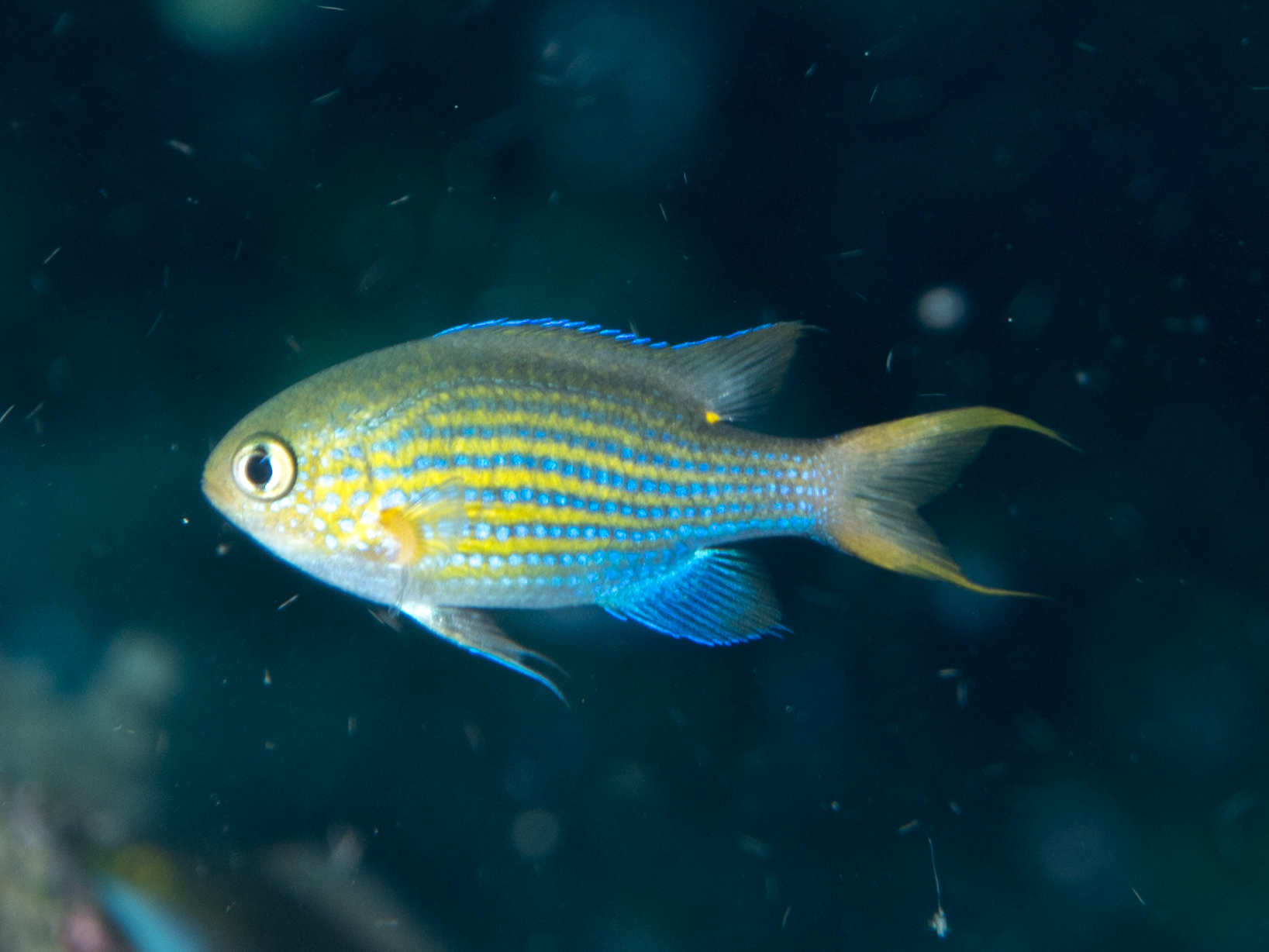

Conservation status
- Least Concern (IUCN 3.1)

Scientific classification
- Kingdom: Animalia
- Phylum: Chordata
- Class: Actinopterygii
- Order: Blenniiformes
- Family: Pomacentridae
- Genus: Pycnochromis
- Species: P. lineatus

Binomial name
- Pycnochromis lineatus (Fowler & Bean, 1928)

Synonyms
- Chromis lineata Fowler & Bean, 1928

= Pycnochromis lineatus =

Species of fish

Pycnochromis lineatus is a chromis from the Indo-Pacific. It occasionally makes its way into the aquarium trade. It grows to a size of 7 cm in length.
