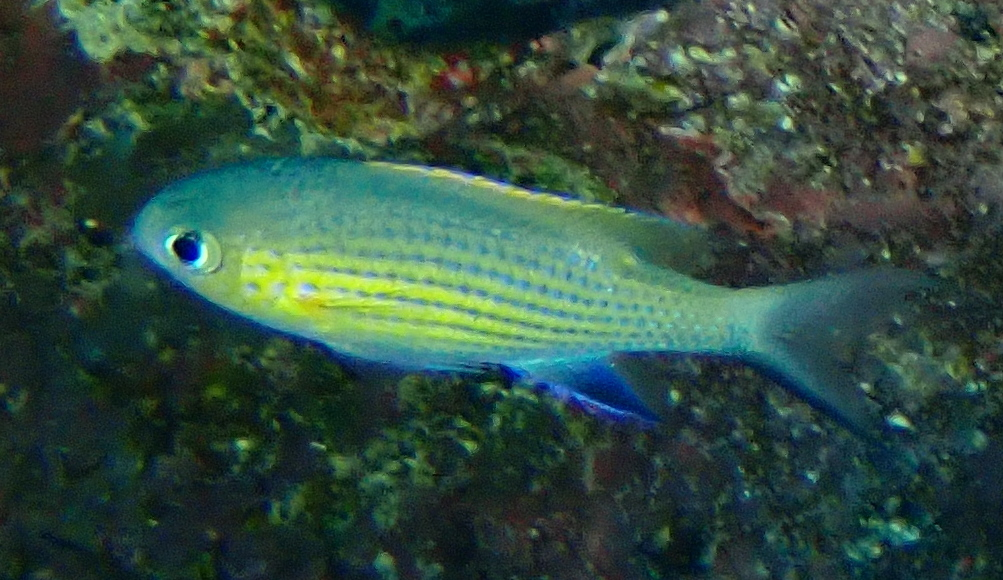
- Pycnochromis vanderbilti

Scientific classification
- Kingdom: Animalia
- Phylum: Chordata
- Class: Actinopterygii
- Order: Blenniiformes
- Family: Pomacentridae
- Subfamily: Chrominae
- Genus: Pycnochromis; Fowler, 1941

Type species
- Pycnochromis vanderbilti Fowler, 1941

Species
- See text

= Pycnochromis =

Genus of fishes

Pycnochromis is a genus belonging to the family Pomacentridae, the damselfishes and clownfishes, which is found in the Indian and Pacific Oceans.

== Species ==
The following 24 species are classified within the genus Pycnochromis:

- Pycnochromis abruptus (Randall, 2001)
- Pycnochromis acares (Randall & Swerdloff, 1973)
- Pycnochromis alleni (Randall, H. Ida & J. T. Moyer, 1981)
- Pycnochromis amboinensis (Bleeker, 1871)
- Pycnochromis atripes (Fowler & Bean, 1928)
- Pycnochromis bami (Randall & McCosker, 1992)
- Pycnochromis caudalis (Randall, 1988)
- Pycnochromis delta (Randall, 1988)
- Pycnochromis dimidiatus (Klunzinger, 1871)
- Pycnochromis fatuhivae (Randall, 2001)
- Pycnochromis fieldi (Randall & DiBattista, 2013)
- Pycnochromis flavipectoralis (Randall, 1988)
- Pycnochromis hanui (Randall & Swerdloff, 1973)
- Pycnochromis howsoni (Allen & Erdmann, 2014)
- Pycnochromis iomelas (Jordan & Seale, 1906)
- Pycnochromis leucurus (Gilbert, 1905)
- Pycnochromis lineatus (Fowler & Bean, 1928)
- Pycnochromis margaritifer (Fowler, 1946)
- Pycnochromis nigrurus (J. L. B. Smith, 1960)
- Pycnochromis ovatiformis (Fowler, 1946)
- Pycnochromis pacifica (Allen & Erdmann, 2020)
- Pycnochromis retrofasciatus (Weber, 1913)
- Pycnochromis vanderbilti Fowler, 1941
