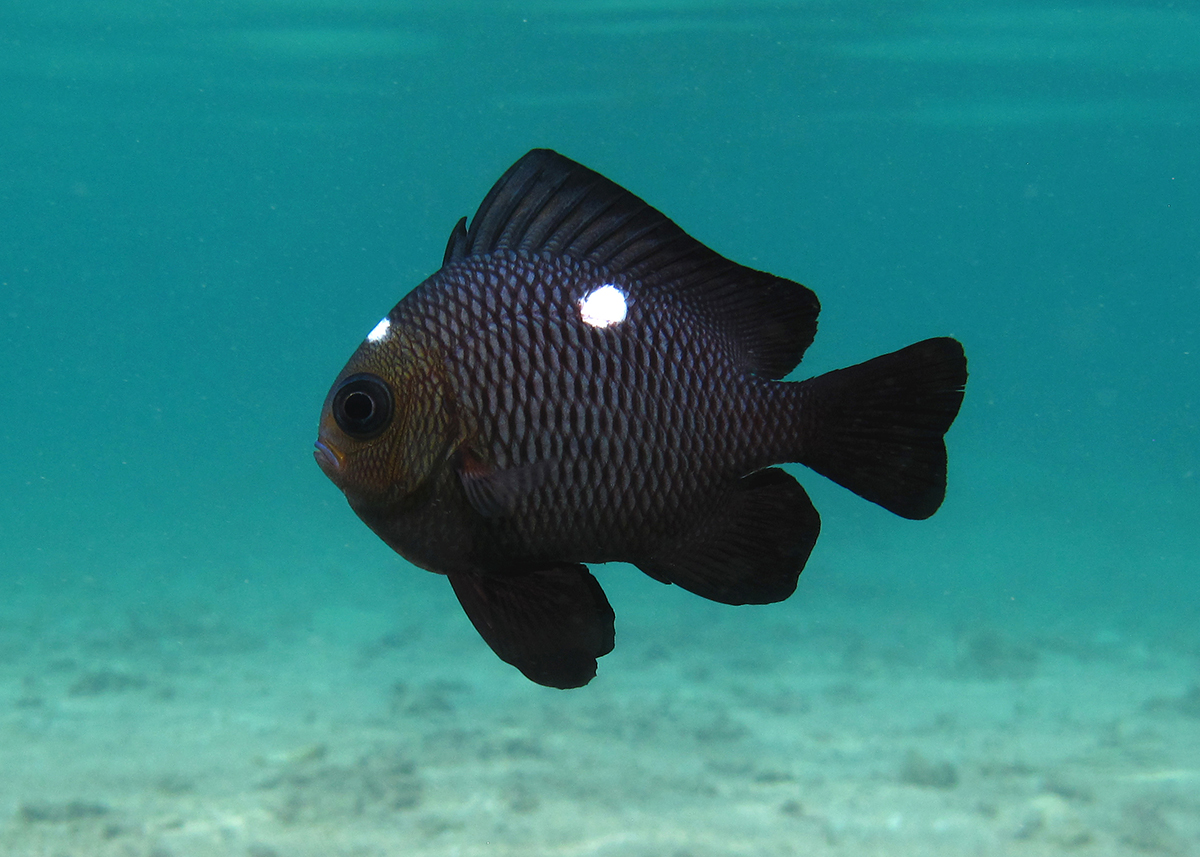
- Dascyllus trimaculatus

Scientific classification
- Kingdom: Animalia
- Phylum: Chordata
- Class: Actinopterygii
- Clade: Ovalentaria
- Order: Blenniiformes
- Family: Pomacentridae
- Subfamily: Chrominae; Allen, 1975

= Chrominae =

Subfamily of fishes

Chrominae is a subfamily of the family Pomacentridae, which consists of the damselfishes and the clownfishes.

== Genera ==
The subfamily Chrominae contains 4 genera:

Genus	Image
Azurina D.S. Jordan & McGregor, 1898	A. cyanea
Chromis Cuvier, 1814	C. viridis
Dascyllus Cuvier, 1829	D. aruanus
Pycnochromis Fowler, 1941	P. atripes

The genus Pycnochromis, which is not mentioned in the 5th edition of Fishes of the World, has been regarded as a junior synonym of Chromis but is now recognised as a valid genus by some authorities. In addition, the genera Acanthochromis and Altrichthys which the 5th edition of Fishes of the World included in this subfamily have been reclassified as belonging to the Pomacentrinae.
