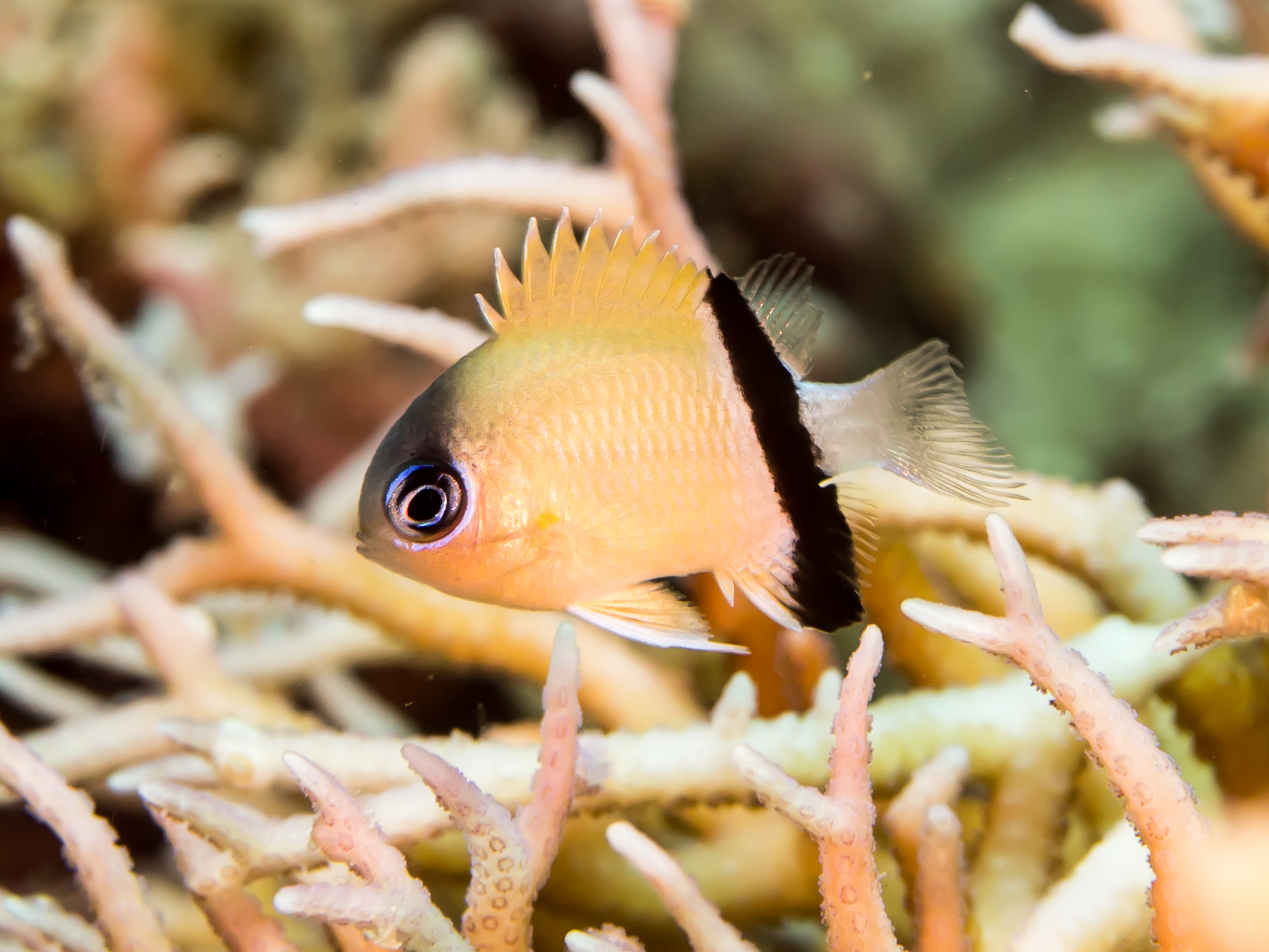

Conservation status
- Least Concern (IUCN 3.1)

Scientific classification
- Kingdom: Animalia
- Phylum: Chordata
- Class: Actinopterygii
- Order: Blenniiformes
- Family: Pomacentridae
- Genus: Pycnochromis
- Species: P. retrofasciatus

Binomial name
- Pycnochromis retrofasciatus (Weber, 1913)

Synonyms
- Chromis retrofasciata Weber, 1913

= Pycnochromis retrofasciatus =

Species of fish

Pycnochromis retrofasciatus, the black-bar chromis, is a Chromis from the Western Pacific Ocean. It occasionally makes its way into the aquarium trade. It grows to a size of 4 cm in length.
