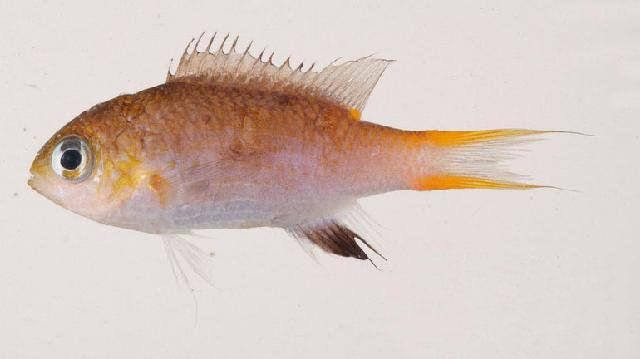

Conservation status
- Least Concern (IUCN 3.1)

Scientific classification
- Kingdom: Animalia
- Phylum: Chordata
- Class: Actinopterygii
- Order: Blenniiformes
- Family: Pomacentridae
- Genus: Pycnochromis
- Species: P. acares

Binomial name
- Pycnochromis acares (J. E. Randall & Swerdloff, 1973)

Synonyms
- Chromis acares Randall & Swerdloff, 1973

= Pycnochromis acares =

Species of fish

Pycnochromis acares is a species of damselfish that is native to the Pacific Ocean.

== Distribution and habitat ==
They are commonly found within reefs and sometimes lagoons throughout the Pacific Ocean. Their distribution ranges from Japan to Hawaii, Vanuatu, and the Austral Islands. People encounter them at depths of 2 metres (6.6 ft) to 37 metres (121 ft).

== Description ==
Adults of this species can grow up to a maximum size of up to 4 centimetres (1.6 in). They exhibit white with a yellow blotch that extends from the eye to the pectoral fin. Its dorsal and caudal fins are yellow.

== Ecology ==
=== Diet ===
Pycnochromis acares is an omnivorous species of fish.

=== Behavior ===
This species of damselfish occurs in big to small aggregations above coral heads or rubble.

== In the aquarium ==
In the aquarium trade, this species of fish is uncommon.
