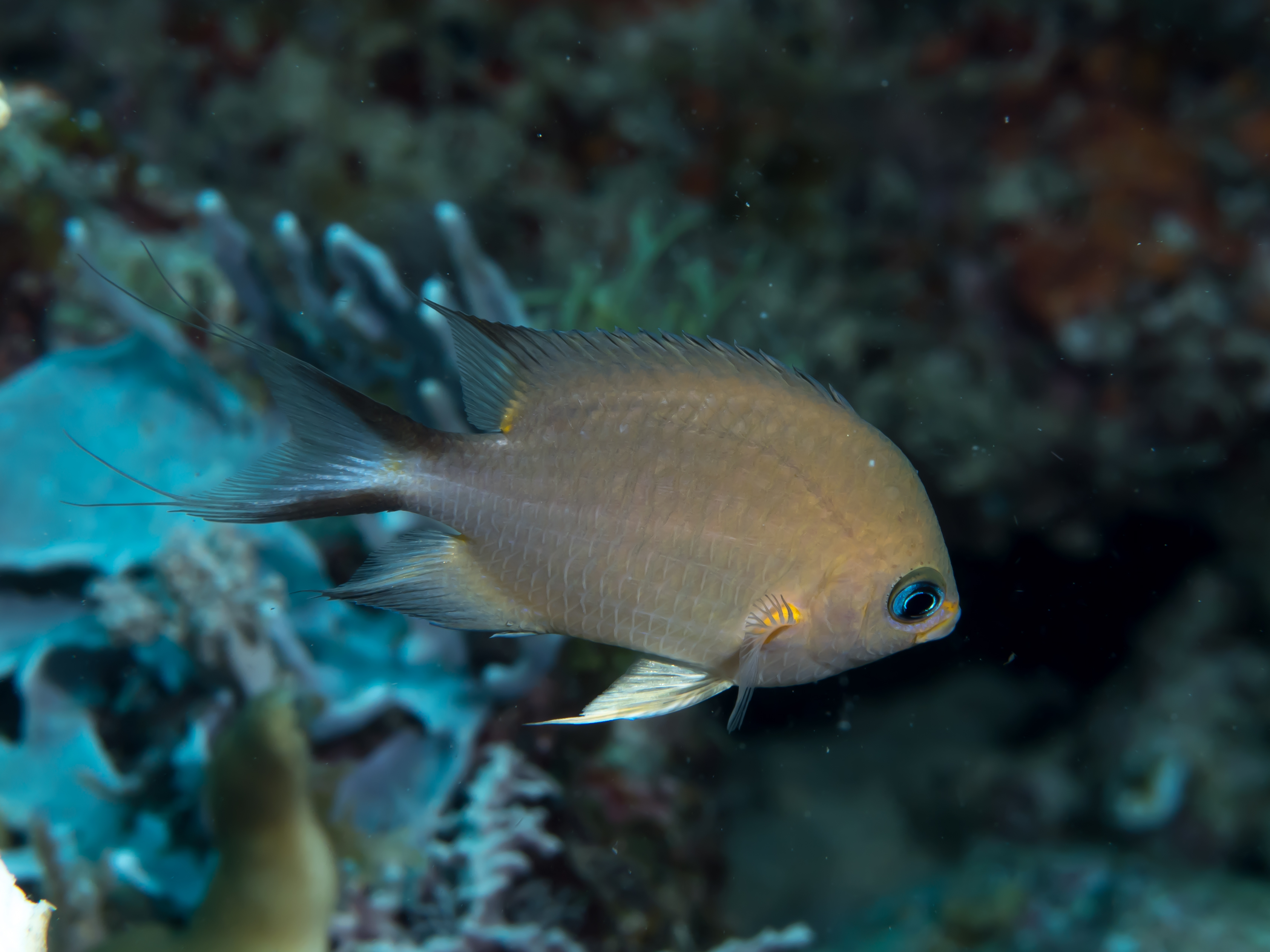

Conservation status
- Least Concern (IUCN 3.1)

Scientific classification
- Kingdom: Animalia
- Phylum: Chordata
- Class: Actinopterygii
- Order: Blenniiformes
- Family: Pomacentridae
- Genus: Pycnochromis
- Species: P. amboinensis

Binomial name
- Pycnochromis amboinensis (Bleeker, 1871)

Synonyms
- Heliases amboinensis Bleeker, 1871; Chromis amboinensis (Bleeker, 1871); Gliphidodon bimaculatus Macleay, 1883; Abudefduf bimaculatus (Macleay, 1883); Glyphisodon bimaculatus Macleay, 1883; Chromis fragoris Whitley, 1964

= Pycnochromis amboinensis =

Species of fish

Pycnochromis amboinensis, the Ambon chromis, is a damselfish from the Western Pacific. It occasionally makes its way into the aquarium trade. It grows to a size of 9 cm (3.5 in) in length.
