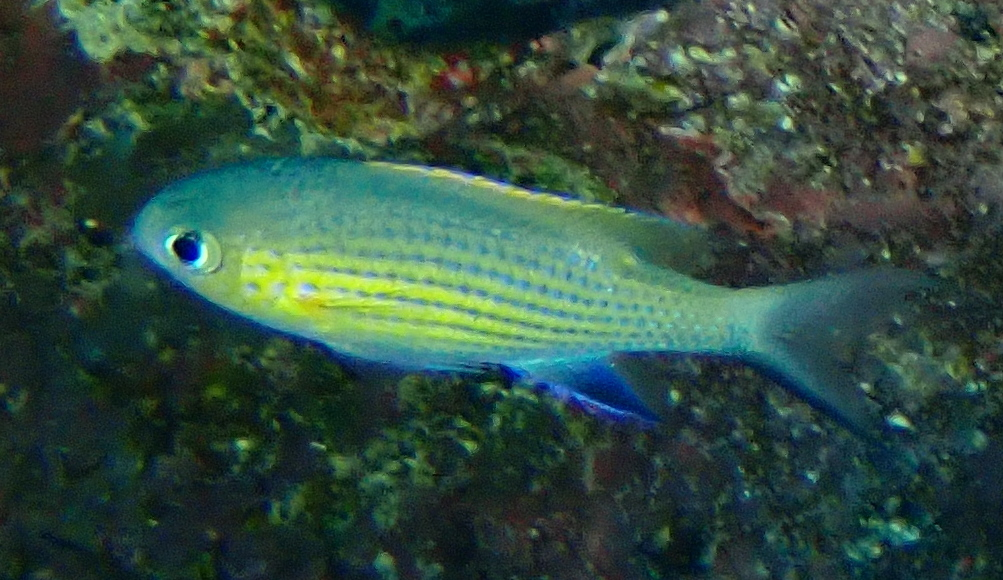

Conservation status
- Least Concern (IUCN 3.1)

Scientific classification
- Kingdom: Animalia
- Phylum: Chordata
- Class: Actinopterygii
- Order: Blenniiformes
- Family: Pomacentridae
- Genus: Pycnochromis
- Species: P. vanderbilti

Binomial name
- Pycnochromis vanderbilti Fowler, 1941

Synonyms
- Chromis vanderbilti (Fowler, 1941)

= Pycnochromis vanderbilti =

Species of fish

Pycnochromis vanderbilti, commonly known as Vanderbilt's chromis, is a species of damselfish native to the Indian Ocean and the Pacific Ocean. The specific name honours the yachtsman and explorer George Washington Vanderbilt III (1914–1961), the organiser of an expedition to Oahu in 1940 during which the type was collected. In naming this species Fowler acknowledged Vanderbilt for his role in developing the collection of fishes at the Academy of Natural Sciences of Philadelphia.

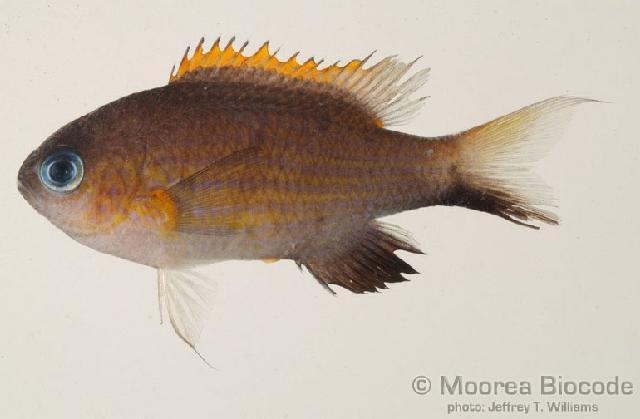

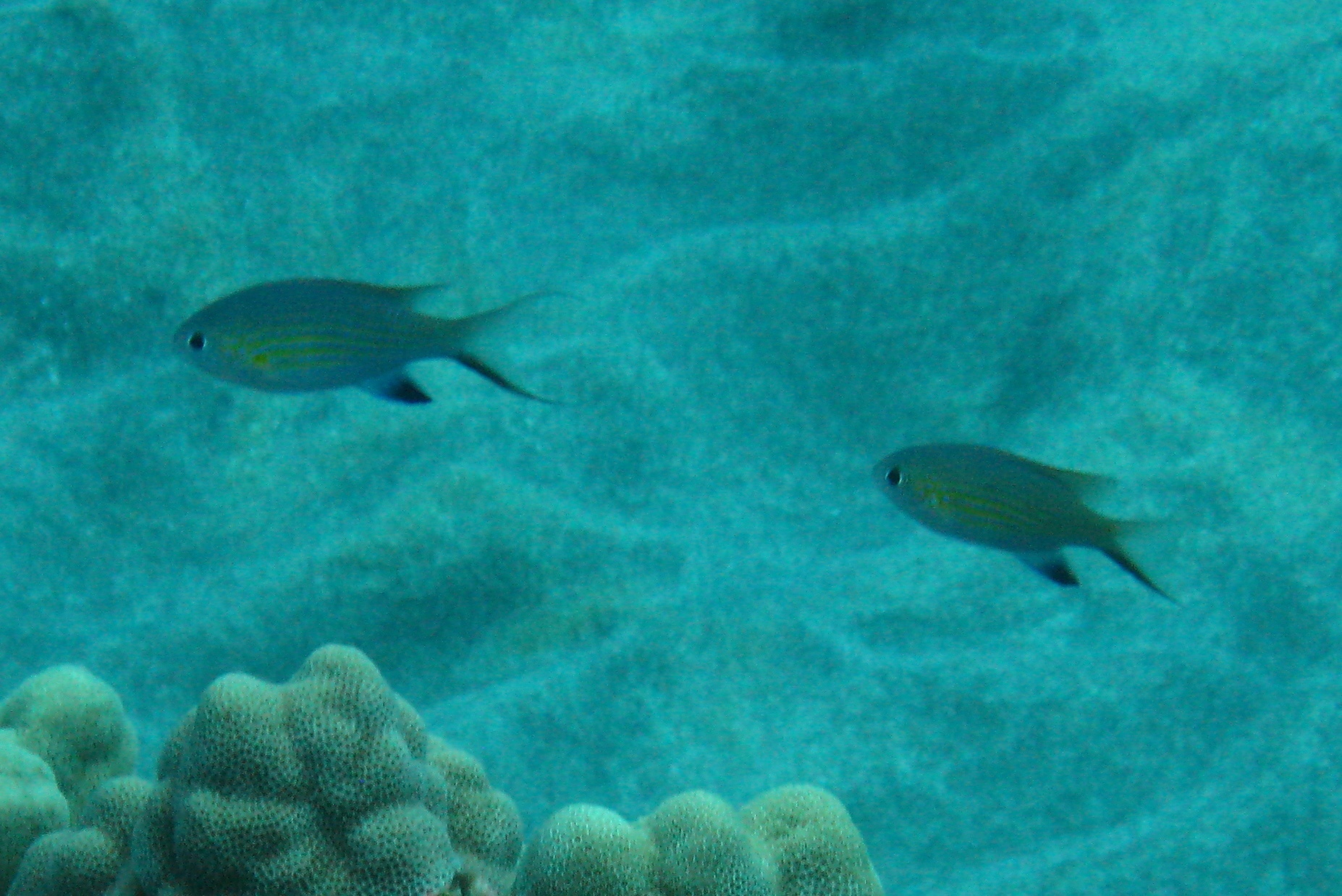
