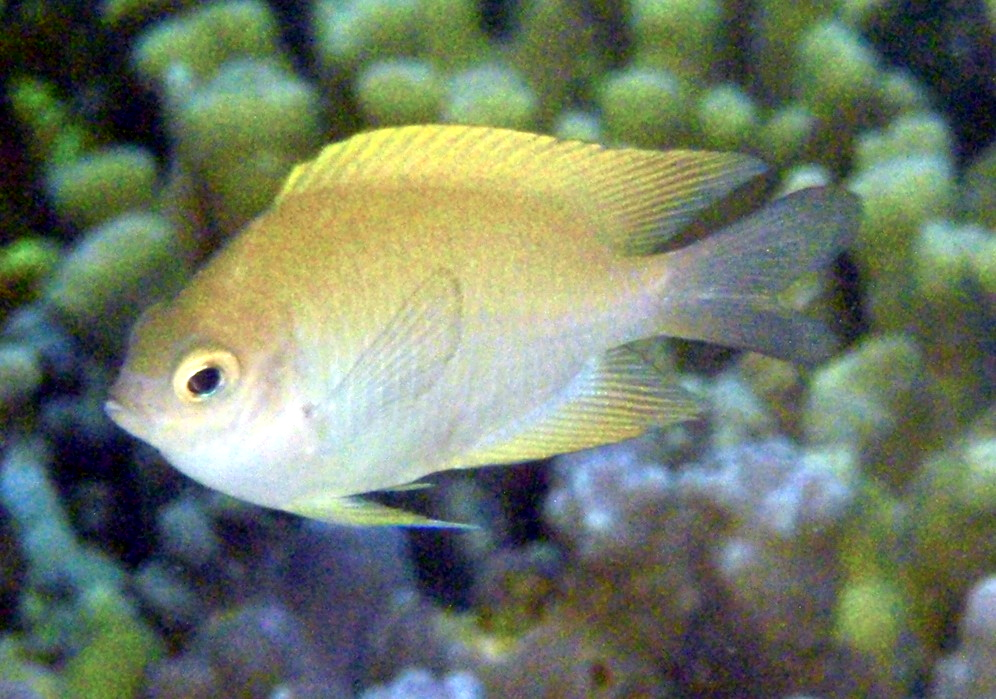
- Altrichthys curatus

Scientific classification
- Domain: Eukaryota
- Kingdom: Animalia
- Phylum: Chordata
- Class: Actinopterygii
- Order: Blenniiformes
- Family: Pomacentridae
- Subfamily: Chrominae
- Genus: Altrichthys; Allen, 1999

Species
- 2, see text.

= Altrichthys =

Genus of fishes

Altrichthys is a small genus of damselfish in the family Pomacentridae, native to the central Indo-Pacific.

== Species ==
There are three species in the genus.

Species	Common name	Image
Altrichthys alelia Bernardi, Longo & Quiros, 2017		
Altrichthys azurelineatus (Fowler and Bean, 1928)	azure damsel	
Altrichthys curatus (Allen, 1999)	guardian damselfish	
