= Pycnochromis hanui =

Conservation status
- Least Concern (IUCN 3.1)

Scientific classification
- Kingdom: Animalia
- Phylum: Chordata
- Class: Actinopterygii
- Order: Blenniiformes
- Family: Pomacentridae
- Genus: Pycnochromis
- Species: P. hanui

Binomial name
- Pycnochromis hanui (Randall & Swerdloff, 1973)

Synonyms
- Chromis hanui

Species of fish

Pycnochromis hanui, commonly known as chocolate-dip chromis, is a species of damselfish endemic to Hawaii.

== Description and biology ==
Pycnochromis hanui was formerly known as Chromis hanui. They reach a max length of 6.0 cm, and have an oval shaped body with a pointed nose and forked tail. They have a total of 12 dorsal spines, 13 dorsal soft rays, 2 anal spines, and 13-14 anal soft rays. The common name matches its appearance. The front half of its body looks as if it has been dipped in chocolate. They are brown with a black spot on the pectoral fin base. The caudal fin, caudal peduncle and adjacent part of the dorsal and anal fins are white. Nuptial males have a yellowish-brown zone in the center and bright eyes. Males guard and remove waste from the eggs, keeping them healthy. Pycnochromis hanui are planktivore.

== Distribution and habitat ==
Pycnochromis hanui is endemic to Hawaii. Adult Chocolate-dip Chromis live in inshore and offshore reefs. They are found in mass groups above corals. They live in scuba depths of 6-50 meters, and live in 28°N - 17°N temperatures.
