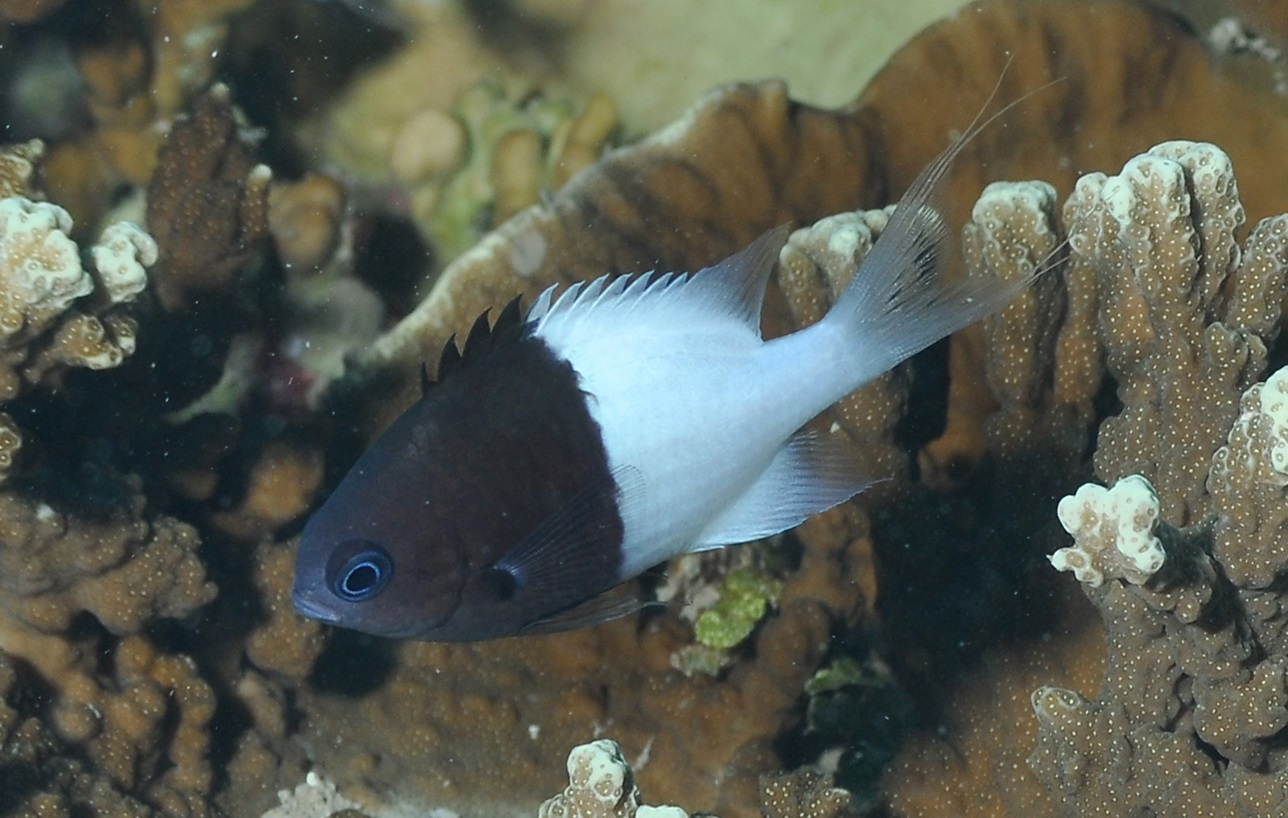

Conservation status
- Least Concern (IUCN 3.1)

Scientific classification
- Kingdom: Animalia
- Phylum: Chordata
- Class: Actinopterygii
- Order: Blenniiformes
- Family: Pomacentridae
- Genus: Pycnochromis
- Species: P. iomelas

Binomial name
- Pycnochromis iomelas (Jordan & Seale, 1906)

Synonyms
- Chromis iomelas Jordan & Seale, 1906

= Pycnochromis iomelas =

Species of fish

Pycnochromis iomelas , also known as the half and half chromis, is a species of reef dwelling fish in the family Pomacentridae. It is occasionally seen for sale in the aquarium trade.

== Description ==
Pycnochromis iomelas is split in color, being solid black from the middle of the dorsal fin to the nose, and solid white from the middle of the dorsal fin to the end of the caudal fin. It grows to a size of 8 cm in length.

== Distribution ==
Pycnochromis iomelas is from the Pacific Ocean. It can be found on the Great Barrier Reef, and reefs around northern New Guinea, Samoa, and the Society Islands.
