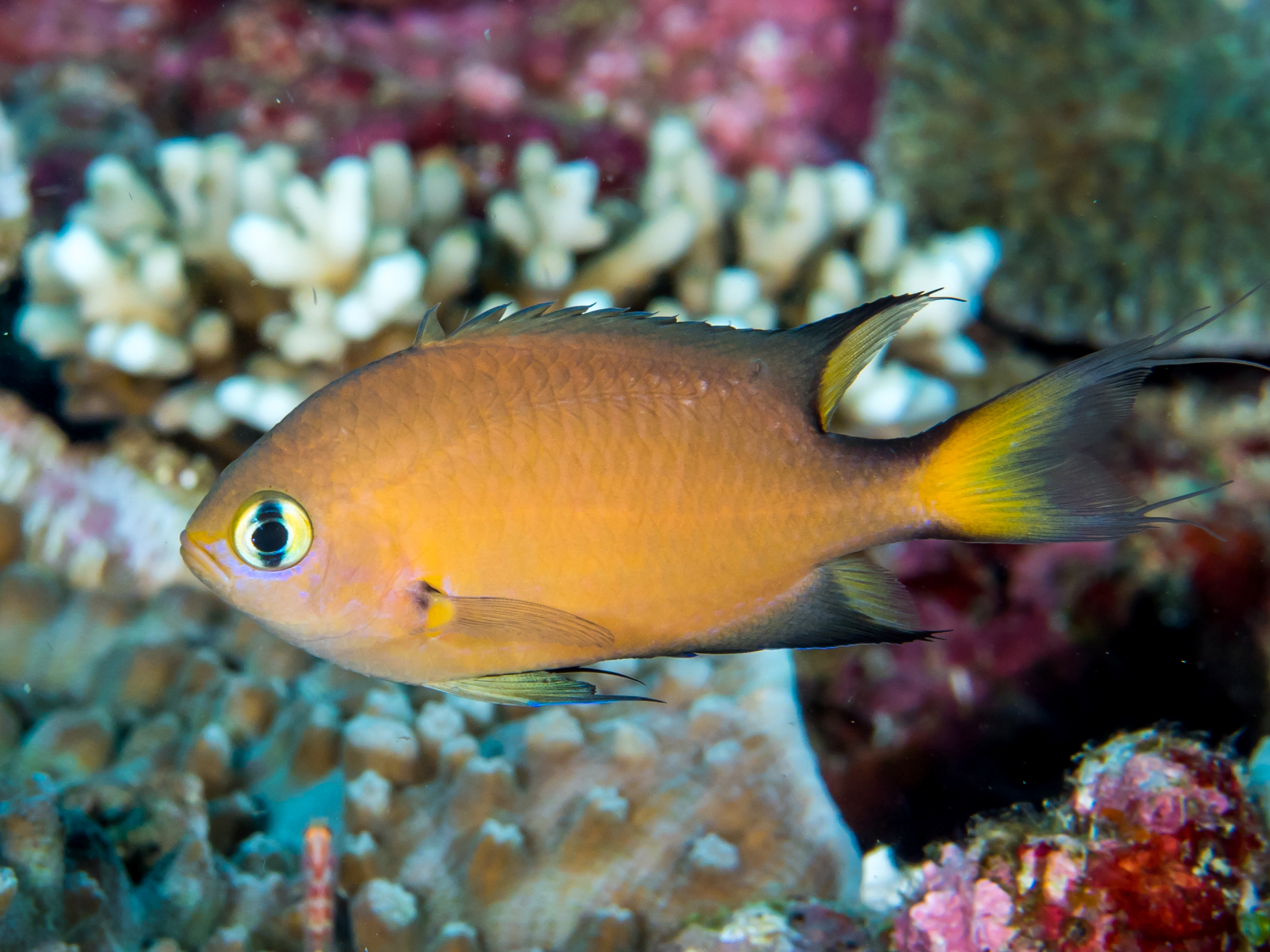

Conservation status
- Least Concern (IUCN 3.1)

Scientific classification
- Kingdom: Animalia
- Phylum: Chordata
- Class: Actinopterygii
- Order: Blenniiformes
- Family: Pomacentridae
- Genus: Pycnochromis
- Species: P. atripes

Binomial name
- Pycnochromis atripes (Fowler & Bean, 1928)

Synonyms
- Chromis atripes Fowler & Bean, 1928

= Pycnochromis atripes =

Species of Fish

Pycnochromis atripes, the dark-fin chromis, is a diurnal species of damselfish belonging to the genus Pycnochromis. It can be found in the Western Pacific Ocean in Christmas Islands and in north-western Australia in the East Indian Ocean to Kiribati, and north to Southern Japan. It can also be found in Tonga. It inhabits areas of outer reef and slopes which are rich in coral, appearing singly or in small groups near the bottom. It is oviparous, and the males of the species guard and aerate the eggs.
