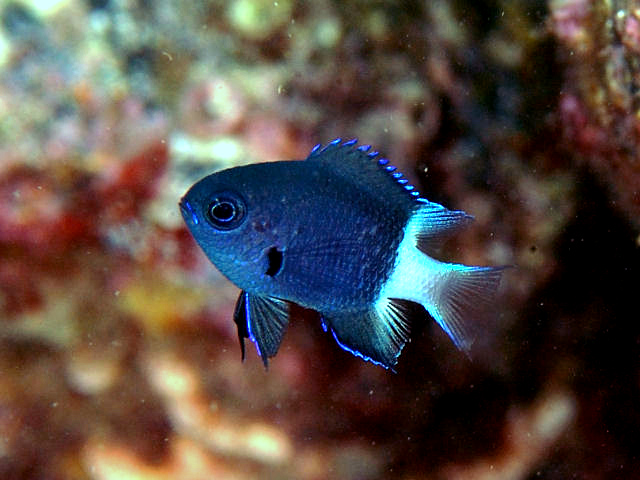

Conservation status
- Least Concern (IUCN 3.1)

Scientific classification
- Kingdom: Animalia
- Phylum: Chordata
- Class: Actinopterygii
- Order: Blenniiformes
- Family: Pomacentridae
- Genus: Pycnochromis
- Species: P. margaritifer

Binomial name
- Pycnochromis margaritifer Fowler, 1946

Synonyms
- Chromis dimidiatus margaritifer Fowler, 1946; Chromis margarifer Fowler, 1946 (misspelling); Chromis margaritifera Fowler, 1946 (misspelling)

= Pycnochromis margaritifer =

Species of fish

Pycnochromis margaritifer, known commonly as the bicolor chromis, is a species of marine fish in the family Pomacentridae. The species was reclassified as Pycnochromis margaritifer in 2021, and is still listed under the former name Chromis margaritifer in some places.

== Distribution ==
The bicolor chromis is widespread throughout the tropical waters of the central Indo-Pacific region until the oceanic islands of the central Pacific Ocean.

== Description ==
The bicolor chromis is a small fish and can reach a maximum size of 9 cm length.
