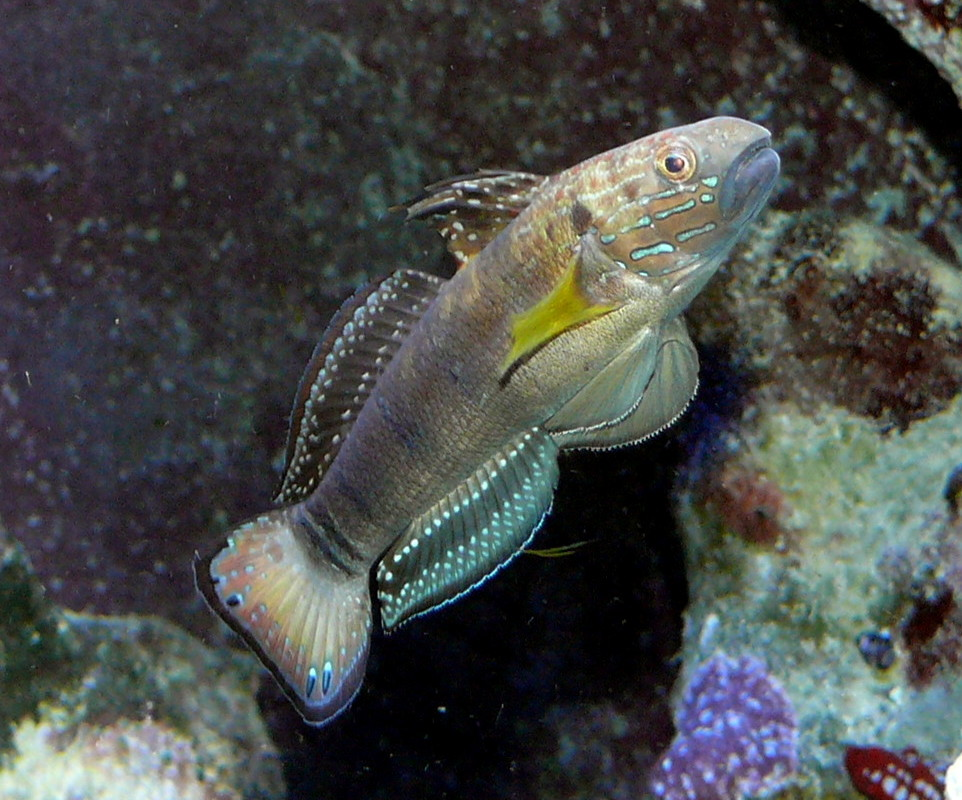

Scientific classification
- Kingdom: Animalia
- Phylum: Chordata
- Class: Actinopterygii
- Order: Gobiiformes
- Family: Gobiidae
- Genus: Amblygobius
- Species: A. phalaena

Binomial name
- Amblygobius phalaena (Valenciennes, 1837)

Synonyms
- Gobius phalaena Valenciennes, 1837; Gobius annulatus De Vis, 1884

= Amblygobius phalaena =

White-barred goby

Species of fish

Amblygobius phalaena, the Sleeper Banded goby, white-barred goby, is a species of goby native to tropical reefs of the western Pacific Ocean and through the central Indo-Pacific area at depths of from 2 to 20 metres (6.6 to 65.6 ft). This species feeds by taking in mouthfuls of sand and sifting out algae, invertebrates and other organic matter. It can reach a length of 15 centimetres (5.9 in) TL. It is also of minor importance to local commercial fisheries and can also be found in the aquarium trade.
