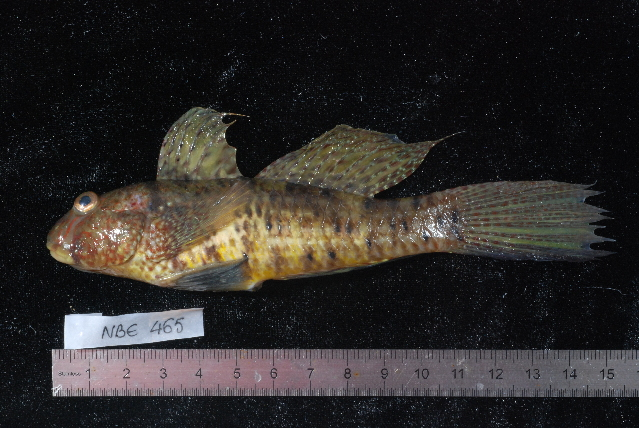
- Amblygobius sphynx (Valenciennes, 1837)

Conservation status
- Least Concern (IUCN 3.1)

Scientific classification
- Kingdom: Animalia
- Phylum: Chordata
- Class: Actinopterygii
- Order: Gobiiformes
- Family: Gobiidae
- Genus: Amblygobius
- Species: A. sphynx

Binomial name
- Amblygobius sphynx (Valenciennes, 1837)

Synonyms
- Gobius sphynx Valenciennes, 1837; Gobius deilus Sauvage, 1880; Gobius rubrotaeniatus Liénard, 1891; Gobius stagon J. L. B. Smith, 1947

= Amblygobius sphynx =

Species of goby

Amblygobius sphynx or the Sphinx goby is a species of goby found in brackish and salt water in the Indo-West Pacific region.

== Description ==
Amblygobius sphynx has a total of 7 spines and 13-15 soft rays in its dorsal fins, the anal fin has a single spine and 13-15 soft rays. The background colour on the body is yellowish brown fading to white on the underside. There are 5-6 dark brown bars with white markings between them on the flanks and there is a row of small, widely separated black spots along the upper back. The first and second dorsal fins are equal in height and the caudal fin is rounded. The bost scales are ctenoid while those on the nape, abdomen, and breast are cycloid. The depth of the body is 3.6 to 4 times the standard length. The maximum total length is 18 centimetres (7.1 in).

== Distribution ==
Ambygobius sphinx has been recorded from the eastern coast of Africa from Eritrea in the north to Maputo, Mozambique, in the south east to the Marshall Islands and Kiribati and south to the Great Barrier Reef and north to Japan.

== Habitat and biology ==
Ambygobius sphinx has been recorded from depths of 1–20 metres (3.3–65.6 ft) and is associated with reefs where it occurs singly or in pairs It hovers just above the substrate in sandy areas with sparse seagrass where it creates a burrow which it uses as a refuge. It feeds by sifting mouthfuls of sand from which it extracts crustaceans and gastropods.

== Conservation ==
This species is common, it is frequently recorded and has a wide distribution. It is of minor importance in the aquarium trade. It is classed as Least Concern by the IUCN.
