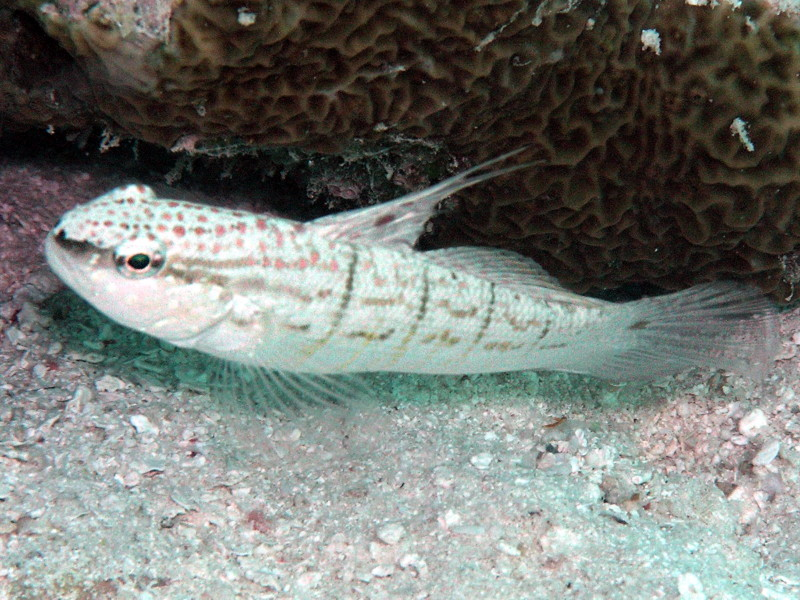

Scientific classification
- Kingdom: Animalia
- Phylum: Chordata
- Class: Actinopterygii
- Order: Gobiiformes
- Family: Gobiidae
- Genus: Amblygobius
- Species: A. semicinctus

Binomial name
- Amblygobius semicinctus (Bennett, 1833)

Synonyms
- Gobius semicinctus Bennett, 1833

= Amblygobius semicinctus =

Species of fish

Amblygobius semicinctus, the halfbarred goby , is a species of goby from family Gobiidae.

== Description ==
The Halfbarred goby is a small fish which can reach a length of 11 centimetres (4.3 in) TL. Its background body colour is greenish brown with a kind of complex pattern of red-brown longitudinal lines running along the body and spots on the head. A dark line starting from the snout passing through the eye and melt backside with the other longitudinal lines. The body is also marked with 4 to 6 vertical black bars, a dark ocellus on the first dorsal fin and on the operculum, and finally a dark spot on the superior part of the caudal fin.

== Distribution & habitat ==
Amblyeleotris semicinctus is found in the western Indian Ocean from the Maldives to the eastern African coast. It likes sandy bottom in protected and shallow lagoons and bays. It lives usually in couple in a burrow dug under a rock or a piece of coral.

== Biology ==
This goby is an omnivorous fish which feeds by taking in mouthfuls of sand and sifting out algae, invertebrates and other organic matter. The species is monogamous.
