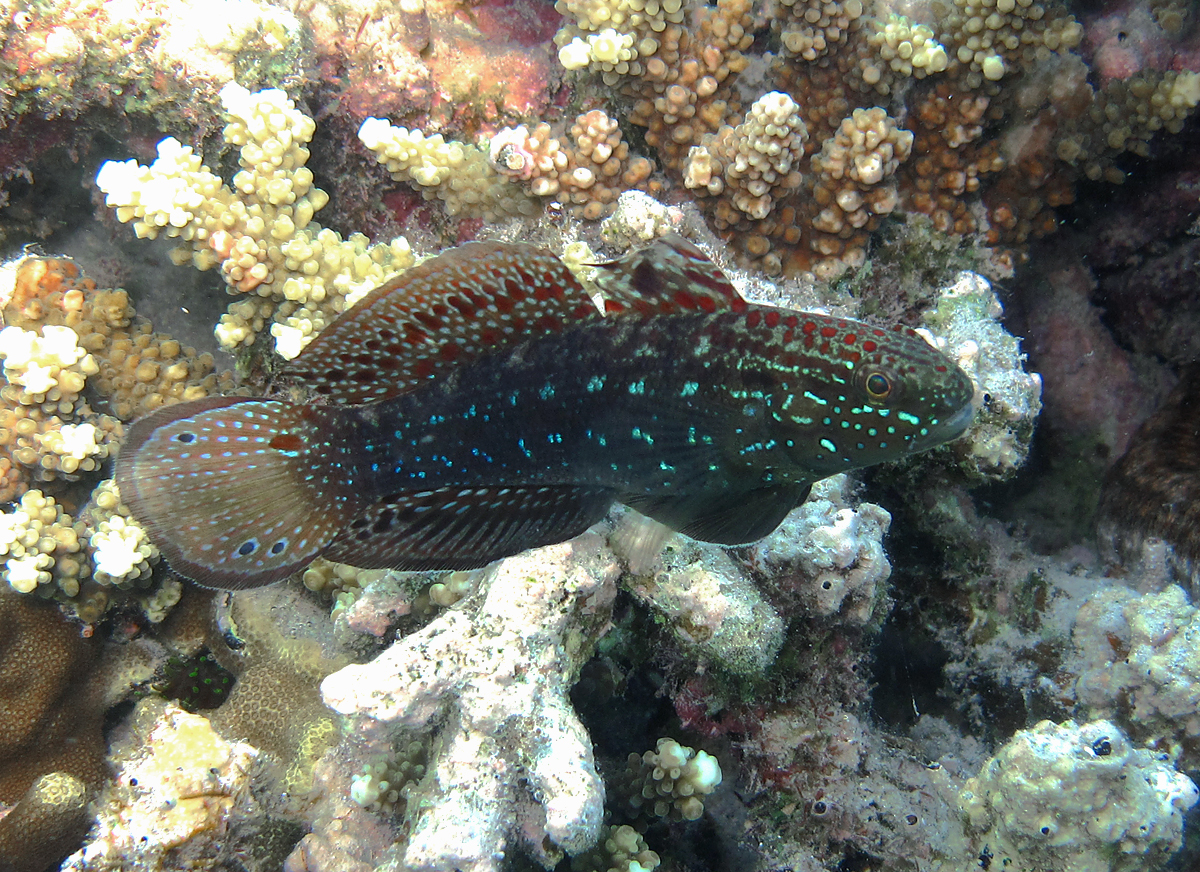
- Amblygobius semicinctus

Scientific classification
- Kingdom: Animalia
- Phylum: Chordata
- Class: Actinopterygii
- Division: Teleostei
- Order: Gobiiformes
- Family: Gobiidae
- Subfamily: Gobiinae
- Genus: Amblygobius; Bleeker, 1874

Type species
- Gobius sphynx Valenciennes, 1837

Synonyms
- Ambligobius unaccepted (misspelling); Seychellea Smith, 1957 unaccepted; Seychellia unaccepted (misspelling); Yabotichthys Herre, 1945 unaccepted

= Amblygobius =

Genus of fishes

Amblygobius is a genus of fish in the family Gobiidae found in the Indian and Pacific Ocean.

== Species ==
There are currently 15 recognized species in this genus:

- Amblygobius albimaculatus (Rüppell, 1830) (Butterfly siltgoby)
- Amblygobius buanensis Herre, 1927 (Buan siltgoby)
- Amblygobius bynoensis (J. Richardson, 1844) (Bynoe siltgoby)
- Amblygobius calvatus G. R. Allen & Erdmann, 2016 (Bald-head siltgoby)
- Amblygobius cheraphilus G. R. Allen & Erdmann, 2016 (East Indies siltgoby)
- Amblygobius decussatus (Bleeker, 1855) (Orange-striped siltgoby)
- Amblygobius esakiae Herre, 1939 (Snout-spot siltgoby)
- Amblygobius linki Herre, 1927 (Link's siltgoby)
- Amblygobius nocturnus (Herre, 1945) (Nocturn siltgoby)
- Amblygobius phalaena (Valenciennes, 1837) (White-barred siltgoby)
- Amblygobius semicinctus (E. T. Bennett, 1833) (Half-barred siltgoby)
- Amblygobius sewardii (Playfair, 1867)
- Amblygobius sphynx (Valenciennes, 1837) (Sphinx siltgoby)
- Amblygobius stethophthalmus (Bleeker, 1851) (Freckled siltgoby)
- Amblygobius tekomaji (J. L. B. Smith, 1959)

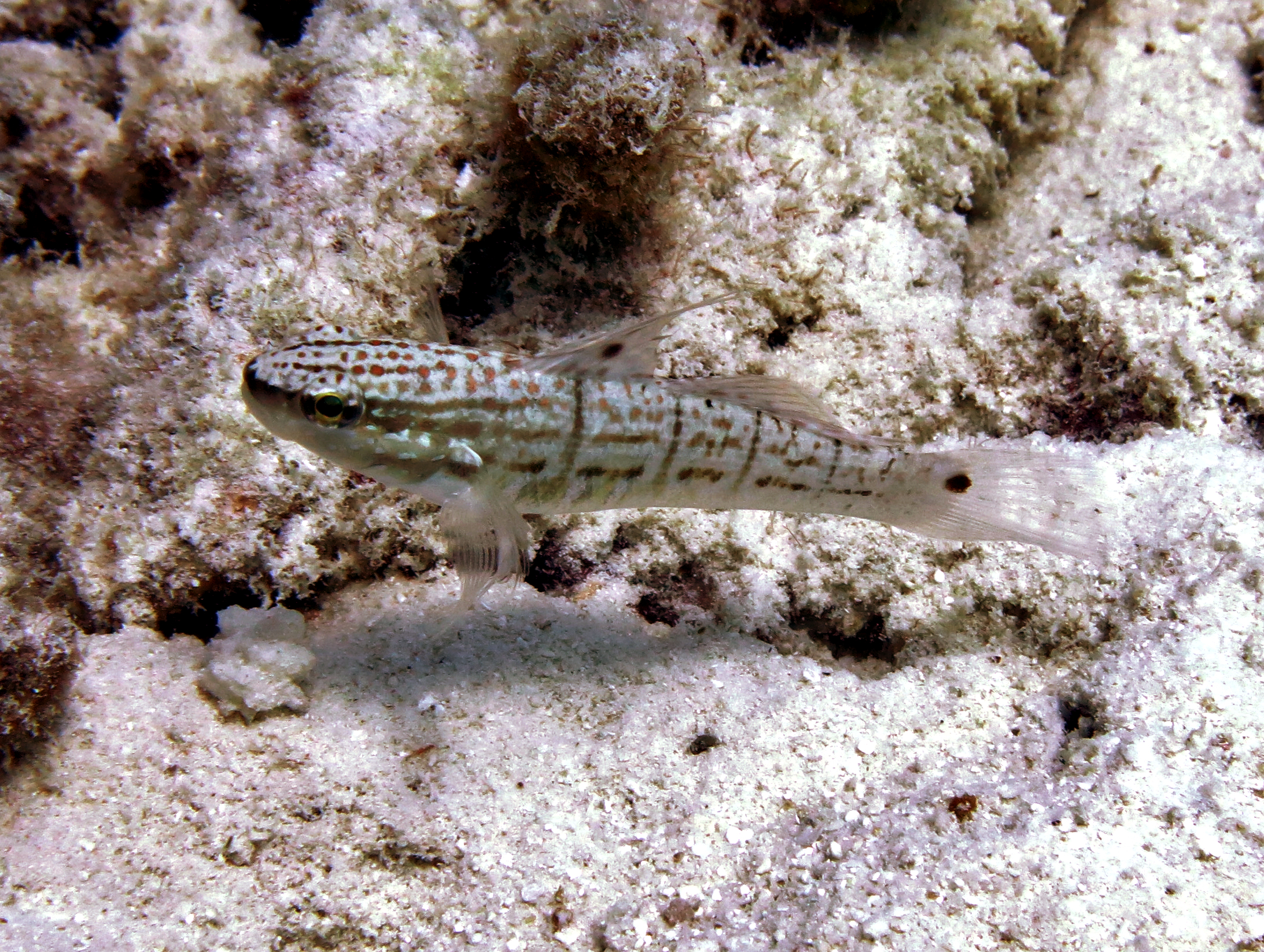
Amblygobius albimaculatus

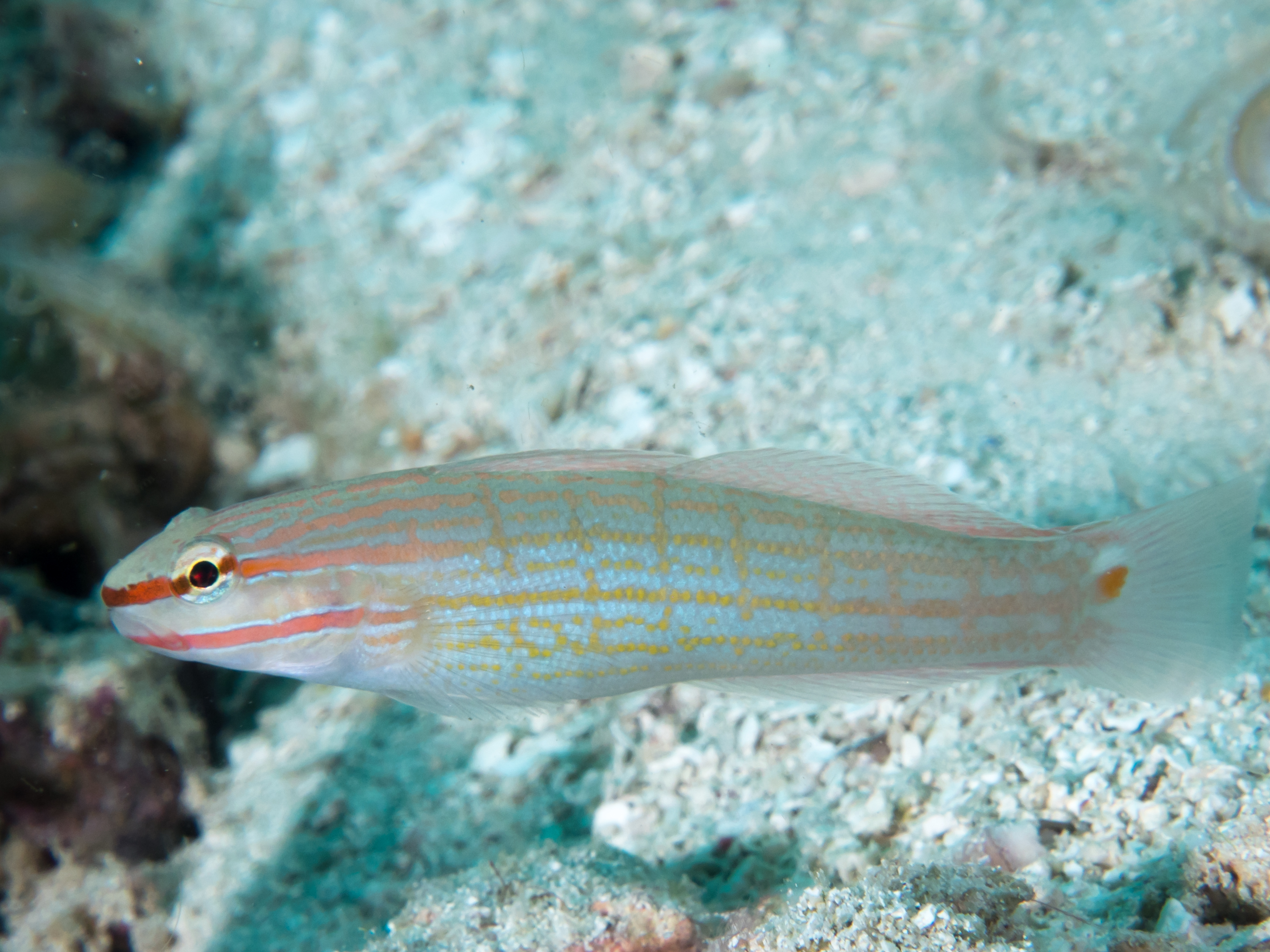
Amblygobius decussatus

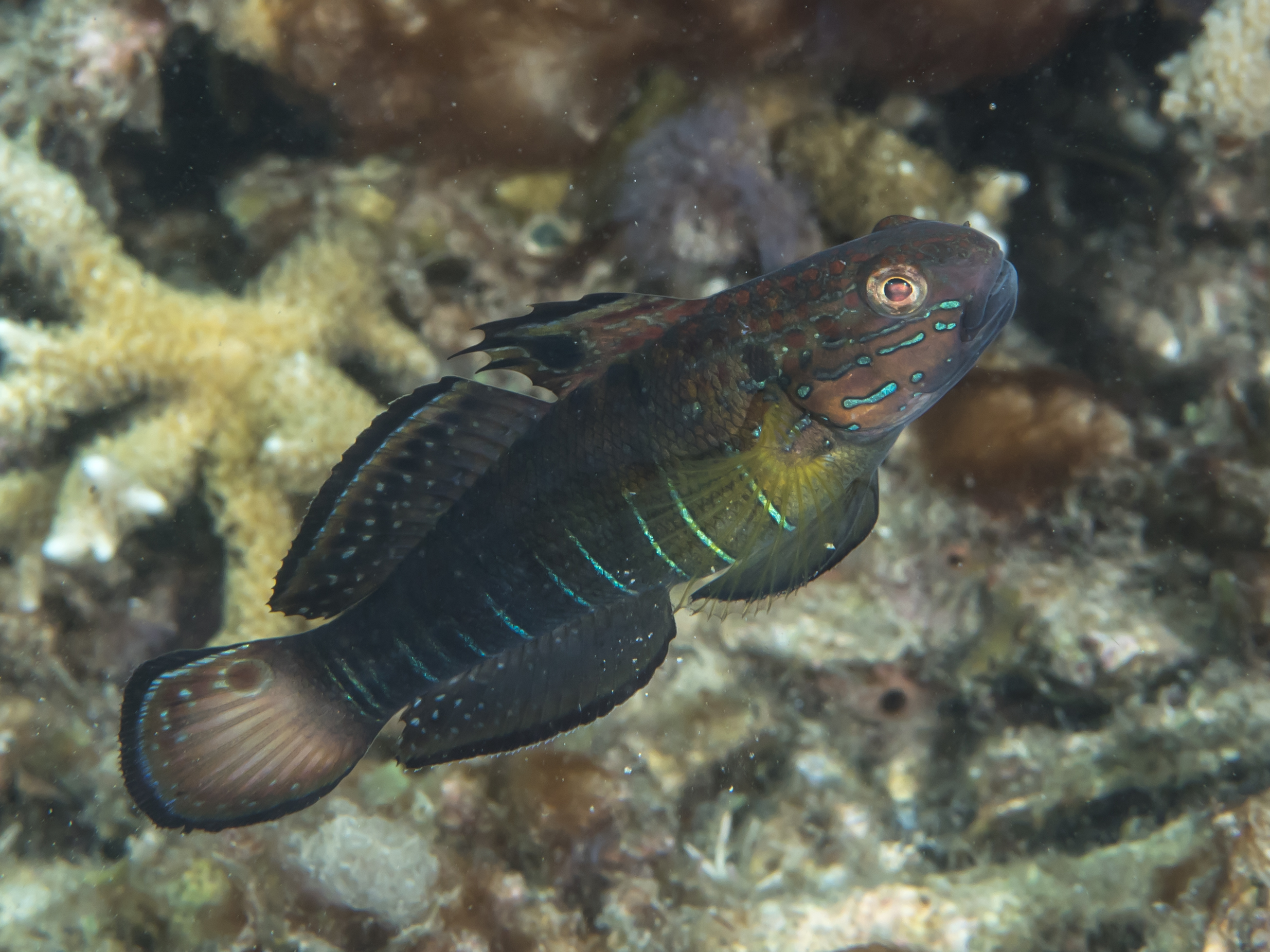
Amblygobius phalaena

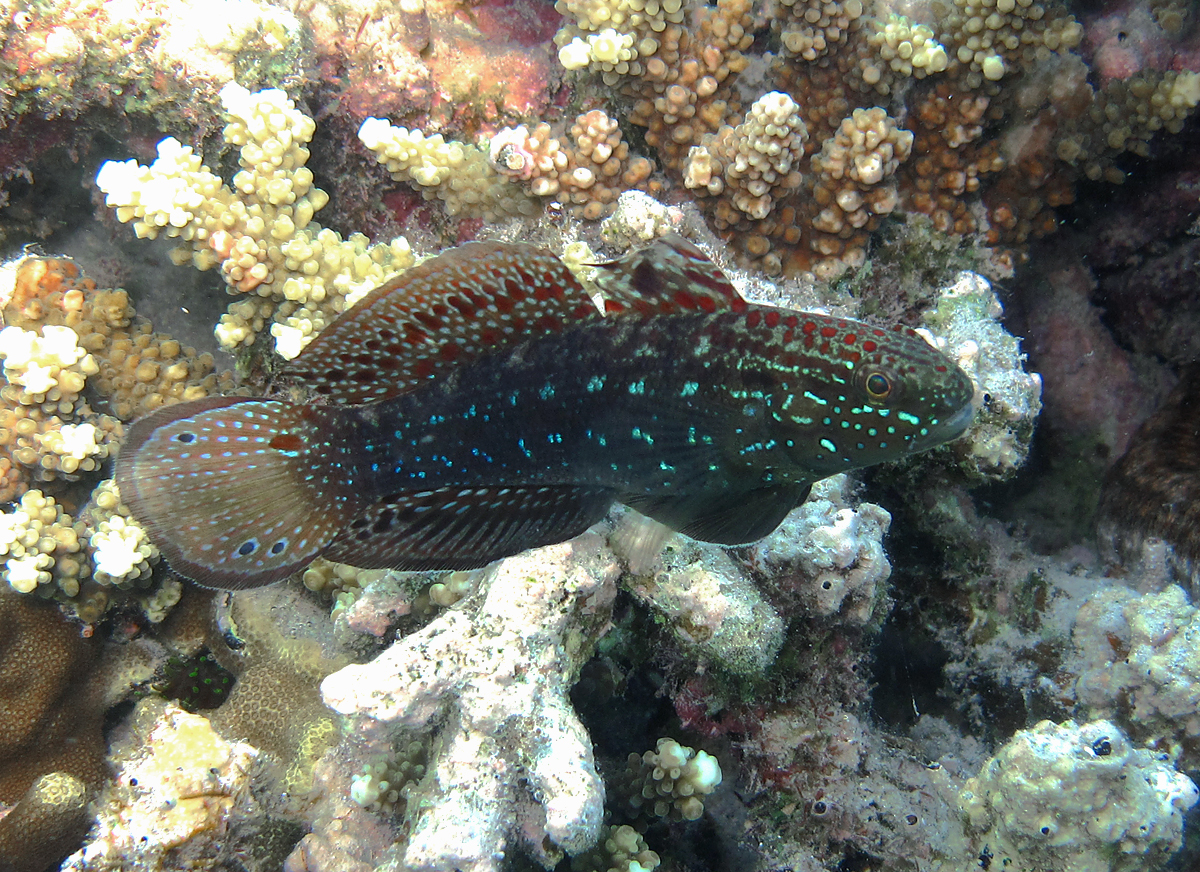
Amblygobius semicinctus

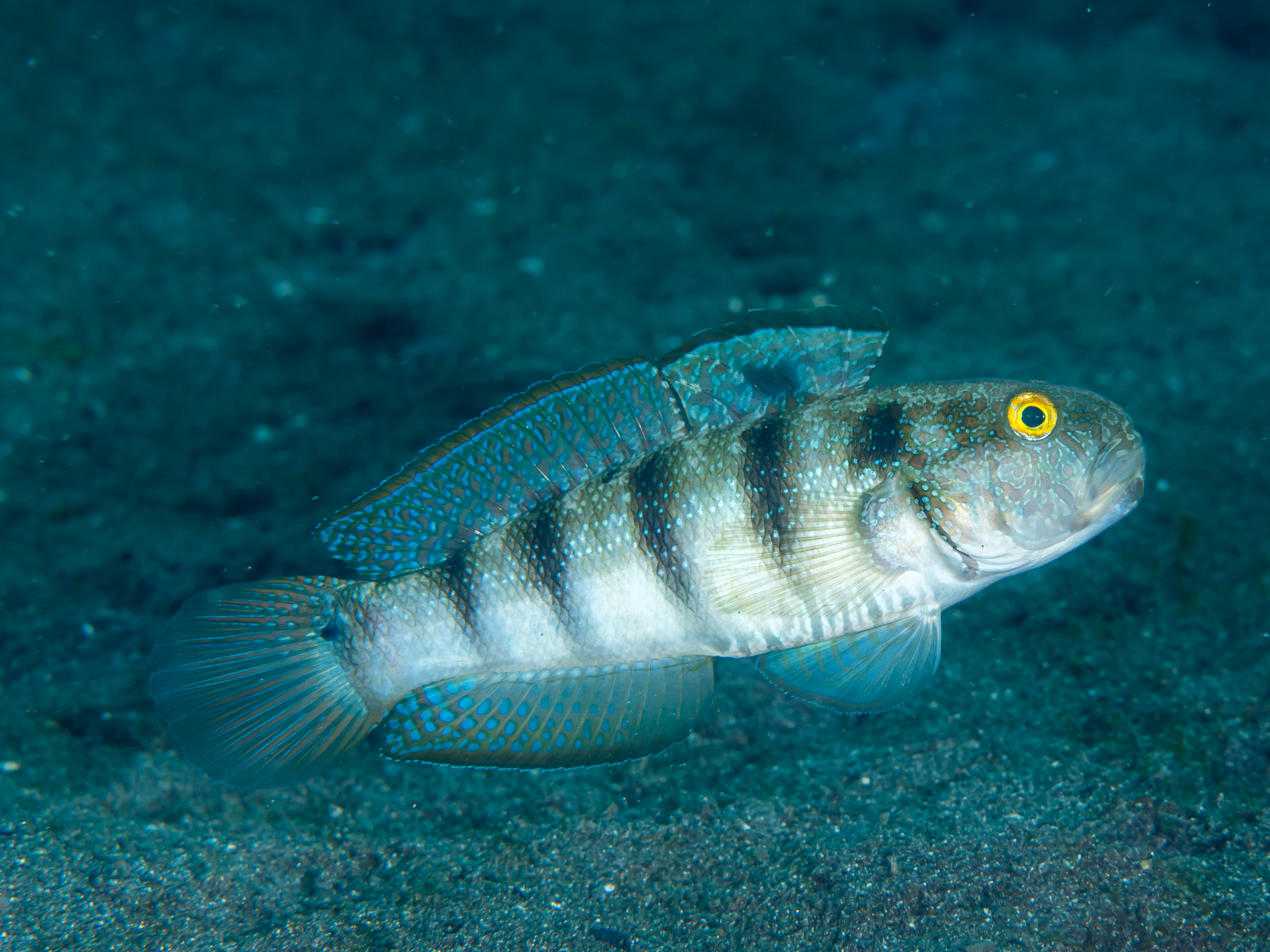
Amblygobius sphynx

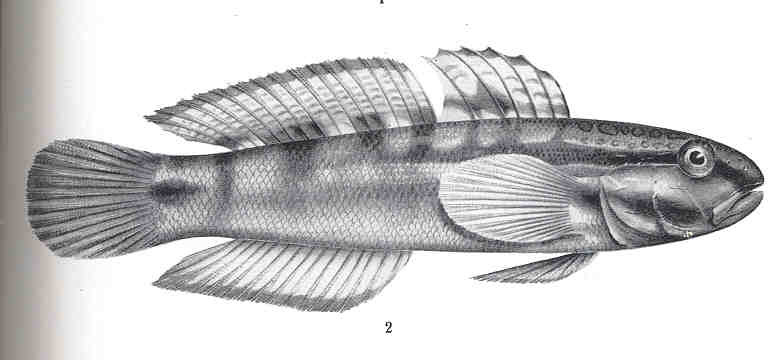
Amblygobius bynoeusis
