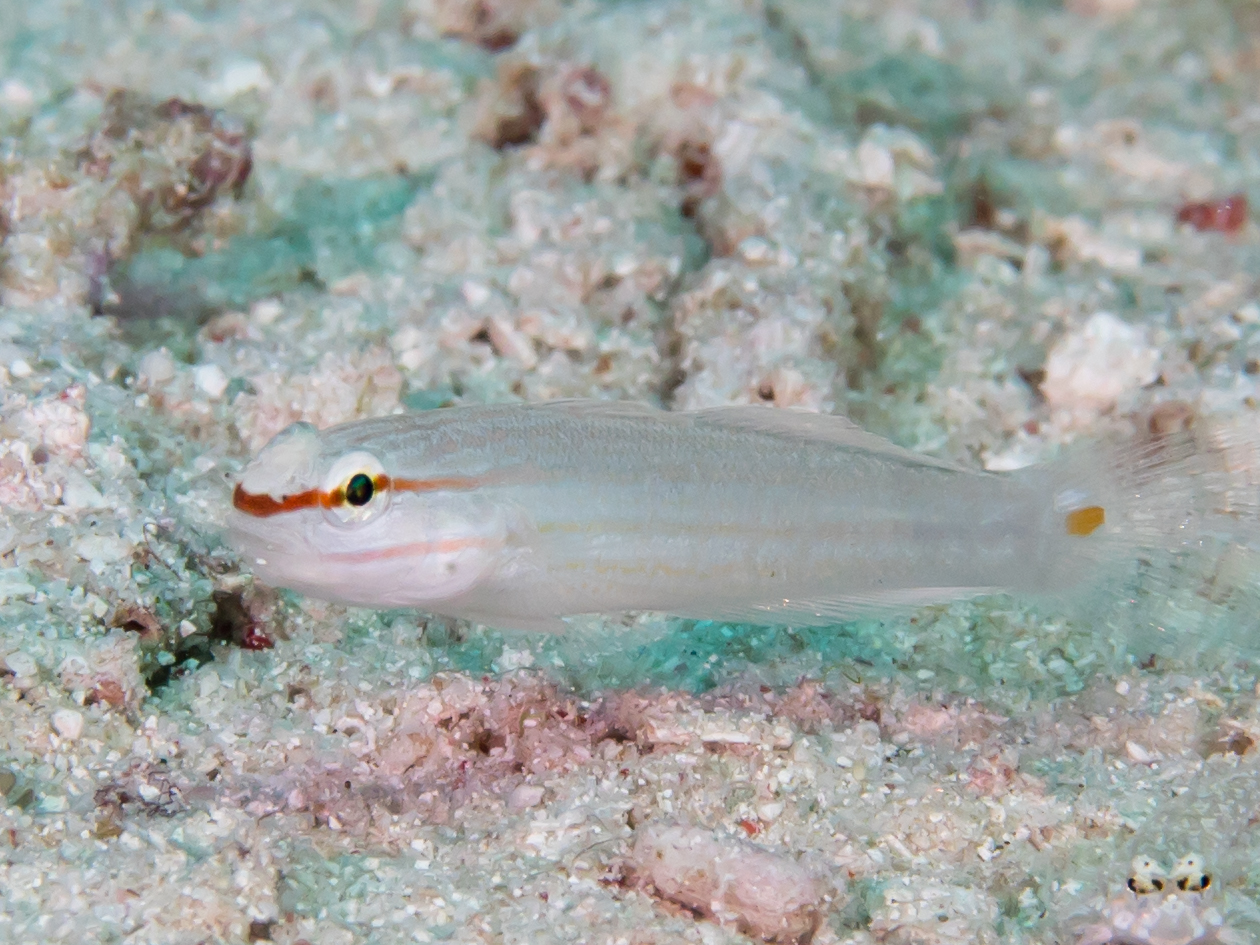
- Orange-striped goby (Amblygobius decussatus).

Scientific classification
- Kingdom: Animalia
- Phylum: Chordata
- Class: Actinopterygii
- Order: Gobiiformes
- Family: Gobiidae
- Genus: Amblygobius
- Species: A. decussatus

Binomial name
- Amblygobius decussatus (Bleeker, 1855)

Synonyms
- Gobius decussatus Bleeker, 1855

= Amblygobius decussatus =

Species of fish

Amblygobius decussatus, the orange-striped goby, is a species of goby native to tropical reefs in the western Pacific Ocean, but may be widespread in the central Indo-Pacific area. It prefers living on muddy substrates where it utilizes an invertebrate burrow for shelter. It sifts through mouthfuls of sand, consuming organic matter and small invertebrates contained therein. This species can reach a length of 9.5 centimetres (3.7 in) SL. It can also be found in the aquarium trade.
