= List of reef fish of the Red Sea =

These Red Sea fish are listed as Reef-associated by Fishbase:

- Acanthuridae
  - Acanthurus gahhm, Black surgeonfish
  - Acanthurus mata, Elongate surgeonfish
  - Acanthurus nigrofuscus, Brown surgeonfish
  - Acanthurus sohal, Sohal surgeonfish
  - Acanthurus tennentii, Doubleband surgeonfish
  - Acanthurus xanthopterus, Yellowfin surgeonfish
  - Ctenochaetus striatus, Striated surgeonfish
  - Naso annulatus, Whitemargin unicornfish
  - Naso brevirostris, Spotted unicornfish
  - Naso elegans, Elegant unicornfish
  - Naso hexacanthus, Sleek unicornfish
  - Naso unicornis, Bluespine unicornfish
  - Zebrasoma desjardinii, Red Sea sailfin tang
  - Zebrasoma xanthurum, Yellowtail tang
- Albulidae
  - Albula glossodonta, Roundjaw bonefish
- Alopiidae
  - Alopias pelagicus, Pelagic thresher
- Anomalopidae
  - Photoblepharon steinitzi, Flashlight fish
- Antennariidae
  - Antennarius coccineus, Scarlet frogfish
  - Antennarius commerson, Commerson's frogfish
  - Antennarius hispidus, Shaggy frogfish
  - Antennarius nummifer, Spotfin frogfish
  - Antennarius pictus, Painted frogfish
  - Antennarius rosaceus, Spiny-tufted frogfish
  - Antennarius striatus, Striated frogfish
  - Antennatus tuberosus, Tuberculated frogfish
  - Histrio histrio, Sargassum fish
- Apogonidae
  - Apogon angustatus, Broadstriped cardinalfish
  - Apogon annularis, Ringtail cardinalfish
  - Apogon aureus, Ring-tailed cardinalfish
  - Apogon bandanensis, Big-eyed cardinalfish
  - Apogon coccineus, Ruby cardinalfish
  - Apogon cookii, Cook's cardinalfish
  - Apogon cyanosoma, Yellow-striped cardinalfish
  - Apogon exostigma, Narrowstripe cardinalfish
  - Apogon fasciatus, Broad-banded cardinalfish
  - Apogon fleurieu, Cardinalfish
  - Apogon fraenatus, Bridled cardinalfish
  - Apogon guamensis, Guam cardinalfish
  - Apogon heptastygma
  - Apogon isus
  - Apogon kallopterus, Iridescent cardinalfish
  - Apogon kiensis, Rifle cardinal
  - Apogon lateralis, Humpback cardinal
  - Apogon latus
  - Apogon leptacanthus, Threadfin cardinalfish
  - Apogon multitaeniatus, Smallscale cardinal
  - Apogon nigripinnis, Bullseye
  - Apogon nigrofasciatus, Blackstripe cardinalfish
  - Apogon pselion
  - Apogon pseudotaeniatus, Doublebar cardinalfish
  - Apogon savayensis, Samoan cardinalfish
  - Apogon semiornatus, Oblique-banded cardinalfish
  - Apogon taeniatus, Twobelt cardinal
  - Apogon taeniophorus, Reef-flat cardinalfish
  - Apogon timorensis, Timor cardinalfish
  - Apogon truncatus, Flagfin cardinalfish
  - Apogon zebrinus
  - Apogonichthys perdix, Perdix cardinalfish
  - Archamia bilineata
  - Archamia fucata, Orange-lined cardinalfish
  - Archamia lineolata, Shimmering cardinal
  - Cheilodipterus arabicus, Tiger cardinal
  - Cheilodipterus lachneri
  - Cheilodipterus macrodon, Large toothed cardinalfish
  - Cheilodipterus quinquelineatus, Five-lined cardinalfish
  - Fowleria aurita, Crosseyed cardinalfish
  - Fowleria marmorata, Marbled cardinalfish
  - Fowleria punctulata, Spotcheek cardinalfish
  - Fowleria vaiulae, Mottled cardinalfish
  - Fowleria variegata, Variegated cardinalfish
  - Gymnapogon melanogaster
  - Neamia octospina, Eightspine cardinalfish
  - Pseudamia gelatinosa, Gelatinous cardinalfish
  - Rhabdamia cypselura, Swallowtail cardinalfish
  - Rhabdamia nigrimentum
- Atherinidae
  - Atherinomorus lacunosus, Hardyhead silverside
  - Hypoatherina barnesi, Barnes' silverside
  - Hypoatherina temminckii, Samoan silverside
- Balistidae
  - Abalistes stellatus
  - Balistapus undulatus, Orange-lined triggerfish
  - Balistoides viridescens, Titan triggerfish
  - Canthidermis maculata, Spotted oceanic triggerfish
  - Melichthys indicus, Indian triggerfish
  - Odonus niger, Redtoothed triggerfish
  - Pseudobalistes flavimarginatus, Yellowmargin triggerfish
  - Pseudobalistes fuscus, Yellow-spotted triggerfish
  - Rhinecanthus aculeatus, Blackbar triggerfish
  - Rhinecanthus assasi, Picasso triggerfish
  - Rhinecanthus rectangulus, Wedge-tail triggerfish
  - Rhinecanthus verrucosus, Blackbelly triggerfish
  - Sufflamen albicaudatum, Bluethroat triggerfish
  - Sufflamen fraenatum, Masked triggerfish
- Belonidae
  - Ablennes hians, Flat needlefish
  - Tylosurus acus melanotus, Keel-jawed needle fish
  - Tylosurus crocodilus crocodilus, Hound needlefish
- Blenniidae
  - Aspidontus dussumieri, Lance blenny
  - Aspidontus taeniatus, False cleanerfish
  - Aspidontus tractus
  - Atrosalarias fuscus fuscus
  - Blenniella cyanostigma, Striped rockskipper
  - Blenniella periophthalmus, Blue-dashed rockskipper
  - Cirripectes castaneus, Chestnut eyelash-blenny
  - Cirripectes filamentosus, Filamentous blenny
  - Ecsenius aroni, Aron's blenny
  - Ecsenius frontalis, Smooth-fin blenny
  - Ecsenius gravieri, Red Sea mimic blenny
  - Ecsenius midas, Persian blenny
  - Ecsenius nalolo, Nalolo
  - Enchelyurus kraussii, Krauss' blenny
  - Exallias brevis, Leopard blenny
  - Istiblennius edentulus, Rippled rockskipper
  - Istiblennius rivulatus
  - Meiacanthus nigrolineatus, Blackline fangblenny
  - Mimoblennius cirrosus, Fringed blenny
  - Omobranchus punctatus, Muzzled blenny
  - Petroscirtes mitratus, Floral blenny
  - Plagiotremus rhinorhynchos, Bluestriped fangblenny
  - Plagiotremus tapeinosoma, Piano fangblenny
  - Plagiotremus townsendi, Townsend's fangblenny
  - Salarias fasciatus, Jewelled blenny
- Bothidae
  - Asterorhombus intermedius, Intermediate flounder
  - Bothus mancus, Flowery flounder
  - Bothus pantherinus, Leopard flounder
  - Engyprosopon grandisquama, Largescale flounder
- Bythitidae
  - Brosmophyciops pautzkei, Slimy cuskeel
- Caesionidae
  - Caesio caerulaurea, Blue and gold fusilier
  - Caesio lunaris, Lunar fusilier
  - Caesio striata, Striated fusilier
  - Caesio suevica, Suez fusilier
  - Caesio varilineata, Variable-lined fusilier
  - Caesio xanthonota, Yellowback fusilier
  - Gymnocaesio gymnoptera, Slender fusilier
  - Pterocaesio chrysozona, Goldband fusilier
  - Pterocaesio pisang, Banana fusilier
- Callionymidae
  - Callionymus delicatulus, Delicate dragonet
  - Callionymus flavus
- Carangidae
  - Alectis ciliaris, African pompano
  - Alectis indicus, Indian threadfish
  - Alepes djedaba, Shrimp scad
  - Atule mate, Yellowtail scad
  - Carangoides armatus, Longfin trevally
  - Carangoides bajad, Orangespotted trevally
  - Carangoides chrysophrys, Longnose trevally
  - Carangoides coeruleopinnatus, Coastal trevally
  - Carangoides dinema, Shadow trevally
  - Carangoides ferdau, Blue trevally
  - Carangoides fulvoguttatus, Yellowspotted trevally
  - Carangoides gymnostethus, Bludger
  - Carangoides malabaricus, Malabar trevally
  - Carangoides orthogrammus, Island trevally
  - Carangoides plagiotaenia, Barcheek trevally
  - Caranx ignobilis, Giant trevally
  - Caranx melampygus, Bluefin trevally
  - Caranx sexfasciatus, Bigeye trevally
  - Decapterus macrosoma, Shortfin scad
  - Elagatis bipinnulata, Rainbow runner
  - Gnathanodon speciosus, Golden trevally
  - Megalaspis cordyla, Torpedo scad
  - Naucrates ductor, Pilotfish
  - Parastromateus niger, Black pomfret
  - Scomberoides commersonnianus, Talang queenfish
  - Scomberoides lysan, Doublespotted queenfish
  - Scomberoides tol, Needlescaled queenfish
  - Selar crumenophthalmus, Bigeye scad
  - Seriola dumerili, Greater amberjack
  - Seriolina nigrofasciata, Blackbanded trevally
  - Trachinotus baillonii, Smallspotted dart
  - Trachinotus blochii, Snubnose pompano
  - Trachurus indicus, Arabian scad
  - Ulua mentalis, Longrakered trevally
  - Uraspis helvola, Whitemouth jack
  - Uraspis uraspis, Whitetongue jack
- Carapidae
  - Encheliophis gracilis, Graceful pearlfish
  - Encheliophis homei, Silver pearlfish
- Carcharhinidae
  - Carcharhinus albimarginatus, Silvertip shark
  - Carcharhinus altimus, Bignose shark
  - Carcharhinus brevipinna, Spinner shark
  - Carcharhinus falciformis, Silky shark
  - Carcharhinus limbatus, Blacktip shark
  - Carcharhinus longimanus, Oceanic whitetip shark
  - Carcharhinus melanopterus, Blacktip reef shark
  - Carcharhinus plumbeus, Sandbar shark
  - Carcharhinus sorrah, Spottail shark
  - Galeocerdo cuvier, Tiger shark
  - Negaprion acutidens, Sicklefin lemon shark
  - Triaenodon obesus, Whitetip reef shark
- Centriscidae
  - Aeoliscus punctulatus, Speckled shrimpfish
  - Centriscus scutatus, Grooved razor-fish
- Chaetodontidae
  - Chaetodon auriga, Threadfin butterflyfish
  - Chaetodon austriacus, Blacktail butterflyfish
  - Chaetodon citrinellus, Speckled butterflyfish
  - Chaetodon collare, Redtail butterflyfish
  - Chaetodon falcula, Blackwedged butterflyfish
  - Chaetodon fasciatus, Diagonal butterflyfish
  - Chaetodon guttatissimus, Peppered butterflyfish
  - Chaetodon kleinii, Sunburst butterflyfish
  - Chaetodon larvatus, Hooded butterflyfish
  - Chaetodon leucopleura, Somali butterflyfish
  - Chaetodon lineolatus, Lined butterflyfish
  - Chaetodon melannotus, Blackback butterflyfish
  - Chaetodon melapterus, Arabian butterflyfish
  - Chaetodon mesoleucos, White-face butterflyfish
  - Chaetodon paucifasciatus, Eritrean butterflyfish
  - Chaetodon semilarvatus, Bluecheek butterflyfish
  - Chaetodon trifascialis, Chevron butterflyfish
  - Chaetodon trifasciatus, Melon butterflyfish
  - Chaetodon vagabundus, Vagabond butterflyfish
  - Forcipiger flavissimus
  - Forcipiger longirostris, Longnose butterflyfish
  - Heniochus intermedius, Red Sea bannerfish
  - Heniochus monoceros, Masked bannerfish
- Chirocentridae
  - Chirocentrus dorab, Dorab wolf-herring
- Cirrhitidae
  - Cirrhitichthys calliurus, Spottedtail hawkfish
  - Cirrhitichthys oxycephalus, Coral hawkfish
  - Cirrhitus pinnulatus, Stocky hawkfish
  - Oxycirrhites typus, Longnose hawkfish
  - Paracirrhites forsteri, Blackside hawkfish
- Clupeidae
  - Amblygaster sirm, Spotted sardinella
  - Herklotsichthys quadrimaculatus, Bluestripe herring
  - Sardinella albella, White sardinella
  - Sardinella gibbosa, Goldstripe sardinella
  - Spratelloides delicatulus, Delicate round herring
- Congridae
  - Ariosoma balearicum, Bandtooth conger
  - Ariosoma scheelei, Tropical conger
  - Conger cinereus, Longfin African conger
  - Heteroconger hassi, Spotted garden eel
- Dactylopteridae
  - Dactyloptena orientalis, Oriental flying gurnard
- Dasyatidae
  - Dasyatis kuhlii, Bluespotted stingray
  - Himantura uarnak, Honeycomb stingray
  - Pastinachus sephen, Cowtail stingray
  - Taeniura lymma, Bluespotted ribbontail ray
  - Taeniura meyeni, Blotched fantail ray
  - Urogymnus asperrimus, Porcupine ray
- Diodontidae
  - Cyclichthys orbicularis, Birdbeak burrfish
  - Cyclichthys spilostylus, Spotbase burrfish
  - Diodon holocanthus, Long-spine porcupinefish
  - Diodon hystrix, Spot-fin porcupinefish
  - Diodon liturosus, Black-blotched porcupinefish
- Drepaneidae
  - Drepane longimana, Concertina fish
  - Drepane punctata, Spotted sicklefish
- Echeneidae
  - Echeneis naucrates, Live sharksucker
  - Remora remora, Common remora
- Engraulidae
  - Encrasicholina heteroloba, Shorthead anchovy
  - Encrasicholina punctifer, Buccaneer anchovy
  - Thryssa baelama, Baelama anchovy
- Ephippidae
  - Platax orbicularis, Orbicular batfish
  - Platax teira, Tiera batfish
  - Tripterodon orbis, African spadefish
- Fistulariidae
  - Fistularia commersonii, Bluespotted cornetfish
  - Fistularia petimba, Red cornetfish
- Gerreidae
  - Gerres argyreus, Common mojarra
  - Gerres longirostris, Longtail silverbiddy
  - Gerres oblongus, Slender silverbiddy
  - Gerres oyena, Common silver-biddy
- Ginglymostomatidae
  - Nebrius ferrugineus, Tawny nurse shark
- Gobiesocidae
  - Lepadichthys lineatus, Doubleline clingfish
- Gobiidae
  - Amblyeleotris diagonalis
  - Amblyeleotris periophthalma, Periophthalma prawn-goby
  - Amblyeleotris steinitzi, Steinitz' prawn goby
  - Amblyeleotris sungami, Magnus' prawn-goby
  - Amblyeleotris wheeleri, Gorgeous prawn-goby
  - Amblygobius albimaculatus, Butterfly goby
  - Amblygobius esakiae, Snoutspot goby
  - Amblygobius hectori, Hector's goby
  - Amblygobius nocturnus, Nocturn goby
  - Asterropteryx ensifera, Miller's damsel
  - Asterropteryx semipunctata, Starry goby
  - Bathygobius cyclopterus, Spotted frillgoby
  - Bathygobius fuscus, Dusky frillgoby
  - Bryaninops erythrops, Erythrops goby
  - Bryaninops loki, Loki whip-goby
  - Bryaninops natans, Redeye goby
  - Bryaninops ridens, Ridens goby
  - Bryaninops yongei, Whip coral goby
  - Callogobius bifasciatus, Doublebar goby
  - Callogobius maculipinnis, Ostrich goby
  - Cryptocentrus caeruleopunctatus, Harlequin prawn-goby
  - Cryptocentrus cryptocentrus, Ninebar prawn-goby
  - Cryptocentrus fasciatus, Y-bar shrimp goby
  - Cryptocentrus lutheri, Luther's prawn-goby
  - Ctenogobiops crocineus, Silverspot shrimpgoby
  - Ctenogobiops feroculus, Sandy prawn-goby
  - Ctenogobiops maculosus
  - Discordipinna griessingeri, Spikefin goby
  - Eviota distigma, Twospot pygmy goby
  - Eviota guttata, Spotted pygmy goby
  - Eviota pardalota, Leopard dwarfgoby
  - Eviota prasina, Green bubble goby
  - Eviota sebreei, Sebree's pygmy goby
  - Eviota zebrina
  - Exyrias belissimus, Mud reef-goby
  - Flabelligobius latruncularia, Fan shrimp-goby
  - Fusigobius longispinus, Orange-spotted sand-goby
  - Fusigobius neophytus, Common fusegoby
  - Gladiogobius ensifer, Gladiator goby
  - Gnatholepis anjerensis
  - Gnatholepis cauerensis cauerensis, Eyebar goby
  - Gobiodon citrinus, Poison goby
  - Gobiodon reticulatus, Reticulate goby
  - Istigobius decoratus, Decorated goby
  - Istigobius ornatus, Ornate goby
  - Luposicya lupus
  - Oplopomus oplopomus, Spinecheek goby
  - Oxyurichthys papuensis, Frogface goby
  - Palutrus meteori, Meteor goby
  - Paragobiodon echinocephalus, Redhead goby
  - Paragobiodon xanthosomus, Emerald coral goby
  - Periophthalmus argentilineatus, Barred mudskipper
  - Pleurosicya mossambica, Toothy goby
  - Priolepis cinctus, Girdled goby
  - Priolepis randalli, Randall's goby
  - Priolepis semidoliata, Half-barred goby
  - Trimma avidori
  - Trimma barralli
  - Trimma fishelsoni
  - Trimma flavicaudatus
  - Trimma mendelssohni
  - Trimma sheppardi
  - Trimma taylori, Yellow cave goby
  - Trimma tevegae, Blue-striped cave goby
  - Valenciennea helsdingenii, Twostripe goby
  - Valenciennea puellaris, Maiden goby
  - Valenciennea sexguttata, Sixspot goby
  - Valenciennea wardii, Ward's sleeper
  - Vanderhorstia delagoae, Candystick goby
  - Vanderhorstia mertensi, Mertens' prawn-goby
  - Yongeichthys nebulosus, Shadow goby
- Haemulidae
  - Diagramma pictum, Painted sweetlips
  - Plectorhinchus albovittatus, Two-striped sweetlips
  - Plectorhinchus flavomaculatus, Lemon sweetlip
  - Plectorhinchus gaterinus, Blackspotted rubberlip
  - Plectorhinchus gibbosus, Harry hotlips
  - Plectorhinchus harrawayi
  - Plectorhinchus nigrus
  - Plectorhinchus obscurus, Giant sweetlips
  - Plectorhinchus playfairi, Whitebarred rubberlip
  - Plectorhinchus schotaf, Minstrel sweetlip
  - Plectorhinchus sordidus, Sordid rubberlip
  - Plectorhinchus umbrinus
  - Pomadasys commersonnii, Smallspotted grunter
  - Pomadasys furcatus, Banded grunter
  - Pomadasys kaakan, Javelin grunter
  - Pomadasys maculatus, Saddle grunt
  - Pomadasys olivaceus, Olive grunt
  - Pomadasys stridens, Striped piggy
- Hemiramphidae
  - Hemiramphus far, Blackbarred halfbeak
  - Hyporhamphus affinis, Tropical halfbeak
  - Hyporhamphus balinensis, Balinese garfish
  - Hyporhamphus gamberur, Red Sea halfbeak
- Holocentridae
  - Myripristis berndti, Blotcheye soldierfish
  - Myripristis hexagona, Doubletooth soldierfish
  - Myripristis murdjan, Pinecone soldierfish
  - Myripristis xanthacra, Yellowtip soldierfish
  - Neoniphon sammara, Sammara squirrelfish
  - Sargocentron caudimaculatum, Silverspot squirrelfish
  - Adioryx diadema, Crown squirrelfish
  - Sargocentron inaequalis, Lattice squirrelfish
  - Sargocentron ittodai, Samurai squirrelfish
  - Sargocentron macrosquamis, Bigscale squirrelfish
  - Sargocentron melanospilos, Blackblotch squirrelfish
  - Sargocentron punctatissimum, Speckled squirrelfish
  - Sargocentron rubrum, Redcoat
  - Sargocentron spiniferum, Sabre squirrelfish
- Kuhliidae
  - Kuhlia mugil, Barred flagtail
- Kyphosidae
  - Kyphosus bigibbus, Grey sea chub
  - Kyphosus cinerascens, Blue seachub
  - Kyphosus vaigiensis, Brassy chub
- Labridae
  - Anampses caeruleopunctatus, Bluespotted wrasse
  - Anampses lineatus, Lined wrasse
  - Anampses meleagrides, Spotted wrasse
  - Anampses twistii, Yellowbreasted wrasse
  - Bodianus anthioides, Lyretail hogfish
  - Bodianus axillaris, Axilspot hogfish
  - Bodianus diana, Diana's hogfish
  - Bodianus opercularis, Blackspot hogfish
  - Cheilinus fasciatus, Redbreast wrasse
  - Cheilinus lunulatus, Broomtail wrasse
  - Cheilinus undulatus, Humphead wrasse
  - Cheilio inermis, Cigar wrasse
  - Choerodon robustus, Robust tuskfish
  - Cirrhilabrus blatteus, Purple-boned wrasse
  - Cirrhilabrus rubriventralis, Social wrasse
  - Coris aygula, Clown coris
  - Coris caudimacula, Spottail coris
  - Coris cuvieri, African coris
  - Coris formosa, Queen coris
  - Coris variegata, Dapple coris
  - Epibulus insidiator, Slingjaw wrasse
  - Gomphosus caeruleus, Green birdmouth wrasse
  - Halichoeres hortulanus, Checkerboard wrasse
  - Halichoeres iridis
  - Halichoeres margaritaceus, Pink-belly wrasse
  - Halichoeres marginatus, Dusky wrasse
  - Halichoeres nebulosus, Nebulous wrasse
  - Halichoeres scapularis, Zigzag wrasse
  - Halichoeres zeylonicus, Goldstripe wrasse
  - Hemigymnus fasciatus, Barred thicklip
  - Hemigymnus melapterus, Blackeye thicklip
  - Hologymnosus annulatus, Ring wrasse
  - Iniistius pavo, Peacock wrasse
  - Labroides dimidiatus, Bluestreak cleaner wrasse
  - Larabicus quadrilineatus, Fourline wrasse
  - Macropharyngodon bipartitus bipartitus, Vermiculate wrasse
  - Macropharyngodon bipartitus marisrubri
  - Minilabrus striatus, Minute wrasse
  - Novaculichthys macrolepidotus, Seagrass wrasse
  - Novaculichthys taeniourus, Rockmover wrasse
  - Oxycheilinus arenatus, Speckled maori wrasse
  - Oxycheilinus bimaculatus, Two-spot wrasse
  - Oxycheilinus digramma, Cheeklined wrasse
  - Oxycheilinus mentalis, Mental wrasse
  - Paracheilinus octotaenia, Red Sea eightline flasher
  - Pseudocheilinus evanidus, Striated wrasse
  - Pseudocheilinus hexataenia, Sixline wrasse
  - Pseudodax moluccanus, Chiseltooth wrasse
  - Pteragogus cryptus, Cryptic wrasse
  - Pteragogus flagellifer, Cocktail wrasse
  - Stethojulis albovittata, Bluelined wrasse
  - Stethojulis interrupta, Cutribbon wrasse
  - Stethojulis strigiventer, Three-ribbon wrasse
  - Stethojulis trilineata, Three-lined rainbowfish
  - Thalassoma hebraicum, Goldbar wrasse
  - Thalassoma lunare, Moon wrasse
  - Thalassoma purpureum, Surge wrasse
  - Thalassoma rueppellii, Klunzinger's wrasse
  - Thalassoma trilobatum, Christmas wrasse
  - Wetmorella nigropinnata, Sharpnose wrasse
  - Xyrichtys melanopus, Yellowpatch razorfish
  - Xyrichtys pentadactylus, Fivefinger wrasse
- Lamnidae
  - Carcharodon carcharias, Great white shark
  - Isurus oxyrinchus, Shortfin mako
- Lethrinidae
  - Gymnocranius grandoculis, Blue-lined large-eye bream
  - Gymnocranius griseus, Grey large-eye bream
  - Lethrinus borbonicus, Snubnose emperor
  - Lethrinus erythracanthus, Orange-spotted emperor
  - Lethrinus harak, Thumbprint emperor
  - Lethrinus lentjan, Pink ear emperor
  - Lethrinus mahsena, Sky emperor
  - Lethrinus microdon, Smalltooth emperor
  - Lethrinus nebulosus, Spangled emperor
  - Lethrinus obsoletus, Orange-striped emperor
  - Lethrinus olivaceus, Longface emperor
  - Lethrinus variegatus, Slender emperor
  - Lethrinus xanthochilus, Yellowlip emperor
  - Monotaxis grandoculis, Humpnose big-eye bream
- Lutjanidae
  - Aphareus furca, Small toothed jobfish
  - Aphareus rutilans, Rusty jobfish
  - Aprion virescens, Green jobfish
  - Lutjanus argentimaculatus, Mangrove red snapper
  - Lutjanus bengalensis, Bengal snapper
  - Lutjanus bohar, Two-spot red snapper
  - Lutjanus coeruleolineatus, Blueline snapper
  - Lutjanus ehrenbergii, Blackspot snapper
  - Lutjanus erythropterus, Crimson snapper
  - Lutjanus fulviflamma, Dory snapper
  - Lutjanus fulvus, Blacktail snapper
  - Lutjanus gibbus, Humpback red snapper
  - Lutjanus johnii, John's snapper
  - Lutjanus kasmira, Common bluestripe snapper
  - Lutjanus lemniscatus, Yellowstreaked snapper
  - Lutjanus lutjanus, Bigeye snapper
  - Lutjanus malabaricus, Malabar blood snapper
  - Lutjanus monostigma, Onespot snapper
  - Lutjanus quinquelineatus, Five-lined snapper
  - Lutjanus rivulatus, Blubberlip snapper
  - Lutjanus russellii, Russell's snapper
  - Lutjanus sanguineus, Humphead snapper
  - Lutjanus sebae, Emperor red snapper
  - Macolor niger, Black and white snapper
  - Paracaesio sordida, Dirty ordure snapper
  - Paracaesio xanthura, Yellowtail blue snapper
  - Pinjalo pinjalo, Pinjalo
- Malacanthidae
  - Malacanthus brevirostris, Quakerfish
  - Malacanthus latovittatus, Blue blanquillo
- Menidae
  - Mene maculata, Moonfish
- Microdesmidae
  - Gunnellichthys monostigma, Onespot wormfish
- Monacanthidae
  - Aluterus monoceros, Unicorn leatherjacket
  - Aluterus scriptus, Scrawled filefish
  - Amanses scopas, Broom filefish
  - Cantherhines dumerilii, Whitespotted filefish
  - Cantherhines pardalis, Honeycomb filefish
  - Oxymonacanthus halli, Red Sea longnose filefish
  - Paramonacanthus japonicus, Hairfinned leatherjacket
  - Pervagor randalli
  - Thamnaconus modestoides, Modest filefish
  - Monocentris japonica, Pineconefish
- Monodactylidae
  - Monodactylus falciformis, Full moony
- Mugilidae
  - Crenimugil crenilabis, Fringelip mullet
  - Liza viagiensis, Squaretail mullet
  - Oedalechilus labiosus, Hornlip mullet
  - Valamugil seheli, Bluespot mullet
- Mullidae
  - Mulloidichthys flavolineatus, Yellowstripe goatfish
  - Mulloidichthys vanicolensis, Yellowfin goatfish
  - Parupeneus cyclostomus, Goldsaddle goatfish
  - Parupeneus forsskali, Red Sea goatfish
  - Parupeneus heptacanthus, Cinnabar goatfish
  - Parupeneus indicus, Indian goatfish
  - Parupeneus macronemus, Longbarbel goatfish
  - Parupeneus rubescens, Rosy goatfish
  - Upeneus moluccensis, Goldband goatfish
  - Upeneus tragula, Freckled goatfish
  - Upeneus vittatus, Yellowstriped goatfish
- Muraenidae
  - Echidna nebulosa, Snowflake moray
  - Echidna polyzona, Barred moray
  - Gymnomuraena zebra, Zebra moray
  - Gymnothorax buroensis, Vagrant moray
  - Gymnothorax elegans, Elegant moray
  - Gymnothorax favagineus, Laced moray
  - Gymnothorax flavimarginatus, Yellow-edged moray
  - Gymnothorax griseus, Geometric moray
  - Gymnothorax hepaticus, Liver-colored moray eel
  - Gymnothorax javanicus, Giant moray
  - Gymnothorax meleagris, Turkey moray
  - Gymnothorax moluccensis, Moluccan moray
  - Gymnothorax monochrous, Drab moray
  - Gymnothorax nudivomer, Starry moray
  - Gymnothorax pictus, Peppered moray
  - Gymnothorax pindae, Pinda moray
  - Gymnothorax punctatofasciatus, Bars'n spots moray
  - Gymnothorax punctatus, Red Sea whitespotted moray
  - Gymnothorax rueppelliae, Banded moray
  - Gymnothorax undulatus, Undulated moray
  - Strophidon sathete, Slender giant moray
  - Uropterygius concolor, Unicolor snake moray
  - Uropterygius polyspilus, Large-spotted snake moray
- Myliobatidae
  - Aetobatus narinari, Spotted eagle ray
- Nemipteridae
  - Scolopsis bimaculatus, Thumbprint monocle bream
  - Scolopsis ghanam, Arabian monocle bream
  - Scolopsis taeniatus, Black-streaked monocle bream
  - Scolopsis vosmeri, Whitecheek monocle bream
- Odontaspididae
  - Carcharias taurus, Sand tiger shark
- Ophichthidae
  - Brachysomophis cirrocheilos, Stargazer snake eel
  - Callechelys catostoma, Black-striped snake eel
  - Callechelys marmorata, Marbled snake eel
  - Lamnostoma orientalis, Oriental worm-eel
  - Muraenichthys schultzei, Maimed snake eel
  - Myrichthys colubrinus, Harlequin snake eel
  - Myrichthys maculosus, Tiger snake eel
  - Ophichthus erabo, Fowler's snake eel
  - Phaenomonas cooperae, Short-maned sand-eel
  - Pisodonophis cancrivorus, Longfin snake-eel
  - Scolecenchelys gymnota, Slender worm eel
  - Scolecenchelys laticaudata, Redfin worm-eel
- Ophidiidae
  - Brotula multibarbata, Goatsbeard brotula
- Opistognathidae
  - Opistognathus muscatensis, Robust jawfish
- Ostraciidae
  - Lactoria cornuta, Longhorn cowfish
  - Ostracion cubicus, Yellow boxfish
  - Ostracion cyanurus, Bluetail trunkfish
  - Tetrosomus gibbosus, Humpback turretfish
- Pegasidae
  - Eurypegasus draconis, Short dragonfish
- Pempheridae
  - Parapriacanthus ransonneti, Pigmy sweeper
  - Pempheris oualensis, Silver sweeper
  - Pempheris schwenkii, Black-stripe sweeper
  - Pempheris vanicolensis, Vanikoro sweeper
- Pentacerotidae
  - Histiopterus typus, Sailfin armourhead
- Pinguipedidae
  - Parapercis hexophtalma, Speckled sandperch
- Platycephalidae
  - Cociella punctata, Spotted flathead
  - Papilloculiceps longiceps, Tentacled flathead
  - Platycephalus indicus, Bartail flathead
  - Thysanophrys chiltonae, Longsnout flathead
- Plesiopidae
  - Calloplesiops altivelis, Comet
  - Plesiops coeruleolineatus, Crimsontip longfin
  - Plesiops nigricans, Whitespotted longfin
- Plotosidae
  - Plotosus lineatus, Striped eel catfish
- Pomacanthidae
  - Apolemichthys xanthotis, Yellow-ear angelfish
  - Centropyge bicolor, Bicolor angelfish
  - Centropyge multispinis, Dusky angelfish
  - Genicanthus caudovittatus, Zebra angelfish
  - Pomacanthus asfur, Arabian angelfish
  - Pomacanthus imperator, Emperor angelfish
  - Pomacanthus maculosus, Yellowbar angelfish
  - Pomacanthus semicirculatus, Semicircle angelfish
  - Pygoplites diacanthus, Royal angelfish
- Pomacentridae
  - Abudefduf bengalensis, Bengal sergeant
  - Abudefduf septemfasciatus, Banded sergeant
  - Abudefduf sexfasciatus, Scissortail sergeant
  - Abudefduf sordidus, Blackspot sergeant
  - Abudefduf vaigiensis, Indo-Pacific sergeant(Quoy and Gaimard, 1825)
  - Amblyglyphidodon flavilatus, Yellowfin damsel
  - Amblyglyphidodon indicus, Pale damselfish
  - Amblyglyphidodon leucogaster, Yellowbelly damselfish
  - Amphiprion bicinctus, Twoband anemonefish
  - Chromis dimidiata, Chocolatedip chromis
  - Chromis flavaxilla, Arabian chromis
  - Chromis nigrura, Blacktail chromis
  - Chromis pelloura, Duskytail chromis
  - Chromis pembae, Pemba chromis
  - Chromis ternatensis, Ternate chromis
  - Chromis trialpha, Trispot chromis
  - Chromis viridis, Blue green damselfish
  - Chromis weberi, Weber's chromis
  - Chrysiptera annulata, Footballer demoiselle
  - Chrysiptera biocellata, Twinspot damselfish
  - Chrysiptera unimaculata, One-spot demoiselle
  - Dascyllus aruanus, Whitetail dascyllus
  - Dascyllus marginatus, Marginate dascyllus
  - Dascyllus trimaculatus, Threespot dascyllus
  - Neoglyphidodon melas, Bowtie damselfish
  - Neopomacentrus cyanomos, Regal demoiselle
  - Neopomacentrus miryae, Miry's demoiselle
  - Neopomacentrus xanthurus, Red Sea demoiselle
  - Plectroglyphidodon lacrymatus, Whitespotted devil
  - Plectroglyphidodon leucozonus, Singlebar devil
  - Pomacentrus albicaudatus, Whitefin damsel
  - Pomacentrus aquilus, Dark damsel
  - Pomacentrus leptus, Slender damsel
  - Pomacentrus pavo, Sapphire damsel
  - Pomacentrus sulfureus, Sulphur damsel
  - Pomacentrus trichourus, Paletail damsel
  - Pomacentrus trilineatus, Threeline damsel
  - Pristotis cyanostigma, Bluedotted damsel
  - Pristotis obtusirostris, Gulf damselfish
  - Stegastes lividus, Blunt snout gregory
  - Stegastes nigricans, Dusky farmerfish
  - Teixeirichthys jordani, Jordan's damsel
- Priacanthidae
  - Heteropriacanthus cruentatus, Glasseye
  - Priacanthus blochii, Paeony bulleye
  - Priacanthus hamrur, Moontail bullseye
  - Pristigenys niphonia, Japanese bigeye
- Pristidae
  - Pristis pectinata, Smalltooth sawfish
- Pseudochromidae
  - Chlidichthys johnvoelckeri, Cerise dottyback
  - Haliophis guttatus, African eel blenny
  - Pectinochromis lubbocki
  - Pseudochromis dixurus, Forktail dottyback
  - Pseudochromis flavivertex, Sunrise dottyback
  - Pseudochromis fridmani, Orchid dottyback
  - Pseudochromis olivaceus, Olive dottyback
  - Pseudochromis pesi, Pale dottyback
  - Pseudochromis sankeyi, Striped dottyback
  - Pseudochromis springeri, Blue-striped dottyback
  - Pseudochromis xanthochir
- Ptereleotridae
  - Ptereleotris evides, Blackfin dartfish
  - Ptereleotris heteroptera, Blacktail goby
  - Ptereleotris microlepis, Blue gudgeon
  - Ptereleotris zebra, Chinese zebra goby
- Rachycentridae
  - Rachycentron canadum, Cobia
- Rhinobatidae
  - Rhina ancylostoma, Bowmouth guitarfish
  - Rhynchobatus djiddensis, Giant guitarfish
- Scaridae
  - Bolbometopon muricatum, Green humphead parrotfish
  - Calotomus viridescens, Viridescent parrotfish
  - Cetoscarus bicolor, Bicolour parrotfish
  - Chlorurus genazonatus, Sinai parrotfish
  - Chlorurus gibbus, Heavybeak parrotfish
  - Chlorurus sordidus, Daisy parrotfish
  - Hipposcarus harid, Candelamoa parrotfish
  - Leptoscarus vaigiensis, Marbled parrotfish
  - Scarus caudofasciatus, Redbarred parrotfish
  - Scarus collana, Red Sea parrotfish
  - Scarus ferrugineus, Rusty parrotfish
  - Scarus frenatus, Bridled parrotfish
  - Scarus fuscopurpureus, Purple-brown parrotfish
  - Scarus ghobban, Blue-barred parrotfish
  - Scarus niger, Dusky parrotfish
  - Scarus psittacus, Common parrotfish
  - Scarus russelii, Eclipse parrotfish
  - Scarus scaber, Fivesaddle parrotfish
- Scombridae
  - Grammatorcynus bilineatus, Double-lined mackerel
  - Gymnosarda unicolor, Dogtooth tuna
- Scorpaenidae
  - Dendrochirus brachypterus, Shortfin turkeyfish
  - Dendrochirus zebra, Zebra turkeyfish
  - Parascorpaena aurita
  - Parascorpaena mossambica, Mozambique scorpionfish
  - Pterois miles, Devil firefish
  - Pterois radiata, Radial firefish
  - Pterois russelii, Plaintail turkeyfish
  - Pterois volitans, Red lionfish
  - Scorpaenodes corallinus
  - Scorpaenodes guamensis, Guam scorpionfish
  - Scorpaenodes hirsutus, Hairy scorpionfish
  - Scorpaenodes parvipinnis, Lowfin scorpionfish
  - Scorpaenodes scaber, Pygmy scorpionfish
  - Scorpaenodes varipinnis, Blotchfin scorpionfish
  - Scorpaenopsis barbata, Bearded scorpionfish
  - Scorpaenopsis diabolus, False stonefish
  - Scorpaenopsis gibbosa, Humpback scorpionfish
  - Scorpaenopsis oxycephala, Tassled scorpionfish
  - Scorpaenopsis venosa, Raggy scorpionfish
  - Scorpaenopsis vittapinna
  - Sebastapistes bynoensis, Byno scorpionfish
  - Sebastapistes cyanostigma, Yellowspotted Scorpionfish
  - Sebastapistes strongia, Barchin scorpionfish
- Serranidae
  - Aethaloperca rogaa, Redmouth grouper
  - Anyperodon leucogrammicus, Slender grouper
  - Aulacocephalus temminckii, Goldribbon soapfish
  - Cephalopholis argus, Peacock hind
  - Cephalopholis boenak, Chocolate hind
  - Cephalopholis hemistiktos, Yellowfin hind
  - Cephalopholis miniata, Coral hind
  - Cephalopholis oligosticta, Vermilion hind
  - Cephalopholis sexmaculata, Sixblotch hind
  - Diploprion drachi, Yellowfin soapfish
  - Epinephelus areolatus, Areolate grouper
  - Epinephelus chlorostigma, Brownspotted grouper
  - Epinephelus coeruleopunctatus, Whitespotted grouper
  - Epinephelus coioides, Orange-spotted grouper
  - Epinephelus fasciatus, Blacktip grouper
  - Epinephelus fuscoguttatus, Brown-marbled grouper
  - Epinephelus hexagonatus, Starspotted grouper
  - Epinephelus lanceolatus, Giant grouper
  - Epinephelus malabaricus, Malabar grouper
  - Epinephelus merra, Honeycomb grouper
  - Epinephelus morrhua, Comet grouper
  - Epinephelus polyphekadion, Camouflage grouper
  - Epinephelus stoliczkae, Epaulet grouper
  - Epinephelus summana, Summan grouper
  - Epinephelus tauvina, Greasy grouper
  - Epinephelus tukula, Potato grouper
  - Grammistes sexlineatus, Sixline soapfish
  - Liopropoma mitratum, Pinstriped basslet
  - Liopropoma susumi, Meteor perch
  - Plectranthias nanus, Bownband perchlet
  - Plectranthias winniensis, Redblotch basslet
  - Plectropomus areolatus, Squaretail coralgrouper
  - Plectropomus pessuliferus, Roving coralgrouper
  - Pseudanthias cichlops
  - Pseudanthias heemstrai, Orangehead anthias
  - Pseudanthias lunulatus, Lunate goldie
  - Pseudanthias squamipinnis, Sea goldie
  - Pseudanthias taeniatus
  - Pseudogramma megamycterum
  - Variola louti, Yellow-edged lyretail
- Siganidae
  - Siganus argenteus, Streamlined spinefoot
  - Siganus javus, Streaked spinefoot
  - Siganus luridus, Dusky spinefoot
  - Siganus rivulatus, Marbled spinefoot
  - Siganus stellatus, Brownspotted spinefoot
- Sillaginidae
  - Sillago sihama, Silver sillago
- Soleidae
  - Aesopia cornuta, Unicorn sole
  - Pardachirus marmoratus, Finless sole
  - Soleichthys heterorhinos
- Solenostomidae
  - Solenostomus cyanopterus, Ghost pipefish
  - Solenostomus paradoxus, Harlequin ghost pipefish
- Sparidae
  - Acanthopagrus bifasciatus, Twobar seabream
  - Argyrops filamentosus, Soldierbream
  - Cheimerius nufar, Santer seabream
  - Diplodus noct, Red Sea seabream
  - Polysteganus coeruleopunctatus, Blueskin seabream
  - Rhabdosargus haffara, Haffara seabream
  - Rhabdosargus sarba, Goldlined seabream
- Sphyraenidae
  - Sphyraena barracuda, Great barracuda
  - Sphyraena flavicauda, Yellowtail barracuda
  - Sphyraena forsteri, Bigeye barracuda
  - Sphyraena jello, Pickhandle barracuda
  - Sphyraena obtusata, Obtuse barracuda
  - Sphyraena putnamae, Sawtooth barracuda
  - Sphyraena qenie, Blackfin barracuda
- Sphyrnidae
  - Sphyrna lewini, Scalloped hammerhead
  - Sphyrna mokarran, Great hammerhead
- Stegostomatidae
  - Stegostoma fasciatum, Zebra shark
- Synanceiidae
  - Inimicus filamentosus, Two-stick stingfish
  - Synanceia verrucosa, Stonefish
- Syngnathidae
  - Acentronura tentaculata
  - Choeroichthys brachysoma, Short-bodied pipefish
  - Corythoichthys flavofasciatus, Network pipefish
  - Corythoichthys nigripectus, Black-breasted pipefish
  - Corythoichthys schultzi, Schultz's pipefish
  - Cosmocampus banneri, Roughridge pipefish
  - Cosmocampus maxweberi, Maxweber's pipefish
  - Doryrhamphus dactyliophorus, Ringed pipefish
  - Doryrhamphus excisus abbreviatus
  - Doryrhamphus multiannulatus, Many-banded pipefish
  - Halicampus dunckeri, Duncker's pipefish
  - Halicampus grayi, Gray's pipefish
  - Halicampus macrorhynchus, Ornate pipefish
  - Halicampus mataafae, Samoan pipefish
  - Hippocampus histrix, Thorny seahorse
  - Hippocampus kuda, Spotted seahorse
  - Micrognathus andersonii, Shortnose pipefish
  - Phoxocampus belcheri, Rock pipefish
  - Siokunichthys bentuviai
  - Syngnathoides biaculeatus, Alligator pipefish
  - Trachyrhamphus bicoarctatus, Double-ended pipefish
- Synodontidae
  - Saurida gracilis, Gracile lizardfish
  - Saurida tumbil, Greater lizardfish
  - Saurida undosquamis, Brushtooth lizardfish
  - Synodus indicus, Indian lizardfish
  - Synodus variegatus, Variegated lizardfish
  - Trachinocephalus myops, Snakefish
- Terapontidae
  - Pelates quadrilineatus, Fourlined terapon
  - Terapon theraps, Largescaled therapon
- Tetraodontidae
  - Arothron diadematus, Masked puffer
  - Arothron hispidus, White-spotted puffer
  - Arothron immaculatus, Immaculate puffer
  - Arothron stellatus, Starry toadfish
  - Canthigaster cyanospilota, Blue-spotted toby
  - Canthigaster margaritata, Pearl toby
  - Canthigaster pygmaea, Pygmy toby
  - Lagocephalus sceleratus, Silver-cheeked toadfish
  - Torquigener flavimaculosus
- Torpedinidae
  - Torpedo sinuspersici, Marbled electric ray
- Tripterygiidae
  - Enneapterygius abeli, Yellow triplefin
  - Enneapterygius altipinnis, Highfin triplefin
  - Enneapterygius tutuilae, High-hat Triplefin
  - Helcogramma steinitzi, Red triplefin
  - Norfolkia brachylepis, Redfin Triplefin
- Uranoscopidae
  - Uranoscopus sulphureus, Whitemargin stargazer
- Xenisthmidae
  - Xenisthmus polyzonatus, Bullseye wriggler

== See also ==
- List of red sea sharks
- Fish of the Red Sea
- List of deep water fish of the Red Sea
