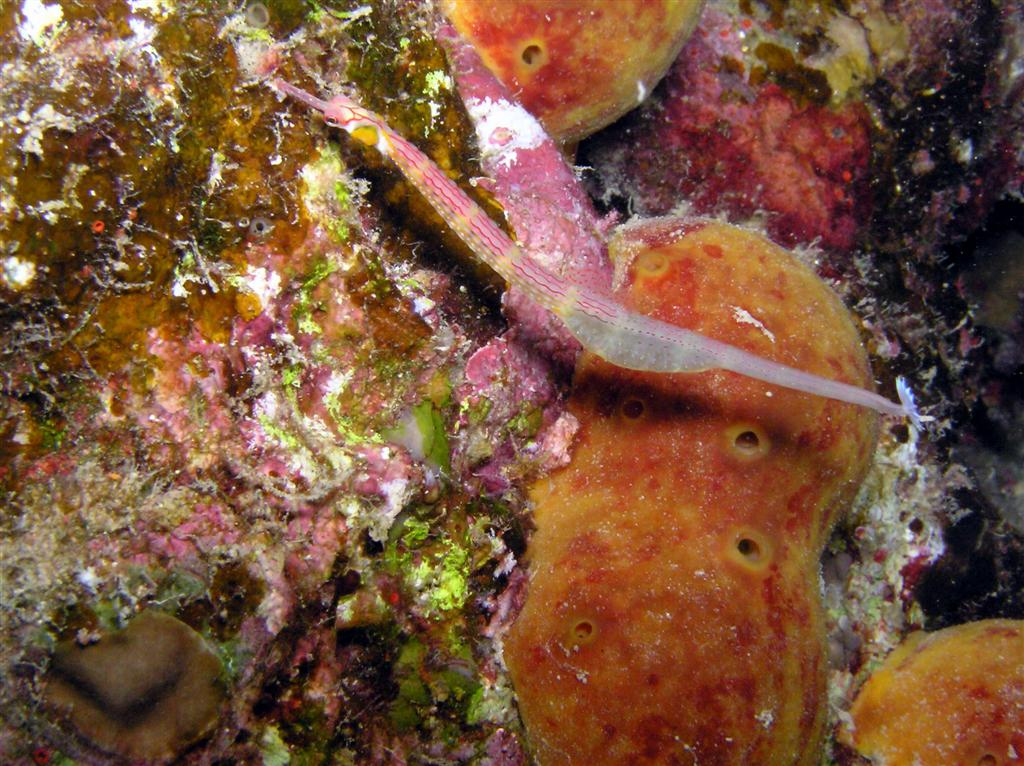
- Male carrying eggs

Conservation status
- Least Concern (IUCN 3.1)

Scientific classification
- Kingdom: Animalia
- Phylum: Chordata
- Class: Actinopterygii
- Order: Syngnathiformes
- Family: Syngnathidae
- Genus: Corythoichthys
- Species: C. nigripectus

Binomial name
- Corythoichthys nigripectus Herald, 1953

= Corythoichthys nigripectus =

Species of fish

Corythoichthys nigripectus (black-breasted pipefish) is a species of marine fish of the family Syngnathidae. It is found in the Indo-Pacific, from the Red Sea, Indonesia and the Philippines to the Society Islands, Guam and New Caledonia. It inhabits coral reefs and algae patches at depths of 5–30 metres (16–98 ft), where it can grow to lengths of 11 centimetres (4.3 in). This species is both monogamous and ovoviviparous, with males carrying eggs and giving birth to live young.
