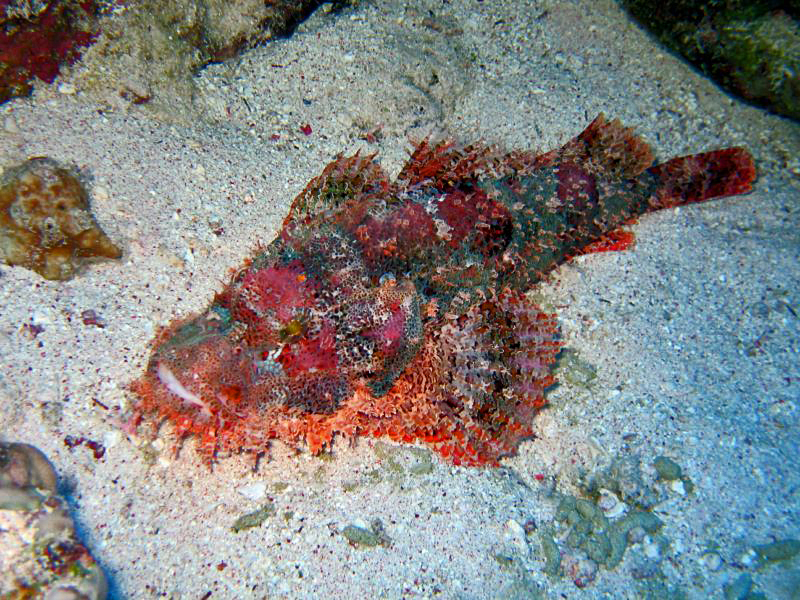
- Scorpaenopsis barbata from Sharm El Sheik

Conservation status
- Least Concern (IUCN 3.1)

Scientific classification
- Kingdom: Animalia
- Phylum: Chordata
- Class: Actinopterygii
- Division: Teleostei
- Order: Perciformes
- Family: Scorpaenidae
- Genus: Scorpaenopsis
- Species: S. barbata

Binomial name
- Scorpaenopsis barbata (Ruppell, 1838)

Synonyms
- Scorpaena barbata Rüppell, 1838

= Scorpaenopsis barbata =

Species of fish

Scorpaenopsis barbata, the bearded scorpionfish, is a species of venomous marine ray-finned fish belonging to the family Scorpaenidae, the scorpionfishes. This species is found in the Indian and Pacific Oceans.

== Taxonomy ==
Scorpaenopsis barbata was first formally described as Scorpaena barbata in 1838 by the German naturalist and explorer Eduard Rüppell with the type locality given as Massawa in Eritrea. The specific name barbata means "bearded", an allusion to the fleshy tentacles on either side of the lower jaw.

== Description ==
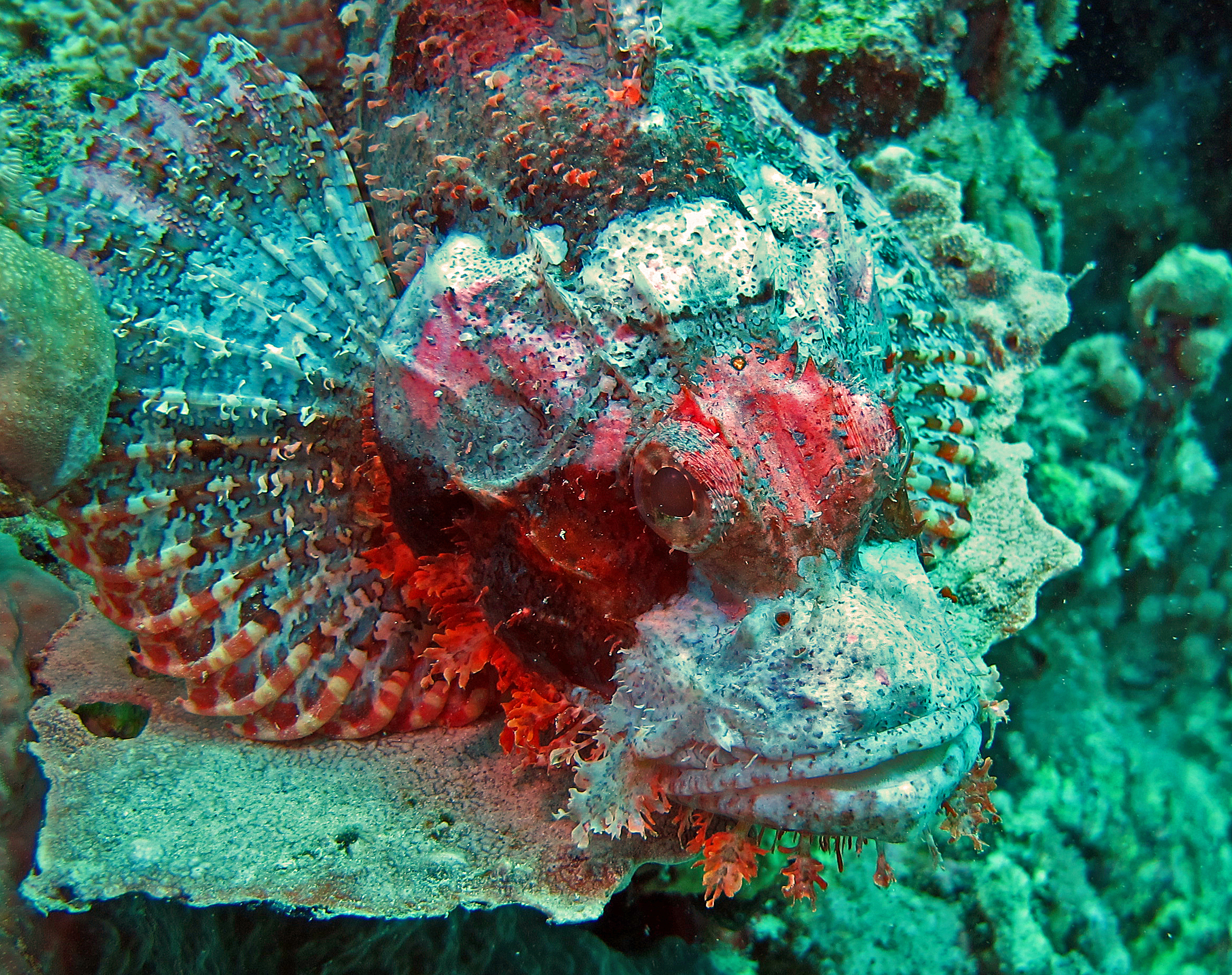
Scorpaenopsis barbata from Sudan coast. Close-up

Scorpaenopsis barbata can reach a length of 22 centimetres (8.7 in). They are brightly colored and heavily camouflaged. They have a broad spiny head with a large mouth and feathery fins. Their body is reddish brown or dark brown, with whitish and blackish blotches. Many fleshy outgrowths of skin protrude from their chin (hence the common name of bearded scorpionfish). These fishes have twelve dorsal spines, nine dorsal soft rays, three anal spines and five anal soft rays. Fin spines may bear venom glands at the base.

== Distribution and habitat ==
Scorpaenopsis barbata can be found in the Western Indian Ocean, from the it occurs in the Red Sea, the Persian Gulf, the Gulf of Aden and along the southern coast of the Arabian Peninsula. It may have a wider distribution but identification difficulties may lead to its presence being missed. These tropical reef-associated fishes live in rocky coastlines, in rubble and on sand around coral patches at depth up to 30 m.

== Biology ==
Scorpaenopsis barbata is an ambush predator which sits camouflaged among algae and seaweed on the seabed and feeds mainly on crustaceans and other small fishes which come into its range. When the prey swims within range, it is snapped up by the powerful jaws of the bearded scorpionfish. This is an oviparous species, the eggs hatch in around 2 days after laying into very small larvae. These stay near the surface until they attain a length of 5 cm (2.0 in) when they settle onto the seabed.

== Bibliography ==
- Carpenter, K.E., F. Krupp, D.A. Jones i U. Zajonz, 1997. FAO species identification field guide for fishery purposes. Living marine resources of Kuwait, eastern Saudi Arabia, Bahrain, Qatar, and the United Arab Emirates. FAO, Roma, Itàlia. 293 p
- Eschmeyer, William N., ed. 1998. Catalog of Fishes. Special Publication of the Center for Biodiversity Research and Information, núm. 1, vol. 1–3. California Academy of Sciences. San Francisco, USA. ISBN 0-940228-47-5.
- Krupp, F., M. Almarri, U. Zajonz, K. Carpenter, S. Almatar i H. Zetzsche, 2000. Twelve new records of fishes from the Gulf. Fauna of Arabia 18:323-335.
- Randall, J.E i W.N. Eschmeyer, 2001. Revision of the Indo-Pacific scorpionfish genus Scopaenopsis, with descriptions of eight new species. Indo-Pacific Fishes (34):79 p.
- Randall, J.E., 1995. Coastal fishes of Oman. University of Hawaii Press, Honolulu, Hawaii. 439 p.
- Randall, J.E., G.R. Allen i W.F. Smith-Vaniz, 1978. Illustrated identification guide to commercial fishes. Regional Fishery Survey and Development Project. Bahrain, Iran, Iraq, Kuwait, Oman, Qatar, Saudi Arabia, United Arab Emirates. UNDP/FAO F1:DP/RAB/71/278/3. 221 p. FAO, Roma.
- Sommer, C., W. Schneider i J.-M. Poutiers, 1996. FAO species identification field guide for fishery purposes. The living marine resources of Somalia. FAO, Roma. 376 p.
