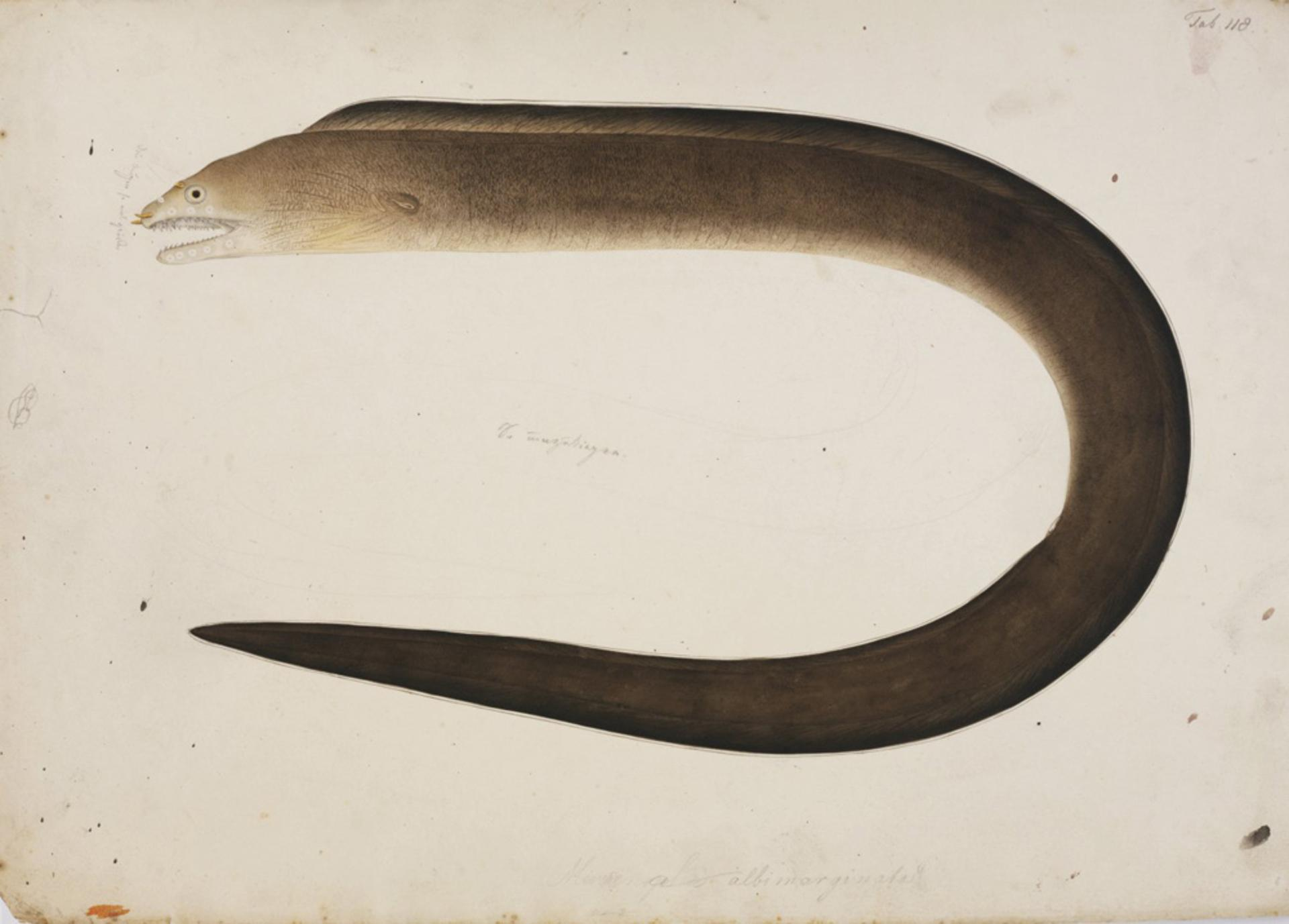

Conservation status
- Least Concern (IUCN 3.1)

Scientific classification
- Kingdom: Animalia
- Phylum: Chordata
- Class: Actinopterygii
- Order: Anguilliformes
- Family: Muraenidae
- Genus: Gymnothorax
- Species: G. hepaticus

Binomial name
- Gymnothorax hepaticus (Rüppell, 1830)

= Liver-colored moray =

Species of fish

The liver-colored moray (Gymnothorax hepaticus) is a moray eel found in coral reefs in the Pacific and Indian Oceans. It was first named by Eduard Rüppell in 1830.
