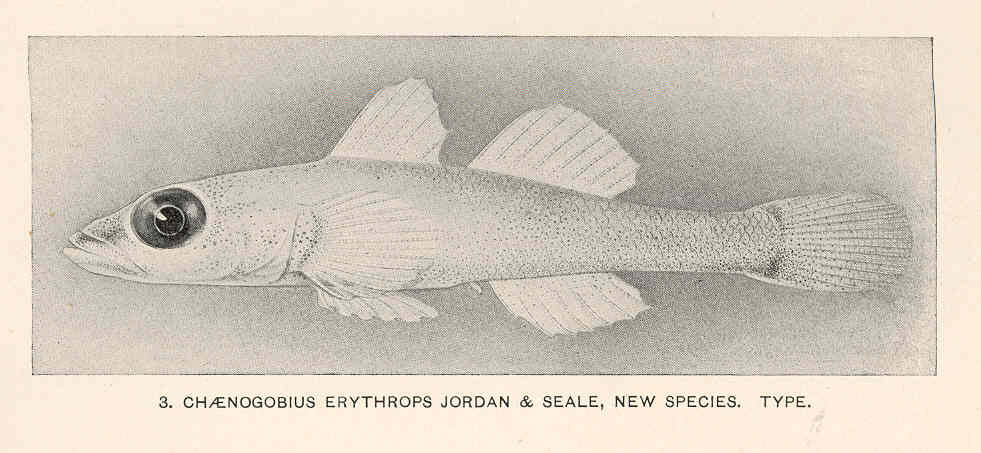

Conservation status
- Least Concern (IUCN 3.1)

Scientific classification
- Kingdom: Animalia
- Phylum: Chordata
- Class: Actinopterygii
- Order: Gobiiformes
- Family: Gobiidae
- Genus: Bryaninops
- Species: B. erythrops

Binomial name
- Bryaninops erythrops (D. S. Jordan & Seale, 1906)

Synonyms
- Chaenogobius erythrops Jordan & Seale, 1906; Tenacigobius erythrops (Jordan & Seale, 1906)

= Bryaninops erythrops =

Species of fish

Bryaninops erythrops, known commonly as the translucent coral goby or Erythrops goby , is a species of marine fish in the family Gobiidae.

The translucent coral goby is widespread throughout the tropical waters of the Indo-Pacific area, including the Red Sea.

This fish is a small size that can reach a maximum size of 2.3 cm length.
