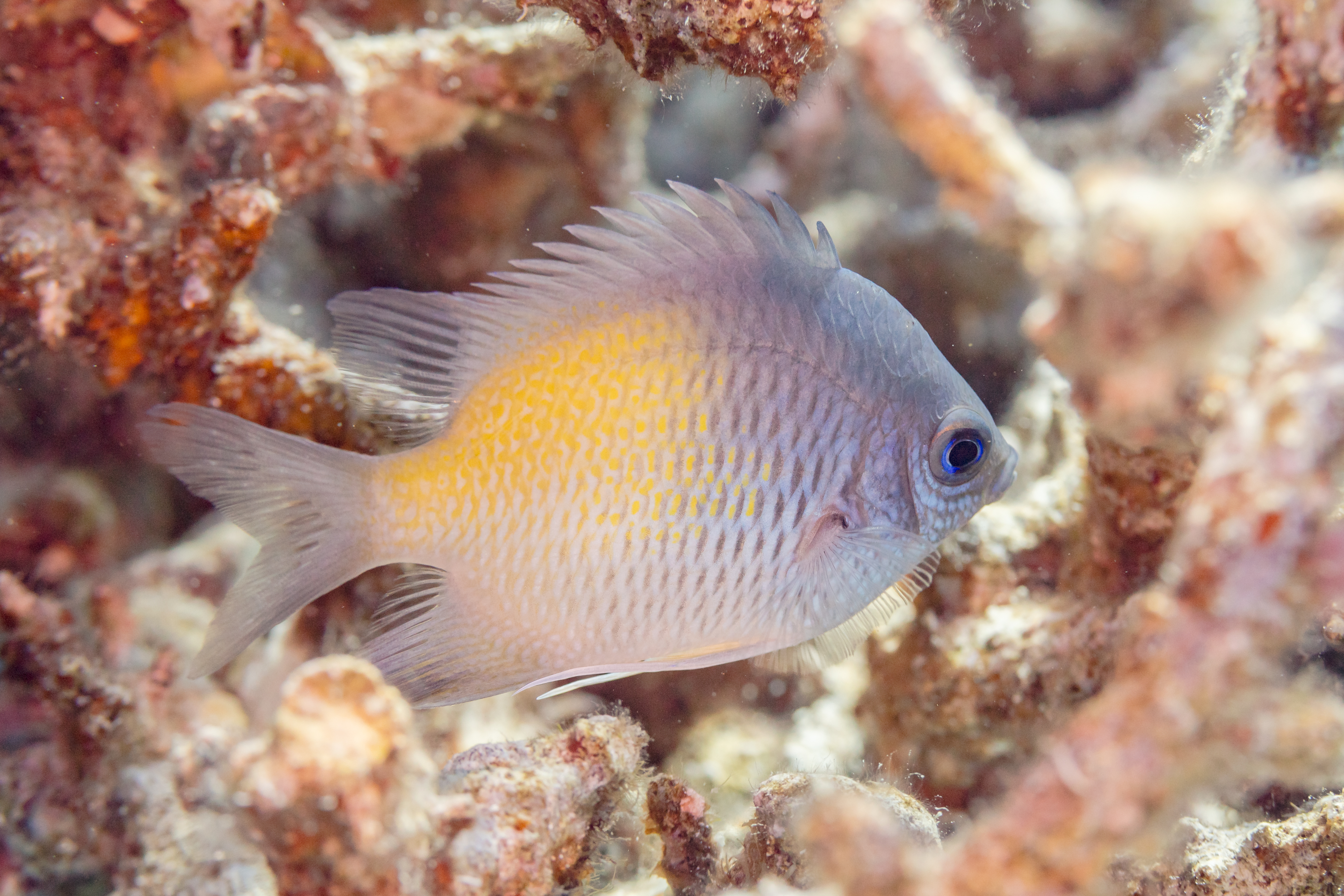

Conservation status
- Least Concern (IUCN 3.1)

Scientific classification
- Kingdom: Animalia
- Phylum: Chordata
- Class: Actinopterygii
- Order: Blenniiformes
- Family: Pomacentridae
- Genus: Amblyglyphidodon
- Species: A. flavilatus

Binomial name
- Amblyglyphidodon flavilatus Allen & Randall, 1980

= Amblyglyphidodon flavilatus =

Species of fish

Amblyglyphidodon flavilatus, known as yellow damselfish, yellowfin damselfish, yellow flank damselfish, yellow side damselfish, and yellow-sided Damselfish, is part Pomacentridae, which is a family of ray-finned fish including damselfish and clownfish. This family represents the greatest diversity and abundance of fish species inhabiting coral reefs. They were first described in 1980 by Allen and Randall.

== Habitat ==
Amblyglyphidodon flavilatus is a reef dwelling fish, most often found at coastal fringing reefs and reef slopes. It is only found between the depths of 12 to 20 m (39 to 66 ft). Amblyglyphidodon flavilatus has not been known to migrate from their spots, so they are non-migratory fish. They prefer warmer water, between temperatures from 72–78 °F (22–26 °C). This species is native to the western Indian Ocean, from the Red Sea and the Gulf of Aden, specifically in Djibouti, Egypt, Eritrea, Israel, Jordan, Saudi Arabia, Somalia, Sudan, and Yemen.

== Description ==
Amblyglyphidodon flavilatus has a total of thirteen dorsal spines, these would be spines on the top or back of the fish. It also has eleven to thirteen dorsal soft rays, which are segmented fin rays that are composed of two closely joined lateral elements. The dorsal soft rays are almost always flexible and often branched. Amblyglyphidodon flavilatus has two anal spines, and eleven to thirteen anal soft rays. The overall color is pearly white with the anterior half being grayish, the chest is predominately pearly white, and the posterior half of body is a yellowish color. (hence the Latin species name flavilatus, meaning with yellow sides).

Many pomacentrid species are intensely territorial and compete for space both within and among species. The territory they defend are called "algal gardens" which are large patches of algae that they cultivate and take care of. The reproductive patterns of some damselfish are related to periodic rainfall and wind changes in tropical areas. some authors suggest that the synchrony of the reproductive activities of damselfishes is influenced by the lunar cycle.

== Biology ==
Amblyglyphidodon flavilatus are oviparous, which means that they reproduce by means of eggs that are hatched after they have been laid by the parent. There is very little embryonic development involved in oviparous eggs. Amblyglyphidodon flavilatus shows distinct pairing during breeding. Eggs are demersal (living close to the floor of the sea or a lake) and adhere to the substrate. Male damselfish guard and aerate the eggs. These fishes mainly feed on zooplankton. Amblyglyphidodon flavilatus are currently registered as "least concern" and have a stable population.
