= Uropterygius concolor =

Conservation status
- Least Concern (IUCN 3.1)

Scientific classification
- Kingdom: Animalia
- Phylum: Chordata
- Class: Actinopterygii
- Order: Anguilliformes
- Family: Muraenidae
- Genus: Uropterygius
- Species: U. concolor

Binomial name
- Uropterygius concolor Rüppell, 1838

Species of fish

Uropterygius concolor is a moray eel found in coral reefs in the Red Sea (Records from outside represent related but distinct species). It was first named by Rüppell in 1838, and is commonly known as the unicolor snake moray, uniform reef-eel, brown reef-eel, brown moray eel, or the brown moray. It is mostly dull brown in colour, with the tip of the tail being yellow.
