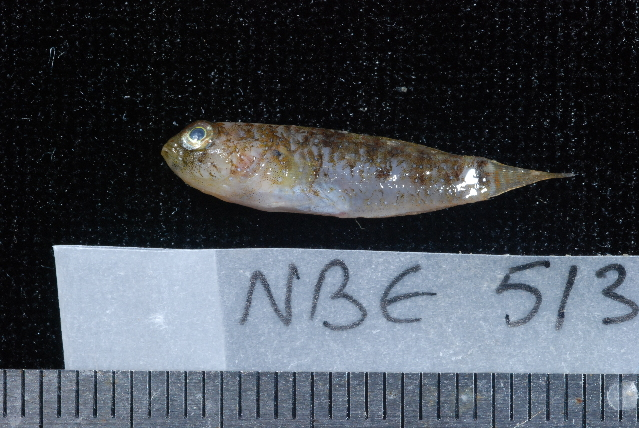

Conservation status
- Least Concern (IUCN 3.1)

Scientific classification
- Kingdom: Animalia
- Phylum: Chordata
- Class: Actinopterygii
- Order: Gobiiformes
- Family: Gobiidae
- Genus: Asterropteryx
- Species: A. ensifera

Binomial name
- Asterropteryx ensifera (Bleeker, 1874)

Synonyms
- Brachyeleotris ensifera Bleeker, 1874; Asterropterix ensiferus (Bleeker, 1874); Asterropteryx ensiferus (Bleeker, 1874)

= Asterropteryx ensifera =

Species of fish

Asterropteryx ensifera, known commonly as the Miller's damsel , is a species of marine fish in the family Gobiidae.

It is widespread throughout the tropical waters of the Indo-Pacific area; the Red Sea included.

This is a small size fish that can reach a maximum size of 3 cm length.
