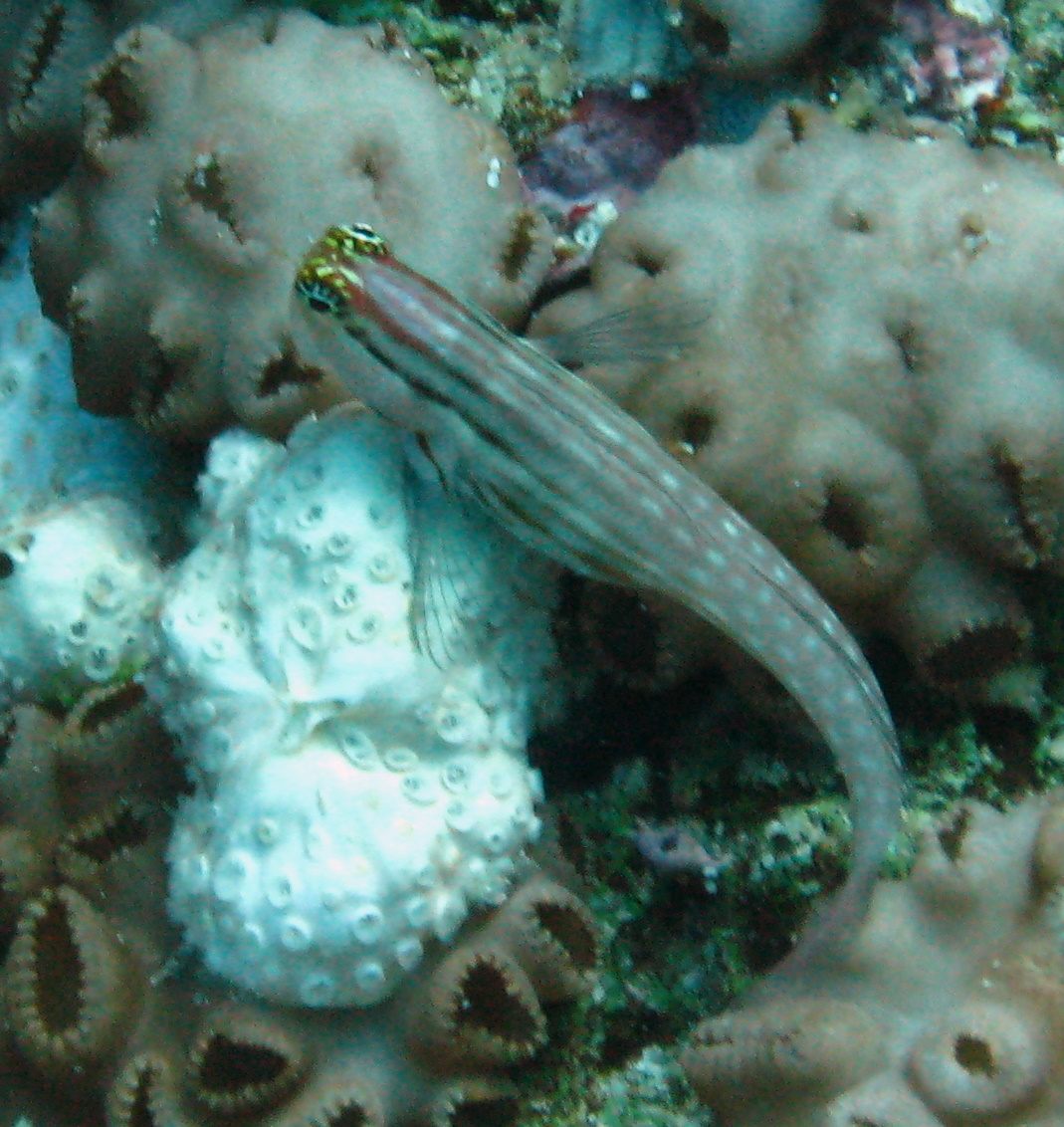

Conservation status
- Least Concern (IUCN 3.1)

Scientific classification
- Kingdom: Animalia
- Phylum: Chordata
- Class: Actinopterygii
- Division: Teleostei
- Order: Blenniiformes
- Family: Blenniidae
- Genus: Ecsenius
- Species: E. nalolo

Binomial name
- Ecsenius nalolo J. L. B. Smith, 1959

= Ecsenius nalolo =

Species of fish

Ecsenius nalolo, known commonly as the Nalolo in South Africa or the Nalolo blenny in Micronesia, is a species of combtooth blenny in the genus Ecsenius. It is found in coral reefs in the western Indian Ocean. It can reach a maximum length of 6.5 centimetres. Blennies in this species feed primarily on plants, including benthic algae and weeds.
