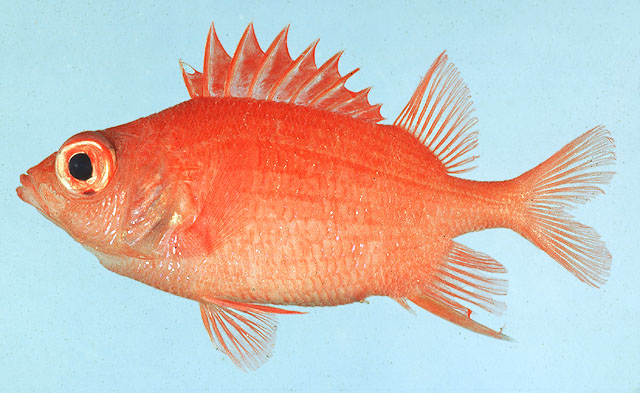

Scientific classification
- Domain: Eukaryota
- Kingdom: Animalia
- Phylum: Chordata
- Class: Actinopterygii
- Order: Beryciformes
- Family: Holocentridae
- Genus: Sargocentron
- Species: S. macrosquamis

Binomial name
- Sargocentron macrosquamis (Golani, 1984)

= Sargocentron macrosquamis =

Species of Fish

Sargocentron macrosquamis, the big-scale squirrelfish, is a species of squirrelfish belonging to the genus of Sargocentron. It can be found in the Western Indian Ocean, from the Red Sea to Mozambique, and in Seychelles, Maldives and the Chagos Islands.
