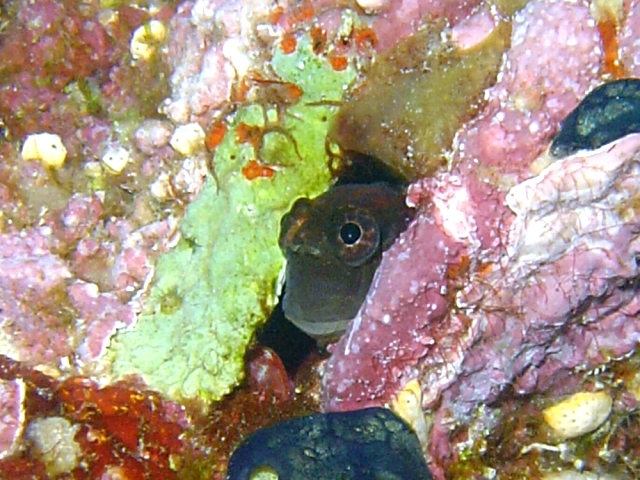

Conservation status
- Least Concern (IUCN 3.1)

Scientific classification
- Kingdom: Animalia
- Phylum: Chordata
- Class: Actinopterygii
- Division: Teleostei
- Order: Blenniiformes
- Family: Blenniidae
- Genus: Ecsenius
- Species: E. aroni

Binomial name
- Ecsenius aroni V. G. Springer, 1971

= Ecsenius aroni =

Species of fish

Ecsenius aroni, known commonly as the Aron's blenny, is a species of combtooth blenny found in coral reefs in the western Indian Ocean, from the Red Sea and the Gulf of Aqaba south to Djetta in Saudi Arabia and Towartit Reef near Port Sudan. The specific name honours the oceanographer William Aron of the Smithsonian Institution.
