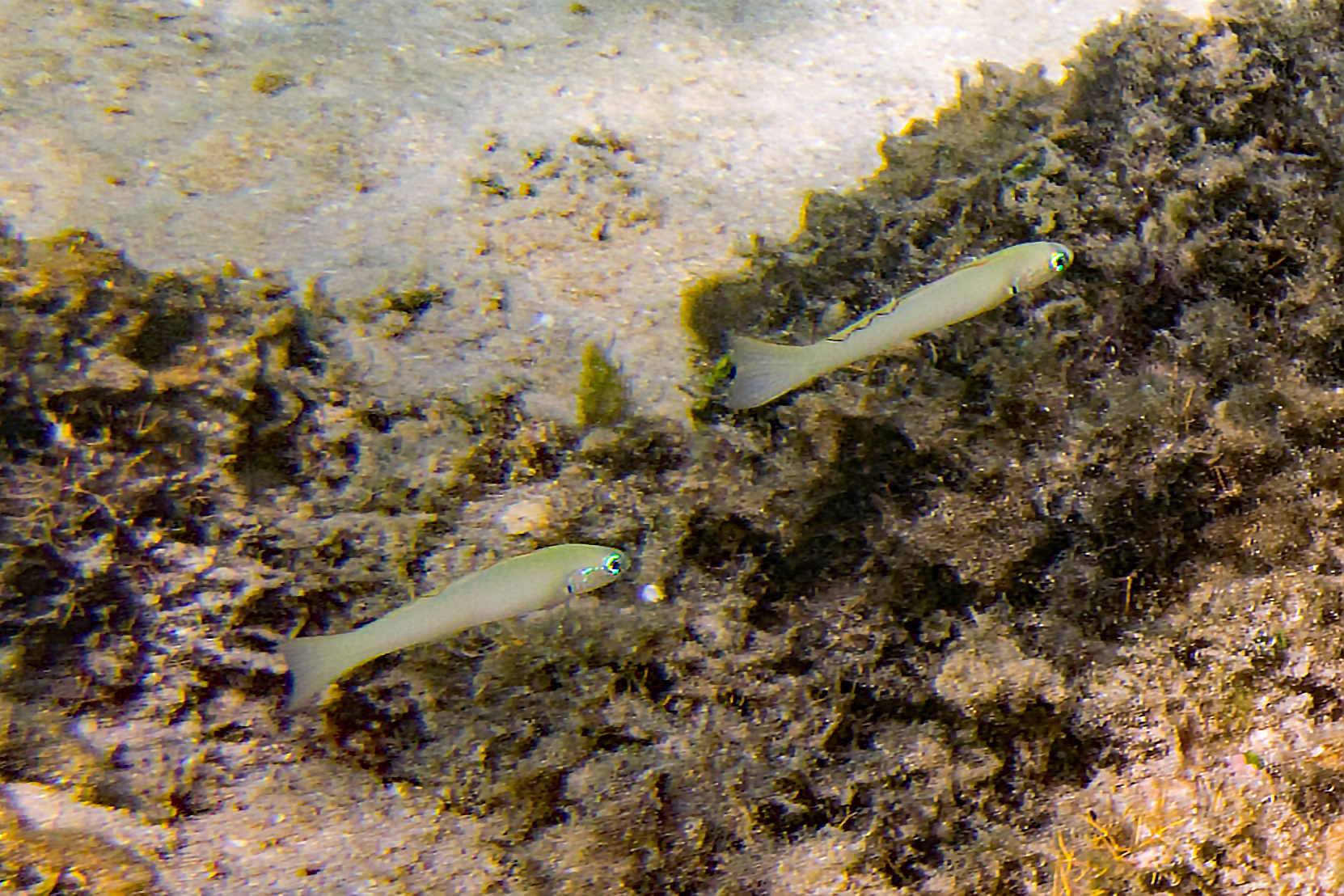

Conservation status
- Least Concern (IUCN 3.1)

Scientific classification
- Kingdom: Animalia
- Phylum: Chordata
- Class: Actinopterygii
- Order: Gobiiformes
- Family: Gobiidae
- Genus: Ptereleotris
- Species: P. microlepis

Binomial name
- Ptereleotris microlepis (Bleeker, 1856)

= Ptereleotris microlepis =

Species of fish

Ptereleotris microlepis is a species of the fish is that lives in the Indian and Pacific Oceans.

== Occurrence ==
It is widely distributed in a variety of nearshore habitats of the Indian and Pacific Oceans.

The species can be found near Taiwan, Hong Kong, Philippines, Ryukyu islands, Malaysia, and Indonesia. It has also been found near Tuamoto islands, southern parts Great Barrier Reef, Red Sea, and the Indian Ocean.

It occurs in shallow lagoons and harbors. It also inhabits sandy fringes of coral reefs.

== Name ==
The original name for the species was Eleotris microlepis.

In English the species goes by common names like blue gudgeon, green-eye dart-goby, smallscale hovergoby, or pPale dartfish.
