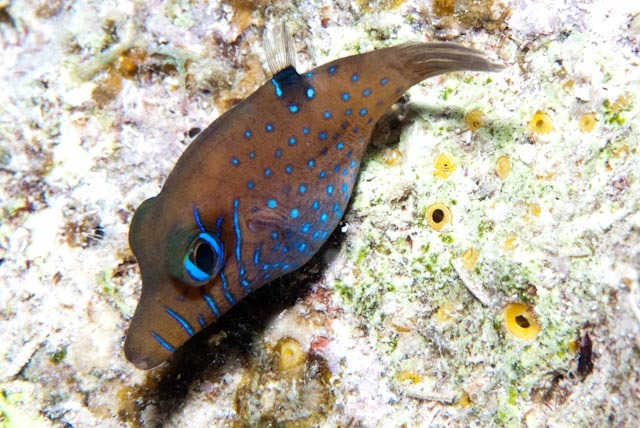

Conservation status
- Least Concern (IUCN 3.1)

Scientific classification
- Kingdom: Animalia
- Phylum: Chordata
- Class: Actinopterygii
- Order: Tetraodontiformes
- Family: Tetraodontidae
- Genus: Canthigaster
- Species: C. pygmaea

Binomial name
- Canthigaster pygmaea Allen & Randall, 1977

= Canthigaster pygmaea =

Species of fish

Canthigaster pygmaea, commonly known as the pygmy toby, is a species of pufferfish in the family Tetraodontidae. It is known only from the Red Sea, where it occurs at a depth range of 2 to 30 m (7 to 98 ft). It inhabits coral reefs and is very secretive, often being found hidden in small holes. It is a small oviparous fish, reaching 5.6 cm (2.2 inches) in total length.
