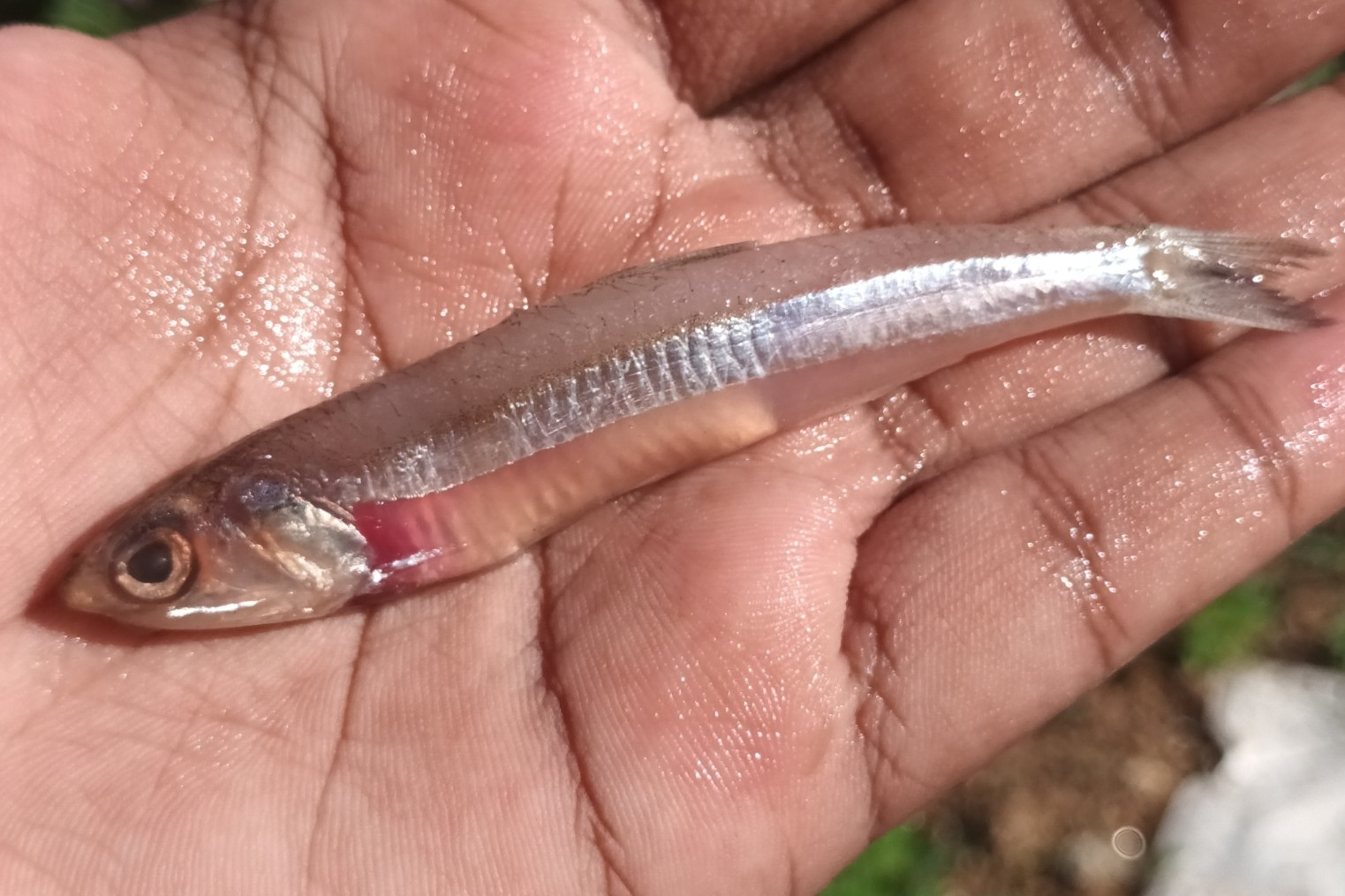

Conservation status
- Least Concern (IUCN 3.1)

Scientific classification
- Kingdom: Animalia
- Phylum: Chordata
- Class: Actinopterygii
- Order: Clupeiformes
- Family: Engraulidae
- Genus: Encrasicholina
- Species: E. heteroloba

Binomial name
- Encrasicholina heteroloba (Rüppell, 1837)

Synonyms
- Engraulis heteroloba Rüppell, 1837; Anchoviella heteroloba (Rüppell, 1837); Encrasicholina heterolobus (Rüppell, 1837); Encrasicholus heteroloba (Rüppell, 1837); Stolephorus heterolobus (Rüppell, 1837); Encrasicolina heteroloba (Rüppell, 1837); Encrasicolus heteroloba (Rüppell, 1837); Stolephorus heteroloba (Rüppell, 1837); Encrasicholina devisi (Whitley, 1940); Amentum devisi Whitley, 1940; Stolephorus devisi (Whitley, 1940)

= Encrasicholina heteroloba =

Shorthead anchovy

Species of fish

Encrasicholina heteroloba, the shorthead anchovy, is a species of ray-finned fish in the family Engraulidae. It is found in the western Indian Ocean.

== Size ==
This species reaches a length of 12.0 cm (4.7 in).
