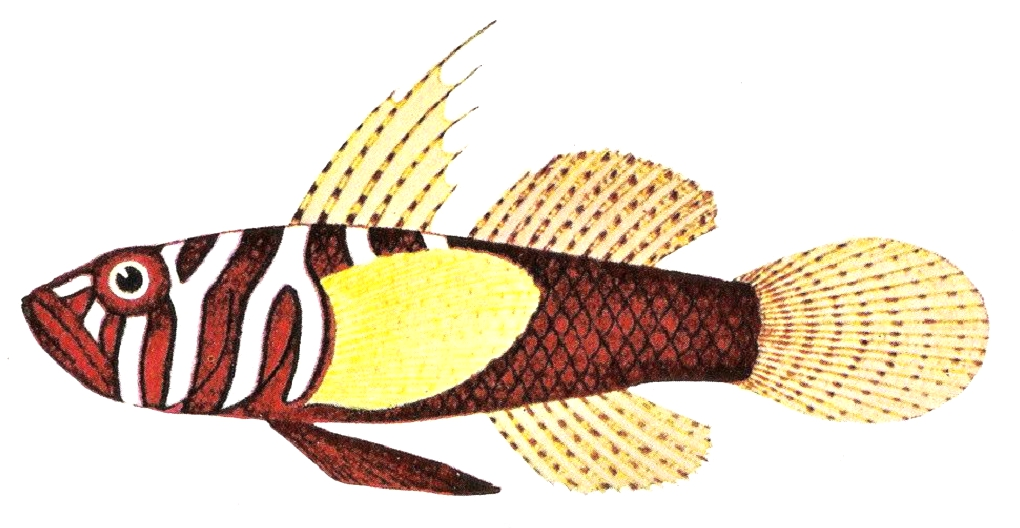

Conservation status
- Least Concern (IUCN 3.1)

Scientific classification
- Kingdom: Animalia
- Phylum: Chordata
- Class: Actinopterygii
- Division: Teleostei
- Order: Gobiiformes
- Family: Gobiidae
- Genus: Priolepis
- Species: P. semidoliata

Binomial name
- Priolepis semidoliata (Valenciennes, 1837)

Synonyms
- Gobius semidoliatus Valenciennes, 1837; Zonogobius semidoliatus (Valenciennes, 1837); Gobius semifasciatus Kner, 1868

= Priolepis semidoliata =

Half-barred goby

Species of fish

Priolepis semidoliata, the half-barred goby, is a species of goby native to the Indo-Pacific region.

== Description ==
Priolepis semidoliata grows to a length of 2.4 cm (0.94 in). It can be identified by light-colored transverse bars on the front half of the body, from the snout to the base of the pectoral fins. The bars are relatively wide, equal to or wider than the width of the pupils of the eyes. Its scales are restricted to the belly, with virtually no scales on the head and gill covers.

Priolepis semidoliata closely resembles Priolepis farcimen, a species occurring in Hawaii.

== Taxonomy ==
Priolepis semidoliata belongs to the genus Priolepis of the goby family, Gobiidae. It was first described by the French zoologist Achille Valenciennes in 1837. He originally named it Gobius semidoliatus.

== Distribution and habitat ==
Priolepis semidoliata are native to the Indian Ocean and western Pacific Ocean, occurring in the area between the Red Sea to Pitcairn and Japan to Australia. They are a benthic species, inhabiting marine caves and crevices in coral reefs.
