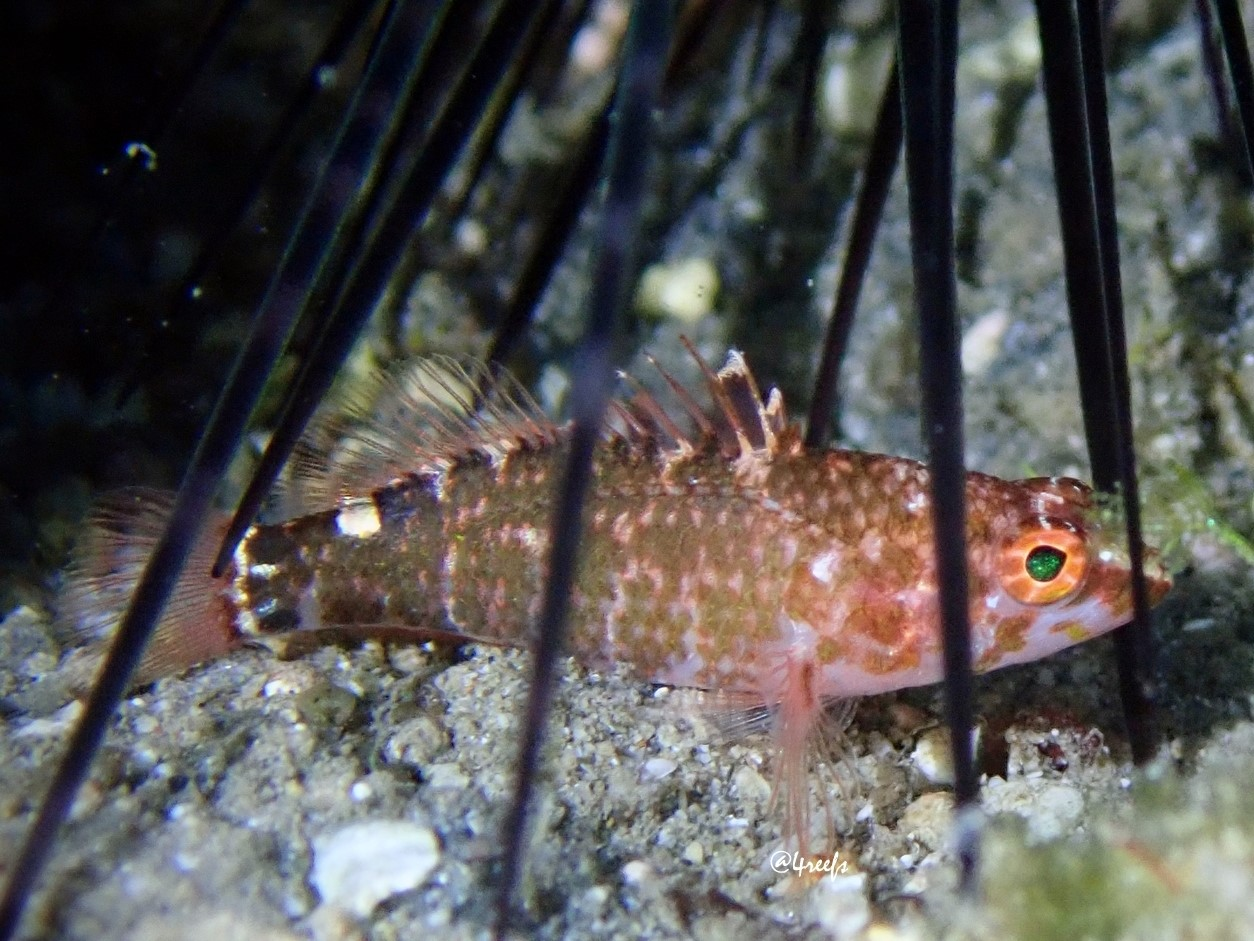

Conservation status
- Least Concern (IUCN 3.1)

Scientific classification
- Kingdom: Animalia
- Phylum: Chordata
- Class: Actinopterygii
- Order: Perciformes
- Family: Anthiadidae
- Genus: Plectranthias
- Species: P. nanus

Binomial name
- Plectranthias nanus J. E. Randall, 1980

= Plectranthias nanus =

Species of fish

Plectranthias nanus, also known as brownband perchlet and dwarf perchlet, is a species of fish in the family Serranidae occurring in the Pacific Ocean.

== Size ==
This species reaches a length of 4.0 cm (1.6 in).
