= Gymnothorax pindae =

Conservation status
- Least Concern (IUCN 3.1)

Scientific classification
- Kingdom: Animalia
- Phylum: Chordata
- Class: Actinopterygii
- Division: Teleostei
- Order: Anguilliformes
- Family: Muraenidae
- Genus: Gymnothorax
- Species: G. pindae

Binomial name
- Gymnothorax pindae (J. L. B. Smith, 1962)

Species of eel

Gymnothorax pindae is a moray eel found in coral reefs in the Pacific and Indian Oceans. It was first named by Smith in 1962, and is commonly known as the Pinda moray.
