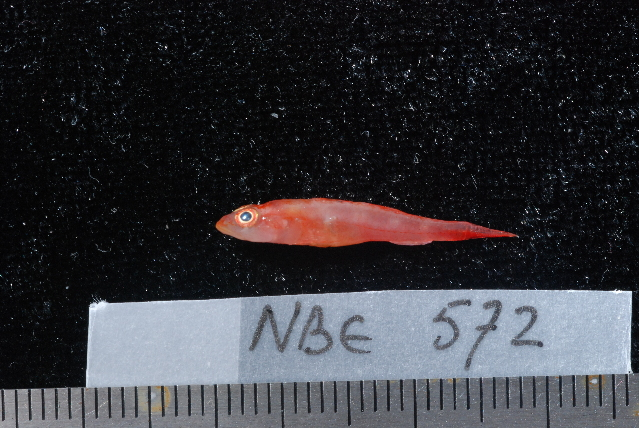

Scientific classification
- Kingdom: Animalia
- Phylum: Chordata
- Class: Actinopterygii
- Order: Syngnathiformes
- Family: Callionymidae
- Genus: Callionymus
- Species: C. delicatulus

Binomial name
- Callionymus delicatulus J. L. B. Smith, 1963

= Delicate dragonet =

Species of fish

The delicate dragonet (Callionymus delicatulus) is a species of dragonet native to the Red Sea through the Indian Ocean to the western Pacific Ocean. It occurs at depths of from 1 to 20 metres (3.3 to 65.6 ft). This species grows to a length of 6 centimetres (2.4 in) TL.
