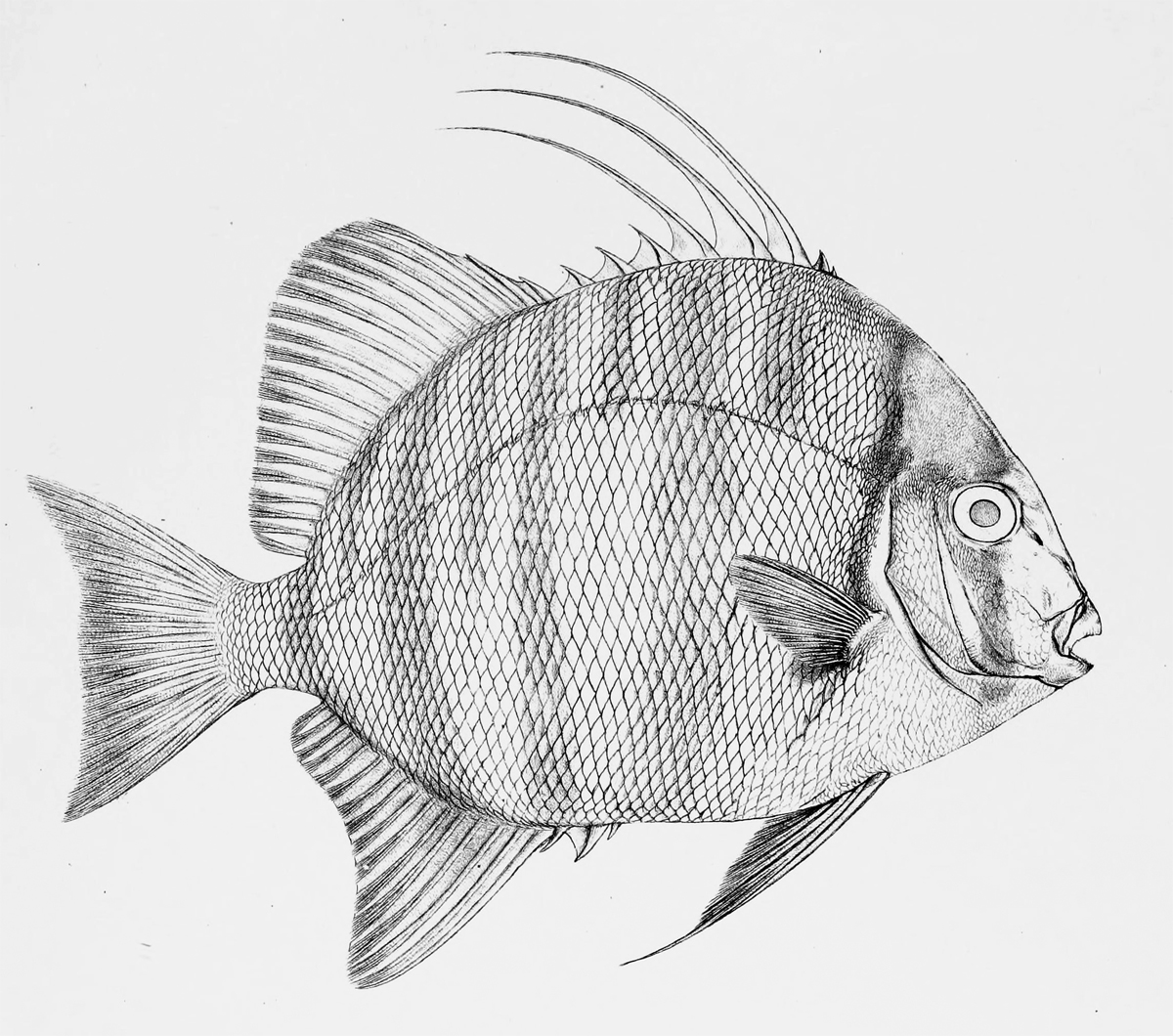

Scientific classification
- Kingdom: Animalia
- Phylum: Chordata
- Class: Actinopterygii
- Order: Acanthuriformes
- Family: Ephippidae
- Genus: Tripterodon; Playfair, 1867
- Species: T. orbis

Binomial name
- Tripterodon orbis Playfair, 1867

= African spadefish =

Species of fish

The African spadefish (Tripterodon orbis) is a species of marine ray-finned fish belonging to the family Ephippidae. This species is found on the reefs along the Indian Ocean coast of Africa east to India and Sri Lanka as far as the Andaman and Nicobar Islands. This species grows to a length of 75 centimetres (30 in) TL. This species is important to local commercial fisheries and is also popular as a game fish. This species is the only known member of genus Tripterodon.
