= Chlidichthys johnvoelckeri =

Scientific classification
- Kingdom: Animalia
- Phylum: Chordata
- Class: Actinopterygii
- Order: Blenniiformes
- Family: Pseudochromidae
- Genus: Chlidichthys
- Species: C. johnvoelckeri

Binomial name
- Chlidichthys johnvoelckeri J. L. B. Smith, 1954

Species of fish

Chlidichthys johnvoelckeri, the cerise dottyback, is a species of fish in the family Pseudochromidae.

== Description ==
Chlidichthys johnvoelckeri is a small-sized fish which grows up to 6.0 cm (2.4 in).

== Distribution and habitat ==
Chlidichthys johnvoelckeri is found in the Western part of the Indian Ocean, from Tanzania and Mozambique to the Comoros.

== Etymology ==
In 1954 the fish was named by Smith in honor of John Voelcker (1898-1968), a prominent amateur ornithologist in Johannesburg, South Africa.
