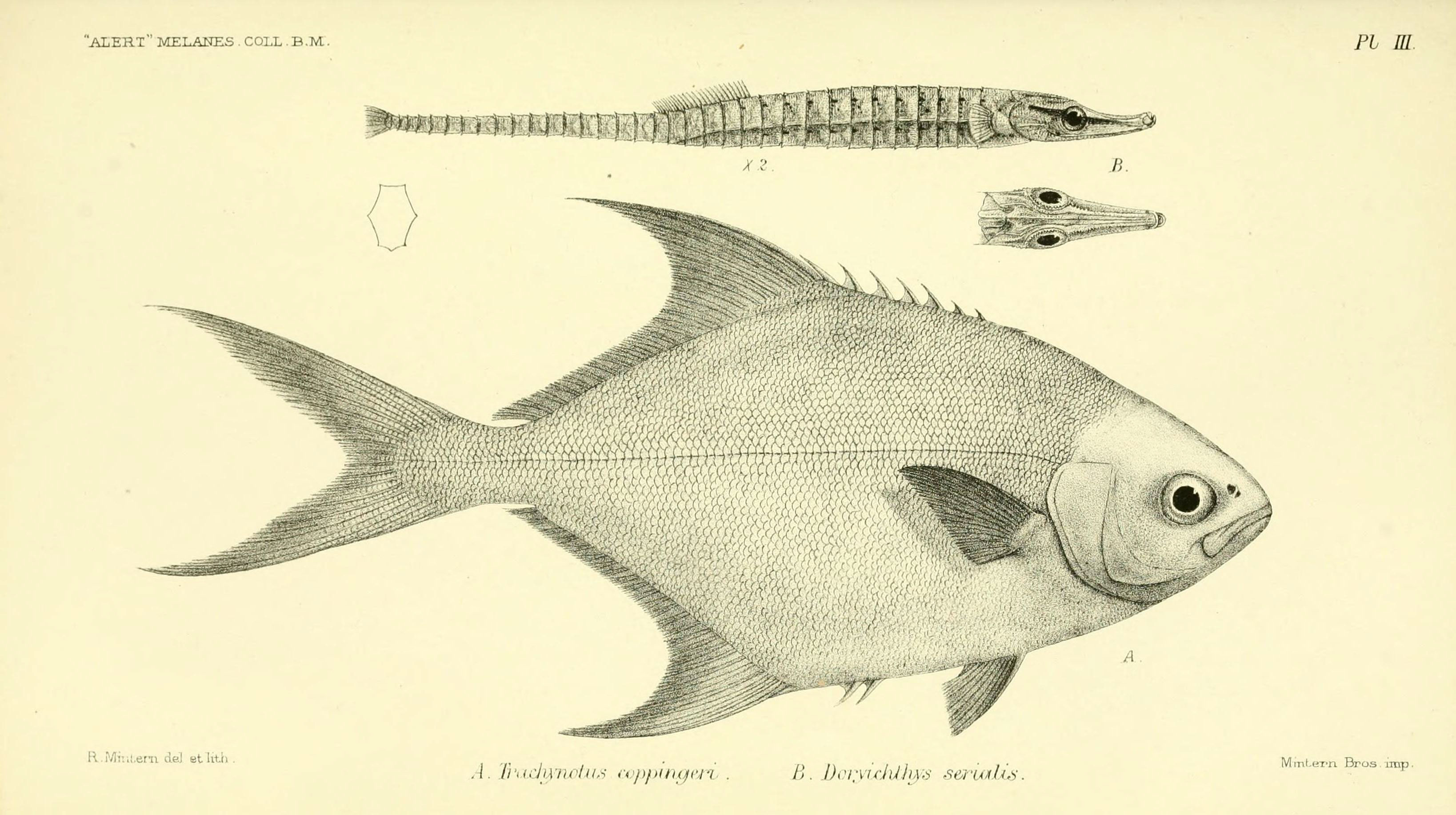
- Choeroichthys brachysoma at top

Conservation status
- Least Concern (IUCN 3.1)

Scientific classification
- Kingdom: Animalia
- Phylum: Chordata
- Class: Actinopterygii
- Order: Syngnathiformes
- Family: Syngnathidae
- Genus: Choeroichthys
- Species: C. brachysoma

Binomial name
- Choeroichthys brachysoma Bleeker, 1855

Synonyms
- Syngnathus brachysoma Bleeker, 1855; Dooryichthys brachysoma (Bleeker, 1855); Choeroichthys valencienni Kaup, 1856; Doryichthys valenciennii (Kaup, 1856); Doryichthys serialis Günther, 1884

= Choeroichthys brachysoma =

Short-bodied pipefish

Species of fish

Choeroichthys brachysoma (short-bodied pipefish or Pacific short-bodied pipefish) is a species of marine fish of the family Syngnathidae.

== Overview ==
It is found in the Indo-Pacific, from the Red Sea and East Africa to the Society Islands, the Philippines, Guam, and northern Australia. It inhabits tide pools, seagrass, rocky coastlines, mangroves, and coral reef areas at depths of 2–25 metres (6.6–82.0 ft), where it can grow to lengths of 7 centimetres (2.8 in). C. brachysoma shows sexual dimorphism, the females are slender with two rows of black spots along their flanks, while the males have a shorter, wider body marked with scattered, small white spots. This species is ovoviviparous, with males carrying eggs in a brood pouch until giving birth to live young. Males may brood at 3.5–4 centimetres (1.4–1.6 in).
