= Pseudochromis dixurus =

Scientific classification
- Kingdom: Animalia
- Phylum: Chordata
- Class: Actinopterygii
- Order: Blenniiformes
- Family: Pseudochromidae
- Genus: Pseudochromis
- Species: P. dixurus

Binomial name
- Pseudochromis dixurus Lubbock, 1975

Species of fish

Pseudochromis dixurus, the fork-tail dottyback, is a species of ray-finned fish found in the Red Sea and the Indian Ocean which is a member of the family Pseudochromidae. This species reaches a length of 9 cm (3.5 in).
