= Gymnothorax punctatus =

Conservation status
- Least Concern (IUCN 3.1)

Scientific classification
- Kingdom: Animalia
- Phylum: Chordata
- Class: Actinopterygii
- Division: Teleostei
- Order: Anguilliformes
- Family: Muraenidae
- Genus: Gymnothorax
- Species: G. punctatus

Binomial name
- Gymnothorax punctatus Bloch & J. G. Schneider, 1801

Species of fish

Gymnothorax punctatus is a moray eel found in coral reefs in the Red Sea. It was first described by Marcus Elieser Bloch and Johann Gottlob Schneider in 1801, and is commonly known as the Red Sea whitespotted moray or the whitespotted moray.
