= Snakefish =

Snakefish is a colloquial term used for a number of species of fish that resemble snakes. Trachinocephalus myops, native to the Atlantic ocean, is known by this name in particular.

== See also ==
- Snakehead fish
- Hadag Nahash, an Israeli band whose name translates to 'snakefish'
- Reedfish, a snakelike fish found in tropical West Africa.
