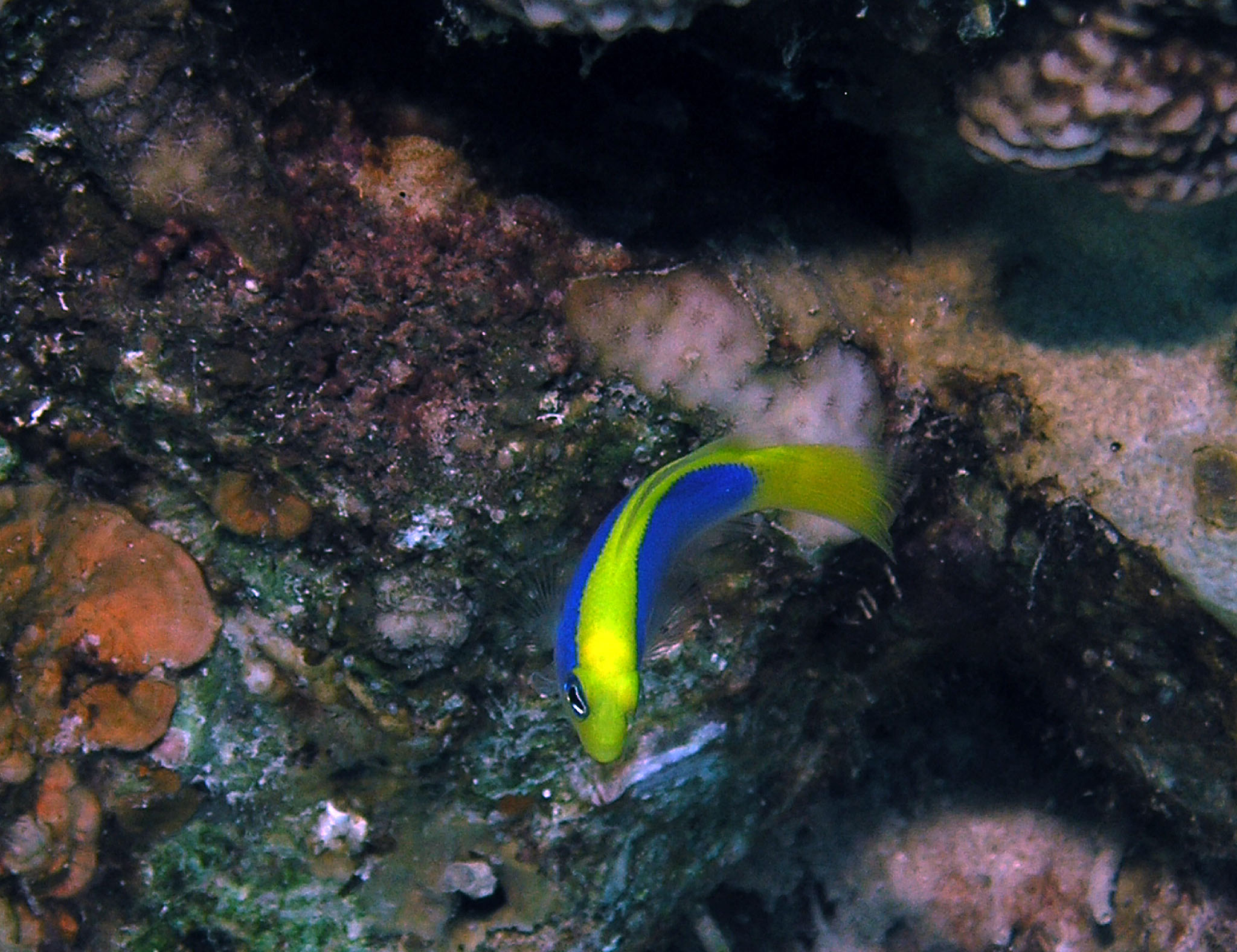
- Sunrise Dottyback

Scientific classification
- Kingdom: Animalia
- Phylum: Chordata
- Class: Actinopterygii
- Order: Blenniiformes
- Family: Pseudochromidae
- Genus: Pseudochromis
- Species: P. flavivertex

Binomial name
- Pseudochromis flavivertex Rüppell, 1835

= Pseudochromis flavivertex =

Species of fish

Pseudochromis flavivertex, the sunrise dottyback, is a species of ray-finned fish from the Western Indian Ocean which is a member of the family Pseudochromidae. It occasionally makes its way into the aquarium trade. It grows to a size of 7.2 -7.5 cm in length as male, and 6.5 cm as a female. It eats various benthic worms and crustaceans.
