= Maimed snake eel =

Scientific classification
- Kingdom: Animalia
- Phylum: Chordata
- Class: Actinopterygii
- Order: Anguilliformes
- Family: Ophichthidae
- Genus: Muraenichthys
- Species: M. schultzei

Binomial name
- Muraenichthys schultzei Bleeker, 1857

Synonyms
- Muraenichthys schultzi Bleeker, 1857; Muraenichthys schulzei Bleeker, 1857

Species of fish

The Maimed snake eel (Muraenichthys schultzei, also known as the Aimed snake eel, the Bleeker's worm-eel, or the Schultz's worm eel) is an eel in the family Ophichthidae (worm/snake eels). It was described by Pieter Bleeker in 1857. It is a marine, tropical eel which is known from the Indo-Pacific, including the Red Sea, East Africa, Samoa, the Ryukyu Islands, Australia, and Micronesia. It dwells at a depth range of 1 to 13 metres (3.3 to 42.7 ft), and inhabits coral reefs and lagoons, where it forms burrows in soft benthic sediments. Males can reach a maximum total length of 24 centimetres (9.4 in), but more commonly reach a TL of 8 centimetres (3.1 in).

The Maimed snake eel is of minor commercial interest to fisheries. It is usually bagged, netted or dug out, and sold for shark bait.
