= Minute wrasse =

Conservation status
- Least Concern (IUCN 3.1)

Scientific classification
- Kingdom: Animalia
- Phylum: Chordata
- Class: Actinopterygii
- Order: Labriformes
- Family: Labridae
- Subfamily: Julidinae
- Genus: Minilabrus; J. E. Randall & Dor, 1980
- Species: M. striatus

Binomial name
- Minilabrus striatus J. E. Randall & Dor, 1980

Species of fish

The minute wrasse (Minilabrus striatus) is a species of wrasse endemic to the Red Sea, where it can be found down to about 12 m (39 ft) over reefs. This species grows to 6 cm (2.4 in) in total length. Minilabrus striatus is the only known member of its genus.
