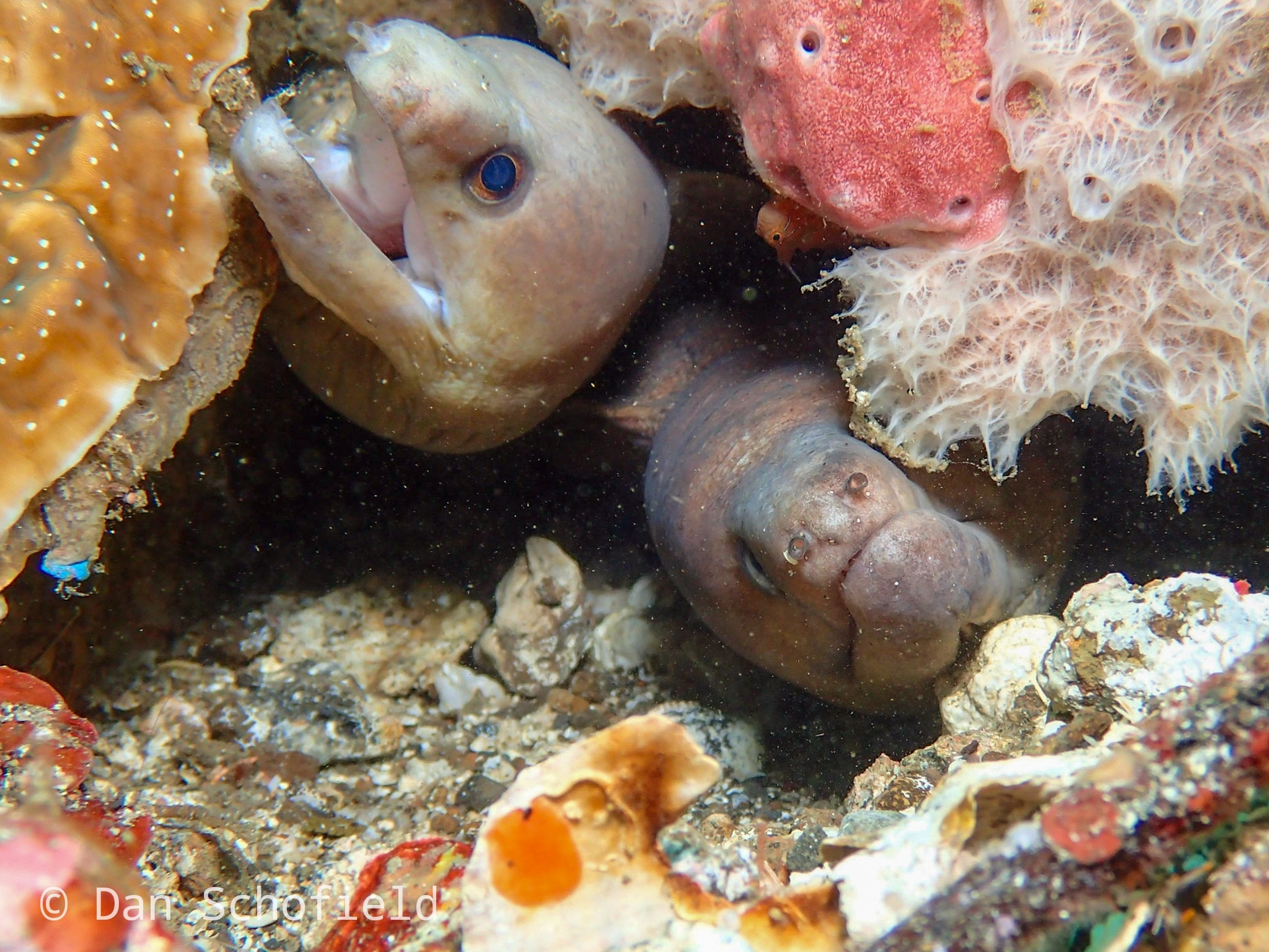
- Two drab morays in North Sulawesi, Indonesia

Conservation status
- Least Concern (IUCN 3.1)

Scientific classification
- Kingdom: Animalia
- Phylum: Chordata
- Class: Actinopterygii
- Order: Anguilliformes
- Family: Muraenidae
- Genus: Gymnothorax
- Species: G. monochrous

Binomial name
- Gymnothorax monochrous (Bleeker, 1856)

= Drab moray eel =

Species of ray-finned fish

The drab moray (Gymnothorax monochrous) is a moray eel found in coral reefs in the Pacific and Indian Oceans. It was first named by Pieter Bleeker in 1856, and is also commonly known as the brown moray, monochrome moray, monotone moray, or plain moray eel.
