= Gymnothorax punctatofasciatus =

Scientific classification
- Kingdom: Animalia
- Phylum: Chordata
- Class: Actinopterygii
- Order: Anguilliformes
- Family: Muraenidae
- Genus: Gymnothorax
- Species: G. punctatofasciatus

Binomial name
- Gymnothorax punctatofasciatus Bleeker, 1863

Species of fish

Gymnothorax punctatofasciatus is a moray eel found in coral reefs in the Pacific and Indian Oceans. It was first named by Pieter Bleeker in 1863, and is commonly known as the bars'n spots moray.
