= Enneapterygius altipinnis =

Conservation status
- Least Concern (IUCN 3.1)

Scientific classification
- Kingdom: Animalia
- Phylum: Chordata
- Class: Actinopterygii
- Order: Blenniiformes
- Family: Tripterygiidae
- Genus: Enneapterygius
- Species: E. altipinnis

Binomial name
- Enneapterygius altipinnis E. Clark, 1980

Species of fish

Enneapterygius altipinnis also known as the highfin triplefin is a species of triplefin blenny in the genus Enneapterygius. It is found in the Red Sea. It was regarded as a synonym of Enneapterygius tutuilae but in 2018 the species was reinstated as being valid.
