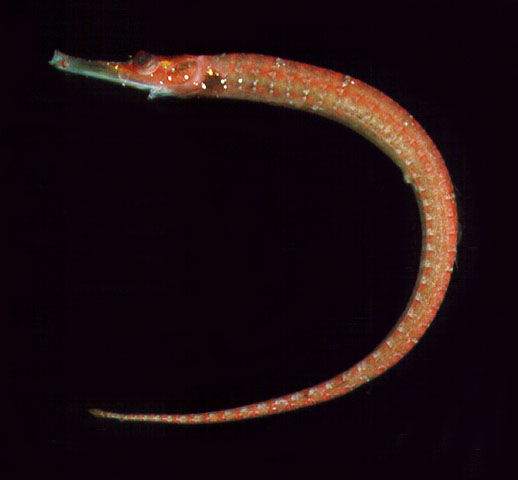

Conservation status
- Least Concern (IUCN 3.1)

Scientific classification
- Domain: Eukaryota
- Kingdom: Animalia
- Phylum: Chordata
- Class: Actinopterygii
- Order: Syngnathiformes
- Family: Syngnathidae
- Genus: Cosmocampus
- Species: C. maxweberi

Binomial name
- Cosmocampus maxweberi (Whitley, 1933)

Synonyms
- Syngnathus maxweberi Whitley, 1933

= Cosmocampus maxweberi =

Maxweber's pipefish

Species of fish

Cosmocampus maxweberi (Maxweber's pipefish) is a species of marine fish of the family Syngnathidae. It is found in the Red Sea from Sumatra to Tonga and Samoa, and from the Marshall Islands to the Great Barrier Reef. Adults live in reefs and reef-rubble to depths of 36 m, while planktonic juveniles have been found in the top 85m of 1500–2000 m water columns. Adults are expected to feed on small crustaceans, similar to other pipefish, and can grow to lengths of 10 cm. This species is ovoviviparous, with males carrying eggs until giving birth to live young.

== Etymology ==
The specific name honours the German-Dutch zoologist and biogeographer Max Carl Wilhelm Weber (1852-1937).

== Identifying Features ==
This species is a pale red to tan colour, with a dark lateral stripe on the snout and brown on the head. It often has dark brown bars on its ventral and lower sides.
