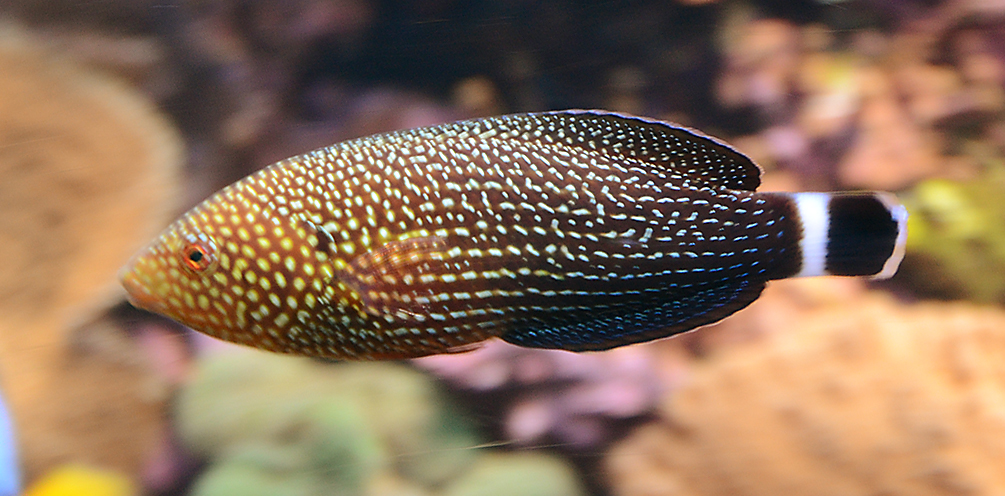

Conservation status
- Data Deficient (IUCN 3.1)

Scientific classification
- Kingdom: Animalia
- Phylum: Chordata
- Class: Actinopterygii
- Division: Teleostei
- Order: Labriformes
- Family: Labridae
- Genus: Anampses
- Species: A. lineatus

Binomial name
- Anampses lineatus J. E. Randall, 1972

Synonyms
- Anampses melanurus lineatus J. E. Randall, 1972

= Lined wrasse =

Species of fish

Anampses lineatus, commonly known as the lined wrasse, is a species of wrasse native to the Indo-Pacific from the Red Sea to South Africa east to Bali. This species can be found at depths from 10 to 45 m (33 to 148 ft) (though usually below 20 m (66 ft)) in lagoons and on reefs. It can reach a length of 13 cm (5.1 in). It can be found in the aquarium trade.
