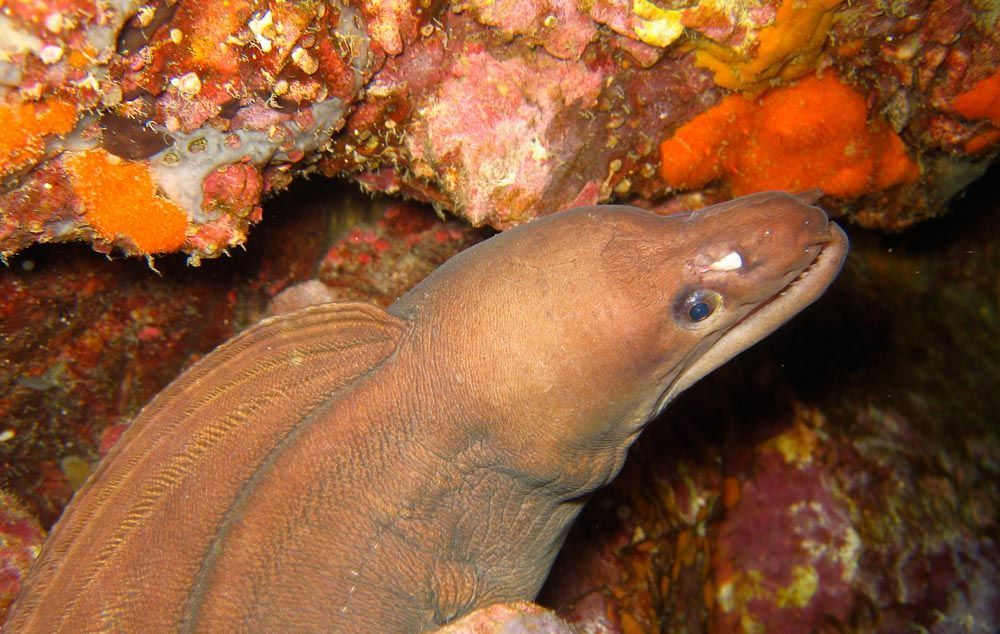

Conservation status
- Least Concern (IUCN 3.1)

Scientific classification
- Kingdom: Animalia
- Phylum: Chordata
- Class: Actinopterygii
- Order: Anguilliformes
- Family: Muraenidae
- Genus: Gymnothorax
- Species: G. moluccensis

Binomial name
- Gymnothorax moluccensis Bleeker, 1864

= Moluccan moray eel =

Species of fish

The Moluccan moray eel (Gymnothorax moluccensis) is a moray eel found in coral reefs in the western Pacific and Indian Oceans. It was first named by Pieter Bleeker in 1864.
