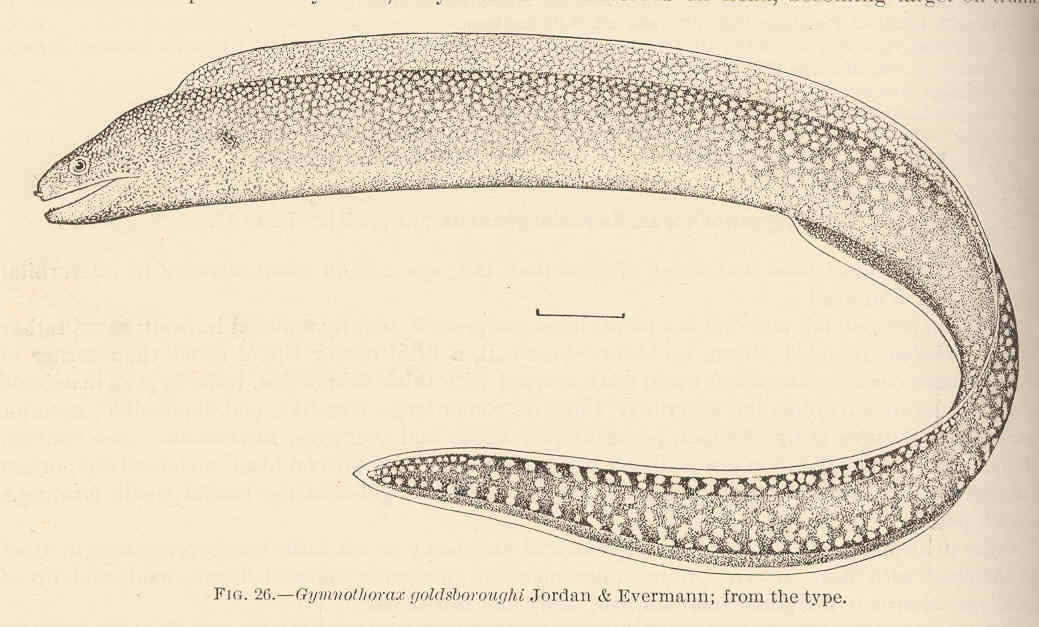
- Gymnothorax goldsboroughi Jordan & Evermann

Conservation status
- Least Concern (IUCN 3.1)

Scientific classification
- Kingdom: Animalia
- Phylum: Chordata
- Class: Actinopterygii
- Order: Anguilliformes
- Family: Muraenidae
- Genus: Gymnothorax
- Species: G. elegans

Binomial name
- Gymnothorax elegans Bliss, 1883

Synonyms
- Lycodontis elegans (Bliss, 1883)

= Elegant moray eel =

Species of fish

The elegant moray (Gymnothorax elegans), or Goldsborough's moray eel, is a moray eel found in deep water (90-450 meters) in the Pacific and Indian Oceans. It was first named by Bliss in 1883.
