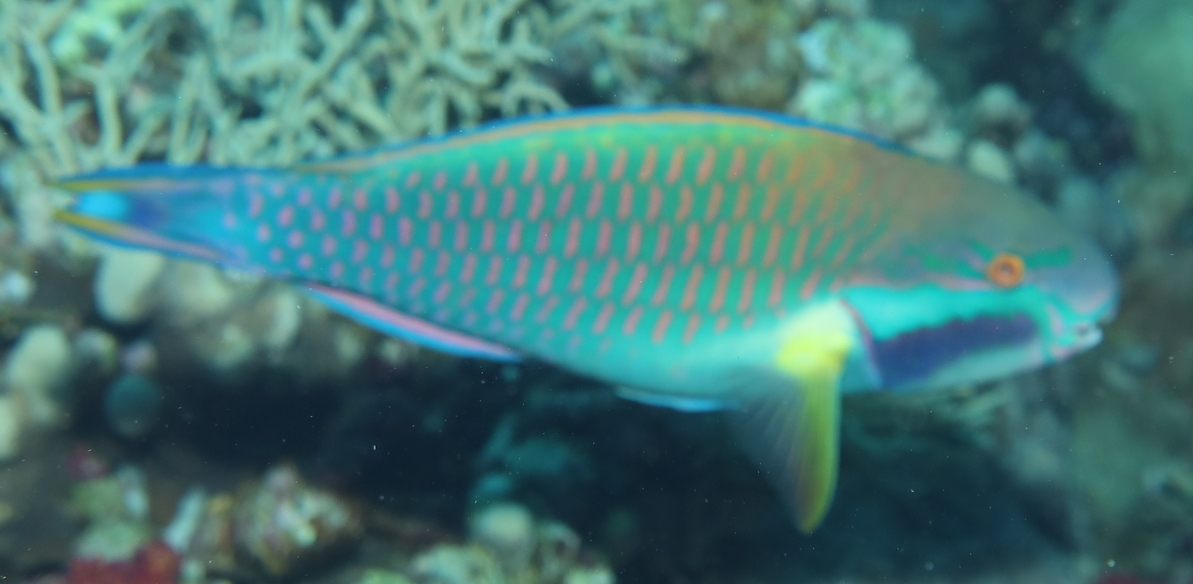

Conservation status
- Least Concern (IUCN 3.1)

Scientific classification
- Kingdom: Animalia
- Phylum: Chordata
- Class: Actinopterygii
- Order: Labriformes
- Family: Labridae
- Genus: Chlorurus
- Species: C. genazonatus

Binomial name
- Chlorurus genazonatus (Randall & Bruce, 1983)

Synonyms
- Scarus genazonatus Randall & Bruce, 1983

= Chlorurus genazonatus =

Species of ray-finned fishes

Chlorurus genazonatus, also known as the Sinai parrotfish, is a species of marine ray-finned fish, a parrotfish from the family Scaridae.

== Distribution ==
This species' main habitats are western Indian Ocean, Red Sea and the Gulf of Aden and Gulf of Aqaba.

This species is also found in Egypt, Somalia, Palestine, Jordan and Saudi Arabia.

== Description ==
The maximum length of this species is 31 cm (12 in).

== Biology ==
This species inhabits reef slopes and feeds on benthic algae.

== Environment ==
Chlorurus genazonatus is a tropical, reef associated fish found at least below 6 m (20 ft) but usually found below 20 m (70 ft).

== Life cycle ==
This species is oviparous and pairs up distinctly during breeding.

== Relationship with humans ==
This species is completely harmless towards humans. It has minor commercial value.

== See also ==
- List of species in the genus Chlorurus
