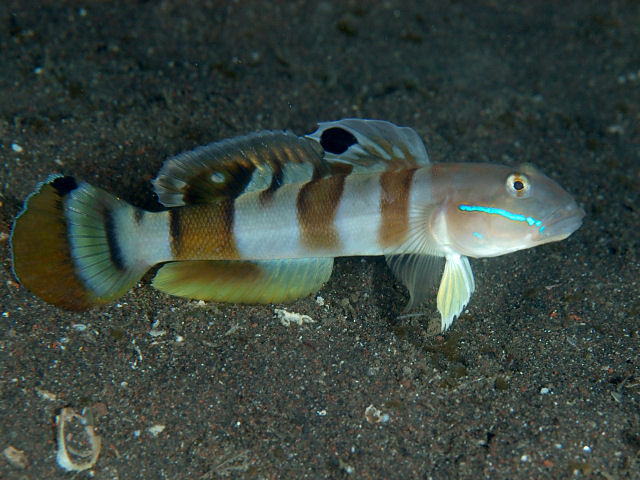

Conservation status
- Least Concern (IUCN 3.1)

Scientific classification
- Domain: Eukaryota
- Kingdom: Animalia
- Phylum: Chordata
- Class: Actinopterygii
- Order: Gobiiformes
- Family: Gobiidae
- Genus: Valenciennea
- Species: V. wardii

Binomial name
- Valenciennea wardii (Playfair (fr), 1867)

Synonyms
- Eleotris wardii Playfair, 1867; Valenciennea wardi (Playfair, 1867); Eleotris ellioti F. Day, 1888; Valenciennea phaeochalina S. Tanaka (I), 1917; Valenciennea nigromaculata Herre, 1932

= Valenciennea wardii =

Species of fish

Valenciennea wardii, Ward's sleeper, Ward's sleeper goby, is a species of goby native to the Indian Ocean and the western Pacific Ocean in bays, reefs and lagoons at depths of from 12 to 35 metres (39 to 115 ft). It can be found on sandy or silty substrates. This species can reach a length of 15 centimetres (5.9 in) SL. It can also be found in the aquarium trade. The specific name honours the United Kingdom diplomat Swinburne Ward (1830-1897) who was Her Majesty's Civil Commissioner for the Seychelles, although this species was described from specimens collected off Zanzibar.
