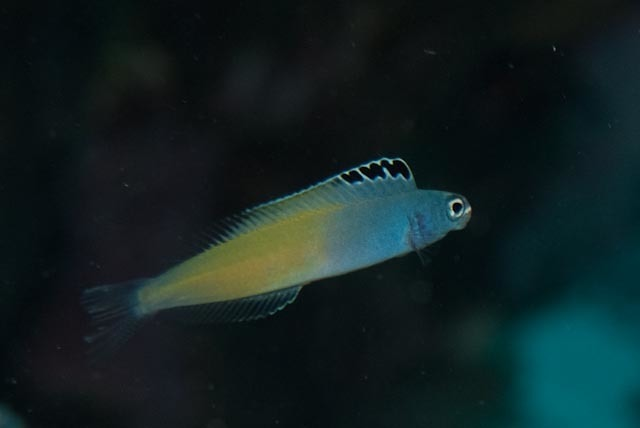

Conservation status
- Least Concern (IUCN 3.1)

Scientific classification
- Kingdom: Animalia
- Phylum: Chordata
- Class: Actinopterygii
- Order: Blenniiformes
- Family: Blenniidae
- Genus: Plagiotremus
- Species: P. townsendi

Binomial name
- Plagiotremus townsendi (Regan, 1905)

Synonyms
- Petroscirtes townsendi Regan, 1905

= Plagiotremus townsendi =

Species of fish

Plagiotremus townsendi, Townsend's fangblenny, is a species of combtooth blenny found in coral reefs in the western Indian Ocean. This species reaches a length of 6 centimetres (2.4 in) TL.

== Diet ==
This fish feeds on mucus secreted by other fish, according to, citing Springer and Smith-Vaniz (1972).
