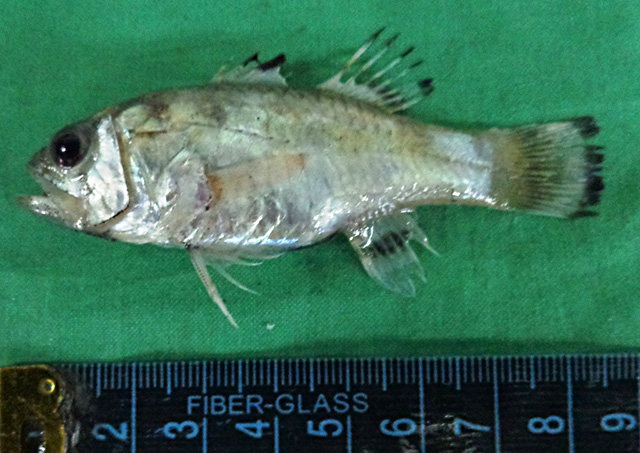

Scientific classification
- Kingdom: Animalia
- Phylum: Chordata
- Class: Actinopterygii
- Order: Gobiiformes
- Family: Apogonidae
- Genus: Jaydia
- Species: J. truncata

Binomial name
- Jaydia truncata (Bleeker, 1855)

Synonyms
- Apogon truncatus Bleeker, 1855; Apogonichthys taeniopterus Bleeker, 1860; Apogon arafurae Günther, 1880

= Flagfin cardinalfish =

Species of fish

The flagfin cardinalfish (Jaydia truncata) is a species of ray-finned fish from the cardinalfish family of Apogonidae. It is an Indo-Pacific species which is found from the Red Sea and the Persian Gulf to Australia and Japan. It is associated with reefs in the inshore waters and continental shelf where occurs at depths from the surface to 132 metres (433 ft) and is a nocturnal species. It is the type species of the genus Jaydia.
