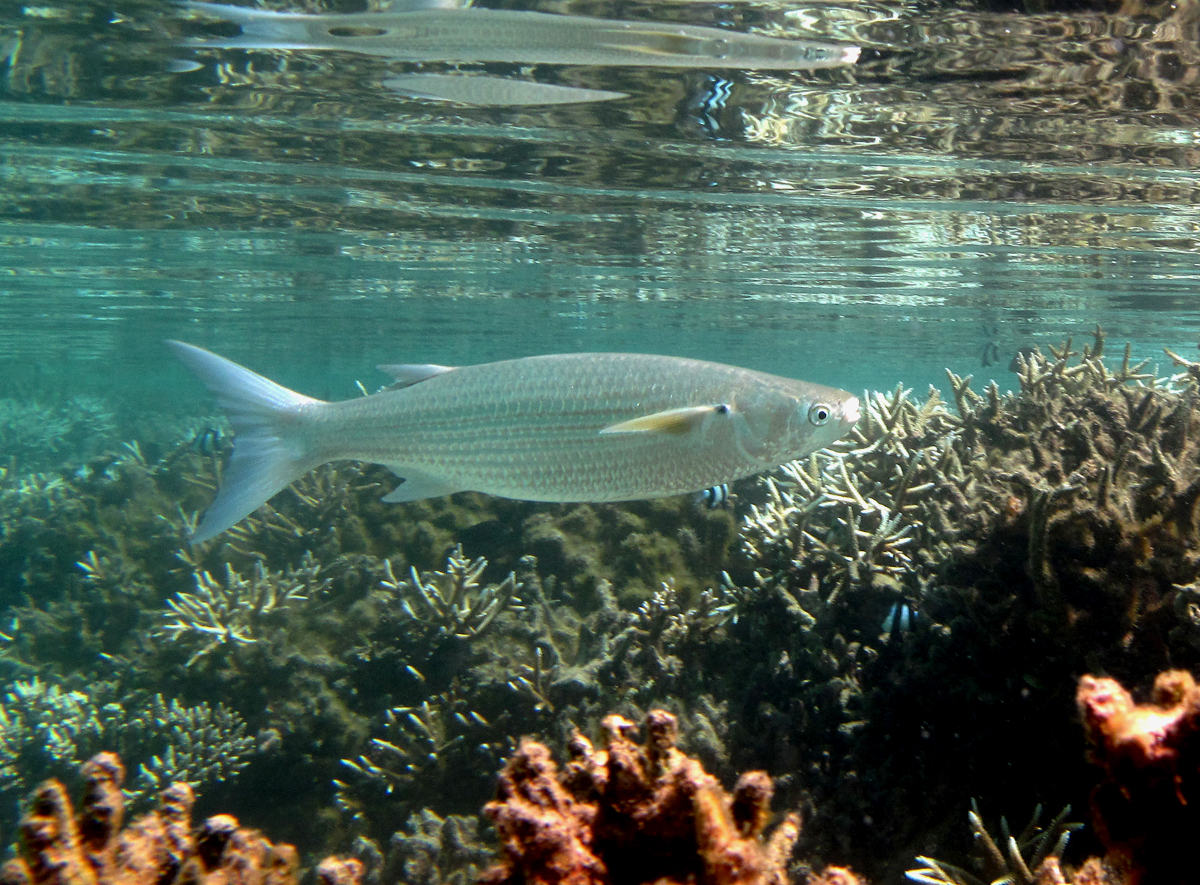

Scientific classification
- Kingdom: Animalia
- Phylum: Chordata
- Class: Actinopterygii
- Order: Mugiliformes
- Family: Mugilidae
- Genus: Plicomugil
- Species: P. labiosus

Binomial name
- Plicomugil labiosus (Valenciennes, 1836)

Synonyms
- Mugil labiosus Valenciennes, 1836; Crenimugil labiosus (Valenciennes, 1836); Oedalechilus labiosus (Valenciennes, 1836)

= Hornlip mullet =

Species of ray-finned fish

The hornlip mullet (Plicomugil labiosus) is a species of ray-finned fish in the mullet family from the Indo-Pacific from the Red Sea to Micronesia. It is the only species in the monospecific genus Plicomugil.
