= Mimoblennius cirrosus =

Conservation status
- Least Concern (IUCN 3.1)

Scientific classification
- Kingdom: Animalia
- Phylum: Chordata
- Class: Actinopterygii
- Order: Blenniiformes
- Family: Blenniidae
- Genus: Mimoblennius
- Species: M. cirrosus

Binomial name
- Mimoblennius cirrosus Smith-Vaniz & V. G. Springer, 1971

Species of fish

Mimoblennius cirrosus, the fringed blenny, is a species of combtooth blenny found in coral reefs in the western Indian Ocean. This species grows to a length of 5.4 centimetres (2.1 in) TL.
