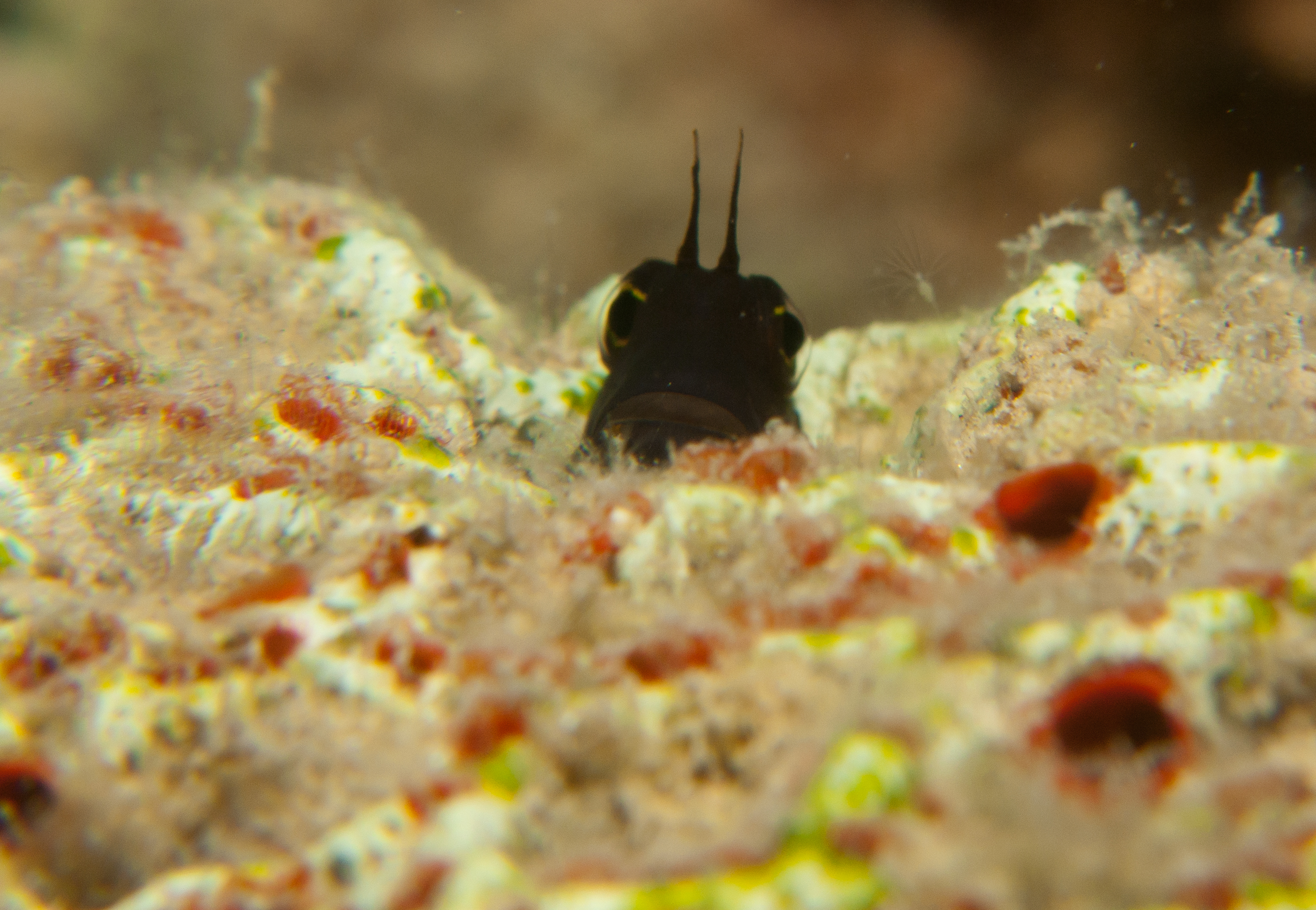

Conservation status
- Least Concern (IUCN 3.1)

Scientific classification
- Kingdom: Animalia
- Phylum: Chordata
- Class: Actinopterygii
- Order: Blenniiformes
- Family: Blenniidae
- Genus: Ecsenius
- Species: E. frontalis

Binomial name
- Ecsenius frontalis (Valenciennes, 1836)

Synonyms
- Salarias frontalis (Valenciennes, 1836); Salarias nigrovittatus (Rüppell, 1838); Ecsenius albicaudattus (Lotan, 1969)

= Ecsenius frontalis =

Species of fish

Ecsenius frontalis, known commonly as the smooth-fin blenny in Micronesia, is a species of combtooth blenny in the genus Ecsenius. It is found in coral reefs in the western Indian Ocean, in several gulfs in the Red Sea. It can reach a maximum length of 8 centimetres. Blennies in this species primarily feed off of plants, including benthic algae and weeds, and are commercial aquarium fish.
