= Popeye (disambiguation) =

Popeye is a comic and cartoon character created by E.C. Segar in 1929

- Popeye the Sailor (film series), an animated series of short films, released between 1933 and 1957
  - Popeye the Sailor (film), the first film in the series
- Popeye the Sailor (TV series), a 1960 American television series
- Popeye (film), a 1980 film starring Robin Williams
- Popeye (video game), a 1982 video game
- Popeye (Game Boy video game), a 1990 video game for the Game Boy

Popeye may also refer to:

== Fictional characters ==
- Jimmy "Popeye" Doyle, in the films The French Connection, French Connection II and Popeye Doyle
- Popeye (Faulkner character), in William Faulkner's novel Sanctuary

== Organizations and brands ==
- Popeye (magazine), Japanese men's fashion magazine
- Popeye Moto Club, a former outlaw motorcycle club in Quebec, Canada
- Popeyes, a chain of fried chicken fast food restaurants

== People ==
- Hank Erickson (1907–1964), American professional baseball catcher
- Greg Halford (born 1984), English footballer nicknamed "Popeye" for his missile-like throw-ins
- Popeye Jones (born 1970), American National Basketball Association assistant coach and former player
- Fred Lucas (aviator) (1915–1993), New Zealand World War II and commercial aviator, farmer and tourist operator
- Jean-Paul van Poppel (born 1962), Dutch former racing cyclist
- Miloš Stojanović (footballer, born 1984), Serbian footballer
- Jhon Jairo Velásquez (1962–2020), former hitman for Pablo Escobar and the Medellín drugs cartel
- Robert Wynn (soldier) (1921–2000), World War II US Army soldier, portrayed in the miniseries Band of Brothers
- Don Zimmer (1931–2014), former Major League Baseball player, coach and manager
- Michael Vogelsang, member of the band Farside, best known for voicing Farkas and other characters in Skyrim

== Species ==
- Popeye catalufa, in the genus Pristigenys
- Popeye shiner, in the genus Notropis
- Popeye grenadier, in the genus Coryphaenoides

== Other uses ==
- Popeye (boat), a series of historic pleasure launches used on the Torrens River, Adelaide, Australia
- Operation Popeye, a US military operation to increase rains over Vietnam during the Vietnam War
- Popeye (missile), Israeli standoff air-to-surface missile, when used by the US code named AGM-142 Have Nap
- Popeye (seal), a female harbor seal of Friday Harbor, San Juan Island, Washington, US
- Popeye, software for handling chess problems

== See also ==
- "Popeye the Hitchhiker", a 1962 song by Chubby Checker
- Pop-Eyes, 1983 album by Danielle Dax
- Pop Eyed, a 1996 New Zealand compilation album
- Popeye the Sailor (disambiguation)
