= Catalufa =

Catalufa is the common name for three species of fish belonging to the family Priacanthidae:

- Heteropriacanthus cruentatus
- Priacanthus arenatus
- Pristigenys serrula - the popeye catalufa

The word catalufa is also used in several Caribbean countries as the Spanish or French language common name for a number of other Priacanthidae species. The French-speaking islands of Martinique and Guadeloupe also refer to the species Rhomboplites aurorubens (family Lutjanidae) as a catalufa.

Catalufas are also commonly called "bigeyes" (the common name for all Priacanthidae).
