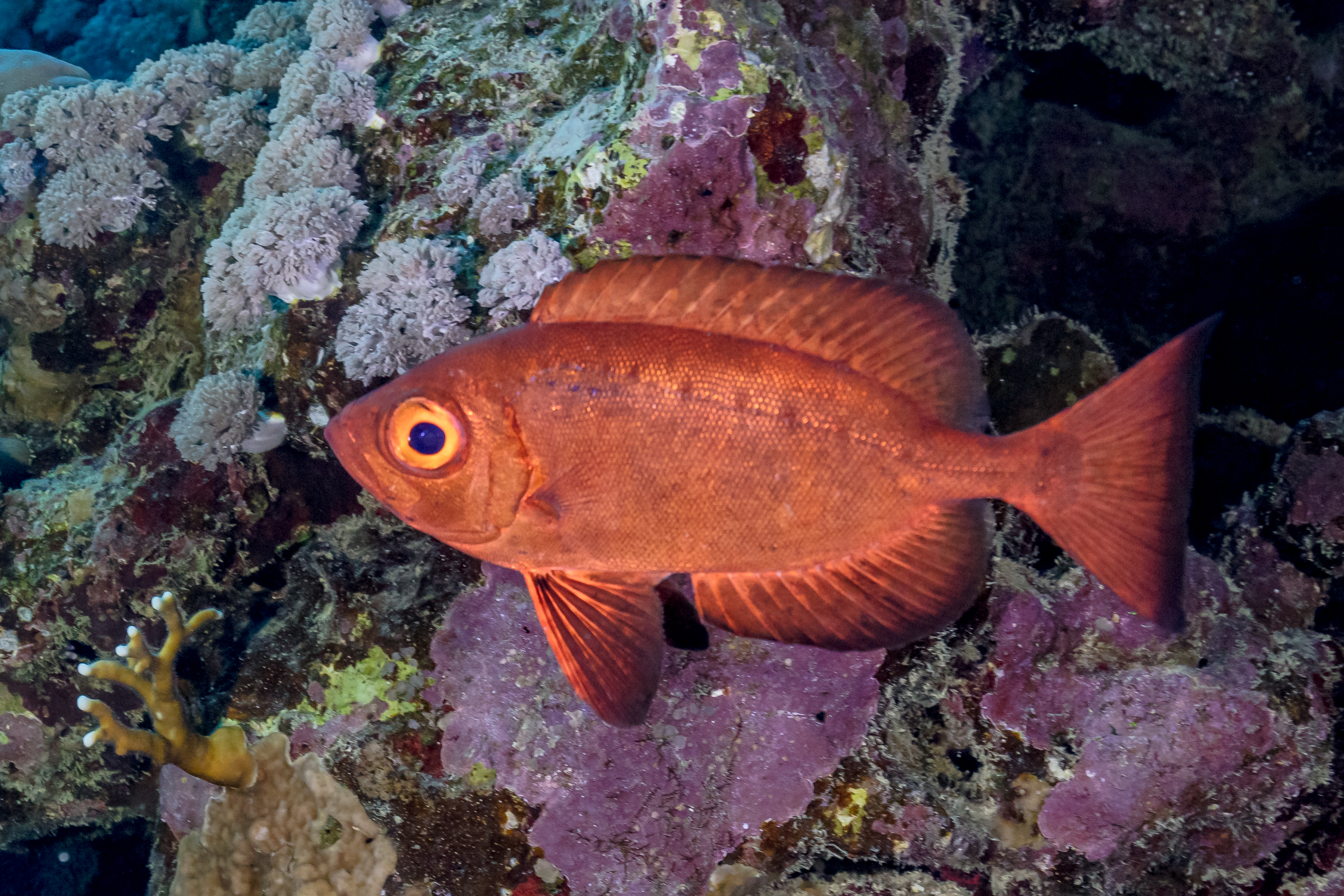
- Priacanthus hamrur

Scientific classification
- Kingdom: Animalia
- Phylum: Chordata
- Class: Actinopterygii
- Division: Teleostei
- Order: Acanthuriformes
- Family: Priacanthidae
- Genus: Priacanthus; Oken, 1817

Type species
- Anthias macrophthalmus Bloch, 1792

Synonyms
- Boops Gronow, 1854

= Priacanthus =

Genus of ray-finned fishes

Priacanthus is a genus of marine ray-finned fishes belonging to the family Priacanthidae, the bigeyes. As of 2026 there are 14 extant species in the genus.

== Species ==
The following species are classified within the genus Priacanthus:

- Priacanthus alalaua Jordan & Evermann, 1903 - Alalaua
- Priacanthus arenatus Cuvier, 1829 - Atlantic bigeye
- Priacanthus blochii Bleeker, 1853 - Paeony bulleye
- Priacanthus fitchi Starnes, 1988
- Priacanthus gracilis Hashimoto & Motomura, 2024
- Priacanthus hamrur (Forsskål, 1775) - Moontail bullseye
- Priacanthus macracanthus Cuvier, 1829 - Red bigeye
- Priacanthus meeki Jenkins, 1903 - Hawaiian bigeye
- Priacanthus nasca Starnes, 1988
- Priacanthus prolixus Starnes, 1988 - Elongate bulleye
- Priacanthus sagittarius Starnes, 1988 - Arrow bulleye
- Priacanthus starnesi Hashimoto & Motomura, 2026
- Priacanthus tayenus Richardson, 1846 - Purple-spotted bigeye
- Priacanthus zaiserae Starnes & Moyer, 1988

=== Fossil record ===
- †Priacanthus artus Danil'chenko, 1980
- †Priacanthus croaticus (Gorjanovic-Kramberger, 1885)
- †Priacanthus fortis Danil'chenko, 1980
- †Priacanthus liui Tao, 1993
- †Priacanthus longispinus Lednev, 1914
- †Priacanthus pellegrinoi Bannikov & Carnevale, 2026
- †Priacanthus pietrensis Ciobanu, 1977
- †Priacanthus robustus Bogatsov, 1933
- †Priacanthus spinosus Weiler, 1938

== Cladogram ==
- Priacanthidae
  - Priacanthus
    - Priacanthus alalaua
    - Priacanthus arenatus
    - Priacanthus blochii
    - Priacanthus fitchi
    - Priacanthus hamrur
    - Priacanthus macracanthus
    - Priacanthus meeki
    - Priacanthus nasca
    - Priacanthus prolixus
    - Priacanthus sagittarius
    - Priacanthus tayenus
    - Priacanthus zaiserae
  - Cookeolus
  - Heteropriacanthus
  - Pristigenys
