= Glass eye (disambiguation) =

Glass eye is a common term for an ocular prosthesis.

Glass eye, glasseye or glass eyes may also refer to:

- Glass Eye (band), an American art rock band primarily active from 1983 to 1993
- Glass Eye Pix, an American independent film studio
- "Glass Eyes", a song by Radiohead from the 2016 album A Moon Shaped Pool
- Heteropriacanthus, a genus of fish also known as glasseyes
- Priacanthus blochii, a species of fish also known as a glass-eye bigeye
