= Goggle eye =

Goggle eye or goggle-eye may refer to:

- Common wood-nymph (Cercyonis pegala), a butterfly
- Priacanthus blochii, a marine fish also known as Bloch's bigeye, blotched bigeye, paeony bulleye, and other names
- Priacanthus hamrur, a marine fish also known as the lunar-tailed bigeye or moontail bullseye
- Rock bass (Ambloplites rupestris), a freshwater fish
- Warmouth (Lepomis gulosus), a freshwater fish found in the Mississippi and other waters of the United States
- goggle eyed fish
