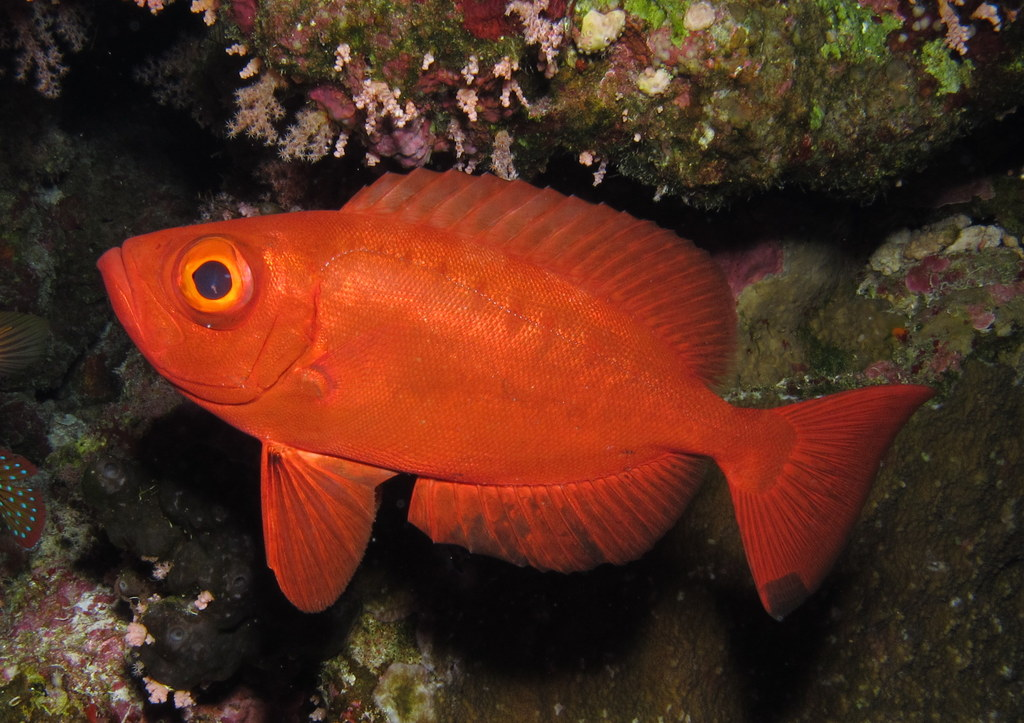
- In the Red Sea

Conservation status
- Least Concern (IUCN 3.1)

Scientific classification
- Kingdom: Animalia
- Phylum: Chordata
- Class: Actinopterygii
- Division: Teleostei
- Order: Acanthuriformes
- Family: Priacanthidae
- Genus: Priacanthus
- Species: P. hamrur

Binomial name
- Priacanthus hamrur (Forsskål, 1775)

Synonyms
- List: Sciaena hamrur Forsskål, 1775; Anthias macrophthalmus Bloch, 1792; Priacanthus fax Valenciennes, 1831; Priacanthus speculum Valenciennes, 1831; Priacanthus dubius Temminck & Schlegel, 1842; Boops asper Gronow, 1854; Priacanthus schlegelii Hilgendorf, 1879; Priacanthus longipinnis Borodin, 1932

= Priacanthus hamrur =

Species of fish

Priacanthus hamrur, the lunar-tailed bigeye, goggle eye, or moontail bullseye, is a species of marine fishes belonging to the family Priacanthidae.

== Distribution ==
This species is uncommon but widespread in the Indo-Pacific, from the Red Sea and southern Africa to French Polynesia, southern Japan, and Australia. It has been reported also from Easter Island. Two records have been reported from the Mediterranean Sea off Tunisia and Turkey respectively.

== Habitat ==
Priacanthus hamrur is a reef-associated species, living in tropical marine waters on outer reef slopes and rocky areas and in lagoons at depths of 8 to 250 meters (26 to 820 ft), but most commonly from 30 to 50 m (100 to 160 ft).

== Description ==
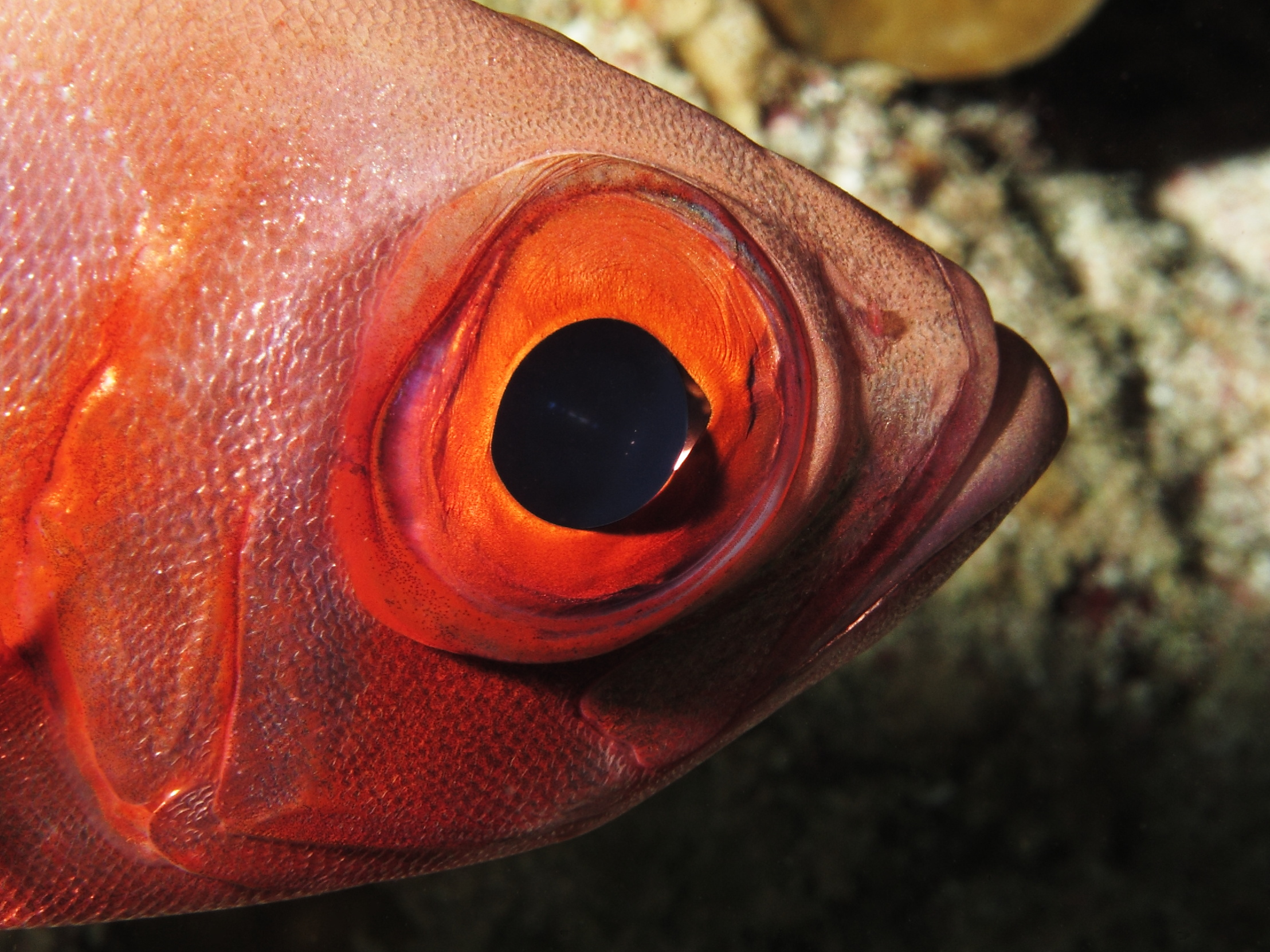
Eye close-up of P. hamrur

At sexual maturity the size of Priacanthus hamrur reaches 18–19 cm (7.1–7.5 in) in males, 19.1–20.0 cm (7.5–7.9 in) in females, but males can reach a maximum length of 45 cm. The body of the crescent-tail bigeye is relatively deep, strongly compressed laterally. The eyes are very large and red (even in case of silver livery). The mouth is oblique with a protruding lower jaw and small conical teeth. The extremity of the lower lip is above the median line of the body. The dorsal fin has 13 to 15 soft rays. The pelvic fins are very large. The caudal fin has a concave indented margin which may be crescent-shaped (hence the common name).

The body of these fishes goes through various phases of color, which may vary from orange to entirely red or entirely silver, or silver with six broad red bands (the first red bar crosses the eye). It is also capable of quickly changing the color. Sometimes it has a row of about fifteen small dark spots along the lateral line or large spots on upper side. The fins are red to light pink.

This species is rather similar and can be confused with Priacanthus blochii and with Heteropriacanthus cruentatus. Both these last species have the caudal fin only slightly rounded.

== Biology ==
Priacanthus hamrur feeds primarily at night on small fishes and small crustaceans and various invertebrates (small cephalopods, shrimp, crabs, polychaete worms, etc.). These fishes can be found throughout the year, with a peak in the month of August. Eggs, larvae and very young juveniles are pelagic. These fishes usually live solitary, but they may also form small aggregations and sometimes large schools in the open waters.

== Gallery ==
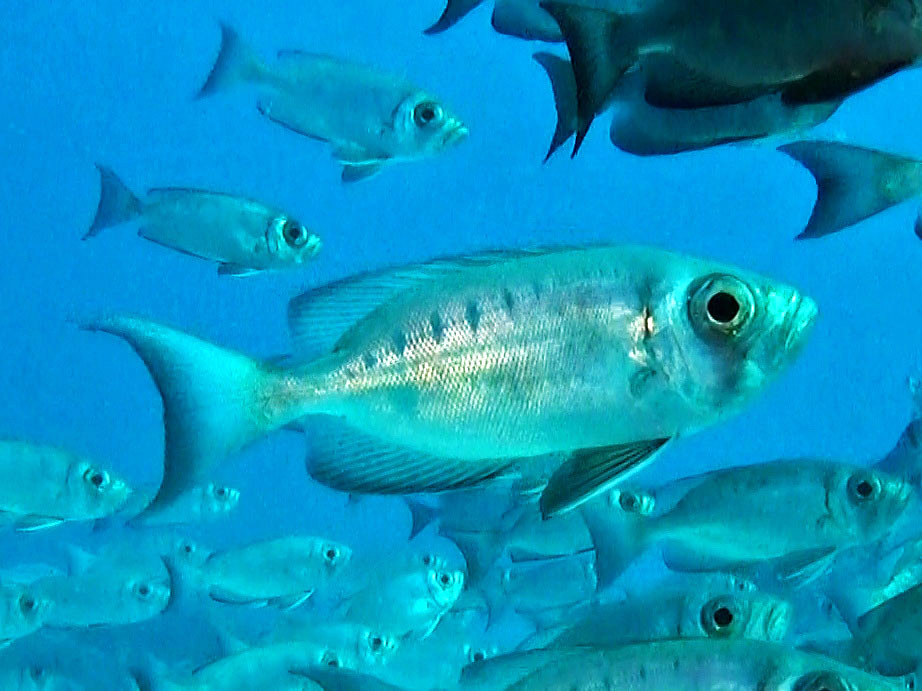
Silver phase

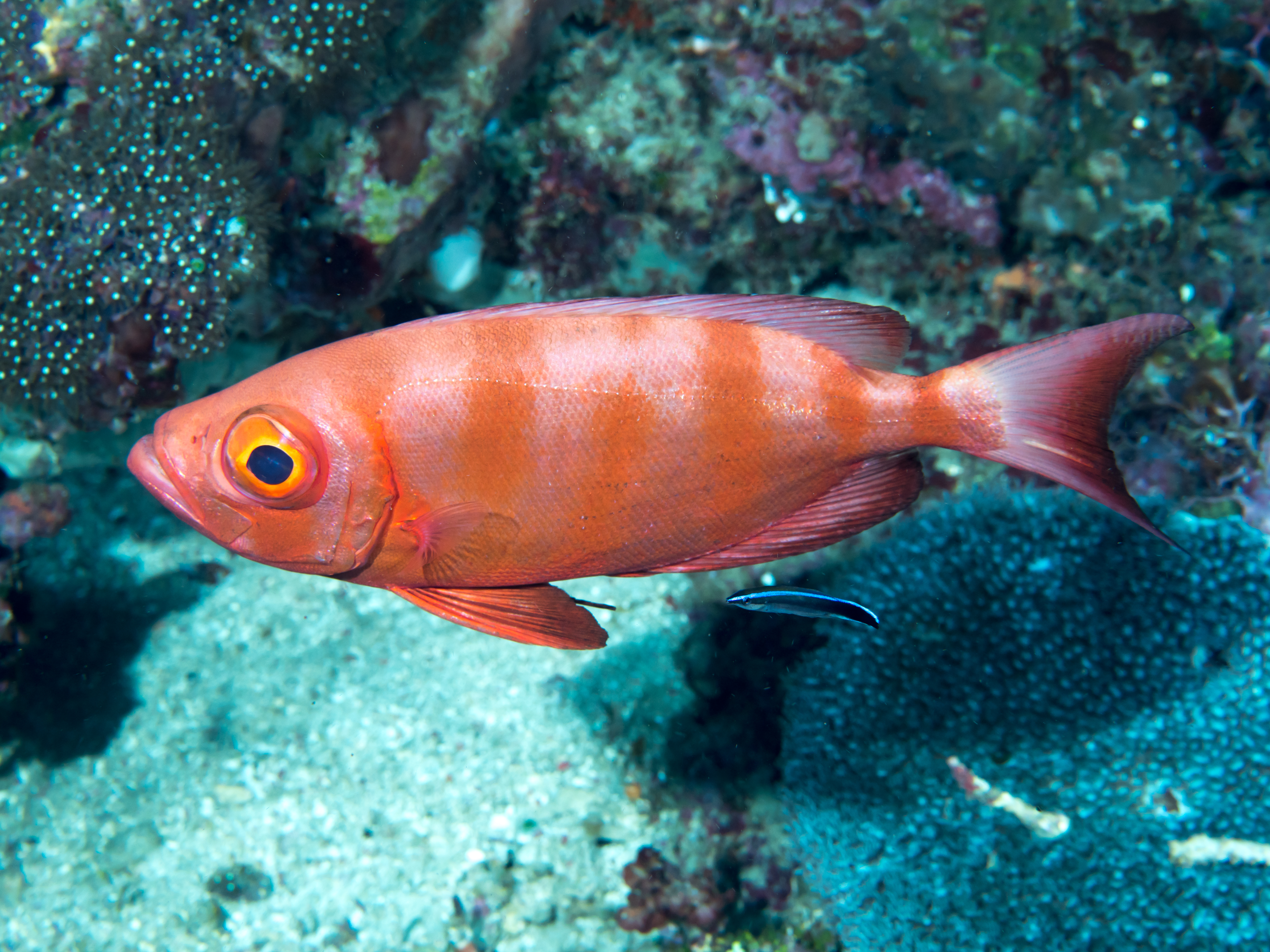
Barred colour phase

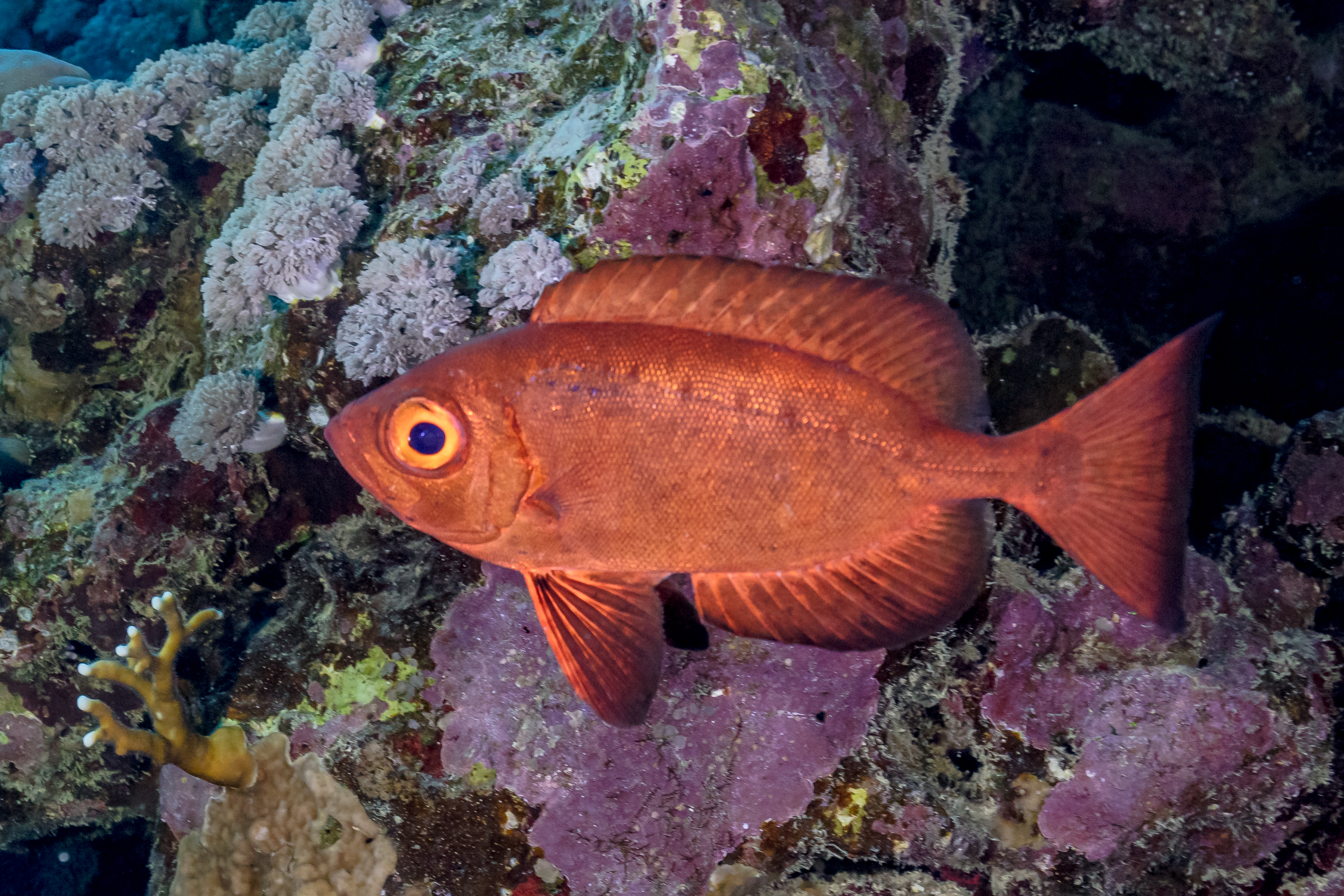
Entirely red phase

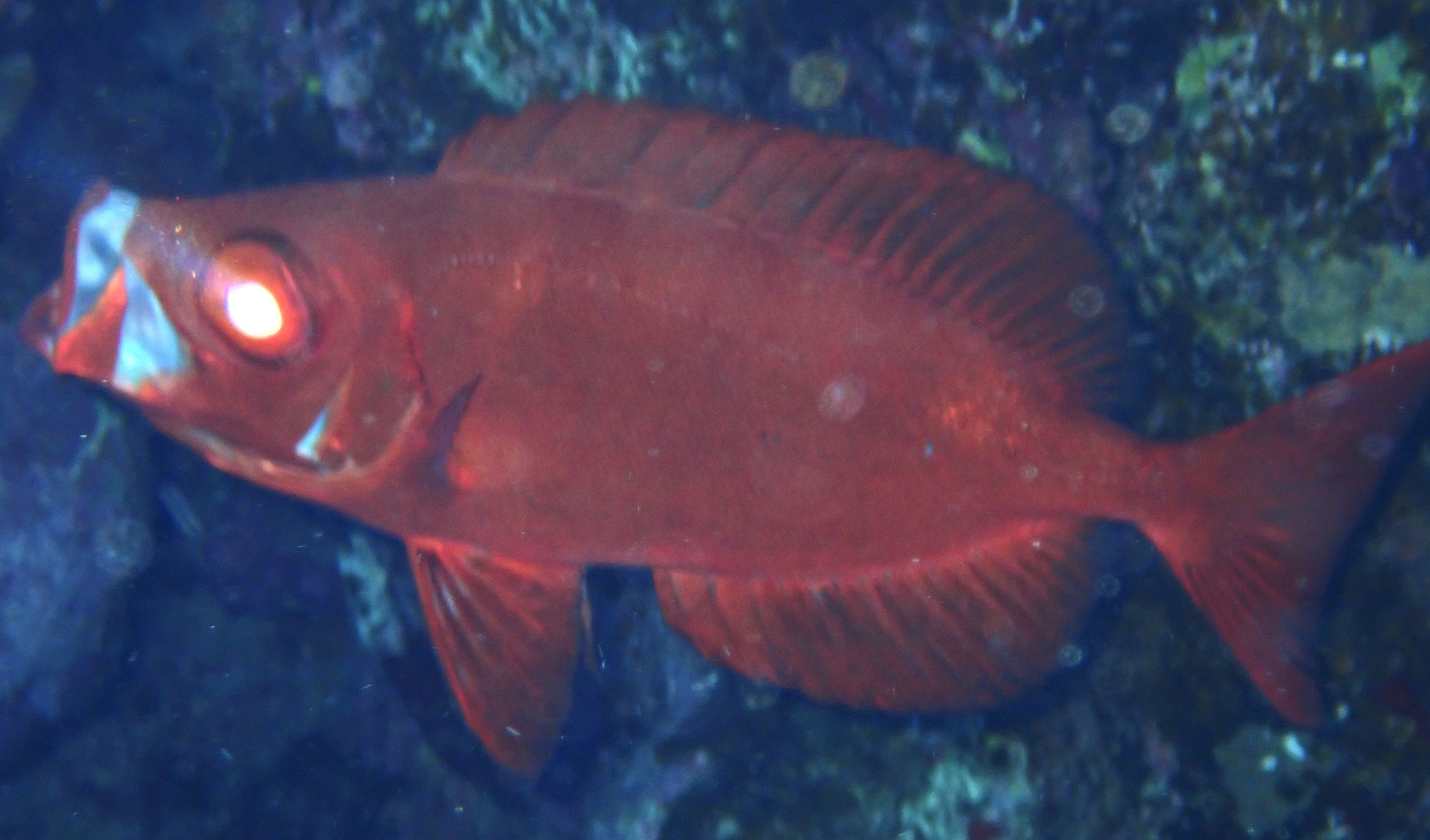
Showing jaw protrusion

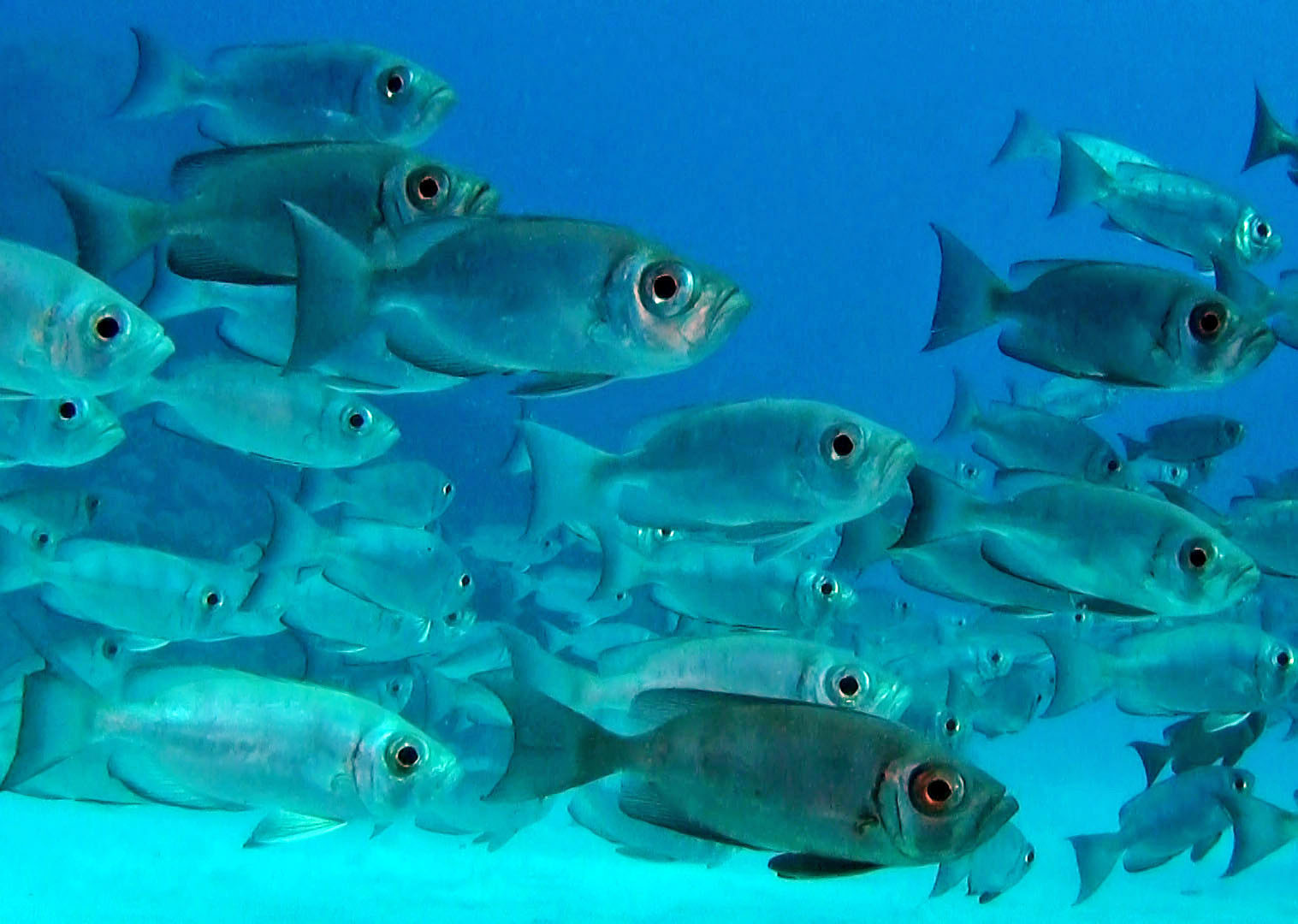
Shoaling

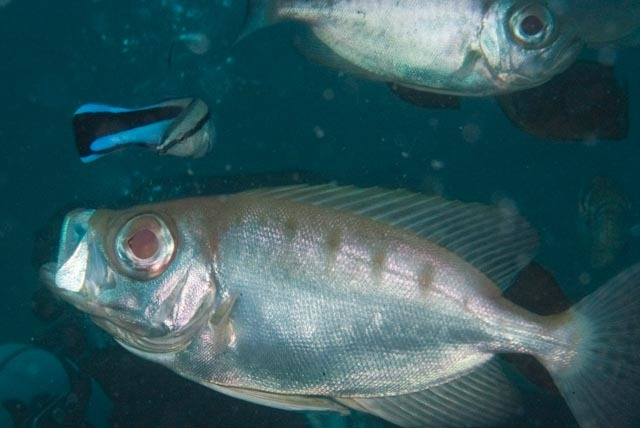
With a bluestreak cleaner wrasse

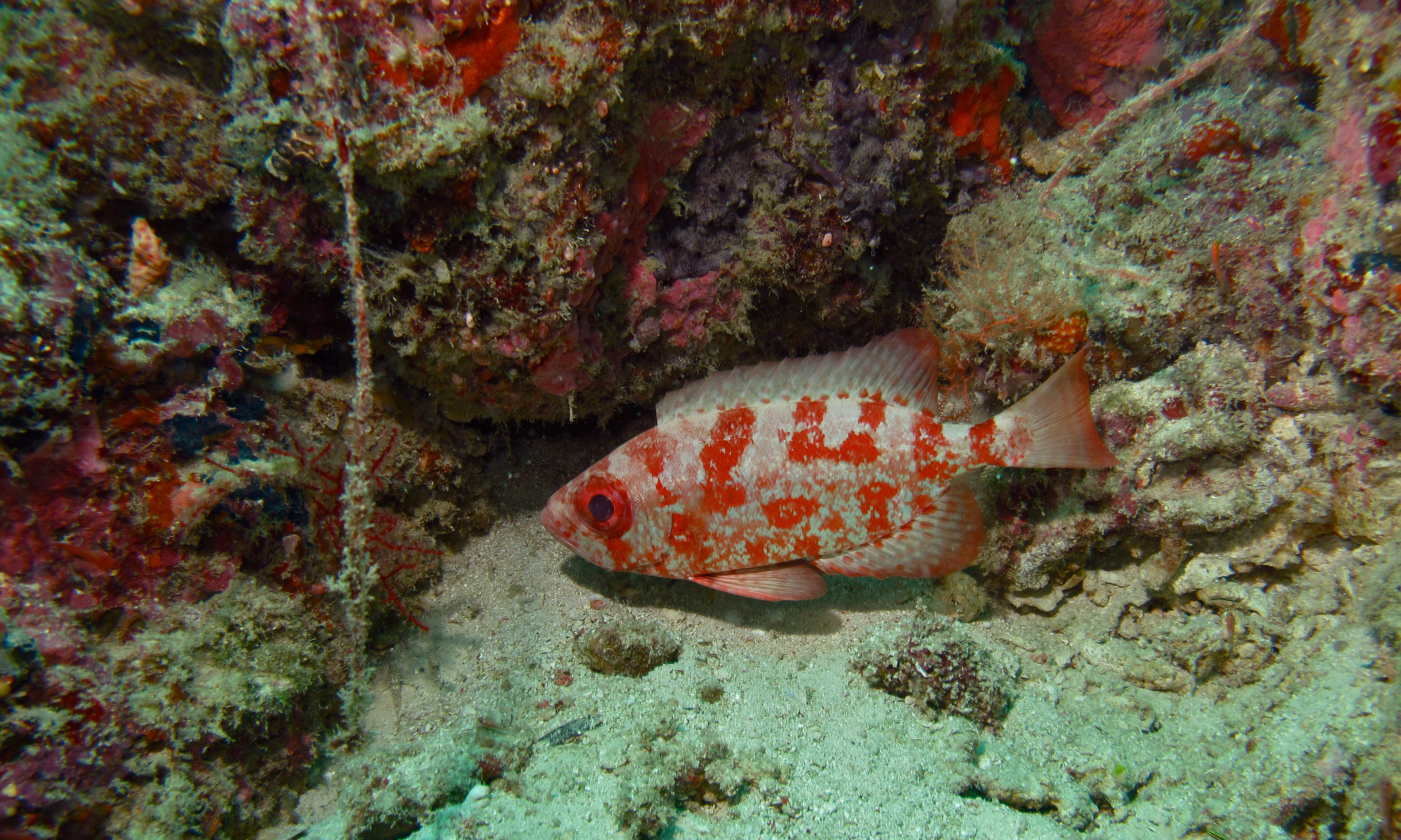
In Malaysia

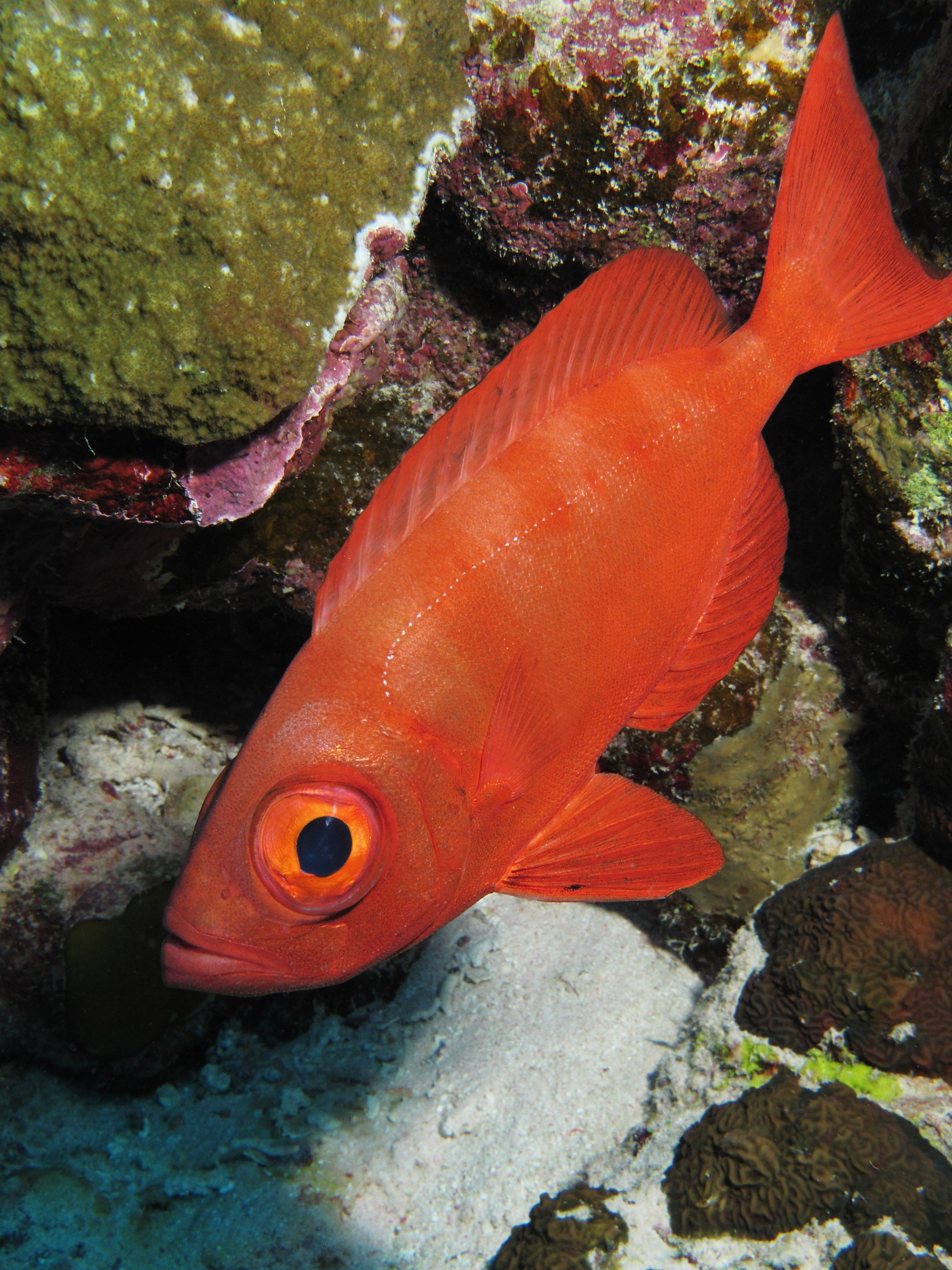
In the Red Sea

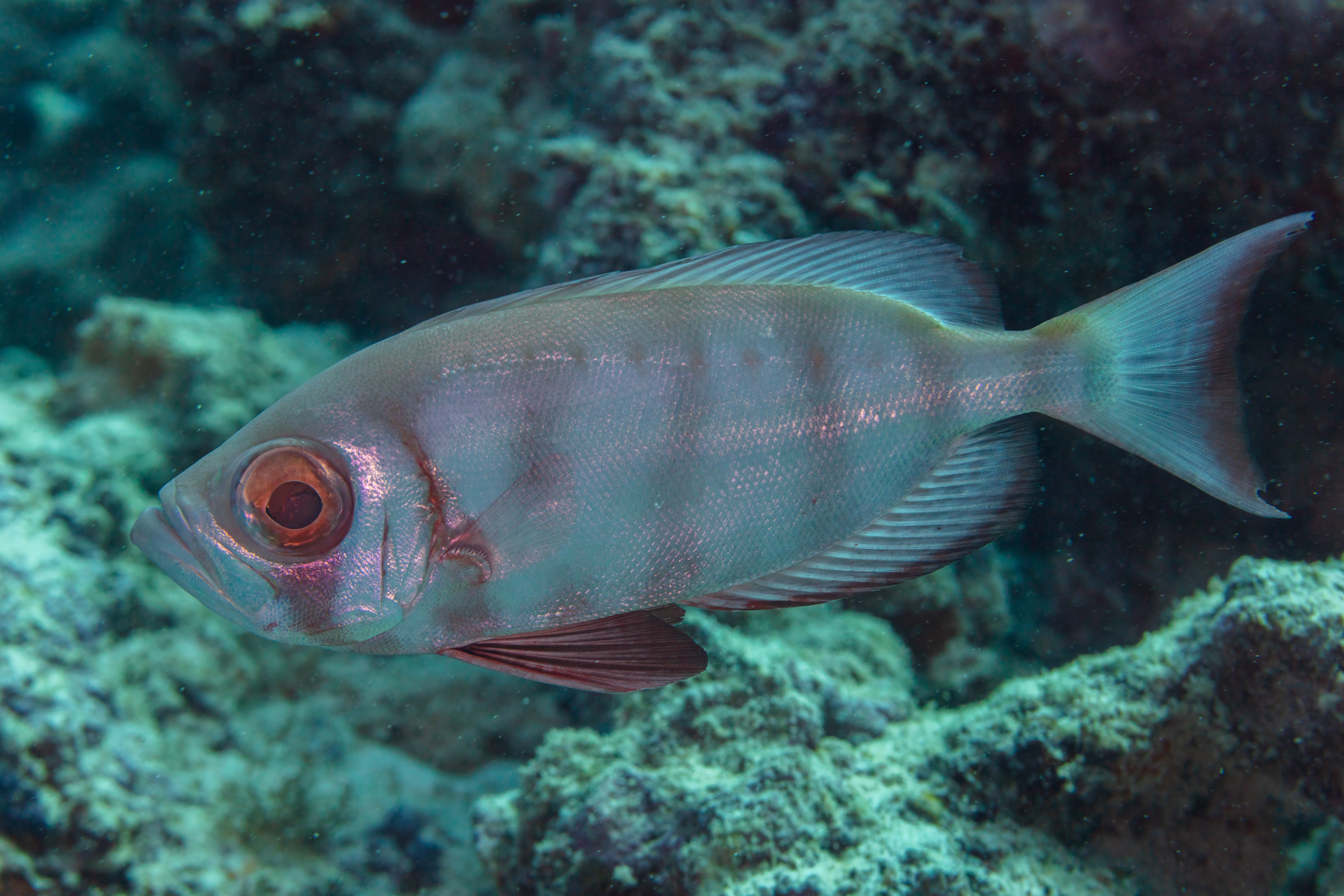
In Tanzania

== Bibliography ==
- Madhusoodana, K. B. and S. Venu. (2006). Length-weight relationship of Priacanthus hamrur (Forsskål) inhabiting the continental slopes beyond 300m depth along the west coast of India. Fishery Technology 43(1).
- Allen, G.R. 1997. Marine Fishes of Tropical Australia and South-east Asia. Western Australian Museum. Pp. 292.
- Fricke, R. (1999) Fishes of the Mascarene Islands (Réunion, Mauritius, Rodriguez): an annotated checklist, with descriptions of new species., Koeltz Scientific Books, Koenigstein, Theses Zoologicae, Vol. 31:759 p.
- Kuiter, R.H. 1996. Guide to Sea Fishes of Australia. New Holland. Pp. 433.
- Kuiter, R.H. 2000. Coastal Fishes of South-eastern Australia. Gary Allen. Pp. 437.
- Monkolprasit, S., S. Sontirat, S. Vimollohakarn and T. Songsirikul (1997) Checklist of Fishes in Thailand., Office of Environmental Policy and Planning, Bangkok, Thailand. 353 p.
- Nguyen, N.T. and V.Q. Nguyen (2006) Biodiversity and living resources of the coral reef fishes in Vietnam marine waters., Science and Technology Publishing House, Hanoi.
- Paxton, J.R., D.F. Hoese, G.R. Allen and J.E. Hanley (1989) Pisces. Petromyzontidae to Carangidae., Zoological Catalogue of Australia, Vol. 7. Australian Government Publishing Service, Canberra, 665 p.
- Randall, J.E., Allen, G.R. & R.C. Sateen. 1997. Fishes of the Great Barrier Reef and Coral Sea. Crawford House Press. Pp. 557.
- Starnes, W.C., 1988. Revision, phylogeny and biogeographic comments on the circumtropical marine percoid fish family Priacanthidae. Bull. Mar. Sci. 43(2):117-203.
