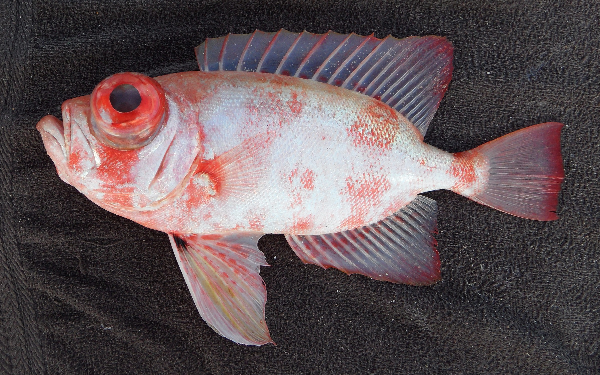

Conservation status
- Least Concern (IUCN 3.1)

Scientific classification
- Kingdom: Animalia
- Phylum: Chordata
- Class: Actinopterygii
- Order: Acanthuriformes
- Family: Priacanthidae
- Genus: Priacanthus
- Species: P. sagittarius

Binomial name
- Priacanthus sagittarius Starnes, 1988

= Priacanthus sagittarius =

Species of ray-finned fish

Priacanthus sagittarius, The arrow bulleye, is a species of marine ray finned fish, a bigeye in the family Priacanthidae. It is native to the Indian and Pacific Oceans. It is also observed since 2009, in rare occasions, in the eastern Mediterranean Sea, which it most likely entered via the Suez Canal.
