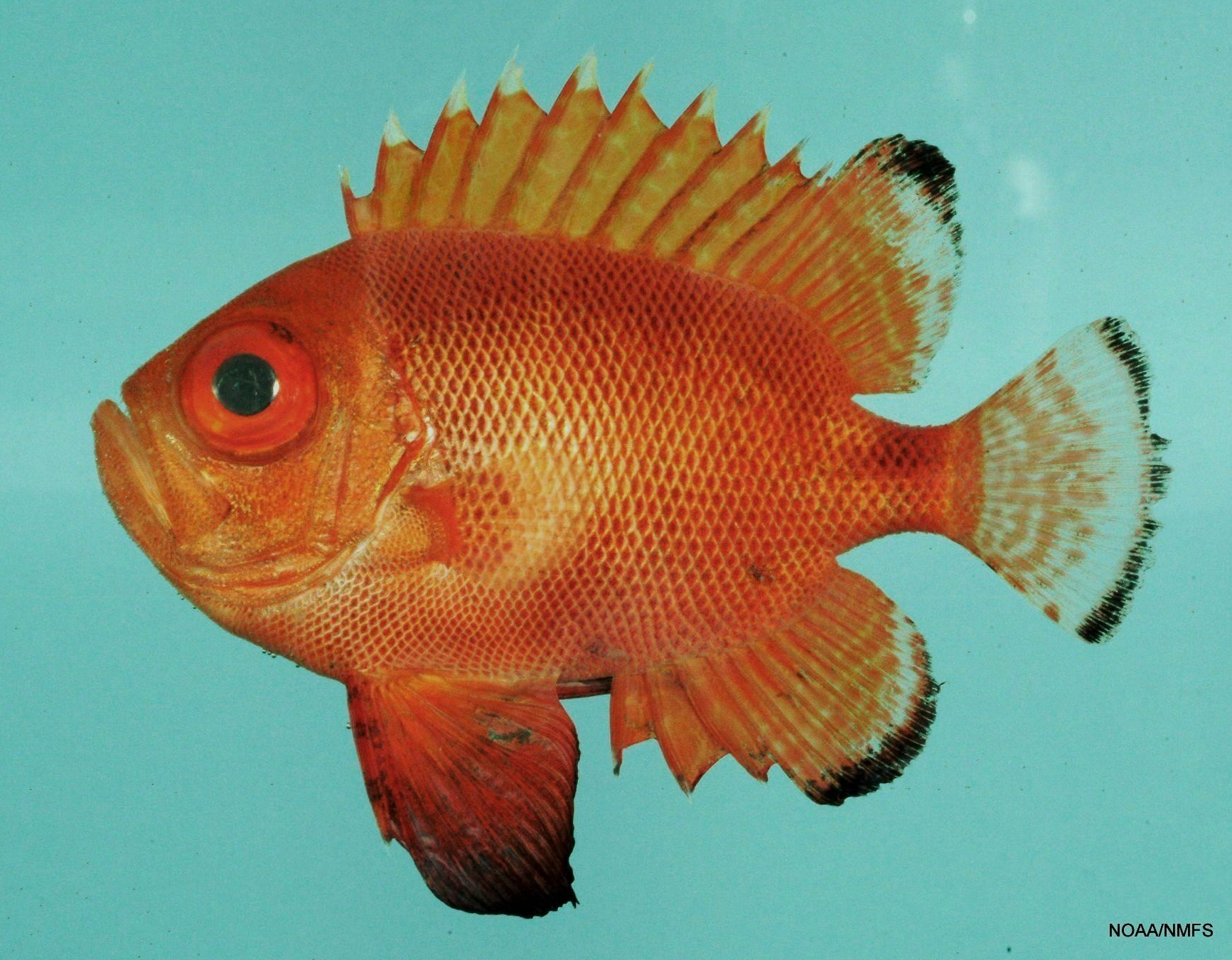

Conservation status
- Least Concern (IUCN 3.1)

Scientific classification
- Kingdom: Animalia
- Phylum: Chordata
- Class: Actinopterygii
- Order: Acanthuriformes
- Family: Priacanthidae
- Genus: Pristigenys
- Species: P. alta

Binomial name
- Pristigenys alta (Gill, 1862)

Synonyms
- Priacanthus altus Gill, 1862; Pseudopriacanthus altus (Gill, 1862)

= Pristigenys alta =

Species of ray-finned fish

Pristigenys alta, the toro or short bigeye, is a species of fish in the family Priacanthidae. Some anglers refer to this fish as "toro snapper", but it is not a snapper, and only distantly related to the fish of the snapper family.

== Description ==
The most noticeable characteristic of Pristigenys alta is its very large eyes. This species is blunt, bright red, and ovate, with a flattened, disk-like body. It is commonly about 20 cm long, but can grow to a maximum length of 30 cm. It has rough scales, and large ventral fins.

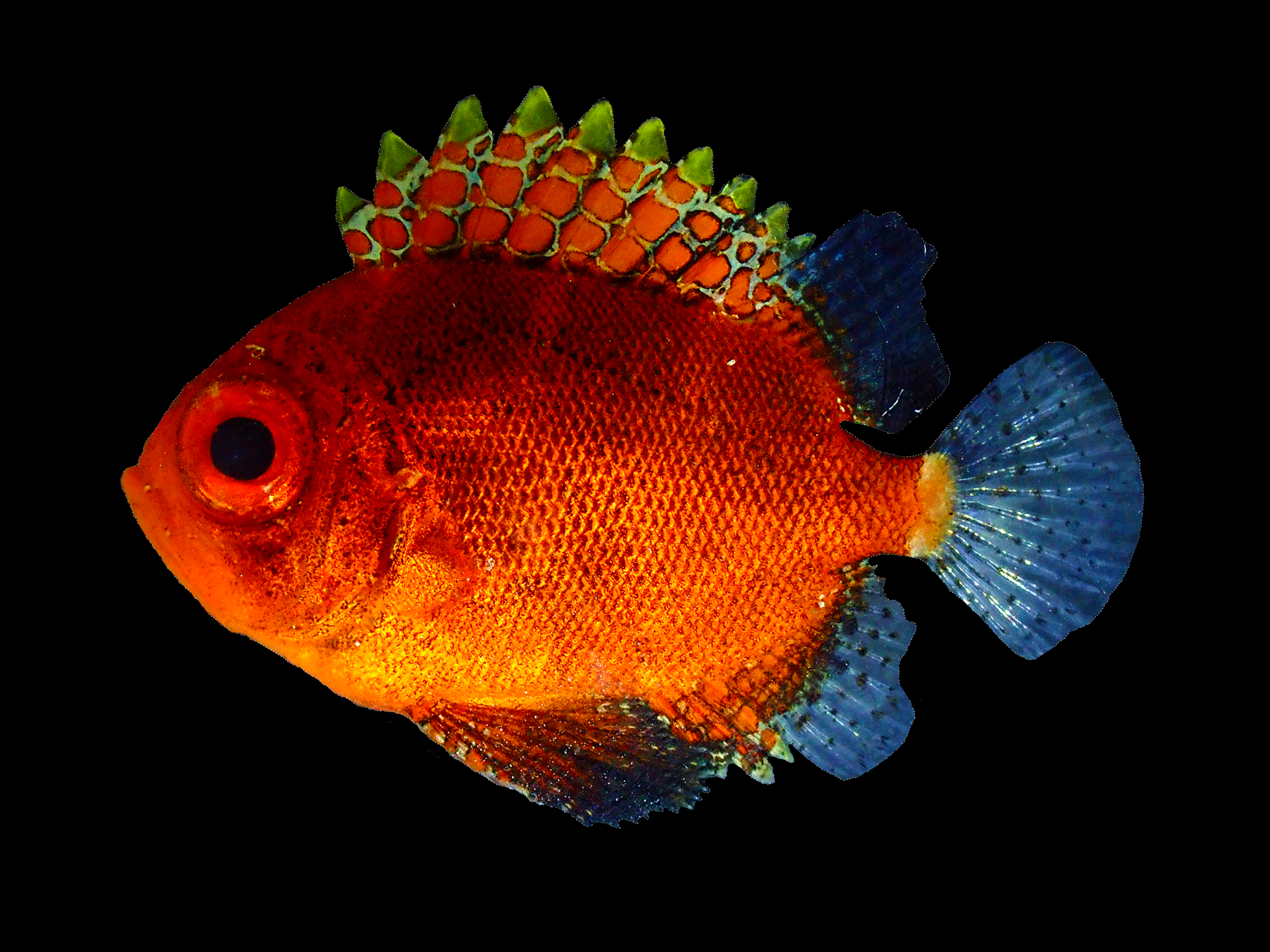
Juvenile

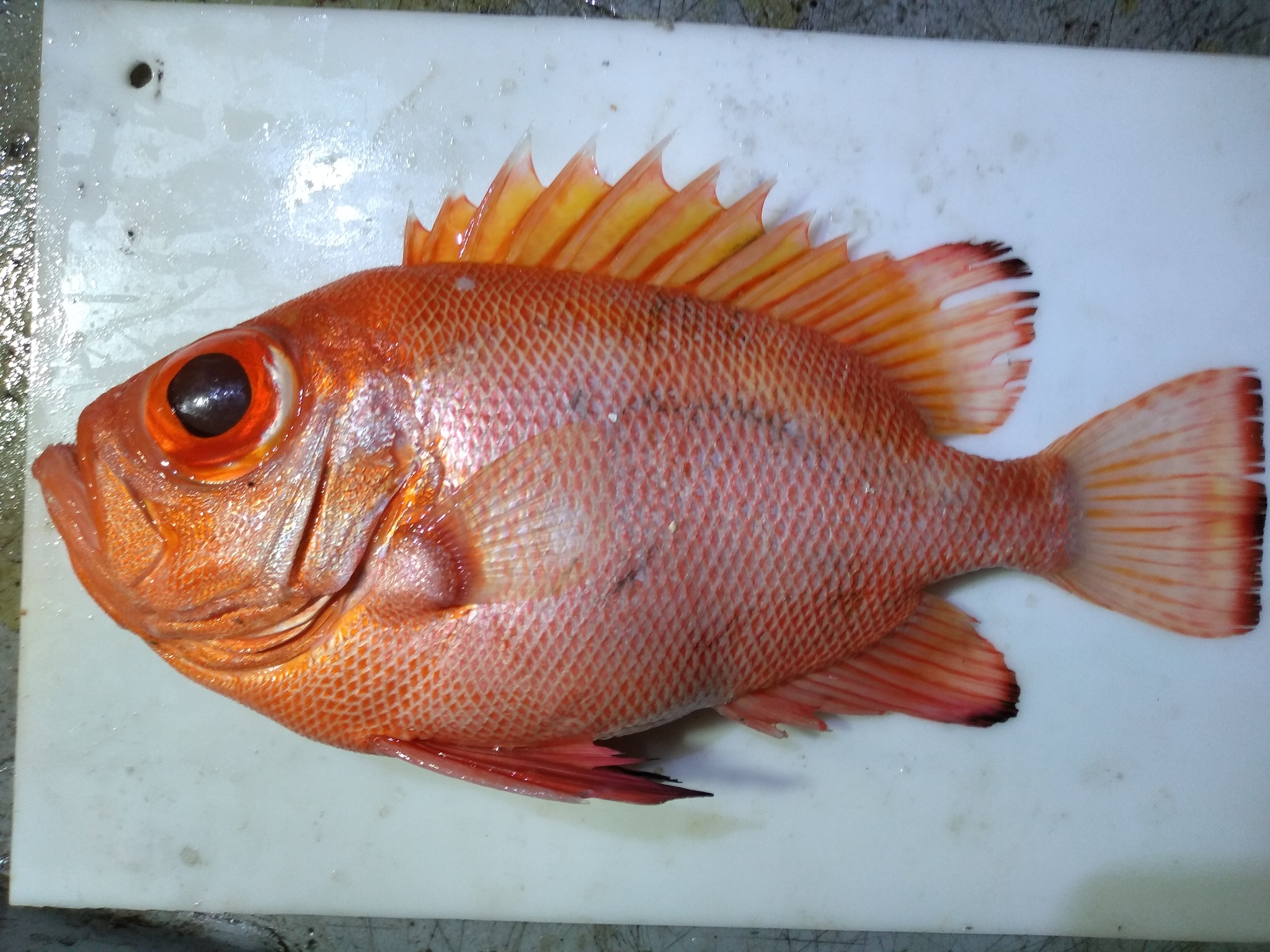
Adult

== Distribution ==
This species is found in the Western Atlantic along the east coast of North America from North Carolina southwards, the Gulf of Mexico, in the Caribbean Sea and West Indies.

== Habitat ==
Pristigenys alta is a solitary marine fish that lives mainly in reef areas at depths of between 5 and 200 metres. It can also be found on rocky bottoms.
