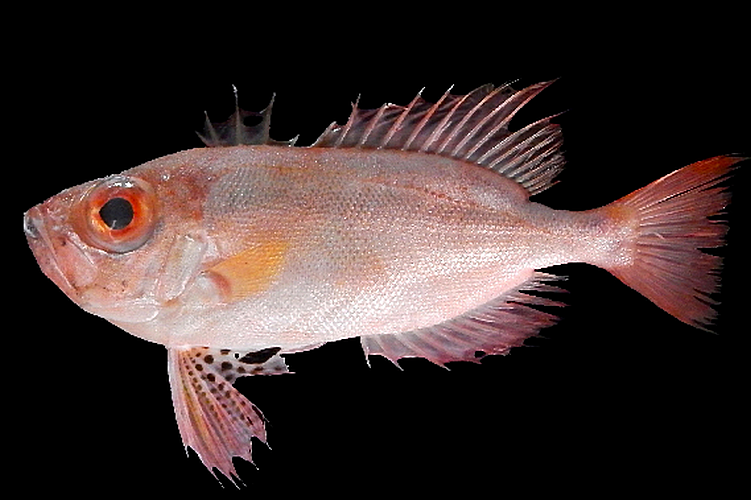

Conservation status
- Least Concern (IUCN 3.1)

Scientific classification
- Kingdom: Animalia
- Phylum: Chordata
- Class: Actinopterygii
- Order: Acanthuriformes
- Family: Priacanthidae
- Genus: Priacanthus
- Species: P. tayenus

Binomial name
- Priacanthus tayenus Richardson, 1846

Synonyms
- Priacanthus holocentrum Bleeker, 1849; Priacanthus schmittii Bleeker, 1852

= Priacanthus tayenus =

Species of ray-finned fish

Priacanthus tayenus, commonly known as purple-spotted bigeye, is a species of marine ray finned fish, a bigeye in the family Priacanthidae. It is native to the Indian and Pacific Oceans.
