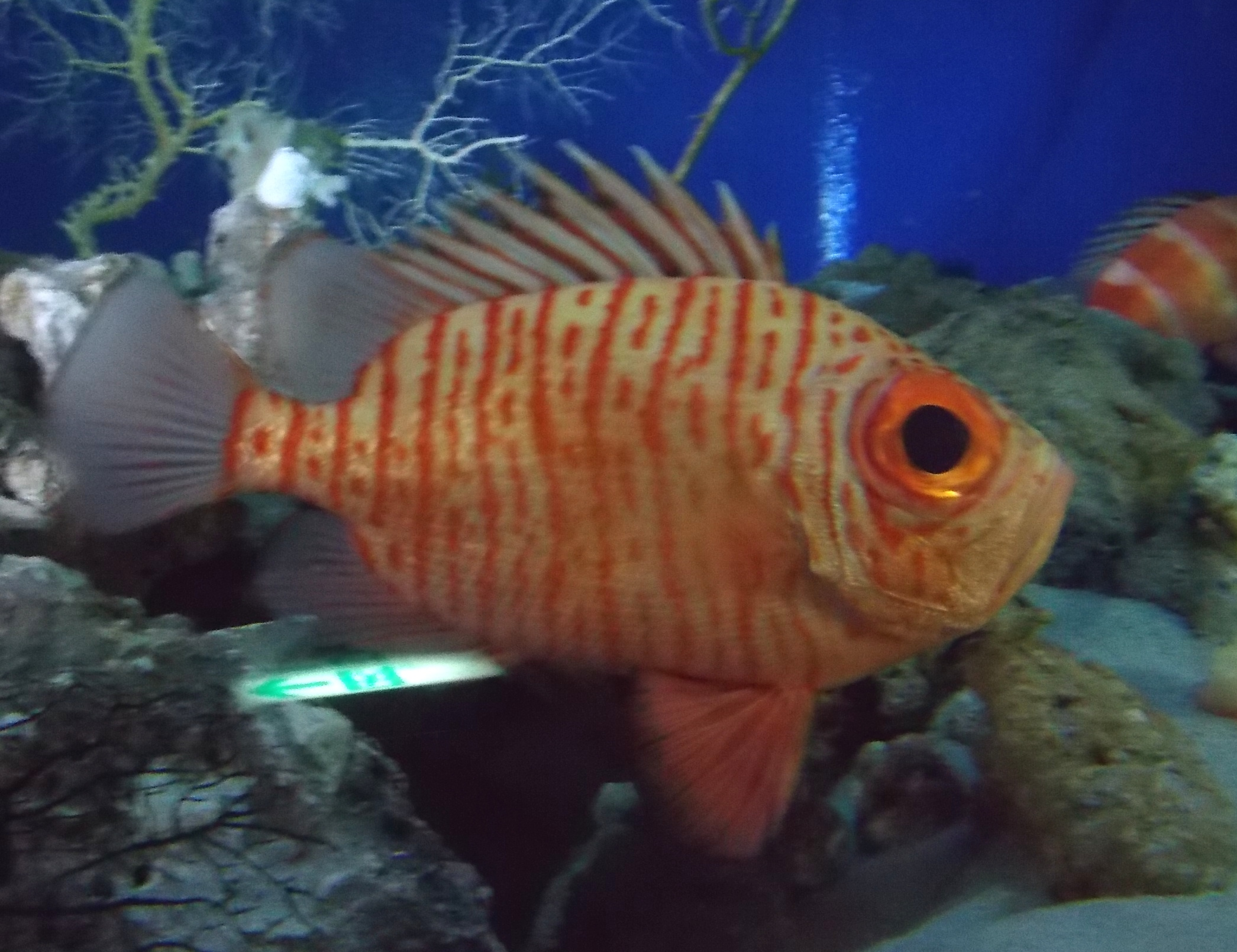

Conservation status
- Least Concern (IUCN 3.1)

Scientific classification
- Kingdom: Animalia
- Phylum: Chordata
- Class: Actinopterygii
- Order: Acanthuriformes
- Family: Priacanthidae
- Genus: Pristigenys
- Species: P. niphonia

Binomial name
- Pristigenys niphonia (Cuvier, 1829)

Synonyms
- Priacanthus niphonius Cuvier, 1829; Pseudopriacanthus niphonia (Cuvier, 1829); Pseudopriacanthus niphonius (Cuvier, 1829); Polyprion japonicus Langsdorf, 1829

= Pristigenys niphonia =

Species of ray-finned fish

Pristigenys niphonia, the Japanese bigeye, is a species of marine ray-finned fish in the family Priacanthidae. It occurs in the western Pacific Ocean.

== Distribution ==
The Japanese bigeye is found in the western Pacific. Specifically, it is found in the marine waters around: Japan, the East China Sea Shelf, Taiwan, South China Sea, Vietnam, Celebes, Australia, and Indonesia.
