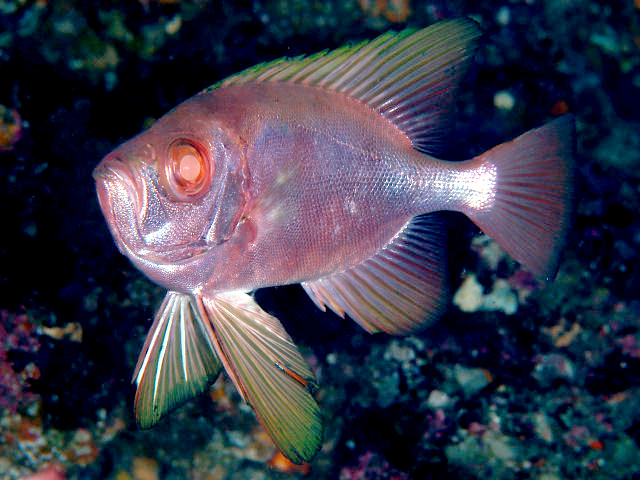

Scientific classification
- Kingdom: Animalia
- Phylum: Chordata
- Class: Actinopterygii
- Division: Teleostei
- Order: Acanthuriformes
- Family: Priacanthidae
- Genus: Cookeolus
- Species: C. japonicus

Binomial name
- Cookeolus japonicus (Cuvier, 1829)

Synonyms
- Priacanthus japonicus Cuvier, 1829

= Cookeolus japonicus =

Species of fish

Cookeolus japonicus is a species of fish in the family Priacanthidae, the bigeyes and catalufas. It is the only extant species of Cookeolus, except for C. spinolacrymatus, an extinct Late Pliocene fish known from a fossil specimen collected in Okinawa, Japan.

C. japonicus is found throughout the tropical and subtropical oceans, except the East Atlantic. In the Indo-Pacific its distribution extends from South Africa to Japan to Australia, in the eastern Pacific from Mexico to Peru, in the West Atlantic from Canada to Argentina, and at Saint Helena in the South Atlantic. Common names for the fish include longfinned bullseye, deepwater bullseye, big-fin bigeye (English), buloog (Afrikaans), deek (Arabic), baga-baga (Cebuano), bukaw-bukaw (Hiligaynon), siga (Tagalog), beauclaire longue aile (French), chikame-kintoki (Japanese), bbuldom (Korean), fura-vasos alfonsim (Mozambican Portuguese), and catalufa aleta larga (Spanish).

== Description ==
This species reaches up to 69 cm (27 in) long, but is more often around 30 cm (12 in). Specimens weighing 5 kg (11 lb) have been noted. Fish of this family are known for their thick scales and large eyes, which take up about half the length of the head. This species is the largest in the Priacanthidae. It can also be distinguished from others in the family by its long pelvic fins. These are longest, relative to body size, in smaller individuals. The tail fin is rounded. The fish has an elongated oval shape as an adult and is laterally compressed. It is red in color, and all the fins may be yellowish except the pectorals, which are pink to colorless. The membranes between the dorsal spines may be slightly darkened to totally black, and the long pelvic fins may be quite dark. The juvenile is not well known but it is likely silver in color. The appearance of the fish shows some geographical variation, mainly in size.

The life span of the fish is up to about 9 years.

== Ecology ==
Many catalufas commonly live in the waters around islands. This species lives around reefs at depths up to 400 m (1,300 ft), though it is usually found between 165 and 200 m (541 and 656 ft). It lives around rocks and ledges with invertebrate life such as sponges and corals.

Its diet includes pelagic crustaceans, especially crabs.

Predators of the fish include yellowfin tuna (Thunnus albacares).

This fish is parasitized by the copepods Parashiinoa cookeola and Caligus cookeoli.
