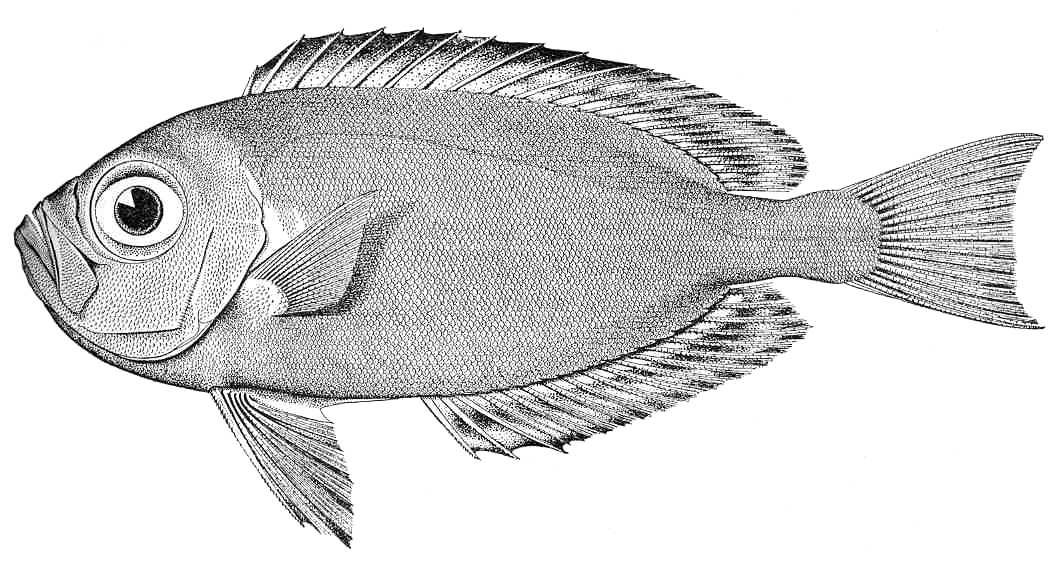

Conservation status
- Least Concern (IUCN 3.1)

Scientific classification
- Kingdom: Animalia
- Phylum: Chordata
- Class: Actinopterygii
- Order: Acanthuriformes
- Family: Priacanthidae
- Genus: Priacanthus
- Species: P. meeki

Binomial name
- Priacanthus meeki O. P. Jenkins, 1903

Synonyms
- Priacanthus helvolus Jordan, Evermann & Tanaka, 1927

= Priacanthus meeki =

Species of ray-finned fish

Priacanthus meeki is a species of marine ray finned fish, a bigeye in the family Priacanthidae. It is a red fish found in the Hawaiian and Midway Islands. It grows to a size of 33 cm in length. Common names are Hawaiian bigeye in English and ula lau au in the Hawaiian language. It, and other species of its family, may also be called ʻāweoweo in Hawaii.

Its specific name honors the American ichthyologist Seth Eugene Meek (1859-1914).

== Description ==
The Hawaiian Bigeye is a red ray finned fish that gets its name from its noticeable feature, Its big eyes. The body outline is slightly elongated, the forehead and trailing edge of the tail is slightly concave, and the soft fin rays lack spots. Fishermen would often use flashlights to spot them due to the Hawaiian Bigeye having very reflective eyes making them easy to find at night.

== Etymology ==
The fish is named in honor of ichthyologist Seth Eugene Meek.

== Distribution and habitat ==
Priacanthus meeki can be found in the Eastern Pacific: Hawaiian and Midway Islands; a single juvenile specimen recorded from the Galapagos Islands. Strays can reach Johnston Atoll (Ref. 9710). There were also reports from Japan but are probably misidentifications of Priacanthus hamrur. 'Āweoweo are often found in caves and under ledges during the day at around 3 to 230 m in depth. The sand lances occur over sandy habitats.

== Human use and cultural significance ==
The cultural significance of the Hawaiian Bigeye is that the Hawaiian name 'āweoweo has more than one meaning. In Hawaiian culture, dualism is an important aspect. An example of one such dualism can be found in comparing the plant and fish who share the common name ʻāweoweo. The meaning of this name can be deciphered by breaking apart the words that comprise the name: ʻā refers to "burning fire" and weo, which is reduplicated, refers to "red" or "redness" and the plant is said to have a fishy smell.

Traditional Hawaiian culture holds that the appearance of large schools of red fish - often 'āweoweo or their juvenile form, known in Hawaii as alalaua - foretells the imminent death of an ali'i or member of the Hawaiian royal family. Great numbers of them were reported in bays and harbors across the Islands in the months leading up to the death of Queen Lili'uokalani on November 11, 1917.

The āweoweo is mostly fished recreationally by many. The method to catch some āweoweo is to wait till sunset due to them being mostly active at night, then use a hook and line with squid, shrimp, and glowing grubs as the bait.
