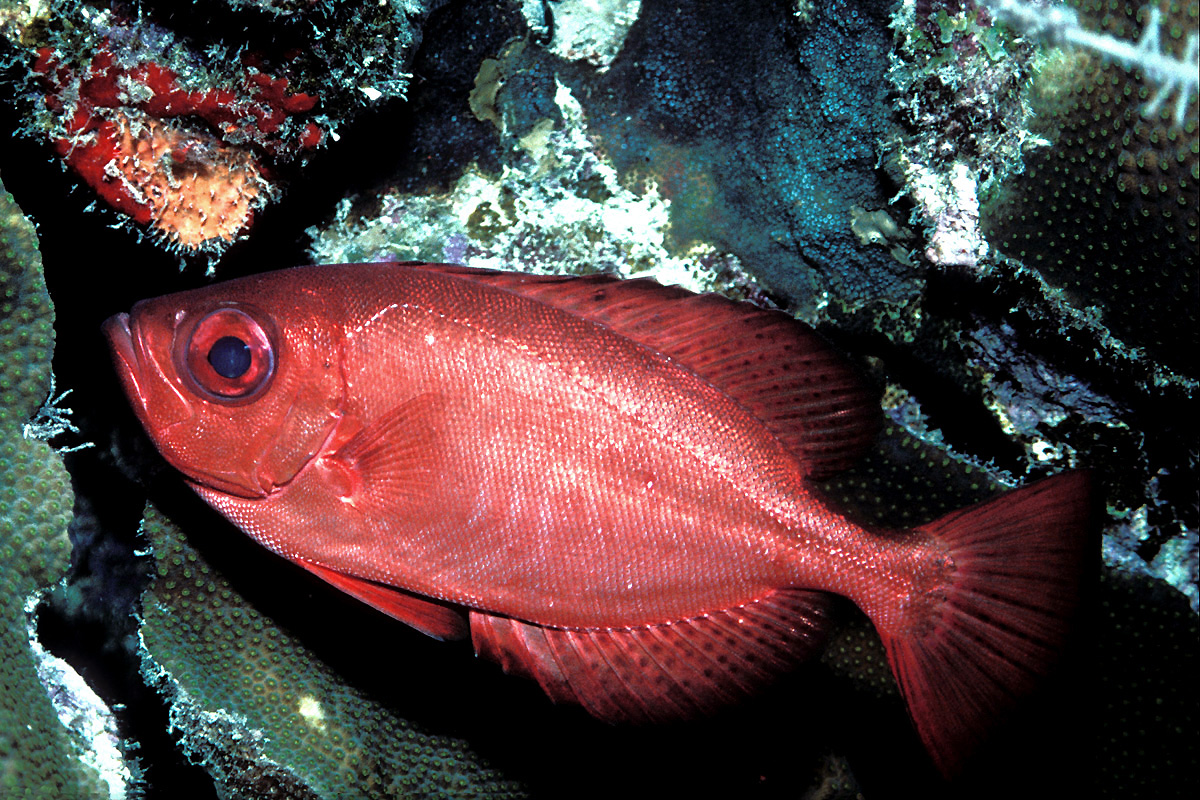
- Glasseye, Heteropriacanthus cruentatus

Scientific classification
- Kingdom: Animalia
- Phylum: Chordata
- Class: Actinopterygii
- Division: Teleostei
- Order: Acanthuriformes
- Family: Priacanthidae; Günther, 1859

Genera
- see text

= Priacanthidae =

Bigeyes

Family of fishes

The Priacanthidae, the bigeyes, are a family of 18 species of marine ray-finned fishes. "Catalufa" is an alternate common name for some members of the Priacanthidae. The etymology of the scientific name (prioo-, to bite + akantha, thorn) refers to the family's very rough, spined scales. The common name of "bigeye" refers to the member species' unusually large eyes, suited to their carnivorous and nocturnal lifestyles. Priacanthidae are typically colored bright red, but some have patterns in silver, dusky brown, or black. Most species reach a maximum total length of about 30 cm (12 in), although in a few species lengths of over 50 cm (20 in) are known.

Most members of this family are native to tropical and subtropical parts of the Indian and Pacific Oceans, but four species (Cookeolus japonicus, Heteropriacanthus cruentatus, Priacanthus arenatus, and Pristigenys alta) are found in the Atlantic. They tend to live near rock outcroppings or reefs, although a few are known to inhabit open waters. Many species are found in relatively deep waters, below depths reachable by normal scuba diving. Some species are fished for food.

The earliest identified Priacanthidae fossils date to the middle Eocene epoch of the lower Tertiary period, or roughly 40 to 50 million years ago.

== Species ==
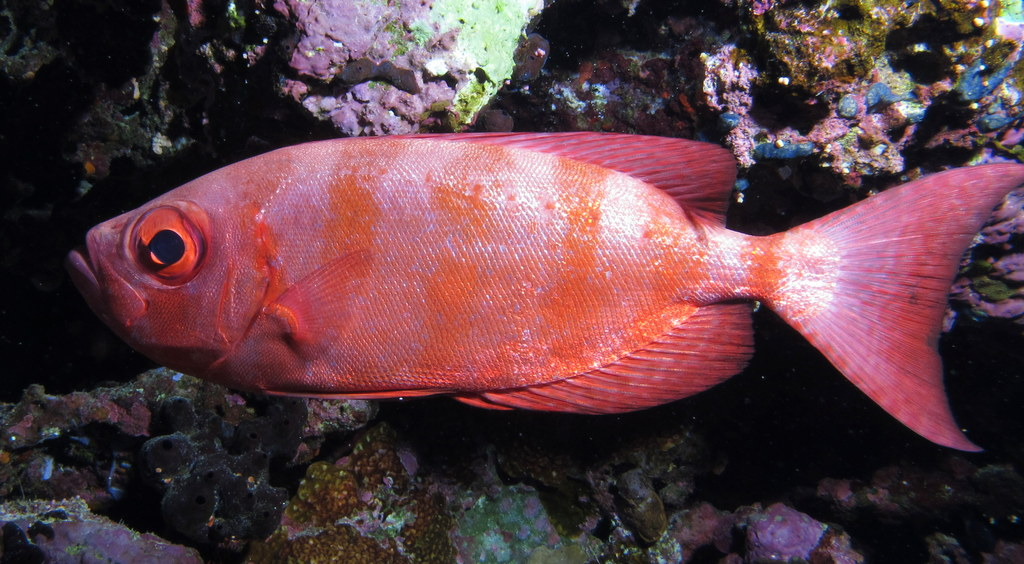
Moontail bullseye, Priacanthus hamrur

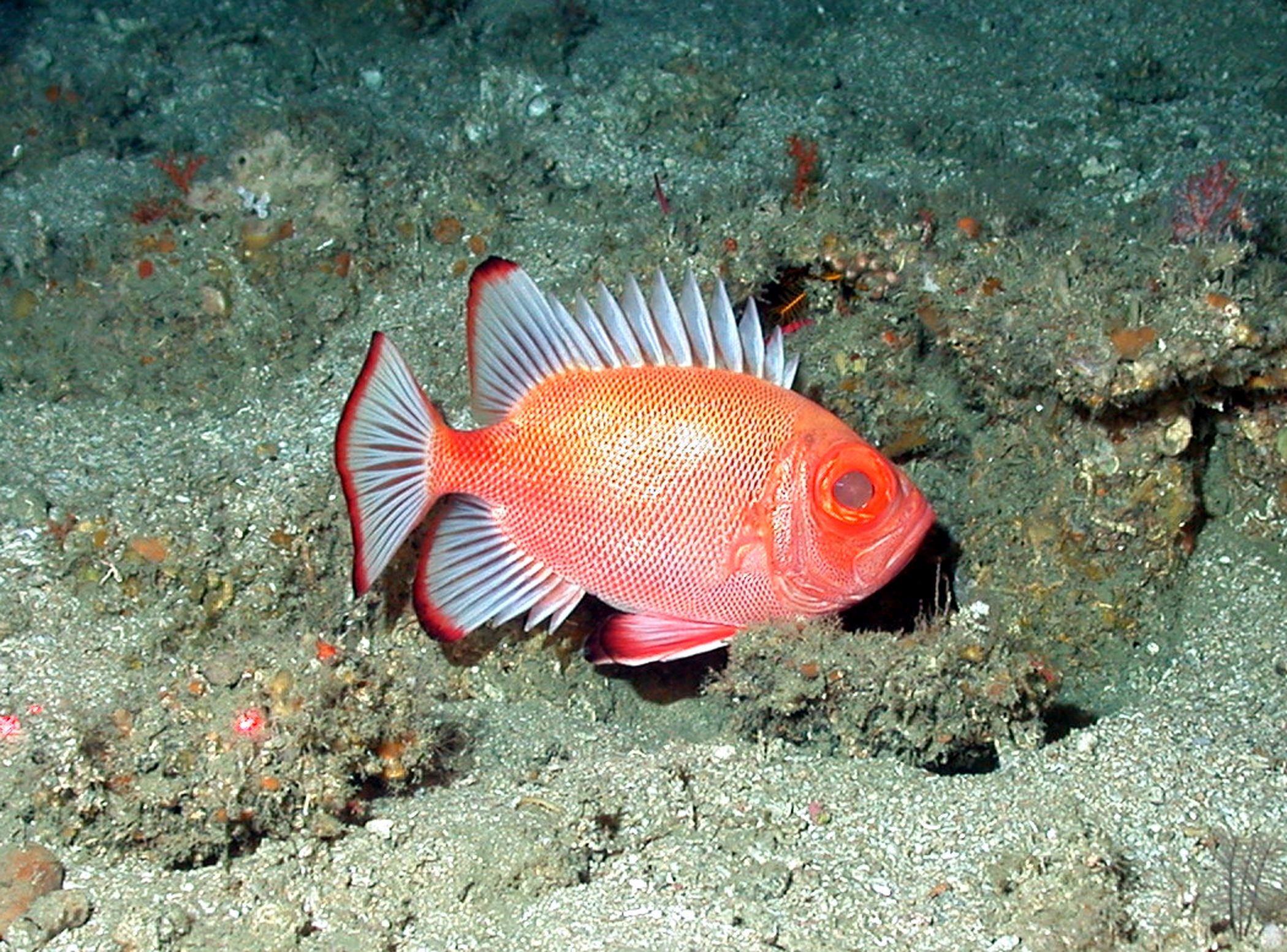
Short bigeye, Pristigenys alta

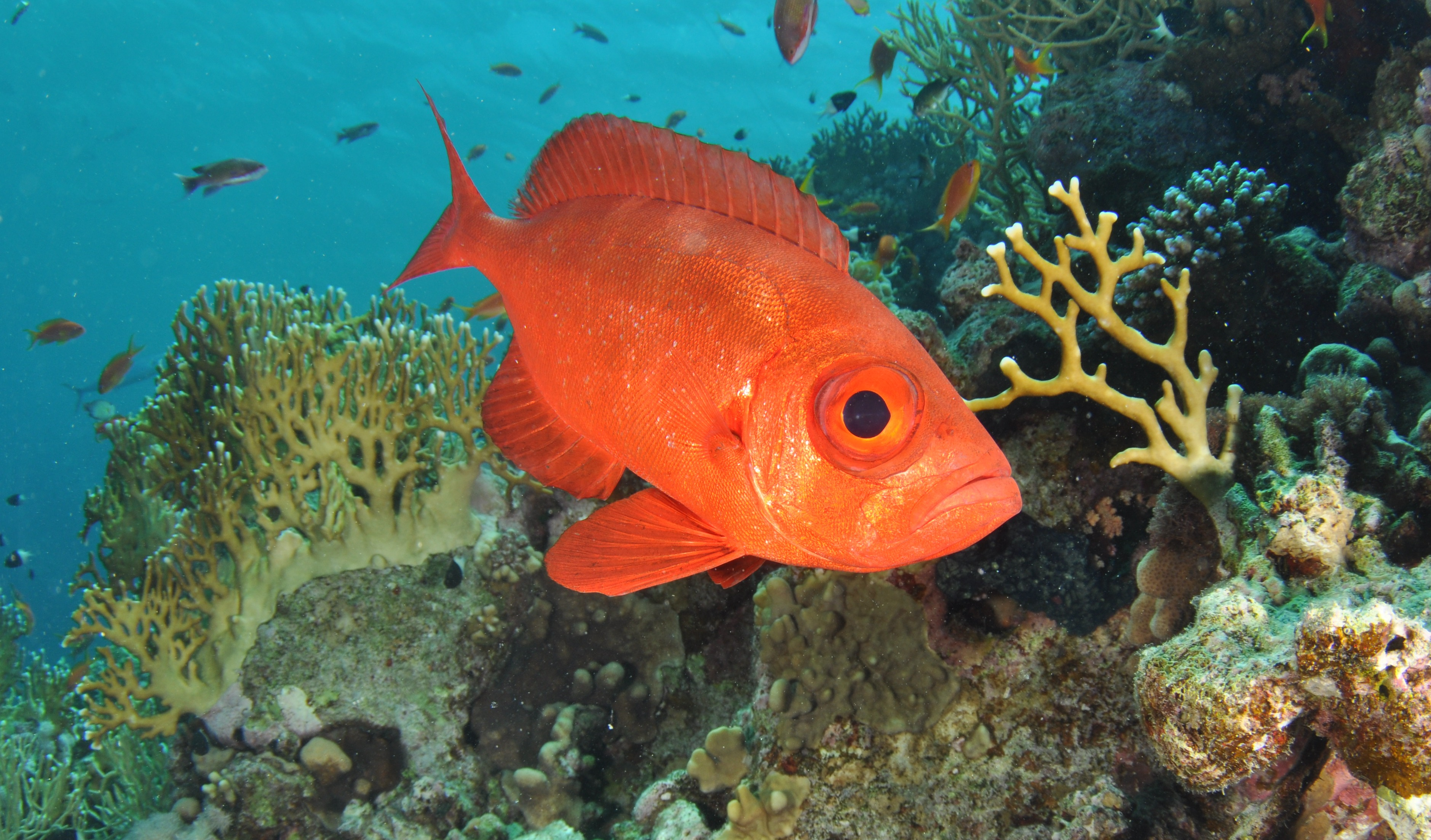
Paeony bulleye (Priacanthus blochii) from the Red Sea

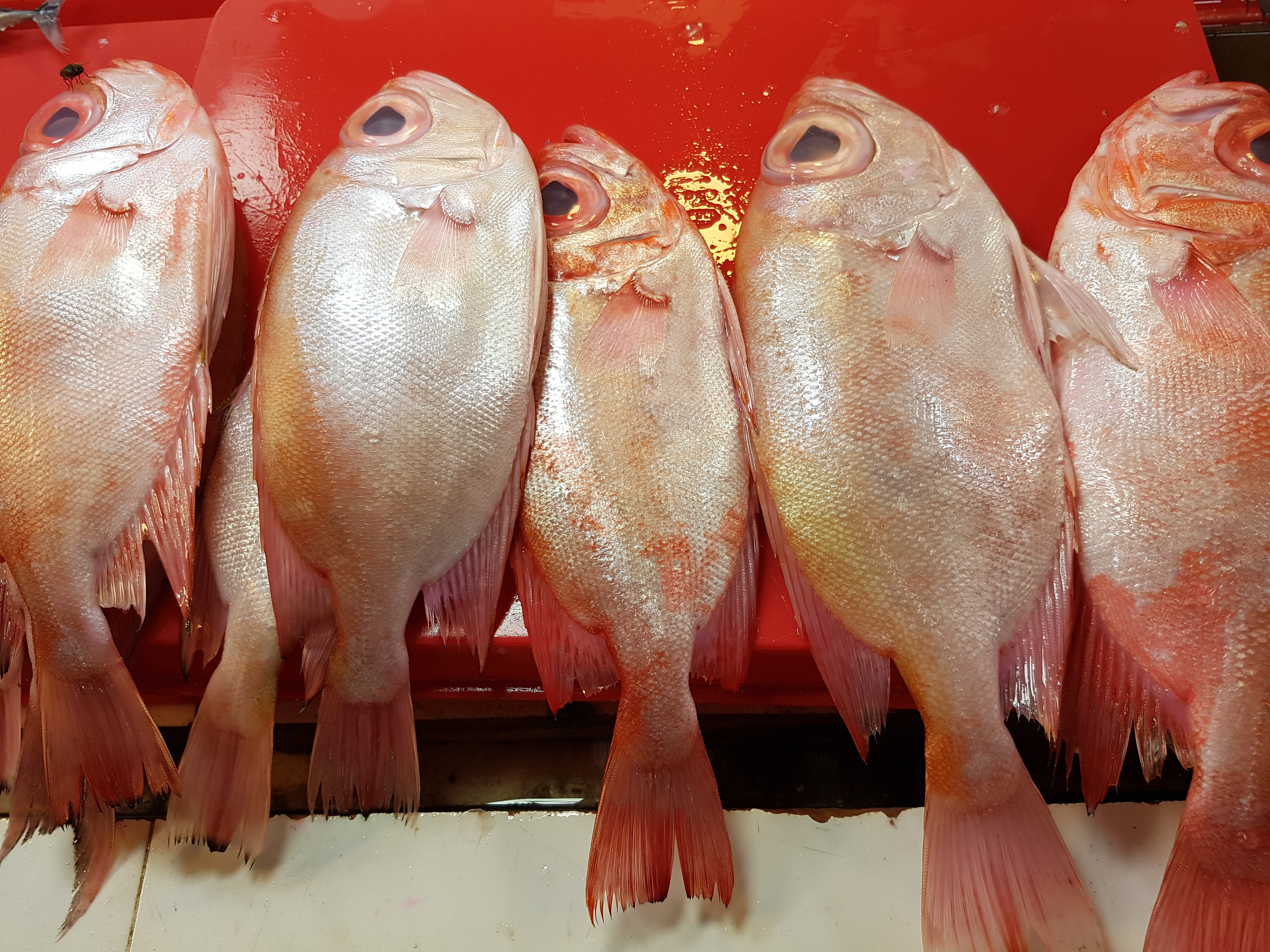
Red bigeye (Priacanthus macracanthus) in a Philippine fish market

The 18 species in four genera are:

- Genus Cookeolus Fowler, 1928
  - Cookeolus japonicus (Cuvier, 1829) - Longfinned bullseye
  - †Cookeolus spinolacrymatus Kon & Yoshino, 1997
- Genus Heteropriacanthus Fitch & Crooke, 1984
  - Heteropriacanthus cruentatus (Lacépède, 1801) - Glasseye
- Genus † Parapristigenys Bannikov & Carnevale, 2026
  - † Parapristigenys marramai Bannikov & Carnevale, 2026
- Genus Priacanthus Oken, 1817
  - Priacanthus alalaua Jordan & Evermann, 1903 - Alalaua
  - Priacanthus arenatus Cuvier, 1829 - Atlantic bigeye
  - Priacanthus blochii Bleeker, 1853 - Paeony bulleye
  - Priacanthus fitchi Starnes, 1988
  - Priacanthus hamrur (Forsskål, 1775) - Moontail bullseye
  - Priacanthus macracanthus Cuvier, 1829 - Red bigeye
  - Priacanthus meeki Jenkins, 1903 - Hawaiian bigeye
  - Priacanthus nasca Starnes, 1988
  - Priacanthus prolixus Starnes, 1988 - Elongate bulleye
  - Priacanthus sagittarius Starnes, 1988 - Arrow bulleye
  - Priacanthus tayenus Richardson, 1846 - Purple-spotted bigeye
  - Priacanthus zaiserae Starnes & Moyer, 1988
  - † Priacanthus liui Tao, 1993
  - † Priacanthus pellegrinoi Bannikov & Carnevale, 2026
- Genus Pristigenys Agassiz 1835
  - Pristigenys alta (Gill, 1862) - Short bigeye
  - Pristigenys meyeri (Günther, 1872)
  - Pristigenys niphonia (Cuvier, 1829) - Japanese bigeye
  - Pristigenys serrula (Gilbert, 1891) - Popeye catalufa
  - †Pristigenys substriatus (Blainville, 1818)
