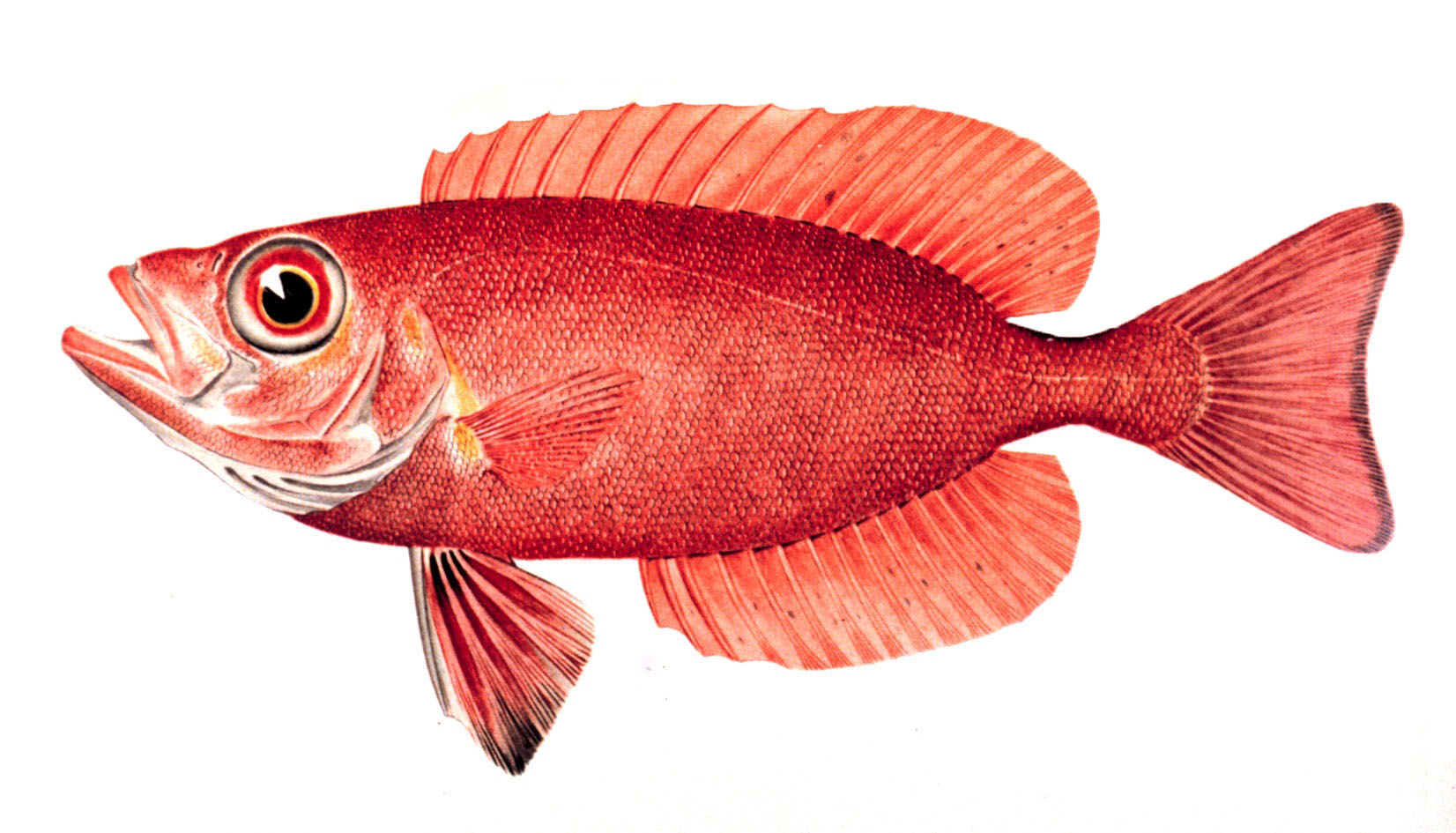

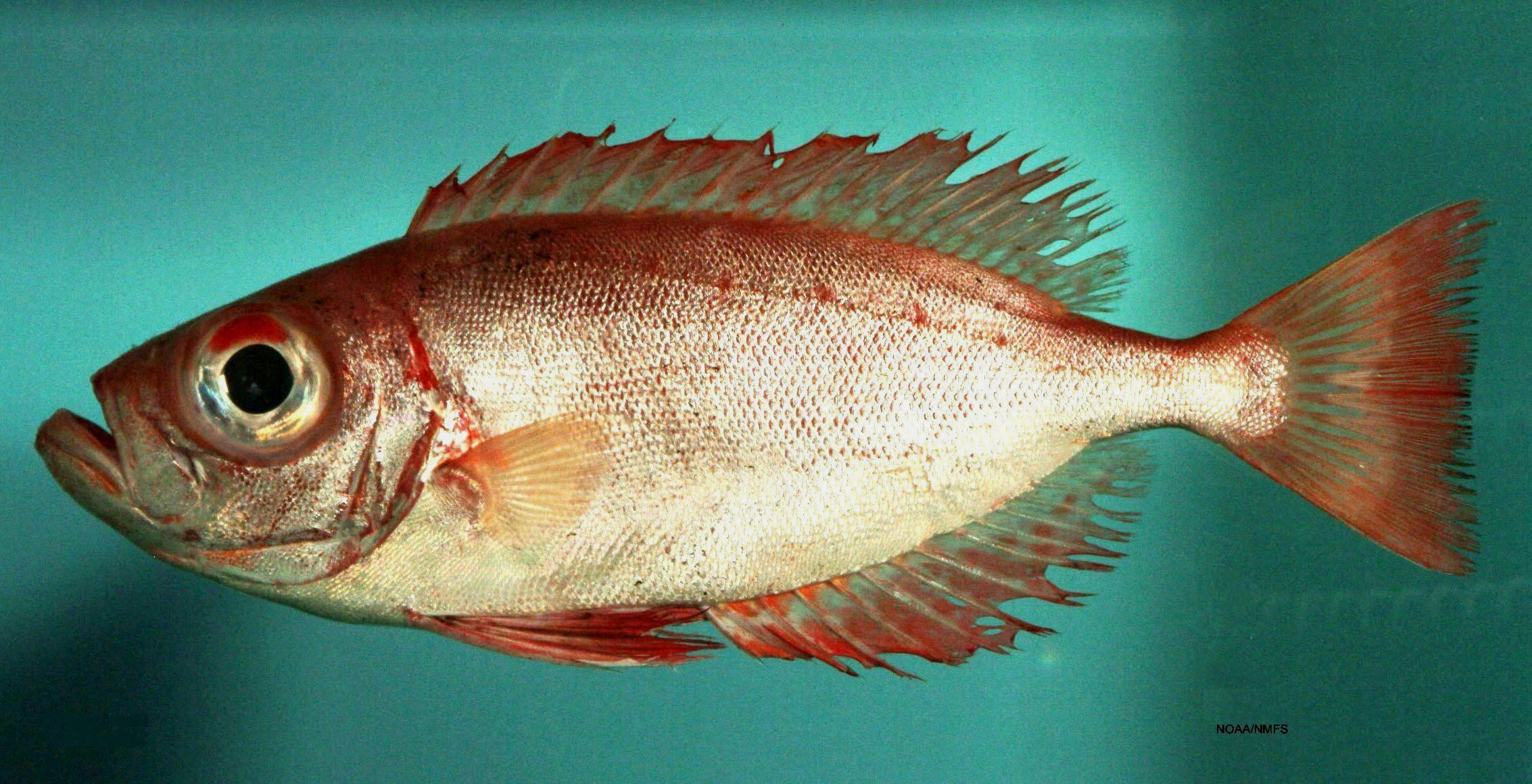

Conservation status
- Least Concern (IUCN 3.1)

Scientific classification
- Kingdom: Animalia
- Phylum: Chordata
- Class: Actinopterygii
- Division: Teleostei
- Order: Acanthuriformes
- Family: Priacanthidae
- Genus: Priacanthus
- Species: P. arenatus

Binomial name
- Priacanthus arenatus Cuvier, 1829

Synonyms
- Priacanthus fulgens Lowe, 1838; Priacanthus insularum Johnson, 1862; Priacanthus catalufa Poey, 1863

= Priacanthus arenatus =

Species of fish

Priacanthus arenatus, the toro or Atlantic bigeye, is a species of marine ray finned fish, a bigeye in the family Priacanthidae. Some anglers refer to this fish as "toro snapper", but it is not a snapper, and only distantly related to the fish of the snapper family. It is found across much of the Atlantic Ocean.

== Description ==
The Atlantic bigeye is a small to medium sized perciform fish. Almost all parts of the fish are entirely reddish-orange, including the eyes. The dorsal fin has 10 spines, and 14 rays. The anal fin has 3 spines and 15 rays. Atlantic bigeye are commonly found at around 14 inches (36 cm). The IGFA world record is 50 cm, or about 20 in, caught in 2001. The eyes of the Atlantic bigeye are large, due to being primarily nocturnal feeders. Atlantic bigeye form small aggregations near the bottom of the ocean at night.

== Distribution ==
Atlantic bigeye are widely distributed across both the Northern and Southern Atlantic Ocean. It is widely distributed throughout the subtropical and tropical regions of the Atlantic. In the Western Atlantic, the Atlantic bigeye is distributed from the Northeastern United States to Northern Argentina. Juvenile fish in the Western Atlantic occasionally stray as far North as Nova Scotia in Canada due to the Gulf Stream, though these fish do not stay for long in the area as the Atlantic bigeye cannot survive cold water temperatures. In the Eastern Atlantic, they are found from West Morocco to Northern Angola. A single individual was reported in the Mediterranean Sea off Sardinia, Italy, in 1979.

They are found at several levels of the water column, from 10 m to over 250 m, though they most commonly occur between 30 m and 50 m. Juveniles tend to be pelagic in the upper levels of the water column.

== Habitat and biology ==
The Atlantic bigeye lives on rocky bottom ocean floors and coral reefs. It prefers the outer reef slopes in comparison to many smaller reef fish, and is also common around rocky outcrops on the continental shelf. It is primarily a nocturnal feeder. Its diet consists of small fish, bristle worms and crustaceans. Most of its prey is the larvae of other reef animals. Atlantic bigeye specimens are hard to collect and observe for science, as they are primarily nocturnal, and skittish.

== Uses ==
Atlantic bigeye are a minor commercial species, often caught as bycatch. Low numbers are taken by trawling, spearing, and hook-and-line. The flesh is marketed fresh, and is considered to be of excellent quality. Atlantic bigeye is also occasionally targeted by recreational anglers who fish at night, though many consider it a nuisance fish as they are very common bycatch while fishing for much larger porgy, grouper or snapper. It also reportedly has a foul odor when caught, reminiscent of rotting garbage.
