= Popeye the Sailor (disambiguation) =

Popeye the Sailor is a cartoon fictional character created by Elzie Crisler Segar.

Popeye the Sailor may refer to:

- Popeye the Sailor (film), a 1933 animated short that is billed as a Betty Boop cartoon
- Popeye the Sailor (film series), a 1933–1957 animated series of comedy short films
- Popeye the Sailor (TV series), a 1960–1963 animated television series
- Popeye the Sailor filmography (Fleischer Studios)
- Popeye the Sailor filmography (Famous Studios)
