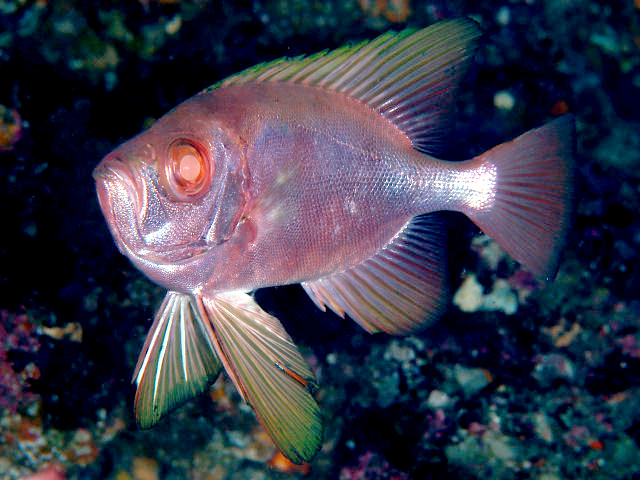
- Cookeolus japonicus

Scientific classification
- Kingdom: Animalia
- Phylum: Chordata
- Class: Actinopterygii
- Order: Acanthuriformes
- Family: Priacanthidae
- Genus: Cookeolus; Fowler, 1928

Type species
- Cookeolus japonicus (Cuvier, 1829)

= Cookeolus =

Genus of fishes

Cookeolus is a genus of marine ray-finned fishes from the family Priacanthidae, the bigeyes. It contains one extant species and one extinct species.

== Species ==
The following species are classified within the genus Cookeolus:

- Cookeolus japonicus (Cuvier, 1829) – Longfinned bullseye
- †Cookeolus spinolacrymatus Kon & Yoshino, 1997

† means extinct.
