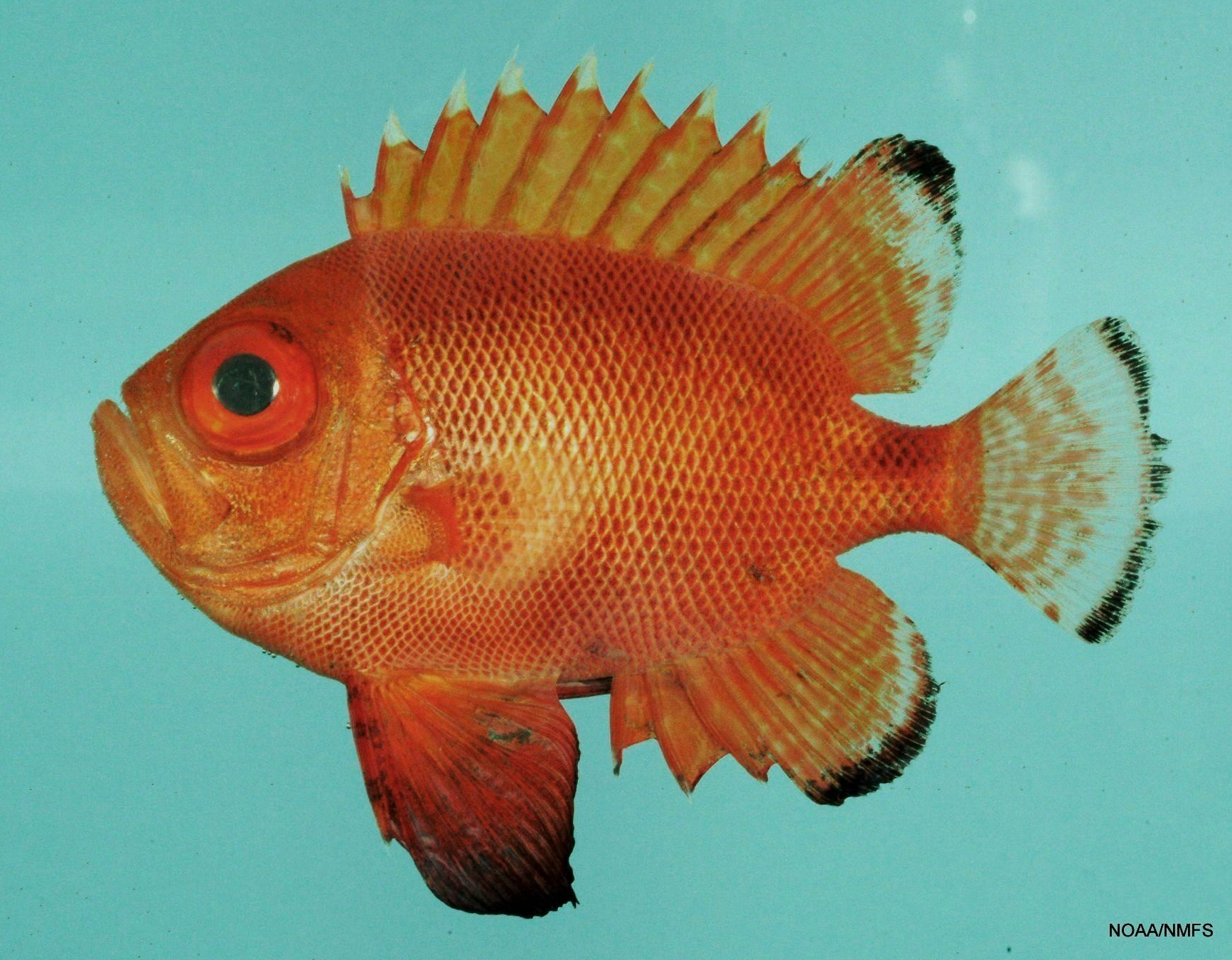
- Pristigenys alta
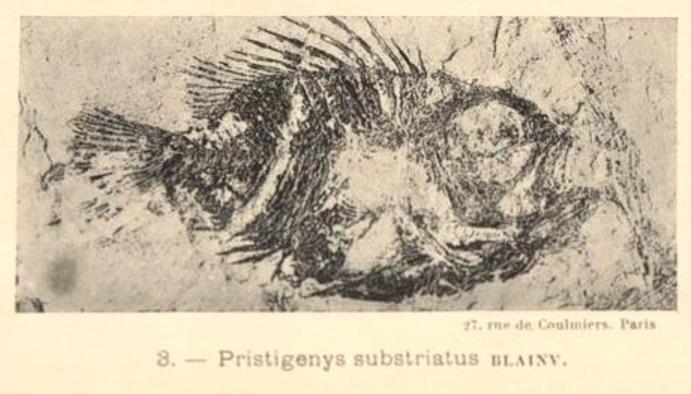
- Holotype of P. substriata: MNHN.

Scientific classification
- Kingdom: Animalia
- Phylum: Chordata
- Class: Actinopterygii
- Order: Acanthuriformes
- Family: Priacanthidae
- Genus: Pristigenys; Agassiz, 1835

Type species
- †Chaetodon substriatus Blainville, 1818

Synonyms
- Pseudopriacanthus Bleeker, 1869

= Pristigenys =

Genus of ray-finned fishes

Pristigenys is a genus of marine ray-finned fish in the family Priacanthidae. It contains five extant species and one extinct species, P. substriata, which is known from fossils found in the Eocene of Monte Bolca, Italy.

The extant species have been classified in the genus Pseudopriacanthus which both Fishbase and the Catalog of Fishes treat as a synonym of Pristigenys, but recent work has argued that they should be separated based on numerous differences in the cranial region and the fins.

== Species ==
The following species are classified in the genus Pristigenys:

- Pristigenys alta (Gill, 1862) - Short bigeye
- Pristigenys meyeri (Günther, 1872)
- Pristigenys niphonia (Cuvier, 1829) - Japanese bigeye
- Pristigenys refulgens (Valenciennes, 1862)
- Pristigenys serrula (Gilbert, 1891) - Popeye catalufa
- †Pristigenys substriatus (Blainville, 1818)
