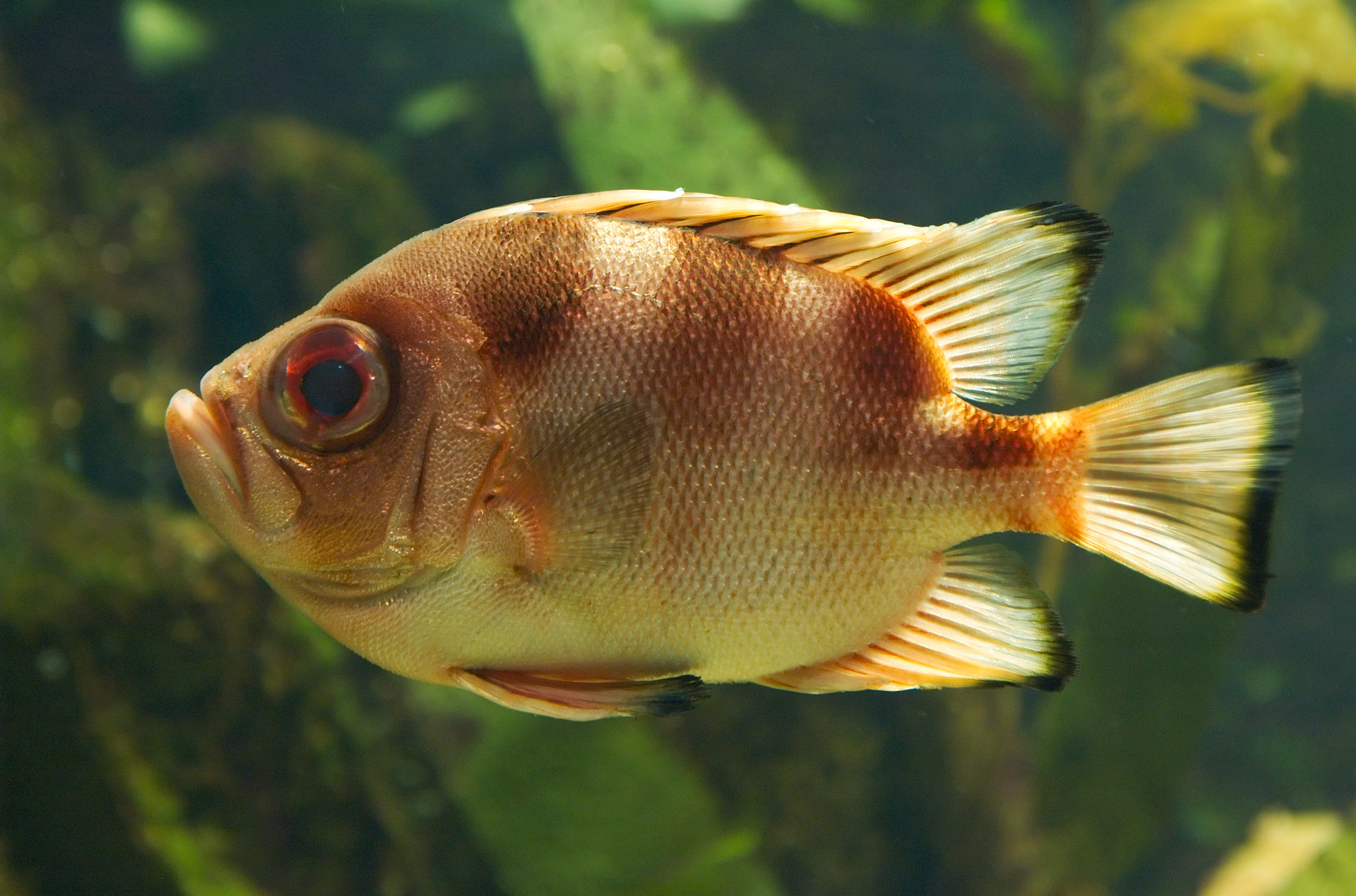

Conservation status
- Least Concern (IUCN 3.1)

Scientific classification
- Kingdom: Animalia
- Phylum: Chordata
- Class: Actinopterygii
- Order: Acanthuriformes
- Family: Priacanthidae
- Genus: Pristigenys
- Species: P. serrula

Binomial name
- Pristigenys serrula (Gilbert, 1891)

Synonyms
- Priacanthus serrula Gilbert, 1891; Pseudopriacanthus serrula (Gilbert, 1891); Pseudopriacanthus lucasanus Clark, 1936

= Popeye catalufa =

Species of fish

The popeye catalufa (Pristigenys serrula), also known as the bigeye soldierfish, is a species of marine ray-finned fish in the family Priacanthidae, the bigeyes. This fish has an overall dusky orange to red colour with white markings. The dorsal fin appears feathery while rest of fins have black margins. It occurs in the eastern Pacific, where it is found from Oregon to Chile. It occasionally makes its way into the aquarium trade. It grows to a size of 34 centimetres (13 in) in length. This species is nocturnal and shy, preferring deeper waters off islands. It has been recorded associating with squirrelfishes and cardinalfishes but the popeye catalufa goes as deep as 76 metres (249 ft), deeper than its associated species. This species has been recorded from rocky habitats at depths of less than 5 metres (16 ft) to over 100 metres (330 ft). It is a carnivorous species and, when kept in captivity, is known to feed on worms, crustaceans and brittle stars.

== Geographic range ==
Pristigenys serrula is found as an unfragmented population all the way from Oregon to Chile, and even the Galápagos Islands and Panama. Oregon sightings are the extremities of the range and most of the population density is along the coast of California and Central America. These fishes extend into temperate regions in association with warm ocean currents although there has not been observations of this family in other typical temperate species. Locations such as New Zealand or the Mediterranean Sea which are typical of the fishes that follow these currents.

== Habitat ==
The family of Pristigenys are an epibenthic group that are found in rocky or coral environments around depths from 5 to 400 m and have been observed in some caves within its geographic range. This is only true of the adults of this family, as the eggs, larvae, and juvenile stages are found in open water and stay near the middle of the water column until they mature.

== Physical description ==
P. serulla have been observed to grow to 34 cm (13 in), but most often are around 20 cm 20 cm (7.9 in). The body of the fish is compressiform, deep and robust, with large eyes that are around a third of the length of the head. The species has an upward projecting mouth. The most noticeable trait that gets this fish aquarium attention is its bright red iris, body, and darkly detailed tail and fins. P. serrula's preopercular and preorbital margins serrate. The gill rakers present are short with 16 rakers on the horizontal limb of the outer arch.

The dorsal fin has 10–11 rays, and pectoral rays numbering from 17–18. The dorsal fin is continuous for this species along with the anal fin containing 10 to 11 soft rays. This species also has very small ctenoid scales and lateral line scales 42 to 51. There is a tall, dorsal spine with the first and last spines being much shorter and equaling the rays in length. The spines on the anal fin are similar but much shorter. The pectoral fins are the smallest fins and barely reach the pelvic fins. The pelvic fins are elongated and about the same length as the anal fin. Pelvic fins spines are long enough to reach the base of the second anal spine. Some unique textures of the respective fins are that the dorsal and anal fins are covered in a sheath and also that the vertical fins are dusky with the soft parts being slightly speckled. The ventricles are black and the pectorals pale. All spines of the fish roughly serrate. The species's gular, maxillary, mandible, and branchiostegal membranes are coated with spiny scales. The colors of P. serulla are of light olive tones, striped with four laterally darkened striations which are wider than the between spaces. The last striation is located on the base of the caudal peduncle. The caudal peduncle of this species is remarkably longer than others in this family.

== Development ==
The eggs, larvae and early juvenile stages of the priacanthid species are pelagic, remaining only in the middle of the water column while they mature. Once they have sufficiently grown and found a habitat to settle in, they transform into fully matured crevice and reef dwelling epibenthic fishes. The development of this fish involves 4 different stages: the larval stage, the preflexion stage, the postflextion stage, and the fully developed adult form transformation. In the preflexion stage the pigmentation starts to appear on the top of the head and underneath the mouth. In the time from flexion to post-flexion the pigmentation has spread to the lower part of the supraoccipital spine, increased on the head, increased on the gut, and begun to make its way to the caudal fin. By the transformation stage the fish is fully pigmented except on its caudal tail.

== Reproduction ==
Reproduction of some Pristigengys and Priacanthus species show the eggs being small, spherical, and planktonic from which small larvae hatch with a yolk sac, unpigmented eyes, and undeveloped mouth. These fishes let groups of their eggs out into the open water for scattering and don't show parental care for their eggs. The spawning season for this species has been estimated to occur from between August and December as this is when the larvae are primarily spotted.

== Lifespan ==
The lifespan of this specific species of fish is not yet supported by much or any data. Although, large specimens have been examined by Fitch and Schultz were estimated to be around 9 or more years old. In another case, a specimen of P. serrula that was 33 cm (13 in) in length was estimated to be about 15 years old using otoliths.

== Behavior ==
Pristigenys are reef and crevice dwelling marine fish that can be found swimming above the sediment layer at the bottom of the ocean at almost all hours of the day near holes in the sediment. These fish are carnivorous and nocturnal feeders but some have been observed feeding diurnally in cave habitats. Any of the feeding P. serrula does during the day is highly opportunistic. Caldwell and Bullis writes their observations of an aquarium specimen of priacanthids appearing to sleep at night contrary to the wild fishes of this family foraging and feeding at night. Another important behavioral trait of this family of fishes is that they have been shown to produce sound and possibly receive it from one another.

== Food habits ==
Species of priacanthids feed on a diet of crustaceans, small cephalopods, polychaetes, and small fishes. These fish are most often found to be the predators of some smaller macrofauna, especially crabs. Other creatures they prey on include octopuses, pelagic shrimp, stomatopods, small fish and polychaetes.

== Predation ==
Data pinpointing the specific predators of P. serrula is not very clear but another species, Priacanthus japonicus, belonging to the same family have been found in the stomach of yellowfin tuna along with being parasitized by the copepod Caligus cookeoli.
