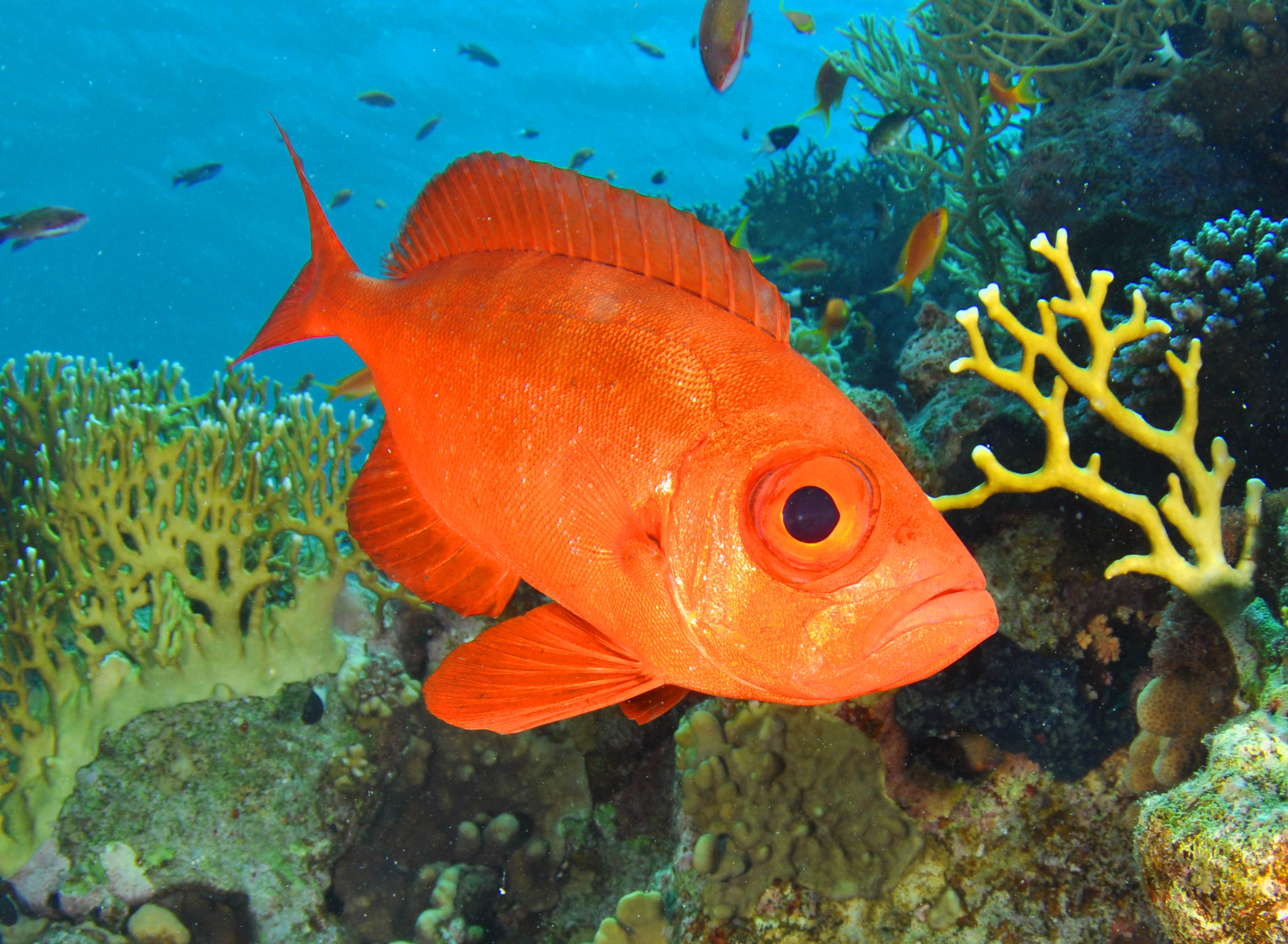

Conservation status
- Least Concern (IUCN 3.1)

Scientific classification
- Kingdom: Animalia
- Phylum: Chordata
- Class: Actinopterygii
- Order: Acanthuriformes
- Family: Priacanthidae
- Genus: Priacanthus
- Species: P. blochii

Binomial name
- Priacanthus blochii Bleeker, 1853

= Priacanthus blochii =

Species of fish

Priacanthus blochii, the paeony bulleye, is a species of marine ray finned fish, a bigeye in the family Priacanthidae. Other common names for this species include Bloch's bigeye, blotched bigeye, glass-eye bigeye, shortfin bigeye, silver big-eye and goggle eye.

== Description ==
Priacanthus blochii has a red body and is commonly 40 centimetres (16 in) in length. The lateral line has a line of approximately 15 dark spots. Both the pelvic and median fins are a dusky red colour. At the base of the first 3 pelvic rays, a black spot is present. It can change colour as its mood changes.

== Distribution ==
Priacanthus blochii occurs in the waters of southern Africa to French Polynesia. It is found as far south as Australia and north to the southern waters of Japan. It has also been recorded around Easter Island and as well as in the Red Sea.

== Habitat ==
Priacanthus blochii is found at depths of 8 to 250 metres in caves or under ledges and inhabits lagoons and seaward reefs. It is frequently found in silty areas. The species is normally encountered as solitary fish or in small groups.

== Species description and etymology ==
Priacanthus blochii was first formally described in 1853 by the Dutch ichthyologist and herpetologist Pieter Bleeker (1819–1874) with the type localities given as Jakarta, Indonesia, Java Sea, eastern Indian Ocean; Sibogha, western Sumatra, Indonesia, eastern Indian Ocean; Ambon Bay, Ambon Island, Molucca Islands, Indonesia. The German zoologist Marcus Elieser Bloch (1723–1799) is mentioned in Bleeker's description several times and it is likely that the specific name honours Bloch.
