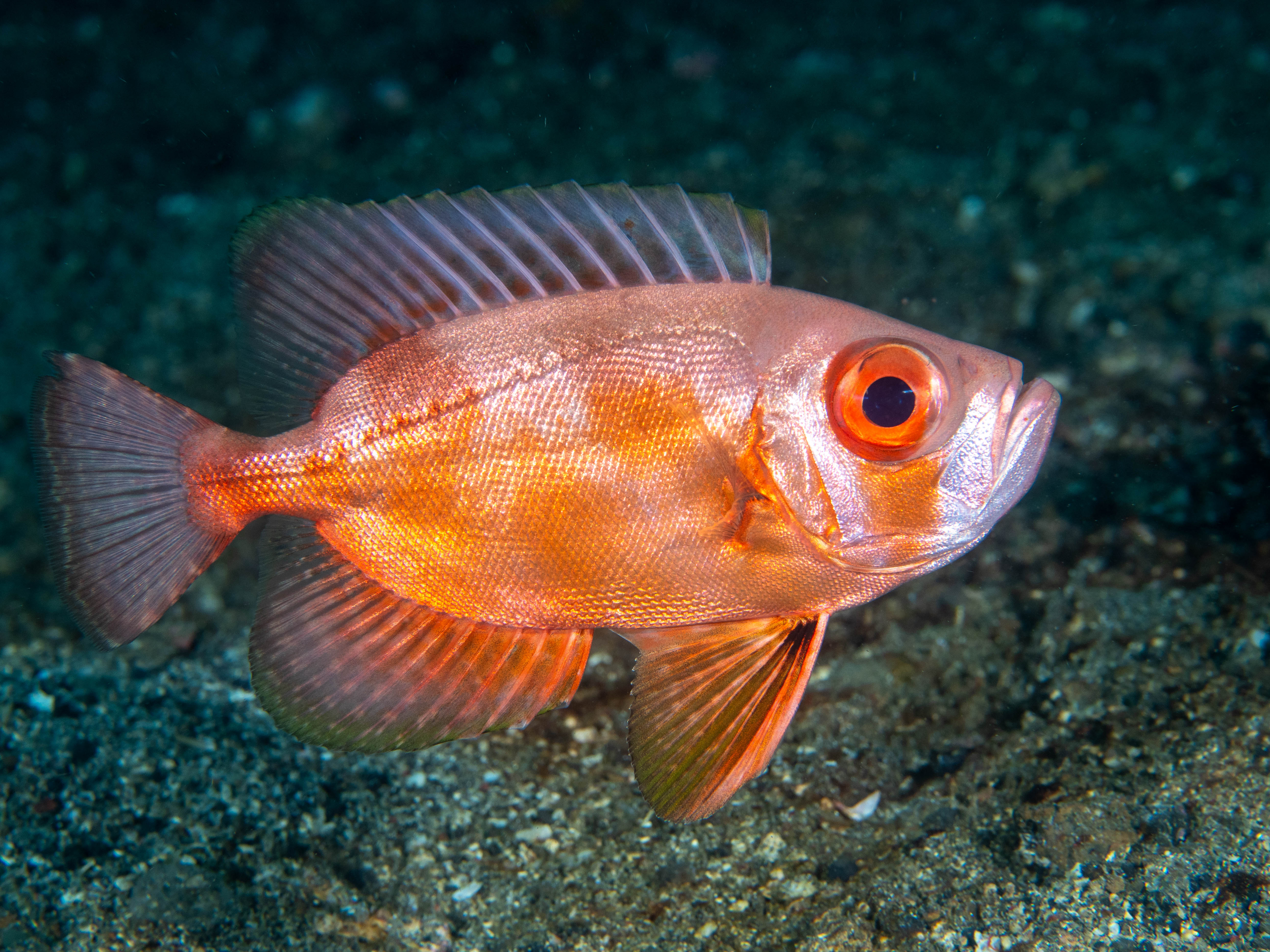

Scientific classification
- Kingdom: Animalia
- Phylum: Chordata
- Class: Actinopterygii
- Division: Teleostei
- Order: Acanthuriformes
- Family: Priacanthidae
- Genus: Heteropriacanthus; Fitch & Crooke, 1984
- Species: H. cruentatus

Binomial name
- Heteropriacanthus cruentatus (Lacépède, 1801)

Synonyms
- Anthias boops Forster, 1801; Cookeolus boops (Forster, 1801); Labrus cruentatus Lacepède, 1801; Priacanthus bonariensis Cuvier, 1829; Priacanthus boops (Forster, 1801); Priacanthus cepedianus Desmarest, 1823; Priacanthus cruentatus (Lacepède, 1801); Serranus rufus Bowdich, 1825

= Heteropriacanthus =

Genus of ray-finned fishes

Heteropriacanthus, the glasseyes or glass bigeyes, are a genus of the bigeye family found in all tropical seas around the world. It occasionally makes its way into the aquarium trade. It grows to a size of 50.7 cm (20.0 in) in total length.

The glasseyes has been classified in a single species, Heteropriacanthus cruentatus, but recent morphological and genetic analysis indicates that glasseyes may be better divided into three species: Heteropriacanthus cruentatus (Atlantic Ocean and southwest Indian Ocean), H. fulgens (northeastern Atlantic), and H. carolinus (Indo-Pacific). H. cruentatus can differentiated from the rest of its genus by looking at its caudal and anal fin in which is distinct in colour.
