= Coral cod =

Coral cod is the common name for several types of fish, including these fish from the following families:

== Anthiadidae ==
- Epinephelides armatus

== Epinephelidae ==
- Cephalopholis miniata
- Cephalopholis nigripinnis
- Cephalopholis sonnerati
- Epinephelus corallicola

== Scorpaenidae ==
- Helicolenus barathri
- Helicolenus percoides
- Scorpaena jacksoniensis
