= Cephalopholis formosa =

Conservation status
- Least Concern (IUCN 3.1)

Scientific classification
- Kingdom: Animalia
- Phylum: Chordata
- Class: Actinopterygii
- Division: Teleostei
- Order: Perciformes
- Family: Epinephelidae
- Genus: Cephalopholis
- Species: C. formosa

Binomial name
- Cephalopholis formosa (Shaw, 1812)

Synonyms
- Sciaena formosa Shaw, 1812

Species of fish

Cephalopholis formosa, the Bluelined hind or bluelined rockcod is a species of marine ray-finned fish, a grouper from the subfamily Epinephelinae which is in the family Serranidae which also includes the anthias and sea basses. It is found in the Indo-Pacific where it is associated with reefs. It is sometimes found in the aquarium trade.

== Taxonomy ==
Cephalopholis formosa was first formally described as Sciaena formosa in 1812 by the English naturalist George Shaw (1751–1813) with the book he wrote with the illustrator Frederick Polydore Nodder, The Naturalist's Miscellany, or coloured figures of natural objects; drawn and described from nature with the type locality given as Vizagapatam in India.

== Distribution ==
Cephalopholis formosa is found in the shallow, coastal waters of the continent and continental islands of the eastern Indian Ocean and the Western Pacific Ocean; the only oceanic islands where it is found are the Lakshadweep Islands. It is found from the Lakshadweeps and Sri Lanka east to the Philippines. It extends as far north as Honshu in Japan and south to Australia, where it has been recorded only from the Northwest Shelf of Western Australia.

It has also been recorded in the Persian Gulf. Records from the Mascarenes are probably misidentifications of Cephalolophis polleni while those from the Great Barrier Reef probably refer to C. boenak. It may have been introduced outside of its native range due to escapes or releases from aquaria.

== Description ==
In Thailand

Cephalopholis formosa has a body which is between two and a half to just under three times as long as it is deep. It has a rounded, finely serrated preopercle rounded which has a fleshy lower edge. There are 47 to 51 in the lateral line There are 9 spines and 15-17 soft rays in the dorsal fin while the anal fin has 3 spines and 7-8 soft rays. The caudal fin is rounded. The scales on the body, including the abdomen, are ctenoid. The body is dark brown to yellowish brown in color with thin blue stripes. There are small black and blue spots on the lips, snout, lower part of the head and the chest. They attain a maximum total length of 34 centimetres (13 in).

== Habitat and biology ==
Cephalopholis formosa is found in shallow waters over silty or dead reefs. It is a solitary species. It is found at depths between 10 and 30 metres (33 and 98 ft). It is a predatory species which feeds on other fishes and crustaceans.

== Utilisation ==
Cephalopholis formosa is relatively small species of grouper is not normally a target for commercial fisheries. Local artisanal and subsistence fisheries take these fish as a bycatch using by hook and line, traps and trawls. In India it is exploited for food but it is also prized as an aquarium fish and fishing effort for this purpose is expected to increase.

== Gallery ==
In Thailand

In Thailand
