= Leopard grouper =

Leopard grouper refers to two species of fish in the Serranidae family:

- Mycteroperca rosacea
- Cephalopholis leopardus
