= Cephalopholis spiloparaea =

- In Mauritius

Conservation status
- Least Concern (IUCN 3.1)

Scientific classification
- Kingdom: Animalia
- Phylum: Chordata
- Class: Actinopterygii
- Division: Teleostei
- Order: Perciformes
- Family: Epinephelidae
- Genus: Cephalopholis
- Species: C. spiloparaea

Binomial name
- Cephalopholis spiloparaea (Valenciennes, 1828)

Synonyms
- Serranus spiloparaeus Valenciennes, 1828; Cephalopholis spiloparae (Valenciennes, 1828)

Species of fish

Cephalopholis spiloparaea, known commonly as the strawberry hind, strawberry rock cod, strawberry cod, or orange rock cod, is a species of marine ray-finned fish, a grouper of the family Epinephelidae. This fish occurs throughout the Indo-Pacific.

== Distribution ==
Cephalopholis spiloparaea has a wide Indo-Pacific distribution from the East African coasts where it extends from Kenya south to Pinda in Mozambique, east across the Indian Ocean into the pacific as far east as French Polynesia and Pitcairn Island. They occur as far north as the Ryukyu Islands and south to the Rowley Shoals in Western Australia and Heron Island in the southern part of Queensland's Great Barrier Reef.

== Description ==
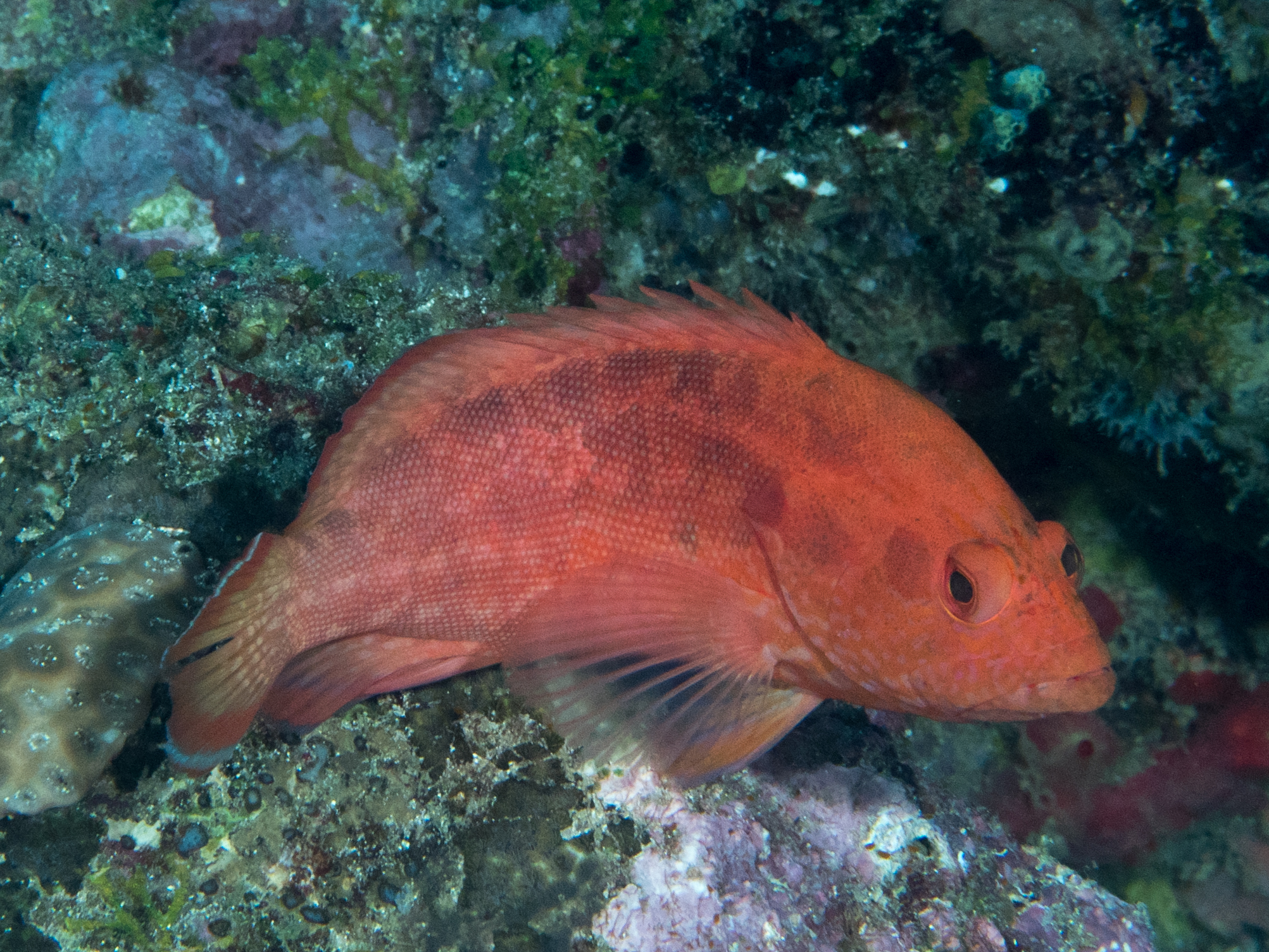
In Indonesia

Cephalopholis spiloparaea has a body which has a standard length is 2.6 to 3 times the depth. The dorsal fin has 9 spines and 14-16 soft rays while the anal fin has 3 spines and 9-10 soft rays. The pectoral fins are markedly longer than the pelvic fins and it has a rounded caudal fin. There are 47-53 scales in the lateral line. The background colour is pale reddish orange and it is marked with dark red or brownish red mottling and blotches. There are normally faint pale spots on the head, body, and dorsal, anal and caudal fins. The caudal fin is normally the same colour as the body, although some specimens from the Comoros Islands show distinctly yellowish tails, with a bluish white submarginal band at the corners of the tail, thinning and moving to the margin at the tail's centre. The margin of the soft-rayed part of the anal fin and, to s lesser extent the dorsal fin, is bluish. Sometimes here are 8 faint dark saddle blotches along the base of the dorsal fin with a ninth on the anterior of the caudal peduncle. This species attains a maximum total length of 30 centimetres (12 in).

== Habitat and biology ==
Cephalopholis spiloparaea is largely found in islands, apart from the population at Pinda in Mozambique. It is an inhabitant of coral reefs at depths greater than 40 metres (130 ft). It is the commonest species of grouper on these types of reef in the Indo-Pacific. It has been shown to live in harems dominated by a male. They feed on crabs and other crustaceans and normally forage at night or in the very early morning, just before or just after dawn.

== Utilisation ==
Cephalopholis spiloparaea is of minor commercial importance to fisheries but the depth at which it is found appears to offer some protection from overexploitation.
