= Cephalopholis polleni =

Conservation status
- Least Concern (IUCN 3.1)

Scientific classification
- Kingdom: Animalia
- Phylum: Chordata
- Class: Actinopterygii
- Division: Teleostei
- Order: Perciformes
- Family: Epinephelidae
- Genus: Cephalopholis
- Species: C. polleni

Binomial name
- Cephalopholis polleni (Bleeker, 1868)

Synonyms
- List: Epinephelus polleni Bleeker, 1868; Aethaloperca polleni (Bleeker, 1868); Gracila polleni (Bleeker, 1868); Plectropoma lineatum Bliss, 1883; Cephalopholis virgatus Fourmanoir, 1955; Gracila okinawae Katayama, 1974

Species of fish

Cephalopholis polleni, the harlequin hind, harlequin grouper, harlequin cod, harlequin rockcod or blue-lined grouper, is a species of marine ray-finned fish, a grouper of the family Epinephelidae. This fish occurs around offshore islands of the Indo-Pacific. It occasionally makes its way into the aquarium trade.

== Taxonomy ==
Cephalopholis polleni was first formally described as Epinephelus polleni by the Dutch ichthyologist Pieter Bleeker (1819-1878) with the type locality given as Réunion.

=== Etymology ===
Its specific name honours François Pollen (1842-1888), a Dutch naturalist and merchant, who collected the type when visiting Réunion with fellow Dutch naturalist and explorer Douwe Casparus van Dam (1827-1898).

== Distribution ==
Cephalopholis polleni has a scattered distribution on offshore islands in the Indian Ocean and Western Pacific Ocean from the Comoro Islands to the Line Islands and French Polynesia. It has not been recorded from the Red Sea, the eastern African coast, Sri Lanka, continental Australia and the major islands of Indonesia. In Australia it has been recorded from Christmas Island and Cocos (Keeling) Island.

== Description ==
Cephalopholis polleni has been recorded growing up to a total length of 43 centimetres (17 in). It has a body depth which is shorter than the length of its head, the standard length being 2.7 to 3.1 times the depth. It has a slightly truncated caudal fin and a finely serrated, rounded preopercle. The maxilla reached beyond the back of the eye. There are 9 spines in the dorsal fin and 14-16 soft rays, while the anal fin has 3 spines and 8-9 soft rays.

This is a yellow to greenish-yellow grouper which is covered in bright blue stripes. Juveniles up to a standard length of 4 centimetres (1.6 in) are yellowish brown, shading to lavender on the chest and belly and to yellow at base of the tail with the yellow extending as a wide band on both lobes of the caudal fin. They also have a yellow snout and a large black spot on both sides anterior to the nostrils. The larger juvenile, up to a standard length of 10 centimetres (3.9 in) become brownish orange with horizontal purple stripes on the head and body.

== Habitat and biology ==
Cephalopholis polleni occurs around oceanic islands where it can be found in clear waters in the vicinity of steep drop-offs and it is infrequently recorded from depths of less than 30 metres (98 ft) and has been taken as deep as 120 metres (390 ft), possibly occurring at even greater depths. It is frequently observed in caves and under overhangs where it swims upside-down against the roofs of caves or archways. It is a solitary predatory species which feeds on smaller fishes and crustaceans.

== Utilisation ==
Cephalopholis polleni is a rather small and rare species and is of little interest to fisheries. It occasionally enters the aquarium trade.
