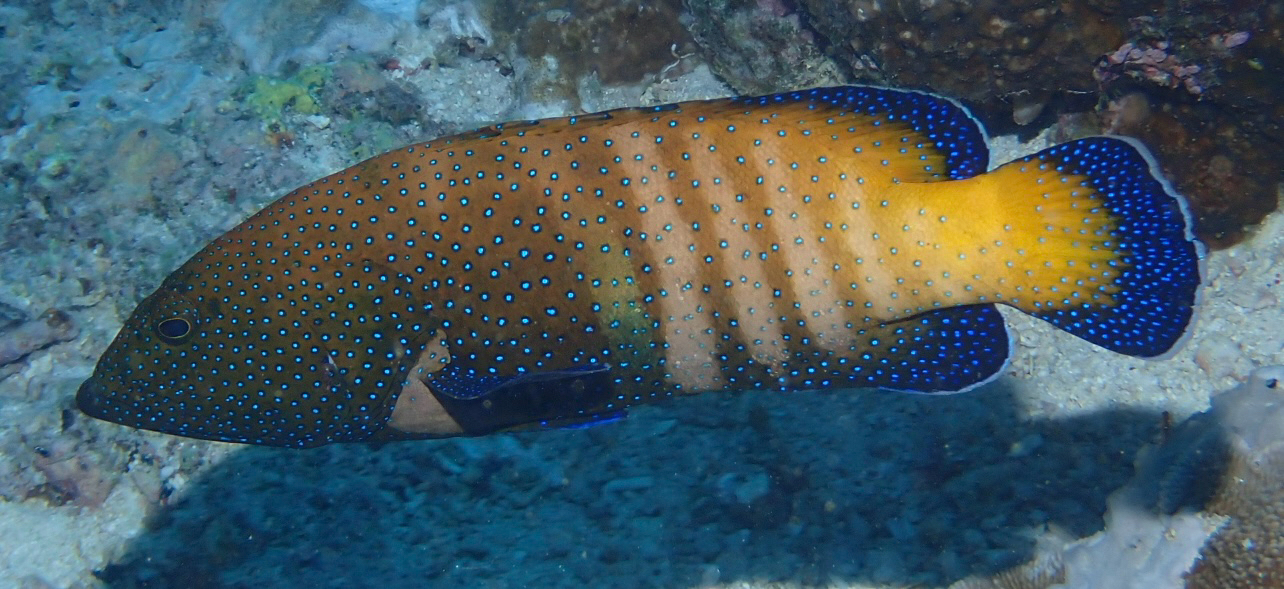
- Cephalopholis argus

Scientific classification
- Kingdom: Animalia
- Phylum: Chordata
- Class: Actinopterygii
- Division: Teleostei
- Order: Perciformes
- Family: Epinephelidae
- Genus: Cephalopholis; Bloch & Schneider, 1801

Type species
- Cephalopholis argus Schneider, 1801

Synonyms
- Enneacentrus Gill, 1865; Petrometopon Gill, 1865; Uriphaeton Swainson, 1839

= Cephalopholis =

Genus of fishes

Cephalopholis is a genus of marine ray-finned fish, groupers from the subfamily Epinephelinae in the family Serranidae, which also includes the anthias and sea basses. Many of the species have the word "hind" as part of their common name in English.

== Taxonomy ==
Recent molecular analyses have challenged the placement of the redmouth grouper in the monospecific genus Aethaloperca, in a study based on five different genes this species fell within the Cephalopholis clade, thus suggesting that the species should be included in this genus and referred to as Cephalopholis rogaa. Similarly, the masked grouper of the monospecific genus Gracila and the two species of creolefish (Paranthias colonus and Paranthias furcifer) were found to be nested within Cephalopholis.

== Species ==
Cephalolophis contains the following 25 species:

Image	Species	Common name
	Cephalopholis aitha Randall & Heemstra, 1991	Rusty hind
	Cephalopholis argus Schneider, 1801	Peacock hind
	Cephalopholis aurantia (Valenciennes, 1828)	Golden hind
	Cephalopholis boenak (Bloch, 1790)	Chocolate hind
	Cephalopholis colonus (Valenciennes, 1846)	Pacific creole-fish
	Cephalopholis cruentata (Lacépède, 1802)	Graysby
	Cephalopholis cyanostigma (Valenciennes, 1828)	Bluespotted hind
	Cephalopholis formosa (Shaw, 1812)	Bluelined hind
	Cephalopholis fulva (Linnaeus, 1758)	Coney
	Cephalopholis hemistiktos (Rüppell, 1830)	Yellowfin hind
	Cephalopholis igarashiensis Katayama, 1957	Garish hind
	Cephalopholis leopardus (Lacepède, 1801)	Leopard hind
	Cephalopholis microprion (Bleeker, 1852)	Freckled hind
	Cephalopholis miniata (Forsskål, 1775)	Coral hind
	Cephalopholis nigri (Günther, 1859)	Nigri hind
	Cephalopholis nigripinnis (Valenciennes, 1828)	Blackfin grouper
	Cephalopholis oligosticta Randall & Ben-Tuvia, 1983	Vermilion hind
	Cephalopholis panamensis (Steindachner 1876)	Pacific graysby
	Cephalopholis polleni (Bleeker, 1868)	Harlequin hind
	Cephalopholis polyspila Randall & Satapoomin, 2000	Andaman hind
	Cephalopholis sexmaculata (Rüppell 1830)	Sixblotch hind
	Cephalopholis sonnerati (Valenciennes 1828)	Tomato hind
	Cephalopholis spiloparaea (Valenciennes 1828)	Strawberry hind
	Cephalopholis taeniops (Valenciennes 1828)	Bluespotted seabass
	Cephalopholis urodeta (Forster, 1801)	Flagtail hind
