= Cephalopholis hemistiktos =

- In the Red Sea

Conservation status
- Least Concern (IUCN 3.1)

Scientific classification
- Kingdom: Animalia
- Phylum: Chordata
- Class: Actinopterygii
- Division: Teleostei
- Order: Perciformes
- Family: Epinephelidae
- Genus: Cephalopholis
- Species: C. hemistiktos

Binomial name
- Cephalopholis hemistiktos (Ruppell, 1830)
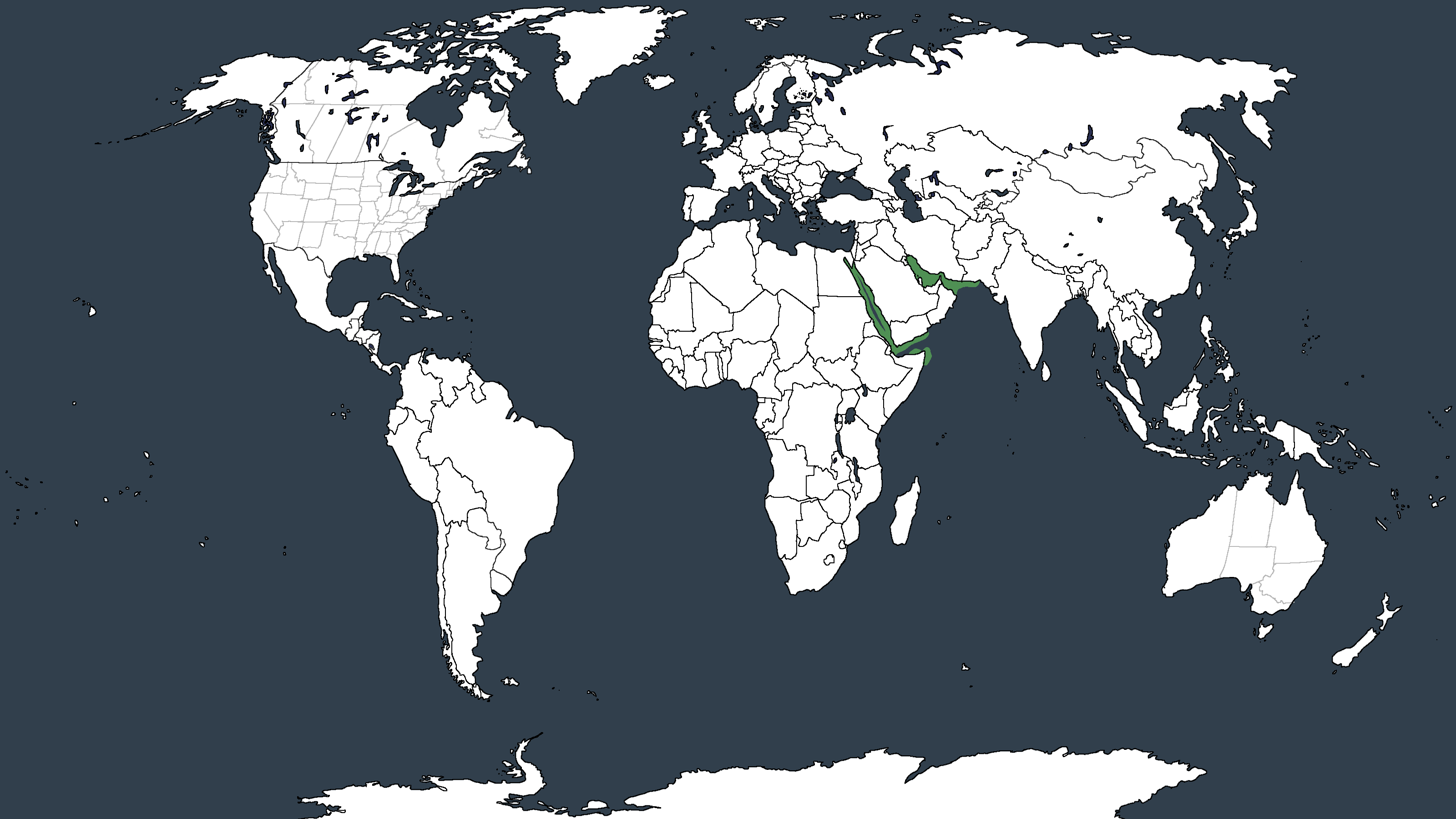

Synonyms
- Epinephelus hemistiktos (Ruppell, 1830); Cephalopholis minatus

Species of grouper

Cephalopholis hemistiktos, the yellowfin hind, is a species of marine ray-finned fish, a member of the family Serranidae, which also includes the anthias and sea basses. This species is found from the Red Sea to the Persian Gulf and the coast of Pakistan. A single specimen was filmed in 2009 in the Mediterranean Sea, off Malta.

== Habitat ==
This species is most commonly found in coral assemblages at depths slightly exceeding 50 metres, but can also be found in rocky regions. It may grow up to 35 centimetres in length.

== Description ==
It has 9 spines and 14 soft rays on its dorsal fin, and is deep red in colour. The margins of the fish's pectoral fins are yellow, being its namesake. The mouth of the hind has four "canine" teeth, used to grip and seize prey

== Gallery ==
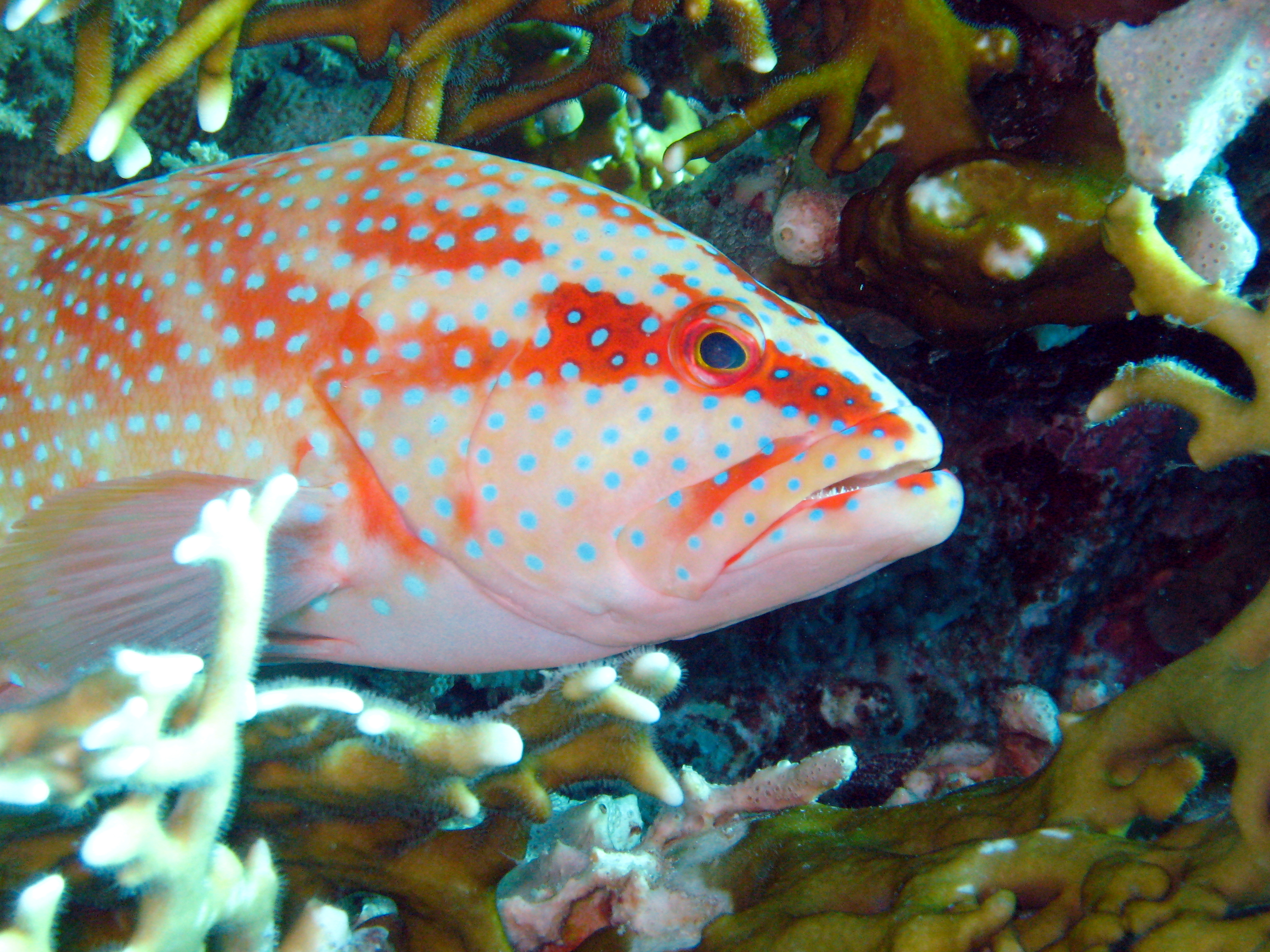
Red Sea

Red Sea

Red Sea

Red Sea

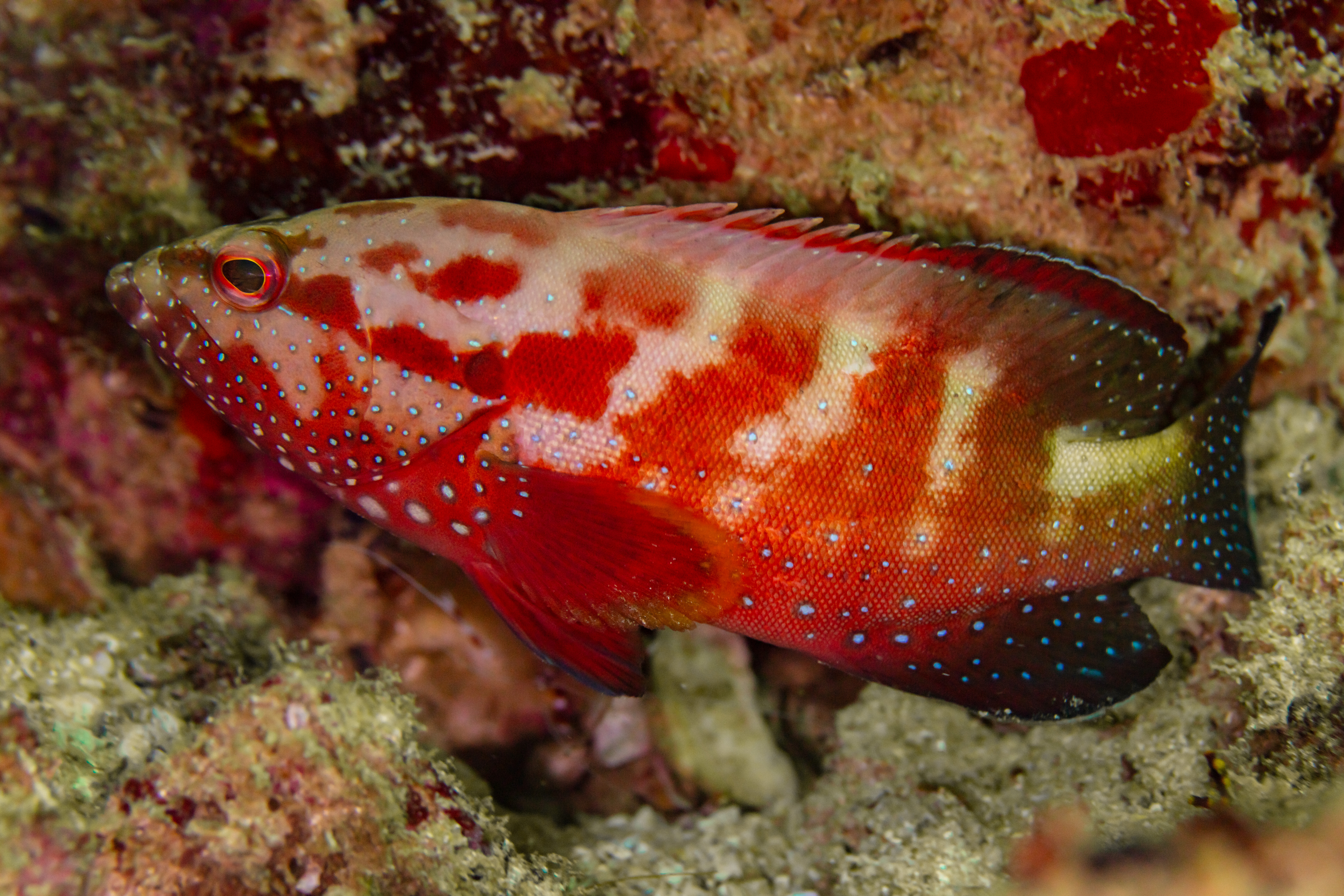
Gulf of Oman

Red Sea
