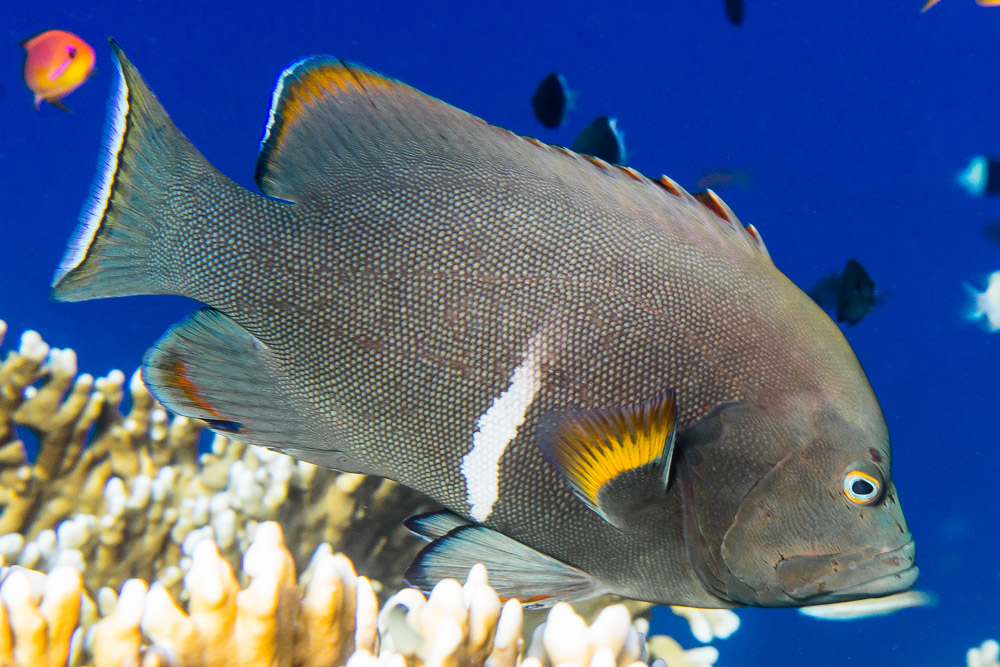

Conservation status
- Least Concern (IUCN 3.1)

Scientific classification
- Kingdom: Animalia
- Phylum: Chordata
- Class: Actinopterygii
- Division: Teleostei
- Order: Perciformes
- Suborder: Percoidei
- Family: Epinephelidae
- Genus: Aethaloperca; Fowler, 1904
- Species: A. rogaa

Binomial name
- Aethaloperca rogaa (Forsskål, 1775)

Synonyms
- Perca rogaa Forsskål, 1775; Cephalopholis rogaa (Forsskål, 1775); Perca lunaria Forsskål, 1775

= Redmouth grouper =

Species of fish

The redmouth grouper (Aethaloperca rogaa), also known as the red-flushed rock cod, is a species of ray-finned fish, a grouper in the family Epinephelidae. It has a wide distribution in the Indian and Pacific Oceans. It is considered a game fish.

== Taxonomy ==
The redmouth grouper was first formally described by the Swedish naturalist Peter Forsskål (1732-1763) as Perca rogaa with the type locality given as Jeddah. The description was published by Carsten Niebuhr in 1775 from filed notes edited by Johann Christian Fabricius and so the name is sometimes written as Perca rogaa Fabricius (ex Forsskål) in Niebuhr 1775.

Some authorities place the redmouth grouper as the only species in the monospecific genus Aethaloperca which was created in 1904 by the American ichthyologist Henry Weed Fowler as a subgenus of Bodianus. Recent molecular analyses challenge the placement of this species in the genus Aethaloperca. In a study based on five different genes, it was included in the Cephalopholis clade, thus suggesting that the species should be included in the genus Cephalopholis and referred to as Cephalopholis rogaa.

== Description ==
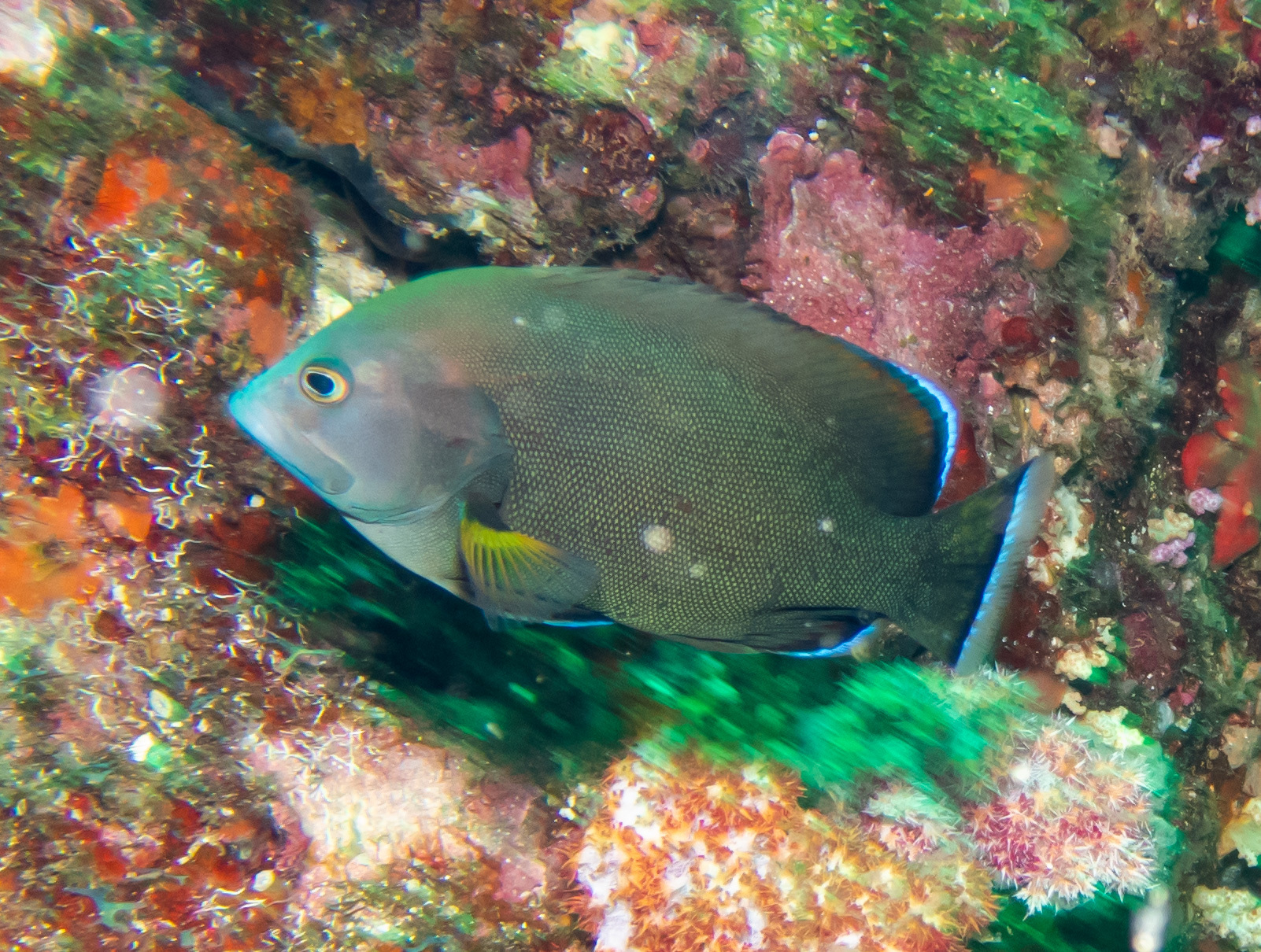
Juvenile, in Thailand

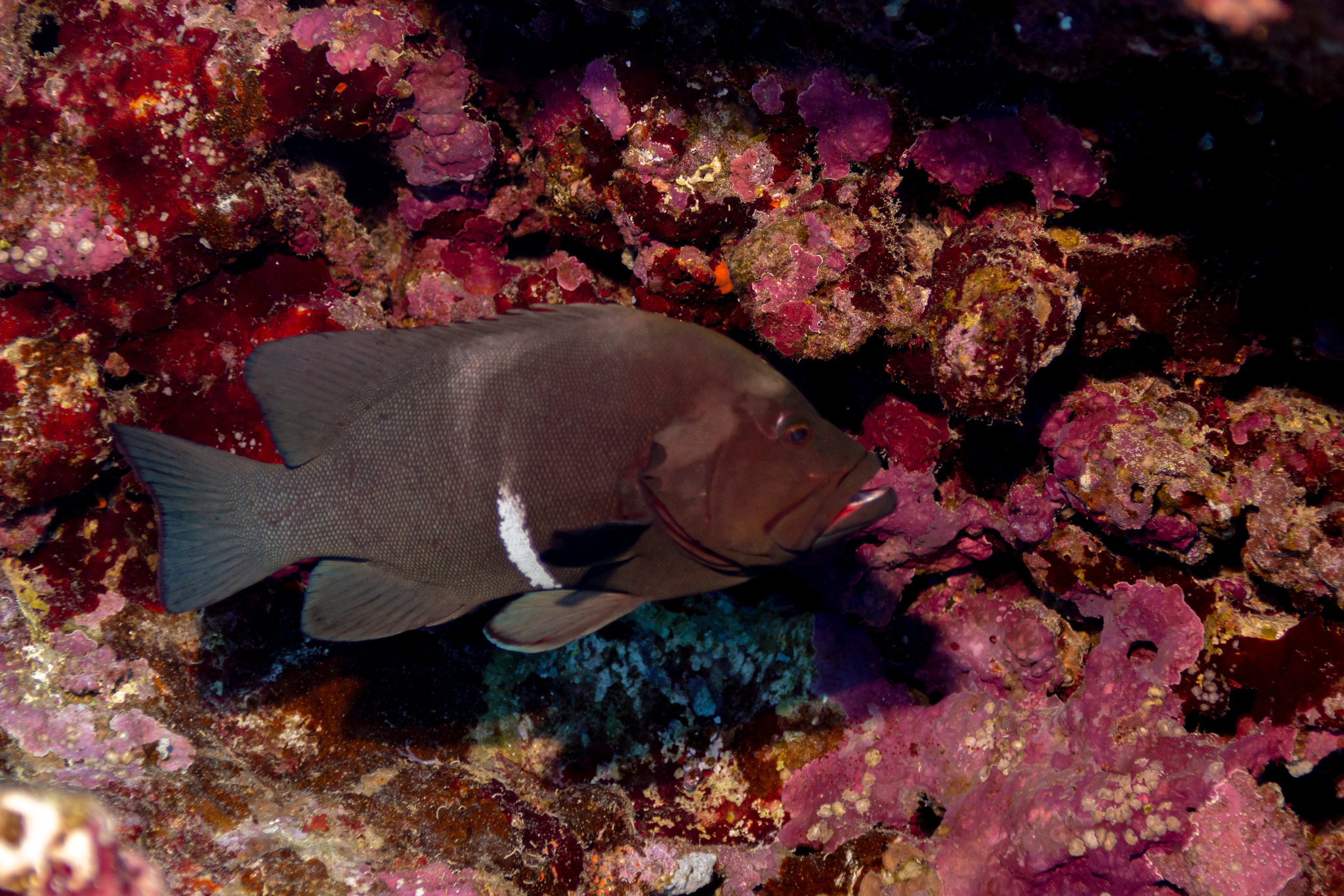
In the Red Sea

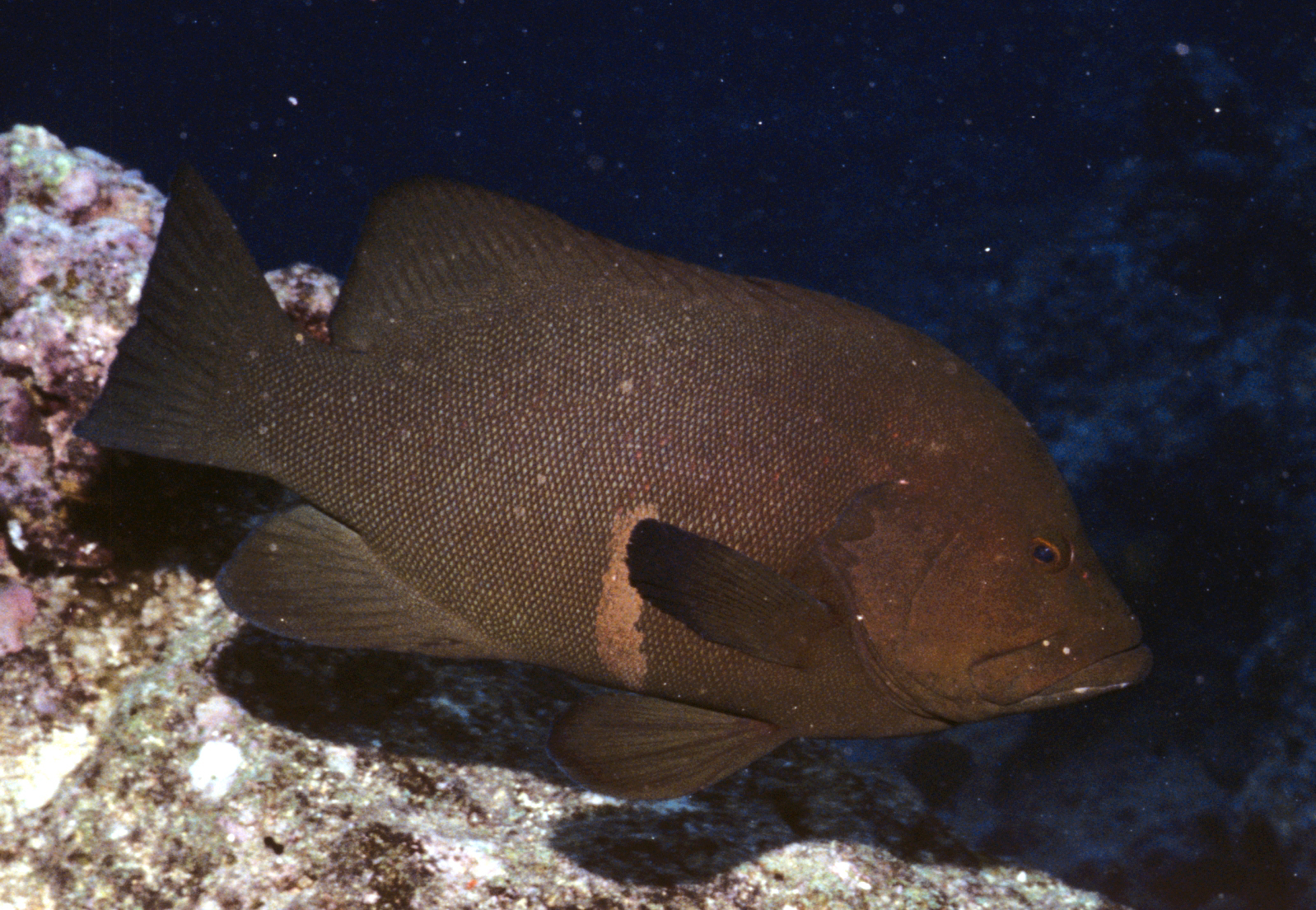
In Palau

The redmouth grouper is laterally compressed and oval shaped with a relatively deep body which is around half of the standard length and a large head. The dorsal profile of the head is straight or slightly concave while the anterior dorsal profile between the eye and the origin of the dorsal fin is convex. It jaw extends past its eye. The dorsal fin has 9 spines and 17-18 soft rays while the anal fin has 3 spines and 8-9 soft rays. The middle soft rays of the dorsal and anal fins are elongated in the adults which results in them having an angular profile. They have a caudal fin which is truncate and asymmetrical pectoral fins. The pelvic fins extend beyond the anus. The colour is dark brown to black, sometimes tinged with orange and a pale vertical bar on the lower flank. The rear part of the spiny portion of the dorsal fin varies in colour from dark orange to brownish red. The oral cavity, gill cavity, and upper jaw membranes are reddish to orange, thus the common name. The juveniles have a wide white rear margin to the caudal fin and a thin white margin along the soft-rayed portion of the dorsal fin. The maximum total length is 60 centimetres (24 in).

== Distribution ==
The redmouth grouper has an Indo-West Pacific distribution which extends from the Red Sea and Persian Gulf south along the East African court to South Africa, east to the Phoenix Islands in Kiribati, and north to southern Honshu, Japan.

In Australia it has been recorded from Rowley Shoals and the Kimberley region in Western Australia, Ashmore Reef, the Timor Sea, and the northern Great Barrier Reef as far south as Wheeler Reef in Queensland. This species is likely found around all the tropical islands of the Indian Ocean, although it has not been reported from Mauritius yet. It has been recorded from Europa Island in the Mozambique Channel.

== Biology and habitat ==
The redmouth grouper is a tropical fish which occurs in coastal reefs and lagoons, it has been recorded over silt substrates as well as in and around caves and crevices in reefs. It has a depth range of 1 to 60 metres (3.3 to 196.9 ft).

The small juveniles mimic angelfish of the genus Centropyge. This is a predatory species which mainly feeds on small fishes, including Pempheris spp., but also on stomatopods and crustaceans. The redmouth grouper spawns throughout the year and attains sexual maturity at around 35 centimetres (14 in) in standard length, although they have not been reported to form spawning aggregations.

== Uses ==
The redmouth grouper is probably caught by line and spear fisheries throughout its range, although it is not a target species and is normally considered to be of low value. It has been recorded being taken by line fisheries in the Solomon Islands, Micronesia, the Maldives, India and Australia. It is rarely sold in markets, although it has been stated that it is an important component of the fresh-chilled grouper fishery in the Maldives.
