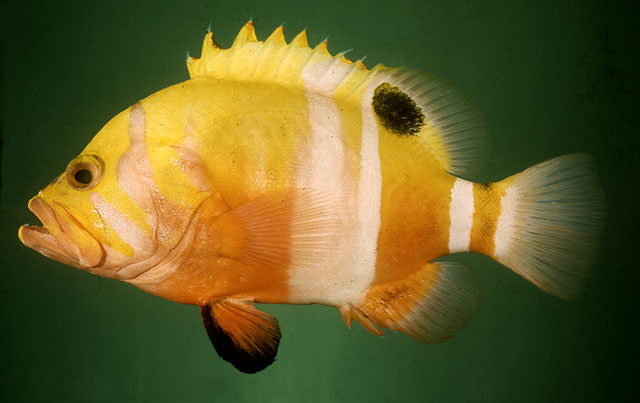

Conservation status
- Least Concern (IUCN 3.1)

Scientific classification
- Kingdom: Animalia
- Phylum: Chordata
- Class: Actinopterygii
- Division: Teleostei
- Order: Perciformes
- Family: Epinephelidae
- Genus: Cephalopholis
- Species: C. igarashiensis

Binomial name
- Cephalopholis igarashiensis Katayama, 1957

Synonyms
- Cephalopholis swanius Tsai, 1960

= Cephalopholis igarashiensis =

Species of fish

Cephalopholis igarashiensis, commonly known as the garish hind, Neptune grouper, goldbar grouper, or Japanese cod, is a deepwater species of marine ray-finned fish, a grouper of the family Epinephelidae. It is found on coral reefs at depths of 80 to 250 m (260 to 820 ft) in the Indo-Pacific.

== Taxonomy ==
Cephalopholis igarashiensis was first formally described in 1957 by the Japanese ichthyologist Masao Katayama with the type locality given as Sumisu-tu in the Izu Islands of Japan.

== Distribution ==
Cephalopholis igarashiensis is found mainly in the Western Pacific Ocean where it is found as far north as Japan, east to Fiji and French Polynesia and south to Australia.

In Australia it has been reported from Scott Reef in Western Australia, east to the Arafura Sea off the Northern Territory. It is also found around Christmas Island in the Indian Ocean.

== Description ==
Cephalopholis igarashiensis has a deep body with the depth of the body being greater than the length of the head, the standard length is 2.0 to 2.4 times the depth of the body. The dorsal profile of the head is straight or marginally concave to beyond the eye while the nape is distinctly convex. The preopercle is rounded and the edges have fine serrations although those on the ventral margin are slightly less fine giving it a more irregular appearance but the serration remain enclosed within the skin. The dorsal fin contains 9 spines and 14 soft rays while the anal fin has 3 spines and 9 soft rays. The caudal fin rounded. The overall colour of this species is reddish-orange and it has seven wide, lemon-yellow bars on the upper flanks which reach onto the dorsal fin, and three wide yellow irregular oblique stripes on the head. The juveniles are yellower, darkening on the lower body, and they have several white bars on the body and a large black eyespot on the soft rayed part of the dorsal fin. They also have blackish pelvic fins, and a black area at the base of the anal fin. This species attains a maximum standard length of 43 centimetres (17 in)>, but a more common length is 25 cm (10 in).

== Habitat and biology ==
Cephalopholis igarashiensis is a demersal species of steep reef drop-offs, seamounts and offshore banks in deep waters at depths of 64 to 250 metres (210 to 820 ft). It feeds on fishes and crustaceans.

== Utilisation ==
The flamboyant red and yellow patterns of this species makes it an attractive species to keep in aquaria, however, the garish hind is naturally rare and it is extremely hard to take it up to the surface because the fish cannot adapt to the changing water pressure; so special decompression procedures are required to keep the fish alive. Consequently, this species is extremely expensive; a juvenile in Singapore sold for $8000 SGD($ 6300 USD).

This species is targeted in subsistence fisheries and as a gamefish. Fishermen in Okinawa call it the Indian Mibai because of its flamboyant patterns. Okinawa Churaumi Aquarium in Japan became the first aquarium to display this species in January 2009.
