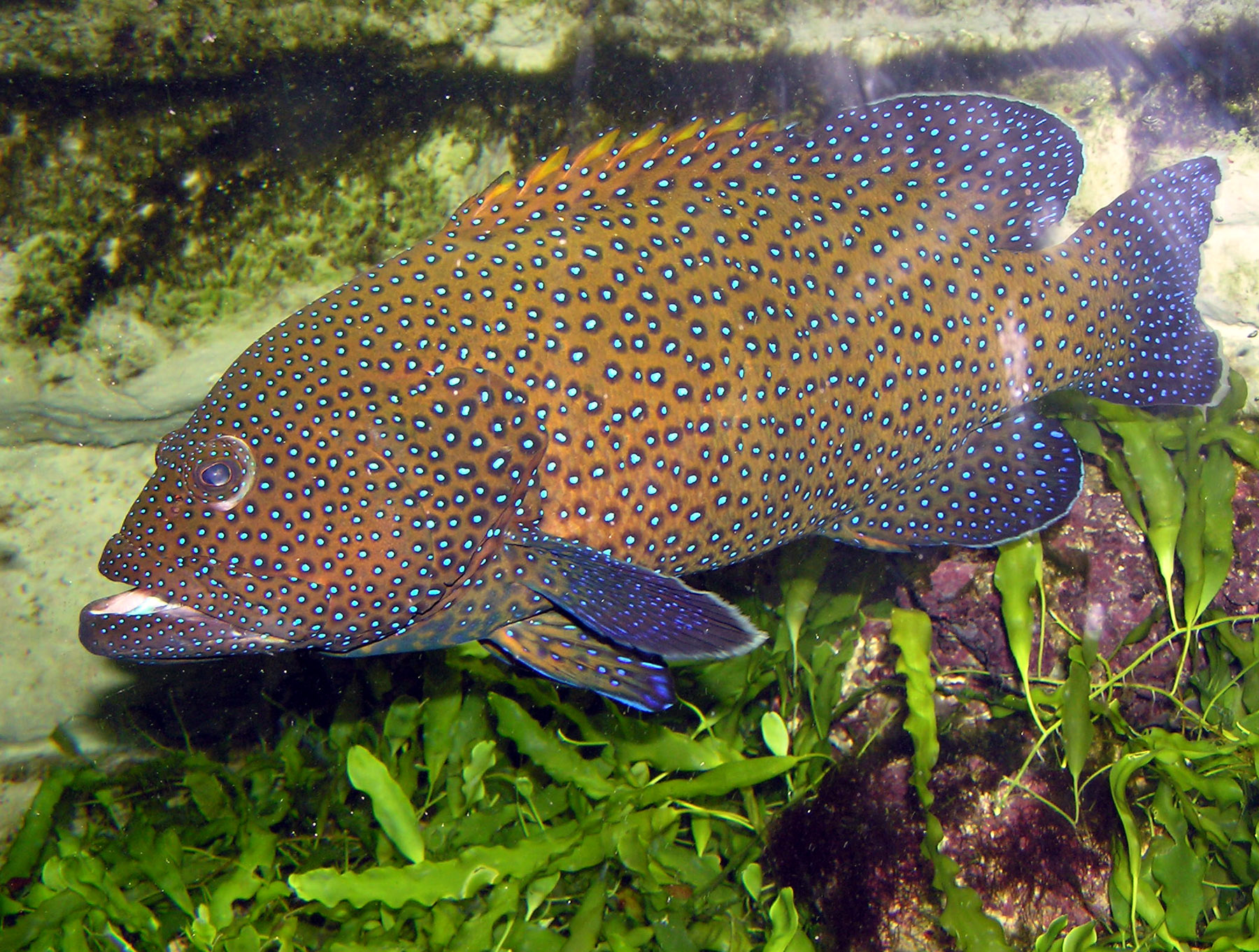

Conservation status
- Least Concern (IUCN 3.1)

Scientific classification
- Kingdom: Animalia
- Phylum: Chordata
- Class: Actinopterygii
- Division: Teleostei
- Order: Perciformes
- Family: Epinephelidae
- Genus: Cephalopholis
- Species: C. argus

Binomial name
- Cephalopholis argus (Schneider, 1801)

Synonyms
- List: Epinephelus argus (Schneider, 1801); Bodianus guttatus Bloch, 1790; Serranus guttatus (Bloch, 1790); Bodianus jacobevertsen Lacépède, 1802; Serranus myriaster Valenciennes, 1828; Serranus immunerur Montrouzier, 1857; Serranus thyrsites Saville-Kent, 1893

= Cephalopholis argus =

Species of fish

Cephalopholis argus, the peacock hind, roi, bluespotted grouper, and celestial grouper, is a species of marine ray-finned fish, a member of the subfamily Epinephelinae, the groupers, and part of the family Serranidae, which also includes the anthias and sea basses. They come from the Indo-Pacific and are variously a commercial gamefish, an invasive species, and occasionally an aquarium resident. Its species name comes from its resemblance to the "hundred staring eyes" of the monster Argus who had a hundred eyes and was the shepherd of the goddess Hera in Greek mythology.

== Distribution and habitat ==
The species is extremely widely distributed, occurring in warm waters from the Red Sea to South Africa and east to French Polynesia and the Pitcairn group. It is also present in northern Australia, Lord Howe Island, and Japan, and has been introduced to the Hawaiian Islands. It makes use of a variety of habitats but prefers the exposed fronts of reefs, at depths of up to 40 m.

== Description ==
This is a medium-sized fish that can reach a length of 60 centimeters (24 in). Small individuals are dark brown with hundreds of small, dark-edged iridescent blue spots. Larger specimens sometimes develop four to six lighter vertical bars on the back half of its body.

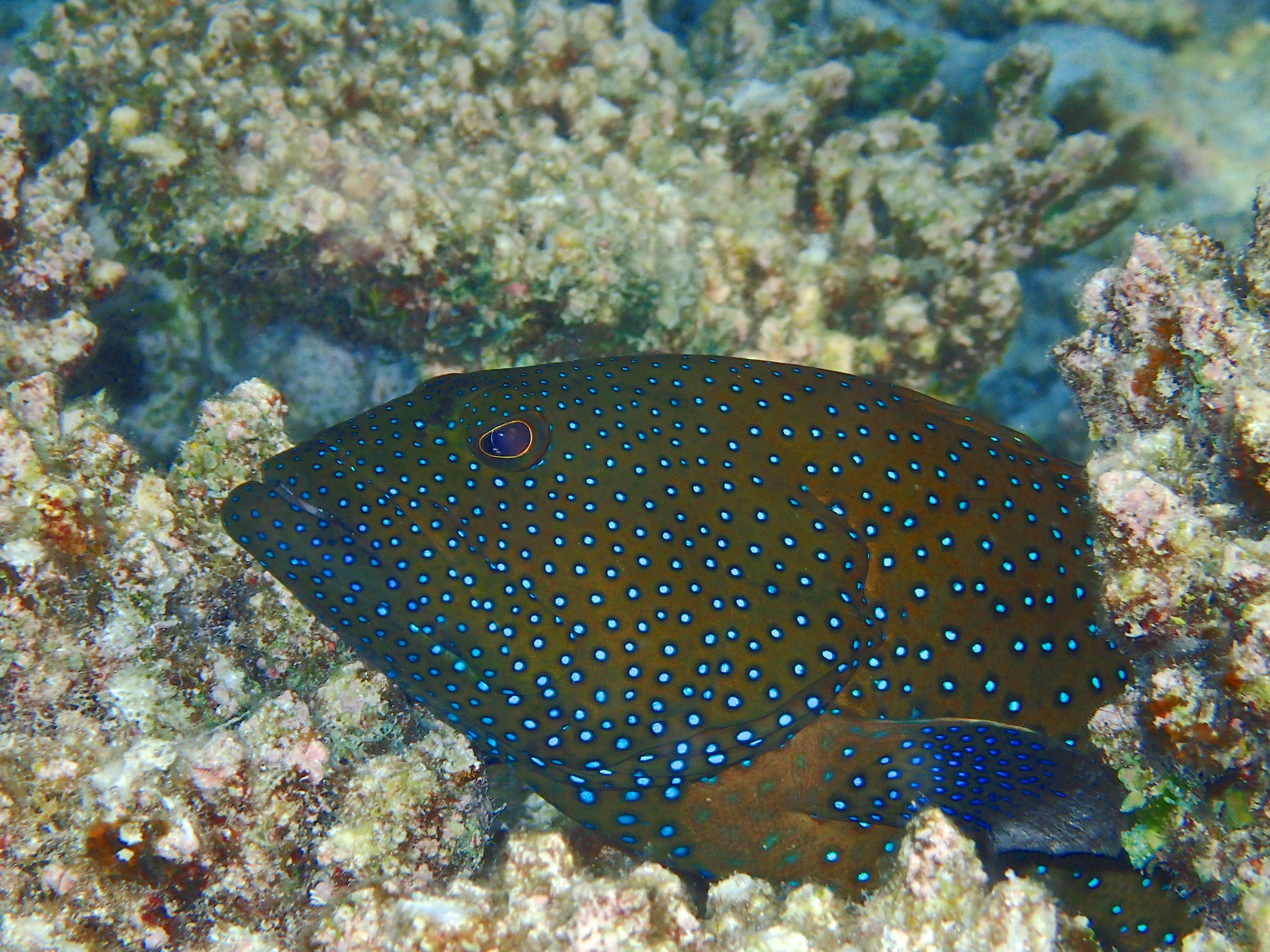
In the Maldives

== Ecology ==
=== Feeding ===
Hunting, they lie on the bottom and surge forward, preferring juvenile surgeonfish and crustaceans. Alternatively they may hover motionless in the water column before attacking.

This grouper may follow and cooperate with another predator species, such as an octopus or eel or camouflage themselves in a school of surgeonfish. Multiple individuals may cooperate to harass an eel to get it to flush prey for them.

In the Red Sea, they hunt in the morning and evening.

=== Behavior ===
In Madagascar

The species typically sit on a coral head, retreating when startled.

Red Sea males defend harems of 2–6 females in territories ranging up to .5 acres (0.20 ha). Each female defends part of the territory from the other females. The male visits each female daily, raising his dorsal fin to signal his approach. The females emerges from hiding, erecting her own dorsal fin and changing to a lighter color. They swim together, rubbing flanks before he departs until the next day.

Territorial disputes may involve "color fights" in which two males positioning themselves at right angles to each other. They then darken their color and repeatedly switch their bars from dark to light. The loser becomes pale and retreats. If the color fight ends in a draw, the two males may attack each other.

=== Reproduction ===
In Micronesia, spawning usually occurs territorially at dusk. During courtship, both sexes darken except for a white keyhole-shaped patch at the center of the body.

== Introduced status in Hawaii ==
In Hawaii

=== Impact ===
The peacock hind is an invasive species in Hawaii. Known in Hawaii as roi, the state introduced the species in the 1950s to enhance local fisheries. Hawaii's Division of Aquatic Resources (DAR) finds that roi have become the reefs' dominant predator. The Roi population there has increased 15 fold since the 1980s. From 1999 to 2005 there was a 23% increase in their population. Their biomass is now greater than that of all other reef fish predators combined.

These predators threaten native reef fish such as parrotfish and goatfish. A University of Hawaii study estimated that in a three-square-mile area off the Kona Coast of Hawaii Island, Roi eat 90 tonnes (89 long tons; 99 short tons) of reef fish annually— equivalent to 8.2 million fish.

Roi feed primarily on juvenile fish that have recruited the reef. The majority of their diet consists of parrotfish, which are crucial to the coral reef ecosystem by removing algal growth on coral colonies through feeding. Parrotfish also play a large role in the production of sand. Hawaii has the highest rate of endemism of its nearshore marine fish species at 24.3%. The lack of natural predators to control Roi populations along with their high efficiency is a major threat to the unique fish fauna found in Hawaii. Ichthyologist Dr. Jack Randall describes the impact of Roi in Hawaii as greater than the impact of fishing and aquarium collection combined. Estimates of consumption on the Kona coast suggest that Roi consume 11% of the total reef fish biomass and 72% of the total number of fish.

=== Diet ===
Analysis of stomach contents of Hawaiian roi found that diets consist of 97.7% fish and 2.3% crustaceans. Of the fish eaten, there were 27.1% Scaridae (Parrotfish), 18.7% Acanthuridae (Surgeonfish), 17.6% Squirrelfish, 13.7% Monacanthidae (Filefish), 9.3% Priacanthidae (Bigeyes), 4.3% Chaetodontidae (Butterflyfish), 2.8% Aulostomidae (Trumpetfishes), and 6.9% other consisting of 9 families. Roi are estimated to eat 0.8% of their body weight each day.

=== Ciguatera ===
Although it is prized as delicious eating in other Pacific regions, in Hawaii's waters roi often contain the ciguatera toxin, which causes serious illness. A 2007 study found that 18.2% of Roi sampled from Oahu and Hawaii islands had toxins above levels safe for consumption. Neither the size of the fish or the location from which it was harvested are reliable predictors of toxicity. There is currently no commercially available testing kit. Because of the toxicity issues, Roi does not have a functional fishery, with just an average of $1000 per year in sales.

=== Control ===
No official fishery for the species exists in Hawaii, due to the serious risk of ciguatera poisoning. On Maui, spearfishers participate in "Roi Roundup" tournaments that target these problematic fish, attempting to reduce their numbers and impact. This practice has spread to other islands, where there are similar tournaments that target roi and other invasive fish species. These events not only reduce the roi population, but also work to boost public awareness about this issue.

== Conservation ==
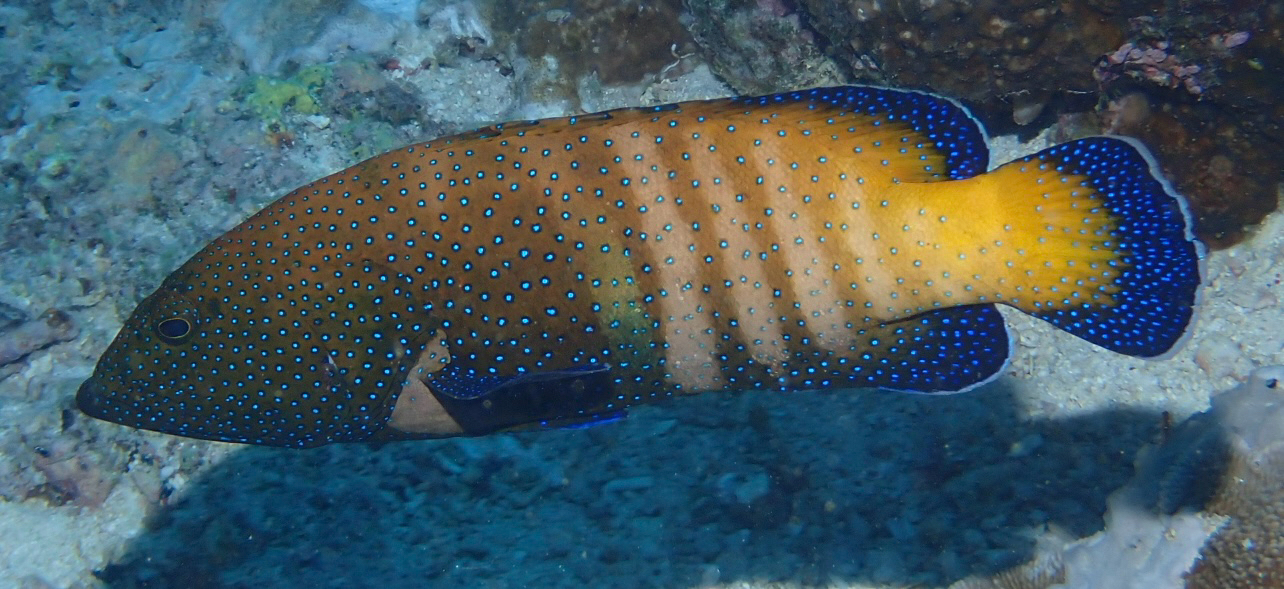
In Malaysia

The species is classified as Least Concern by the IUCN. and is widespread and common throughout its range. It is exploited in commercial and recreational fisheries and for the aquarium trade.
