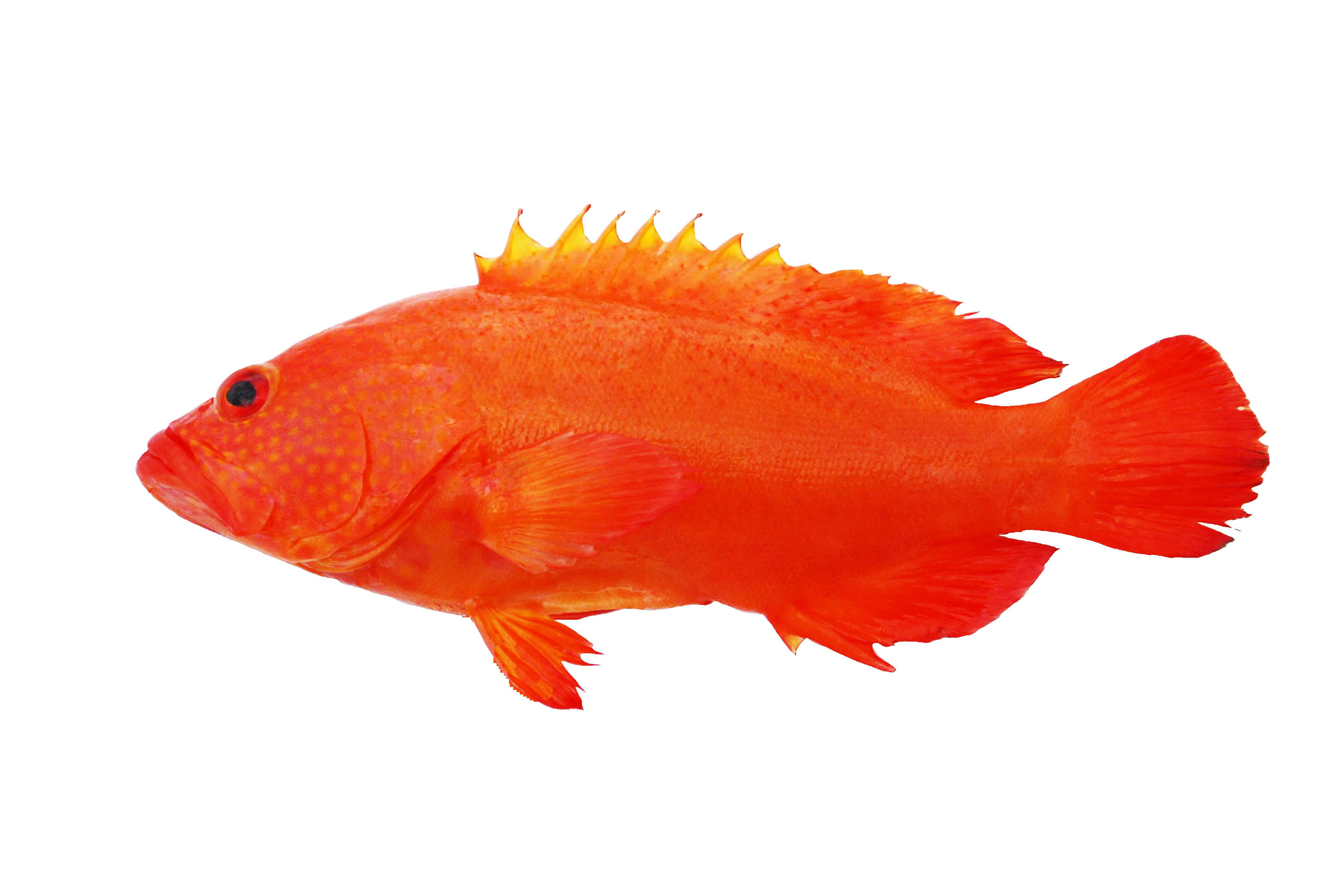

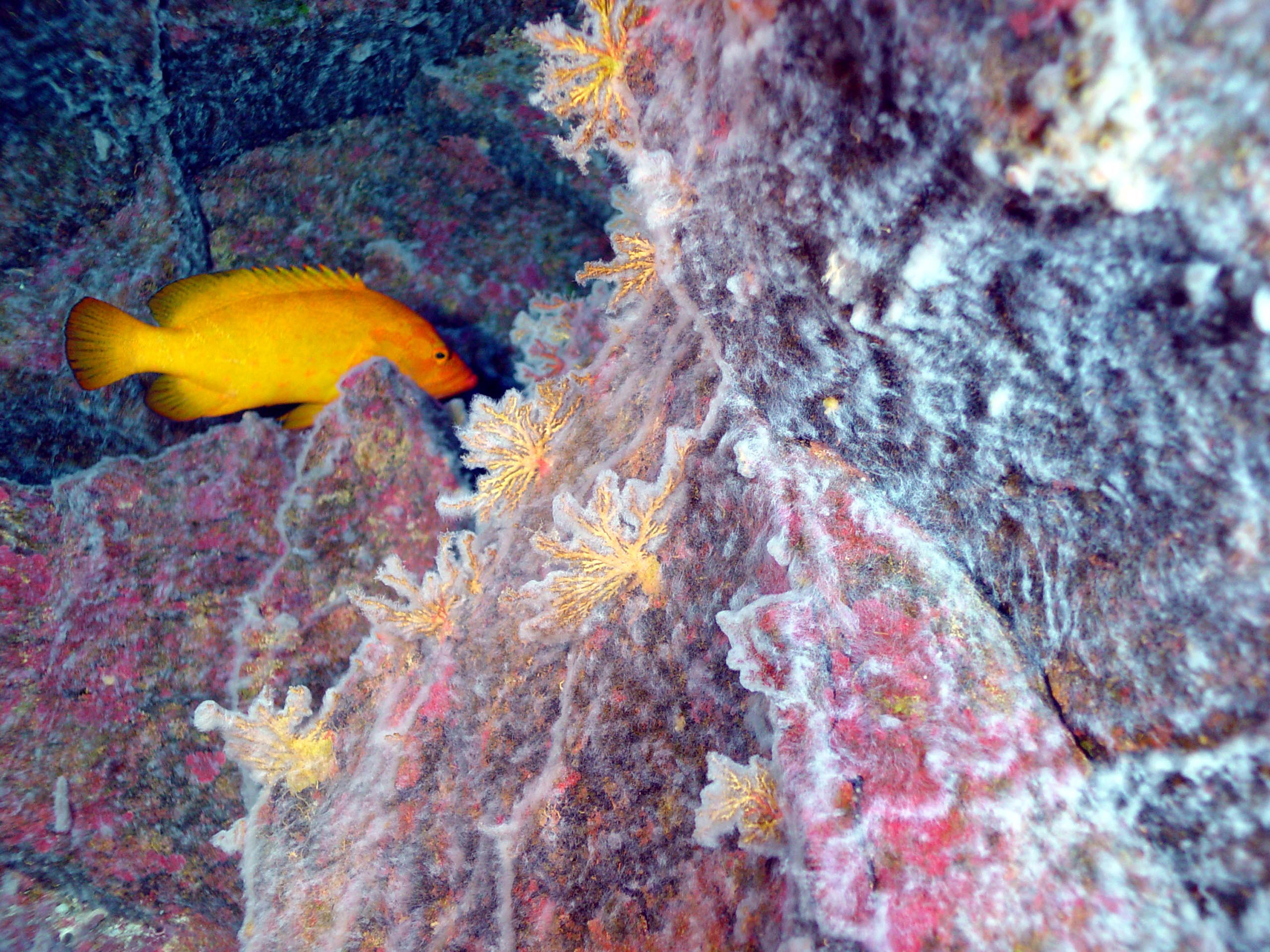

Scientific classification
- Kingdom: Animalia
- Phylum: Chordata
- Class: Actinopterygii
- Order: Perciformes
- Family: Epinephelidae
- Genus: Cephalopholis
- Species: C. aurantia

Binomial name
- Cephalopholis aurantia (Valenciennes, 1828)

Synonyms
- Serranus analis Valenciennes in Cuvier & Valenciennes, 1828; Serranus aurantius Valenciennes in Cuvier & Valenciennes, 1828; Serranus rufus Hombron & Jacquinot in Jacquinot & Guichenot, 1853; Epinephelus miltostigma Bleeker, 1873; Bodianus indelebilis Fowler, 1904; Cephalopholis obtusauris Evermann & Seale, 1907

= Cephalopholis aurantia =

Species of fish

Cephalopholis aurantia, the golden hind, is a species of marine ray-finned fish, a grouper from the subfamily Epinephelinae. This rarely encountered species lives on steep seaward reefs of the Indo-Pacific.
