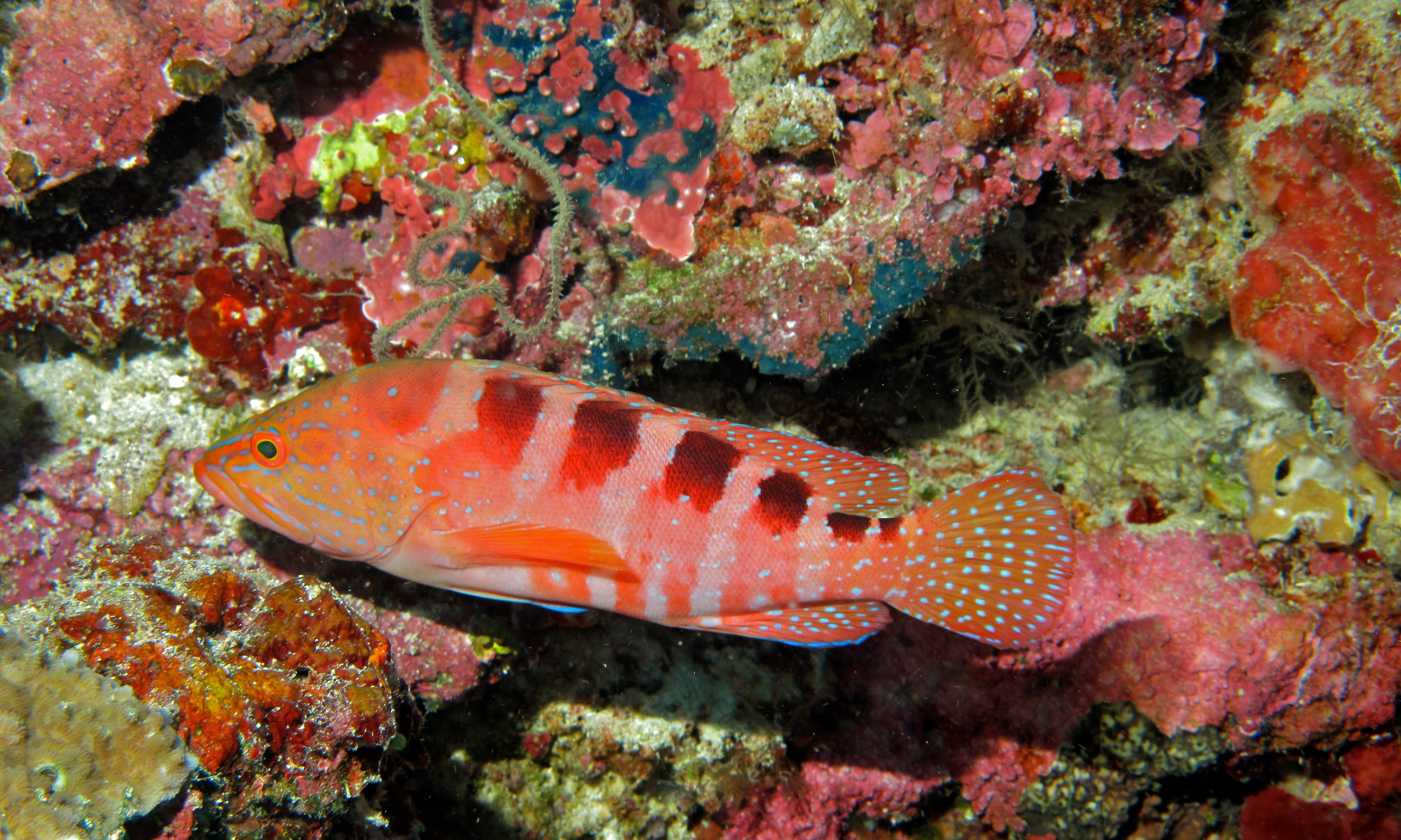
- In Indonesia

Conservation status
- Least Concern (IUCN 3.1)

Scientific classification
- Kingdom: Animalia
- Phylum: Chordata
- Class: Actinopterygii
- Division: Teleostei
- Order: Perciformes
- Family: Epinephelidae
- Genus: Cephalopholis
- Species: C. sexmaculata

Binomial name
- Cephalopholis sexmaculata (Rüppell, 1830)

Synonyms
- List: Serranus sexmaculatus Rüppell, 1830; Epinephelus sexmaculatus (Rüppell, 1830); Serranus zanana Valenciennes, 1828; Cephalopholis coatesi Whitley, 1937; Cephalopholis gibbus Fourmanoir, 1955

= Cephalopholis sexmaculata =

Species of fish

Cephalopholis sexmaculata, sixblotch hind, freckled cod, freckled rock-cod, sixband cod, six-banded rockcod, sixband rockcod or sixspot rockcod is a species of marine ray-finned fish, a grouper of the family Epinephelidae. This fish occurs throughout the Indo-Pacific.

== Taxonomy ==
Cephalopholis sexmaculata was first formally described as Serranus sexmaculatus in 1830 by the German naturalist and explorer Wilhelm Peter Eduard Simon Rüppell (1794–1884) with the type locality given as the Red Sea.

== Distribution ==
Cephalopholis sexmaculata has an Indo-Pacific distribution. It occurs in the Red Sea to South Africa east to French Polynesia, as far north as the Ryukyu Islands in southern Japan and south to northern Australia. It has not been recorded from the Indian subcontinent, Gulf of Oman or the Persian Gulf.

== Description ==
In the Philippines

Cephalopholis sexmaculata has been recorded growing up to a total length of 50 centimetres (20 in). It has a body which is 2.5 to 3 times as long as it is deep using standard length. Larger fish, longer than 30 centimetres (12 in) show a concave dorsal profile of the head above the eyes. It has a rounded, finely serrated preopercle although these serrations are tiny in adult fish. The dorsal fin contains 9 spines and 14–16 soft rays while the rounded anal fin has 3 spines and 9 soft rays. The caudal fin is rounded and the tips of the pelvic fins normally fall short of the anus. There are between 49 and 54 scales in the lateral line.

At the Great Barrier Reef

The body has a background colour of orange-red, and there is a sparse scattering of small blue spots sparsely which becomes denser on the head and the dorsal, anal and caudal fins. There are also elongated blue spots and bars on the head, The body is marked with 4 dark vertical bars, although these are sometimes very faint, along the flanks. The bars merge on the back with blackish blotches found at the base of the dorsal fin and which extend onto the fin. A further 2 smaller dark bars are found on the caudal peduncle. The gaps between these bars is sometimes rather pale and pectoral fins are orange-red in colour.

== Habitat and biology ==
In Indonesia

Cephalopholis sexmaculata occur on diverse coastal to outer reefs, as adults, normally along deep walls with caves which have a varied and abundant invertebrate growth of organisms like large sponges and soft corals. They may be solitary or be encountered in small groups. At night they are active in deeper water but move to shallower water during the day. They are secretive in their habits. They frequently associate with the cleaner shrimp Periclimenes elegans. It can be found at depths from 6 to 150 metres (20 to 492 ft). It feeds mainly on fishes.

== Utilisation ==
Cephalopholis sexmaculata is targeted by commercial fisheries using hook and line, traps and spears.
