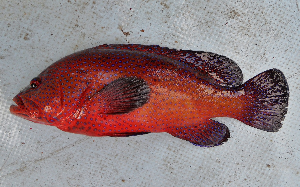

Conservation status
- Least Concern (IUCN 3.1)

Scientific classification
- Kingdom: Animalia
- Phylum: Chordata
- Class: Actinopterygii
- Division: Teleostei
- Order: Perciformes
- Family: Epinephelidae
- Genus: Cephalopholis
- Species: C. taeniops

Binomial name
- Cephalopholis taeniops (Valenciennes, 1828)

Synonyms
- List: Serranus taeniops Valenciennes, 1828; Bodianus taeniops (Valenciennes, 1828); Epinephelus taeniops (Valenciennes, 1828); Bodianus maculatus Bowdich, 1825

= Cephalopholis taeniops =

Species of fish

Cephalopholis taeniops, the African hind, bluespotted sea bass or spotted grouper, is a species of marine ray-finned fish, a grouper of the family Epinephelidae. It is found in the eastern Atlantic Ocean. This species occasionally makes its way into the aquarium trade and is a target for local fisheries.

== Taxonomy ==
Cephalopholis taeniops was first formally described as Serranus taeniops in 1828 by the French zoologist Achille Valenciennes (1794–1865) with the type locality given as the Cape Verde Islands.

== Distribution ==
Cephalopholis taeniops is found in the eastern Atlantic Ocean along the western coast of Africa from Morocco to Angola. It is also found around the Cape Verde Islands and the islands in the Gulf of Guinea.

In the 21st century, it has been also been recorded in the Mediterranean Sea. It has also been recorded around the Canary Islands where it is thought to have been introduced in ballast water discharged by oil platforms from West Africa.

== Description ==
Cephalopholis taeniops attains a maximum total length of 70 centimetres (28 in), although they are more common at around 40 centimetres (16 in). There are 9 spines and 15-16 soft rays in the dorsal fin while the anal fin has 3 spies and 9–10 soft rays. There are 68–72 scales in the lateral line, the pectoral fins are longer than the pelvic fins and the caudal fin is rounded.

It has a basic colour of reddish orange with the head and body covered with small blue spots as are the dorsal fin, anal fin and caudal fin. The fins are blackish towards the margins while the soft-rayed part of the dorsal and anal fins and the caudal fin have a narrow bluish margin. A horizontal blue line runs immediately below the eye. A much rarer black variety also displays blue spots

At Cabo Verde

At Cabo Verde

At Cabo Verde

== Habitat and biology ==
Cephalopholis taeniops is a demersal species which can be found in shallow rocky reefs and on sandy bottoms. It is a diandric protogynous hermaphrodite. Some of the males do not necessarily have a functional female stage and may develop into males from sexually immature females. The females reach sexual maturity when they attain a total length of 18 centimetres (7.1 in).

== Utilisation ==
This species is important for commercial fisheries in Cape Verde as it is deeply ingrained in traditional Cape Verdean cuisine most notably, stews. It is also caught on a small scale in São Tomé and Príncipe but is not generally exploited elsewhere in its range. It has been recorded in the aquarium trade.
