= Cephalopholis leopardus =

- In Indonesia

Conservation status
- Least Concern (IUCN 3.1)

Scientific classification
- Kingdom: Animalia
- Phylum: Chordata
- Class: Actinopterygii
- Division: Teleostei
- Order: Perciformes
- Family: Epinephelidae
- Genus: Cephalopholis
- Species: C. leopardus

Binomial name
- Cephalopholis leopardus (Lacépède, 1801)

Synonyms
- List: Labrus leopardus Lacepède, 1801; Cephalopholis leoparda (Lacepède, 1801); Epinephelus leopardus (Lacepède, 1801); Serranus leopardus (Lacepède, 1801); Serranus spilurus Valenciennes, 1833; Serranus homfrayi Day, 1871; Epinephelus urodelops Schultz, 1943

Species of fish

Cephalopholis leopardus, also known as the Leopard grouper or Leopard hind, is a species of marine ray-finned fish, a grouper from the subfamily Epinephelinae which is in the family Serranidae which also includes the anthias and sea basses. It is found in the Indo-Pacific.

== Distribution & habitat ==
It is widely distributed throughout the tropical waters of the Indian Ocean, Red Sea, Persian Gulf and South Africa excluded, to the central island of the Pacific Ocean.

Like many of the groupers, Cephalopholis leopardus lives in rich clear waters close to coral or rocky reefs from the surface until 40 metres (130 ft) depth with an average depth range from 3 to 20 metres (66 ft).

== Description ==
In Kenya

The Leopard grouper is a small to medium-sized fish which grows up to 24 cm. The body is fusiform or spindle-shaped and compressed laterally. The caudal fin is rounded. The mouth is big and has a superior position. The body background coloration is light brown, reddish or light green-gray. On the top part of the body, blotches form marbling like pattern. The low part is spotted. The front snout is covered with small red or dark dots. The leopard grouper can easily be confused with Cephalopholis urodeta but it differs mainly from this latter by two dark blotches located on the top part of its caudal peduncle. The caudal fin is distinguished by two red to dark lines forming a "V" and another black line parallel to the top line of the "V".

== Feeding ==
Cephalopholis leopardus is carnivorous and its diet consists mainly in small fishes and crustaceans, it's an ambush predator.

== Behavior ==
The leopard grouper is solitary, territorial, demersal and has a nocturnal and/or a diurnal activity which can be maximal at sunrise and/or at sunset. It is protogynous hermaphrodite, which means the female can change sex to become male during its life.

== Gallery ==
In the Maldives

In Kenya
