= Cephalopholis boenak =

- In Thailand

Conservation status
- Least Concern (IUCN 3.1)

Scientific classification
- Kingdom: Animalia
- Phylum: Chordata
- Class: Actinopterygii
- Division: Teleostei
- Order: Perciformes
- Family: Epinephelidae
- Genus: Cephalopholis
- Species: C. boenak

Binomial name
- Cephalopholis boenak (Bloch, 1790)

Synonyms
- List: Bodianus boenak Bloch, 1790; Serranus boenak (Bloch, 1790); Serranus pachycentron Valenciennes, 1828; Cephalopholis pachycentron (Valenciennes, 1828); Epinephelus pachycentron (Valenciennes, 1828); Serranus boelang Valenciennes, 1828; Epinephelus boelang (Valenciennes, 1828); Serranus stigmapomus Richardson, 1846; Serranus nigrofasciatus Hombron & Jacquinot, 1853

Species of fish

Cephalopholis boenak, the chocolate hind, brownbarred rockcod, brown-banded cod or brown-banded rockcod, is a species of marine ray-finned fish, a grouper from the subfamily Epinephelinae which is in the family Serranidae which also includes the anthias and sea basses. It is associated with reefs over a wide Indo-Pacific distribution. It is an important species for commercial fisheries in some parts of its range.

== Distribution ==
Cephalopholis boenak has a wide distribution in the Indian Ocean and the Western Pacific Ocean from the eastern coast of Africa where it occurs from Kenya south to southern Mozambique along the southern Asian coast and into the Pacific where it occurs north as far as the Ryukyu Islands and east to New Caledonia. In Australia it has been recorded along the northern coast from Coral Bay, Western Australia to Moreton Bay in Queensland.

== Description ==
Cephalopholis boenak has a body which has a standard length which is 2.6–3.1 times its depth and with a head that is around a fifth of the standard length. Its dorsal fin contains 9 spines and 15–17 soft rays while the anal fin has 3 spines and 8 soft rays. The preopercle is rounded with fine serrations but no enlarged spines at its angle and with a flesh lower margin. The body, including the abdomen, is covered in ctenoid scales which is a characteristic of this species. The overall colour is brownish to greenish-grey and there are normally 7–8 dark vertical bars on the flanks. The dorsal fin has a wide dark submarginal band and a thin white margin, these are also present on the anal fins, and the upper and lower lobes of the caudal fin. There is a blackish spot on the upper margin of the gill cover. The juveniles have a yellowish on the posterior portion of their body and are marked with a white stripe which runs from the snout to the origin of the dorsal fin. It grows to a maximum total length of 30 centimetres (12 in).

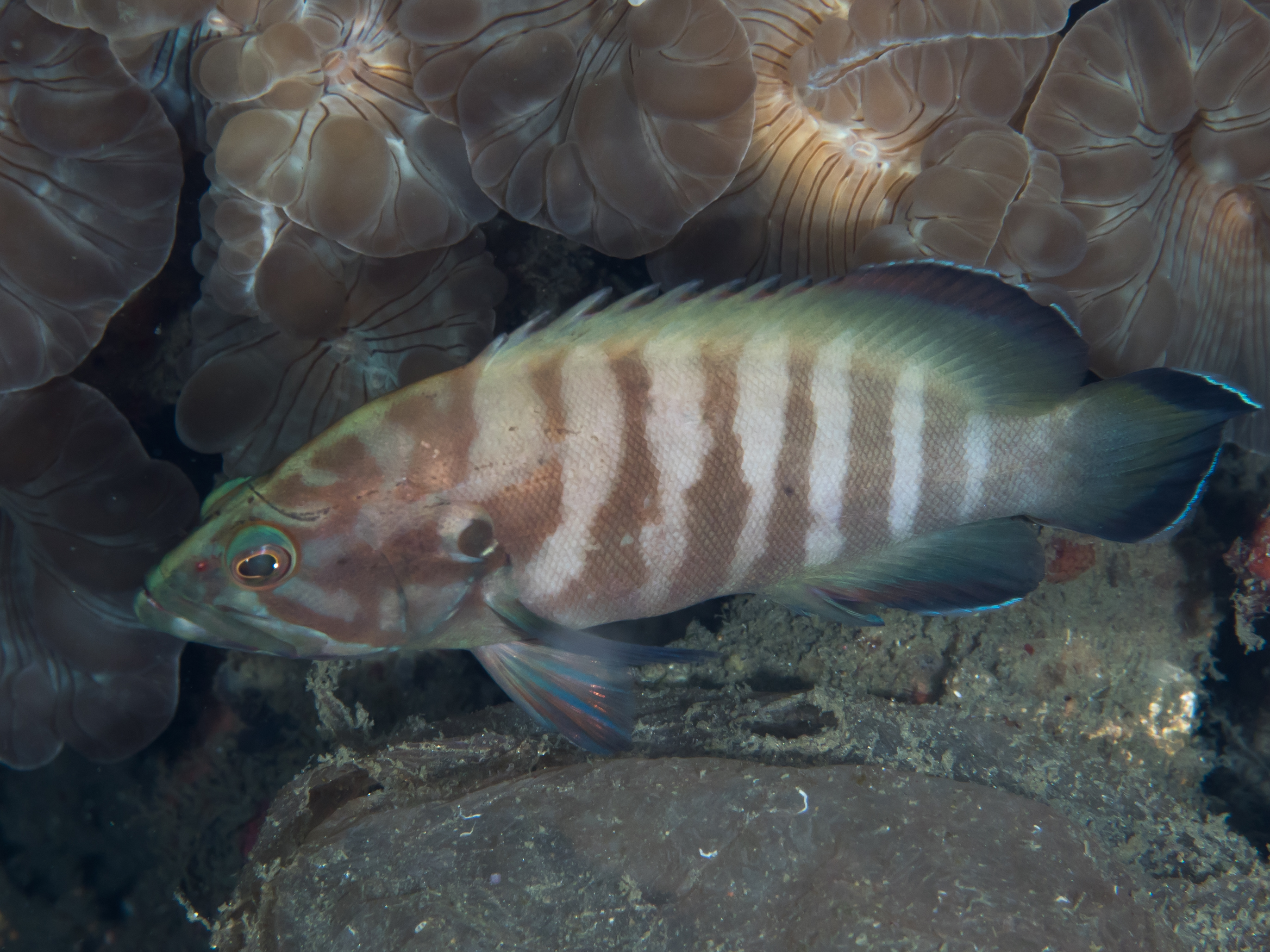
In Indonesia

== Habitat and biology ==
Cephalopholis boenak is mainly a coastal species which is found on silty, dead and living coral reefs as deep as 30 metres (98 ft). It is a carnivore which preys mainly on other fishes and on crustaceans. The chocolate hind is a protogynous hermaphrodite, they undergo a sex change from females to males, although some are born as males. They occur in relatively small social groups which comprise a single male, one or two smaller females, and a variable number of sexually inactive individuals. These sexually inactive fish are sexually inactive adults or juveniles. The males defend a territory from other males and the territory is much larger than the home ranges of the females. The males visit the females and other fish within their territory at specific locations, almost always using the same route. Courtship occurs in the late afternoons but breeding behaviour is not associated with any particular moon phase and can happen multiple times during the breeding season.

== Utilisation ==
Cephalopholis boenak is commercially fished for human consumption in many parts of its range. Hook-and-line, traps and trawling are the main methods used to catch them, although they are occasionally caught using gillnet and purse-seine. In Hong Kong it has increased in commercial importance as a result of the decline of larger-bodied species of grouper and the chocolate hind is now one of the more important species in the Hong Kong fish market. It is commonly landed by artisanal fishermen in southern Kenya. In Sri Lanka it is also harvested to be traded in the marine aquarium trade.

== Taxonomy ==
Cephalopholis boenak was first formally described as Bodianus boenak by the German naturalist Marcus Elieser Bloch (1723–1799) with the type locality given erroneously as Japan when it was actually Indonesia.
