= Cephalopholis urodeta =

- In Japan

Conservation status
- Least Concern (IUCN 3.1)

Scientific classification
- Kingdom: Animalia
- Phylum: Chordata
- Class: Actinopterygii
- Division: Teleostei
- Order: Perciformes
- Family: Epinephelidae
- Genus: Cephalopholis
- Species: C. urodeta

Binomial name
- Cephalopholis urodeta (Forster, 1801)

Synonyms
- List: Perca urodeta Forster, 1801; Serranus urodelus Valenciennes, 1828; Cephalopholis urodela (Valenciennes, 1828); Cephalopholis urodelus (Valenciennes, 1828); Epinephelus urodelus (Valenciennes, 1828); Serranus erythraeus Valenciennes, 1830; Epinephelus erythraeus (Valenciennes, 1830); Perca urodeta Forster in Lichtenstein, 1844; Epinephelus playfairi Bleeker, 1879; Serranus mars De Vis, 1884; Serranus mauritiiae Gudger, 1929

Species of fish

Cephalopholis urodeta, the darkfin hind, flagtail rockcod, chevron rockcod, duskyfin hind, duskyfin rockcod, flagtail grouper or V-tail grouper, is a species of marine ray-finned fish, a grouper of the family Epinephelidae. This fish occurs in the Western Pacific Ocean and the far eastern Indian Ocean.

== Taxonomy ==
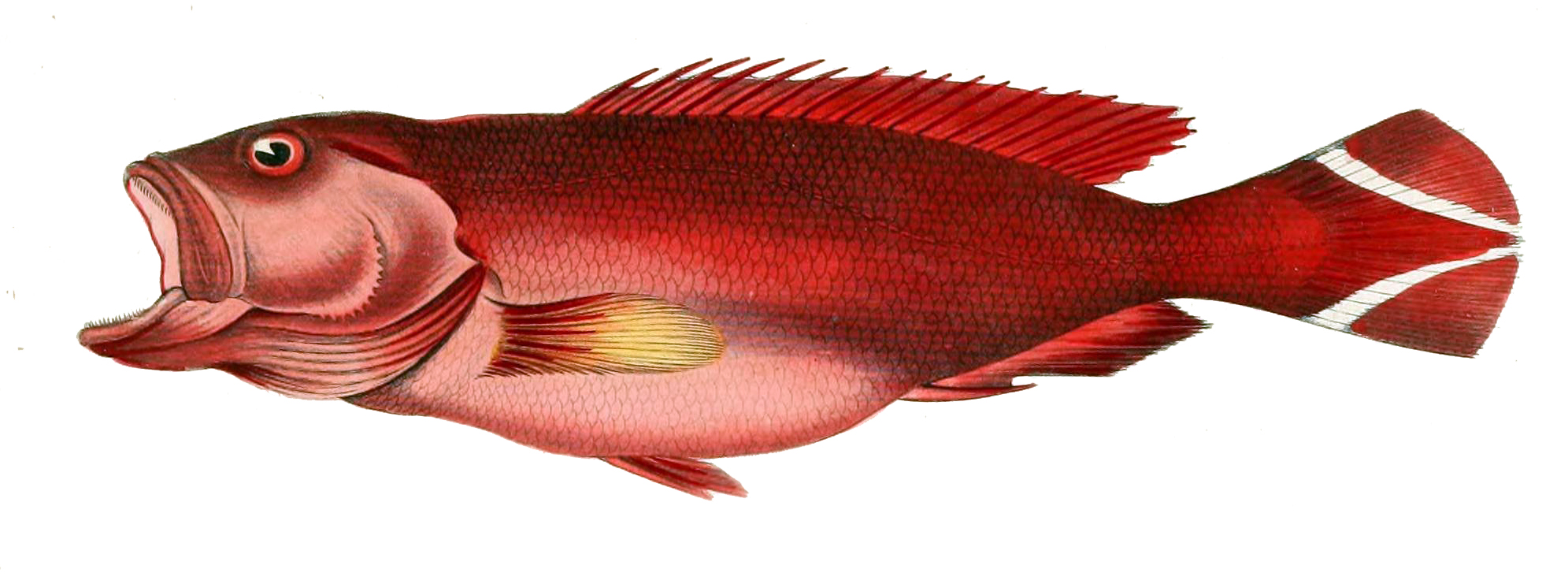
1856 illustration

This species was once regarded as widespread in the Indian Ocean, but nowadays the Indian Ocean form is regarded as Cephalopholis nigripinnis. The two species may hybridise at Christmas Island where individuals with appearances that are intermediate between the two species have been recorded.

== Distribution ==
Cephalopholis urodeta is found at Christmas Island in the eastern Indian Ocean but it is mainly a species of the Western Pacific Ocean. It extends as far north as Okinawa and the Ryukyu Islands of southern Japan and as far south as the southern Great Barrier Reef of Queensland in Australia. Its range extends east as far as French Polynesia and Pitcairn Island. It has also been recorded from Phoenix Islands, Jarvis Island, Palmyra Atoll, and Kingman Reef, as well as Brunei.

In 1958 over 1,800 specimens of C. urodeta sourced in the South Pacific were released near Oahu in Hawaii but they failed to become established.

== Description ==
In Indonesia

In Indonesia

In Japan

Cephalopholis urodeta has been recorded growing up to a total length of 28 cm (11 in). It has a body which is less deep than the head is long with the body being around a third as deep as the standard length. The profile between the eyes is convex and the rounded preopercle has a serrated edge and a fleshy lower edge. The maxilla extends beyond the eye. The dorsal fin has 9 spines and 14–16 soft rays while the anal fin has 3 spines and 8–9 soft rays. The caudal fin is rounded and the pelvic fins do not extend to the anus.

The overall colour of this fish is reddish-brown to pale greyish-brown, darkening towards the tail, with obvious whitish to pale blue diagonal lines across both lobes of the caudal fin. They frequently show six faint bars along the flanks, these fork towards the abdomen, and there are small orange-red spots on the head and nape, as well as a pair of dark spots near the tip of the lower lip. The pectoral fin are yellowish and there is normally a large reddish to brownish spot on the edge of the gill cover.

== Habitat and biology ==
Cephalopholis urodeta is found in clear, shallow waters in the outer areas of reefs, in lagoons, behind the reef and over the top of reefs. They are solitary and prefer healthy coral reefs in areas of shallow water where they feed on largely on small fishes, which make up 68% of its diet, and crustaceans. It occurs down to depths of 60 metres (200 ft). A single male will have a territory which includes that of up to six females. The male will court the females in the afternoons.

== Utilisation ==
Cephalopholis urodeta is too small to be of interest to commercial fisheries, although it is taken by subsistence fishermen. It sometimes appears in the aquarium trade.
