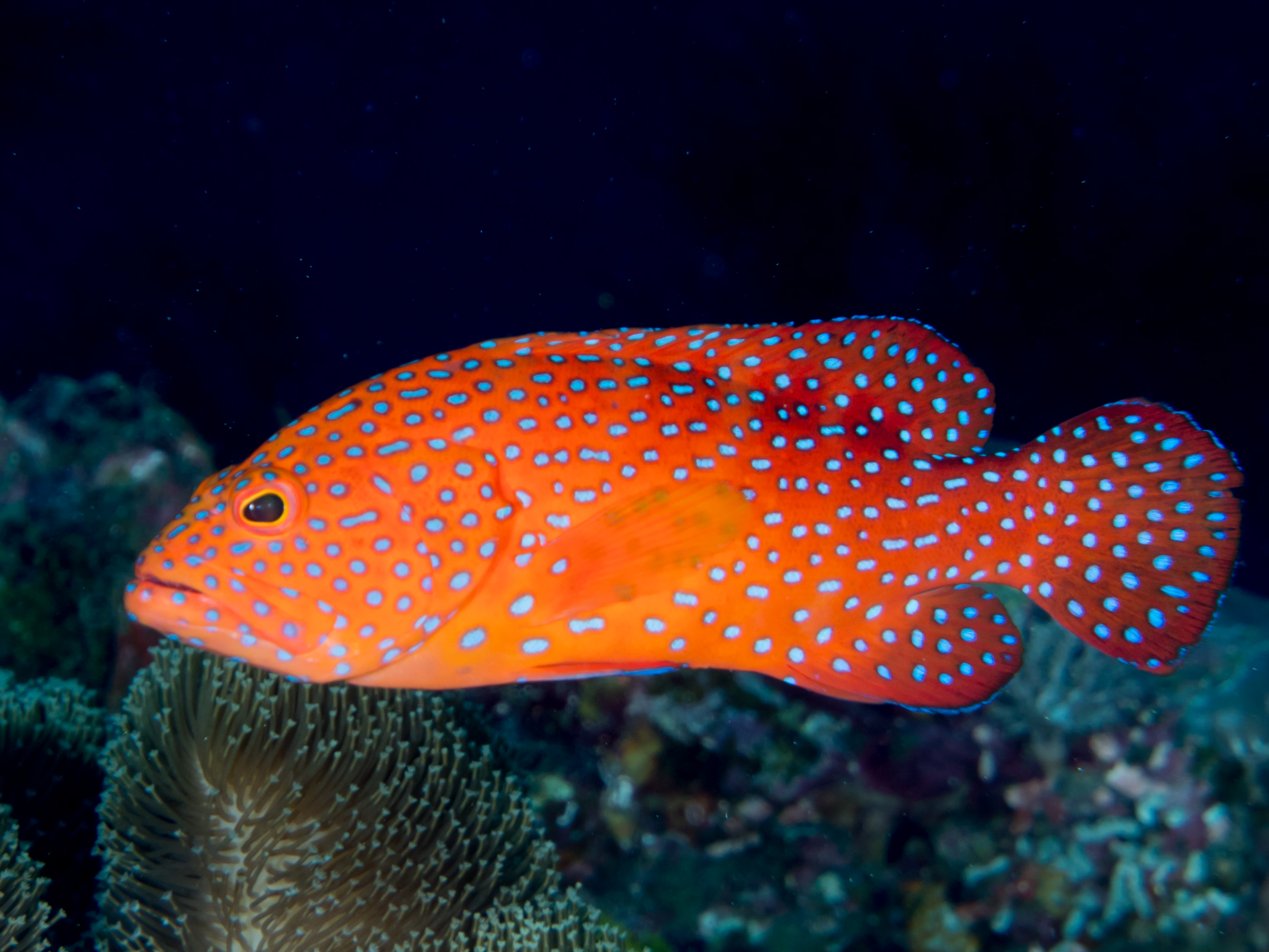
- In Indonesia

Conservation status
- Least Concern (IUCN 3.1)

Scientific classification
- Kingdom: Animalia
- Phylum: Chordata
- Class: Actinopterygii
- Division: Teleostei
- Order: Perciformes
- Family: Epinephelidae
- Genus: Cephalopholis
- Species: C. miniata

Binomial name
- Cephalopholis miniata (Forsskål, 1775)

Synonyms
- List: Perca miniata Forsskål, 1775; Epinephelus miniatus (Forsskål, 1775); Serranus miniatus (Forsskål, 1775); Pomacentrus burdi Lacépède, 1802; Serranus cyanostigmatoides Bleeker, 1849; Serranus perguttatus De Vis, 1884; Cephalopholis maculatus Seale & B.A. Bean, 1907; Cephalopholis formosanus Tanaka, 1911; Cephalopholis boninius Jordan & Thompson, 1914

= Coral grouper =

Species of fish

Cephalopholis miniata, commonly known as the coral grouper, coral hind, coral rock cod, coral cod, coral trout, round-tailed trout or vermillion seabass is a species of marine ray-finned fish, a grouper of the family Epinephelidae. It is associated with coral reefs and occurs in the Indo-Pacific.

== Taxonomy ==
Cephalopholis miniata was first formally described as Perca miniata by the Swedish explorer, orientalist and naturalist Peter Forsskål (1732-1763) with the type locality given as Jeddah.

== Distribution ==
Cephalopholis miniata has a wide Indo-Pacific distribution from eastern coast of Africa where it occurs from the Red Sea to Durban in South Africa and east through the Indian Ocean and into the Pacific as far as the Line Islands. It occurs as far north as southern Japan and south to northern Australia. It occurs in most islands of the Indian Ocean and the west-central Pacific but it has not been recorded from the Persian Gulf and the Gulf of Oman. There are also records from southwestern India and the Andaman Sea coasts of Thailand.

In Australia it is found from the Houtman Abrolhos in Western Australia to Wigram Island, Northern Territory and the northern Great Barrier Reef to Moreton Bay in Queensland, it is also found at Middleton Reef and Elizabeth Reef in the Coral Sea and Lord Howe Island in the Tasman Sea.

== Description ==
In the Red Sea

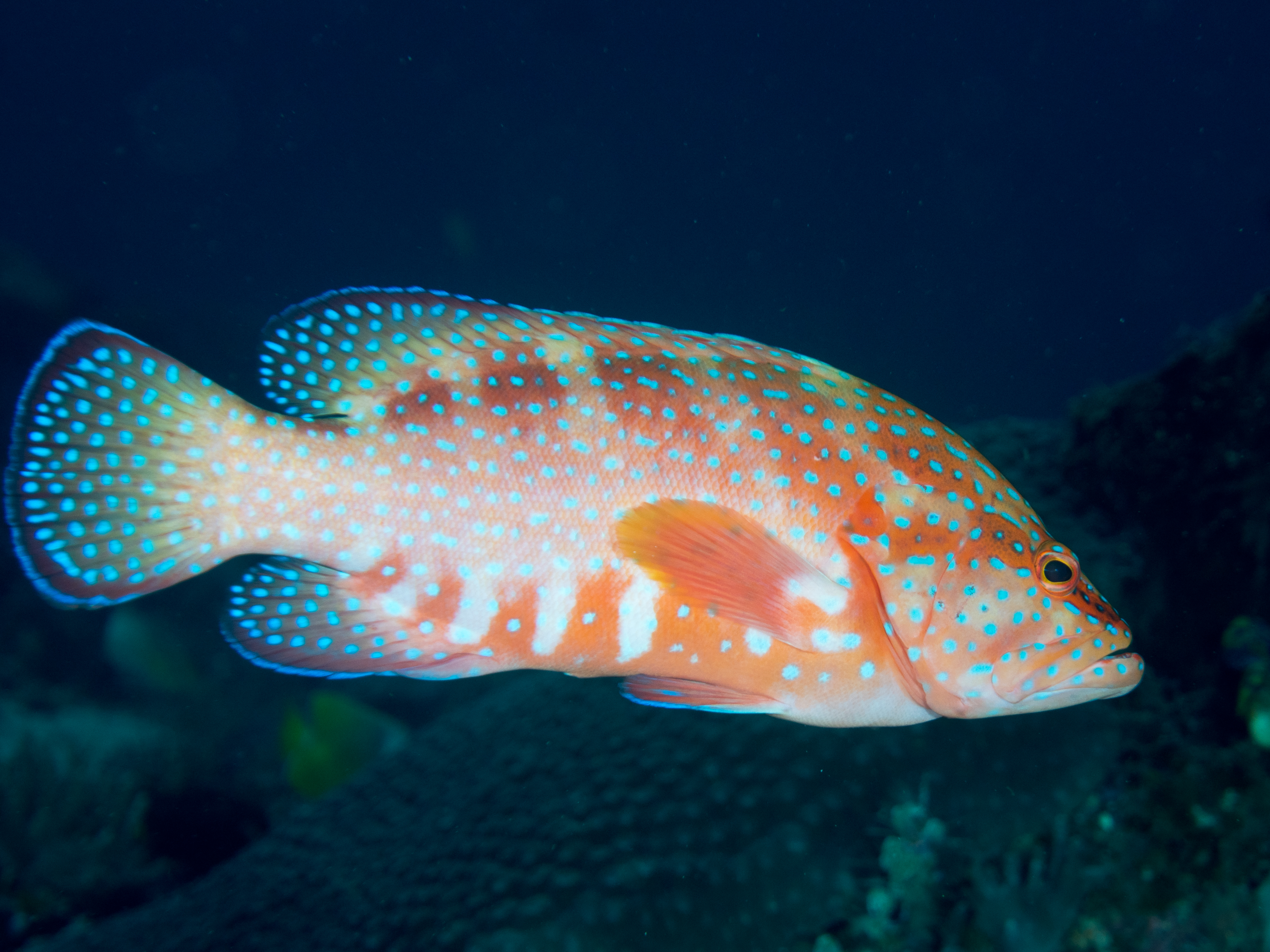
In Indonesia

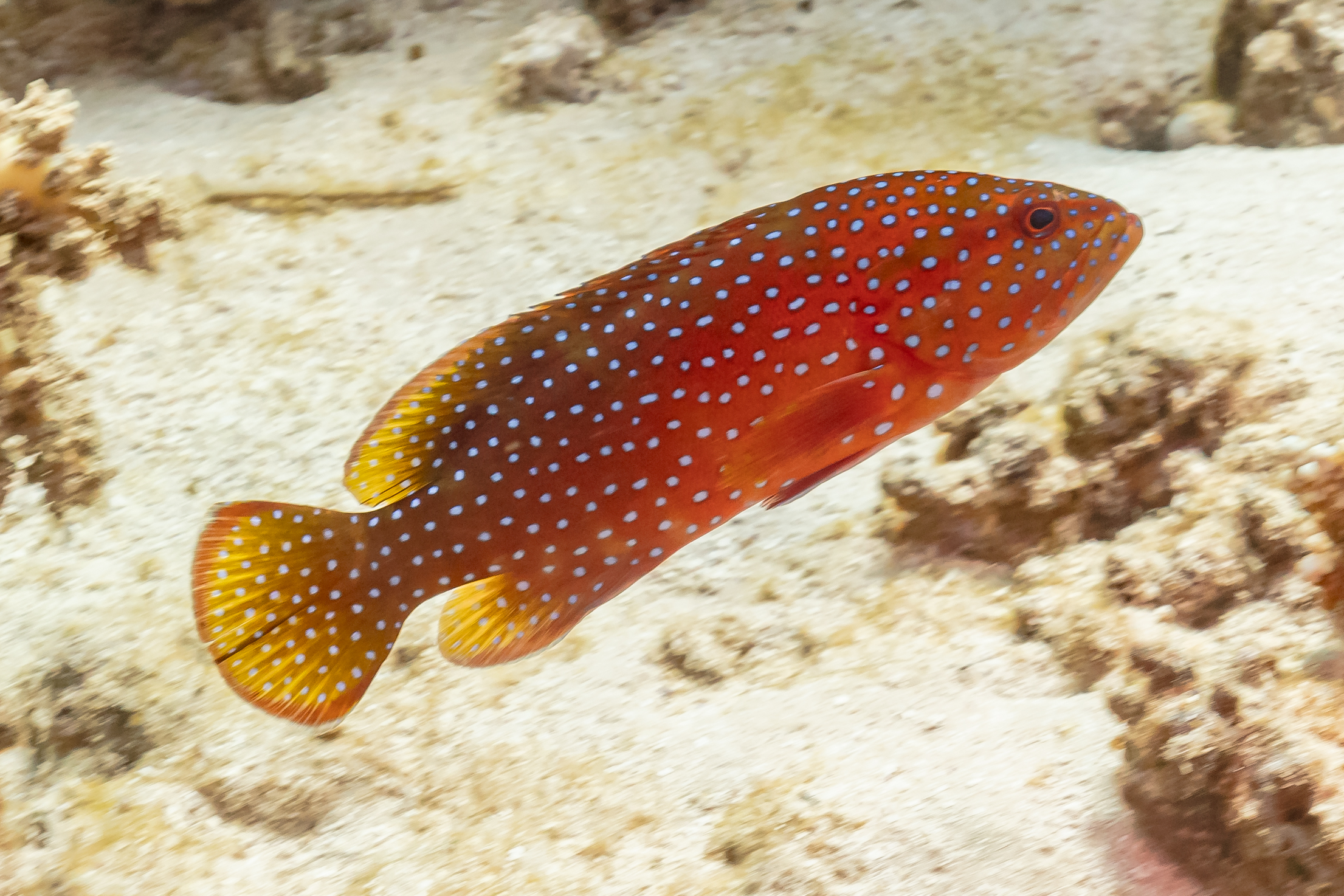
In the Red Sea

Cephalopholis miniata attains a maximum total length of 50 centimetres (20 in). It has a body which is 2.6-3.0 times as long in standard length as it is deep. The dorsal profile of the head is flat to slightly convex between the eyes. It has a rounded, finely serrated preopercle, which has a fleshy lower edge. The maxilla extends beyond the rear of the eye. The membranes of the dorsal fin have distinct indentations between the spines. There are 47-56 scales in the lateral line. The dorsal fin has 9 spines and 14-15 soft rays while the anal fin has 3 spines and 8-9 soft rays.

The colour of the body is orange-red to reddish brown with many small bright blue spots that cover the head, body and the dorsal, anal and caudal fins. They sometimes have diagonal paler bars on the flanks. The colour of the juveniles is orange to yellow with fewer widely separated faint blue spots.

== Habitat ==
Cephalopholis miniata is found in clear water where there are coastal and offshore coral reefs, it prefers exposed rather than protected areas. It is often seen in caves and below ledges. It is found at depths of 2 to 150 metres (6.6 to 492.1 ft).

== Biology ==
=== Diet ===
Like other groupers this species is predatory; over 80% of its diet consists of small fish, predominantly sea goldies (Pseudanthias squamipinnis) which are ambushed by the coral hind in a sudden rush up from the substrate. The remainder of its diet consists of crustaceans.

=== Reproduction ===
They form harems consisting of a single male and up to 12 females. The male defends the harem's territory which is around 475 square metres (5,110 ft^{2}) in area, each female has a smaller territory which she defends against other females. Coral hinds are protogynous hermaphrodite and they change sex from female to male. The male patrols the territory and visits each female, swimming parallel to each other when they meet.

== Utilisation ==
Cephalopholis miniata is an important species in commercial fisheries at the local level and is caught using hook and line, fish traps and spears. It is also a quarry species for recreational angling. It is a colourful species and is popular in public aquaria and forms a minor part of the aquarium trade.

== Gallery ==
In the Red Sea

In the Red Sea

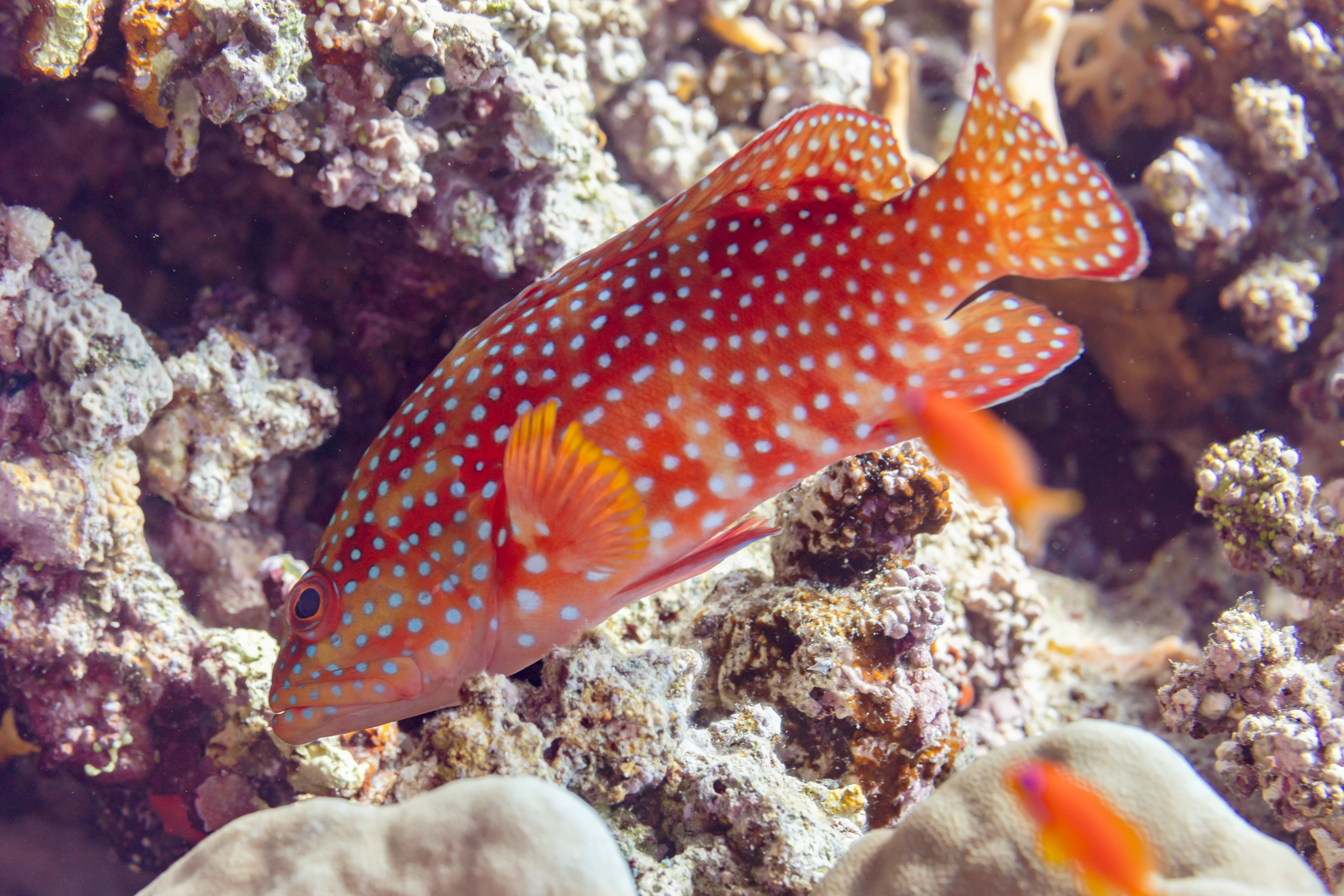
In the Red Sea

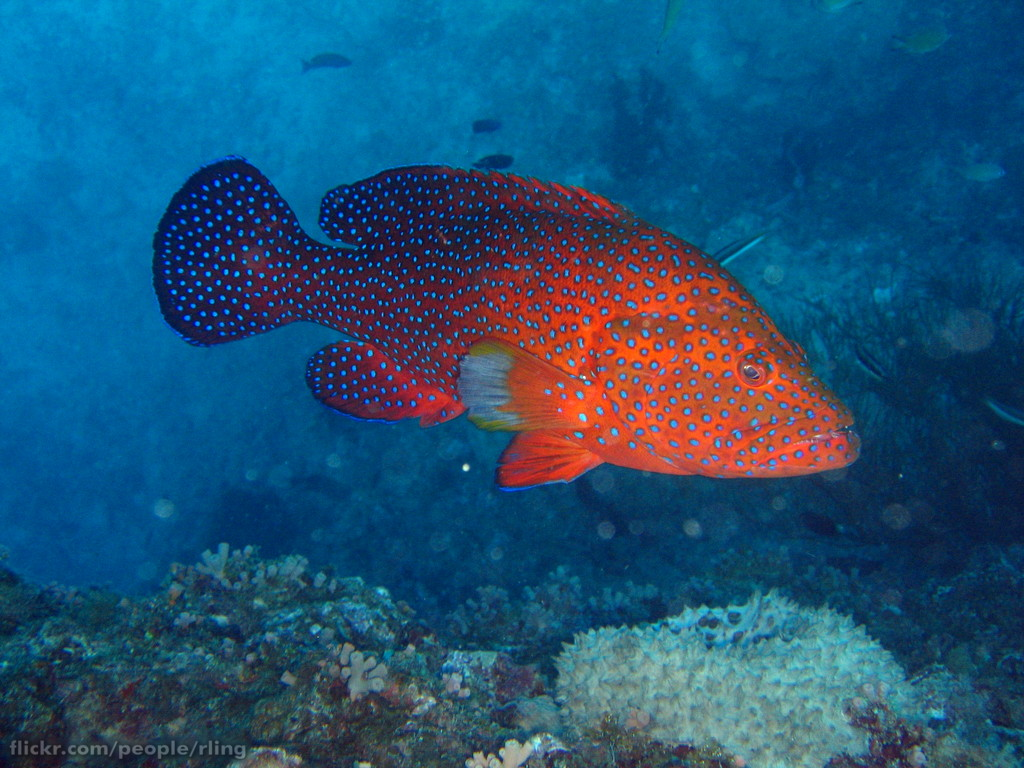
At the Great Barrier Reef

With a diver, in Indonesia

Showing teeth
