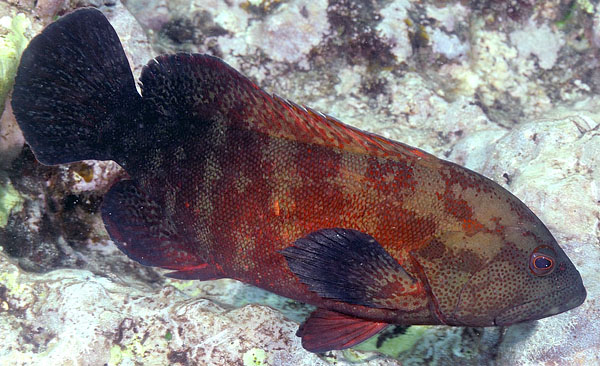
- At Réunion

Conservation status
- Least Concern (IUCN 3.1)

Scientific classification
- Kingdom: Animalia
- Phylum: Chordata
- Class: Actinopterygii
- Division: Teleostei
- Order: Perciformes
- Family: Epinephelidae
- Genus: Cephalopholis
- Species: C. nigripinnis

Binomial name
- Cephalopholis nigripinnis (Valenciennes, 1828)

Synonyms
- Serranus nigripinnis Valenciennes, 1828; Epinephelus nigripinnis (Valenciennes, 1828)

= Cephalopholis nigripinnis =

Species of fish

Cephalopholis nigripinnis, the blackfin grouper, banded-tail coral-cod, blackfin rockcod, darkfin hind or duskyfin rockcod, is a species of marine ray-finned fish, a grouper of the family Epinephelidae. It is found in the tropical Indian Ocean.

== Taxonomy ==
Cephalopholis nigripinnis was first formally described as Serranus nigripinnis in 1828 by the French zoologist Achille Valenciennes (1794-1865).

This species was formerly regarded as synonymous with Cephalopholis urodeta but is now largely accepted as a valid species. The two taxa are mostly allopatric but do occur together around western Indonesia, and may hybridize at Christmas Island.

== Distribution ==
Cephalopholis nigripinnis is distributed throughout the tropical Indian Ocean. In the Western Indian Ocean, they are found along the east coast of Africa from Kenya to as far south as South Africa, as well as the Seychelles, Mascarenes, Madagascar and the British Indian Ocean territory. Farther east, they are found in the Maldives and off Sri Lanka and in the Andaman Sea, south to Christmas Island.

== Description ==
~25 cm long C. nigrippinis, in Bali

Cephalopholis nigripinnis grows up to a total length of 28 cm (11 in). It has a body which is less deep than the head is long with the body being around a third as deep as the standard length. The profile between the eyes is convex and the rounded preopercle has a serrated edge and a fleshy lower edge. The maxilla extends beyond the eye. The dorsal fin has 9 spines and 14–16 soft rays while the anal fin has 3 spines and 8–9 soft rays. The caudal fin is rounded and the pelvic fins usually do not extend to the anus.

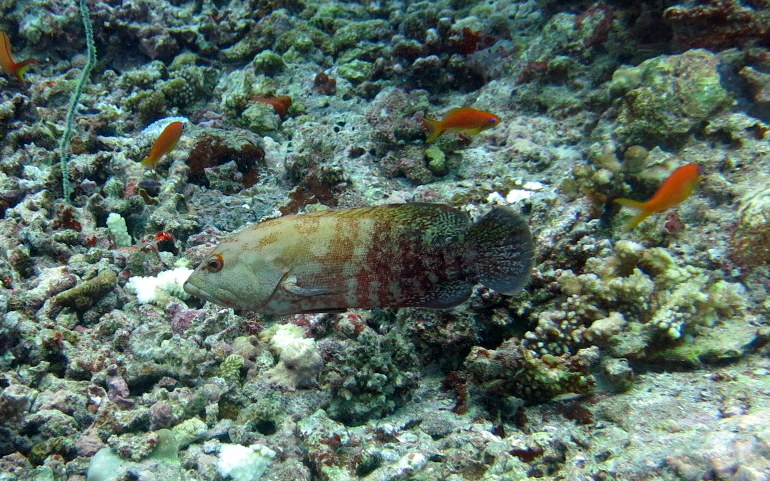
In the Maldives

This species is an overall red colour becoming darker towards its tail with some spotting and barring, but this is normally rather faint. The tail fin is dark and can be almost black and is covered in small pale spots while the pectoral fins are red at their base and darken towards the margin. In the Comoros Islands there are fish that are coloured almost black to match their dark coloured habitat. There is a prominent brown spot on the opercle.

== Habitat and biology ==
Cephalopholis nigripinnis is a common species that lives in areas with plentiful coral where they feed on small fishes and crustaceans. It occurs at depths down to 60 metres (200 ft).
