= Cephalopholis sonnerati =

- In Japan

Conservation status
- Least Concern (IUCN 3.1)

Scientific classification
- Kingdom: Animalia
- Phylum: Chordata
- Class: Actinopterygii
- Division: Teleostei
- Order: Perciformes
- Family: Epinephelidae
- Genus: Cephalopholis
- Species: C. sonnerati

Binomial name
- Cephalopholis sonnerati (Valenciennes, 1828)

Synonyms
- List: Serranus sonnerati Valenciennes, 1828; Epinephelus sonnerati (Valenciennes, 1828); Serranus zananella Valenciennes, 1828; Epinephelus janthinopterus Bleeker, 1873; Serranus unicolor Liénard, 1874; Epinephelus unicolor Bleeker, 1875; Cephalopholis purpureus Fourmanoir, 1966

Species of fish

Cephalopholis sonnerati, known as the tomato hind, tomato rockcod, or tomato cod, is a species of marine ray-finned fish, a grouper of the family Epinephelidae. It is distributed on coral reefs in the tropical Indo-Pacific. It is also sometimes called the orange-spotted cod, red coral cod, red rockcod, tomato grouper, or tomato seabass.

== Taxonomy ==
Cephalopholis sonnerati was first formally described as Serranus sonnerati in 1828 by the French zoologist Achille Valenciennes (1794–1864) with the type locality give as Puducherry in India.

== Distribution ==
Cephalopholis sonnerati has an Indo-Pacific distribution which extends from the coast of East Africa from the Gulf of Aden south to Durban in South Africa; east in to the Pacific Ocean as far as the Line Islands, north as far as southern Japan and south to Australia. It is not found in the Chagos Islands, the Red Sea or the Persian Gulf.

In Australia it is found from the Houtman Abrolhos in Western Australia to the vicinity of Darwin, Northern Territory and from the Cape York Peninsula, Queensland to the South West Rocks, New South Wales, as well as Lord Howe Island in the Tasman Sea.

== Description ==
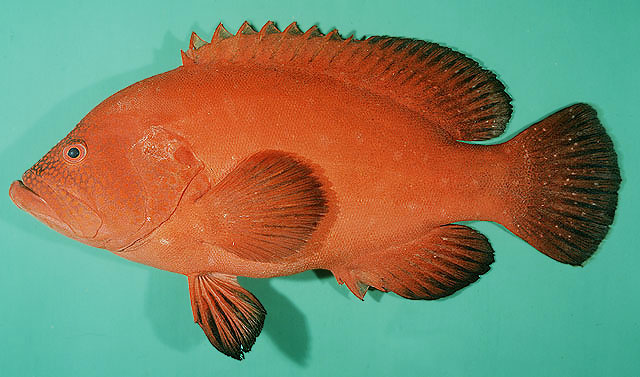
Indian Ocean specimen (Mauritius)

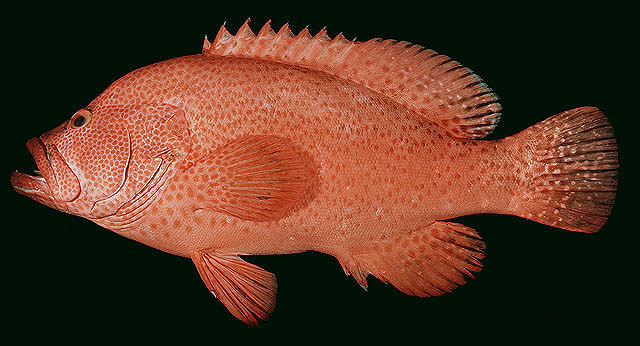
Pacific Ocean specimen (Okinawa)

In South Africa

Cephalopholis sonnerati has been recorded growing up to 57 centimetres (22 in) in length. It has a body which is 2.3 to 2.8 times as long as it is deep using standard length. The dorsal profile of the head in adults is straight to concave, although the nape is markedly convex. The preopercle is rounded and has fine serrations along its margins, with a shallow incision immediately above its angle, the lower edge has irregular serration and some of these are enlarged into small, exposed spines. The dorsal fin contains 9 spines and 14-16 soft rays while the anal fin has 3 spines and 9 soft rays. The caudal fin is rounded.

It is a light reddish-brown grouper with a dense covering of rusty spots on its body and a rounded tail with a white margin. The body profile is deep and stout with a dark blotch on the upper region of the gill cover. Pacific Ocean specimens have a generally pale reddish brown to yellowish brown body color, with numerous small dense brownish spots on the head, fins and the body.

== Habitat and biology ==
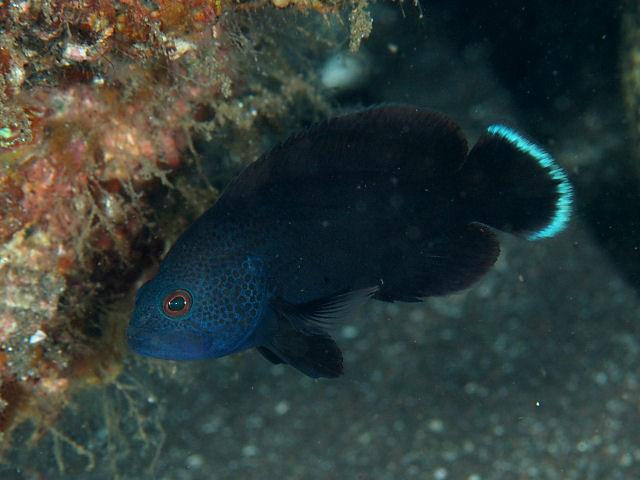
Juvenile, in Japan

Cephalopholis sonnerati occurs on deep lagoon reefs, outer reef slopes and in coastal areas with rocky substrate. The juveniles are usually found near sponge or coral heads. It is a solitary species with adults usually being accompanied by cleaner shrimps. They live in moderate depths of 30 to 100 m (98 to 332 ft). It feeds on small fishes and crustaceans. Maturity for males is reached at 34 cm (13 inches ) and 28 cm (11 inches) for females.

== Utilisation ==
This species is of commercial importance and usually sold fresh throughout its range. The tomato hind is caught using hook and line, spear, and in traps. It is found in Hong Kong live reef fish markets.

== Gallery ==
In captivity, in Japan

In Japan

In Mauritius

In Mozambique

Showing teeth, in South Africa
