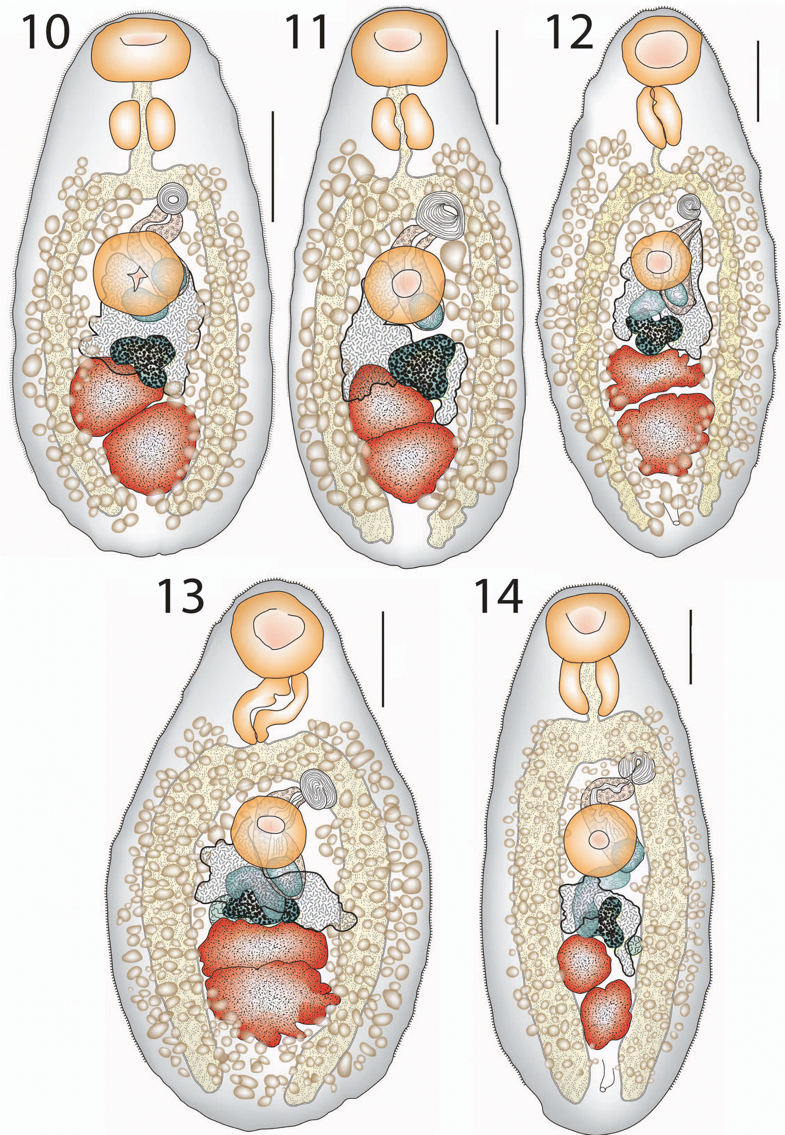
- Lepotrema hemitaurichthydis from various hosts and localities; holotype is #10

Scientific classification
- Kingdom: Animalia
- Phylum: Platyhelminthes
- Class: Trematoda
- Order: Plagiorchiida
- Family: Lepocreadiidae
- Genus: Lepotrema
- Species: L. hemitaurichthydis

Binomial name
- Lepotrema hemitaurichthydis Bray, Cutmore & Cribb, 2018

= Lepotrema hemitaurichthydis =

Species of fluke

Lepotrema hemitaurichthydis is a species of lepocreadiid digenean parasitic in the intestine of marine fish. It was described in 2018.

== Hosts and localities ==
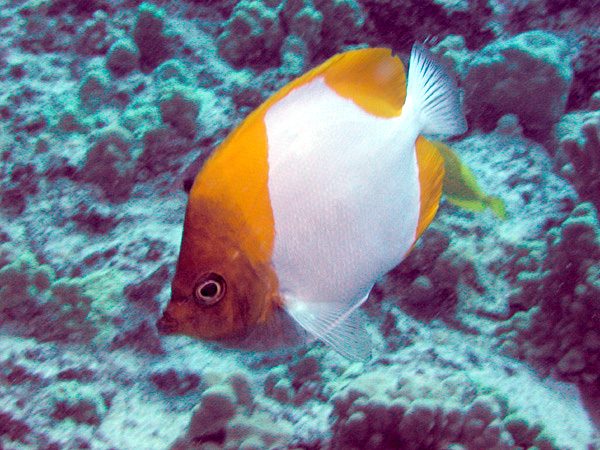
The pyramid butterflyfish, Hemitaurichthys polylepis is the type-host of Lepotrema hemitaurichthydis

The pyramid butterflyfish, Hemitaurichthys polylepis, (Perciformes: Chaetodontidae), is the type-host of Lepotrema hemitaurichthydis. Another host is the Thompson's butterflyfish Hemitaurichthys thompsoni. The type-locality is off Palau; other localities are off Tubuai, off Rimatara, Austral Islands, French Polynesia, and off Fatu Hiva, Marquesas, French Polynesia.
