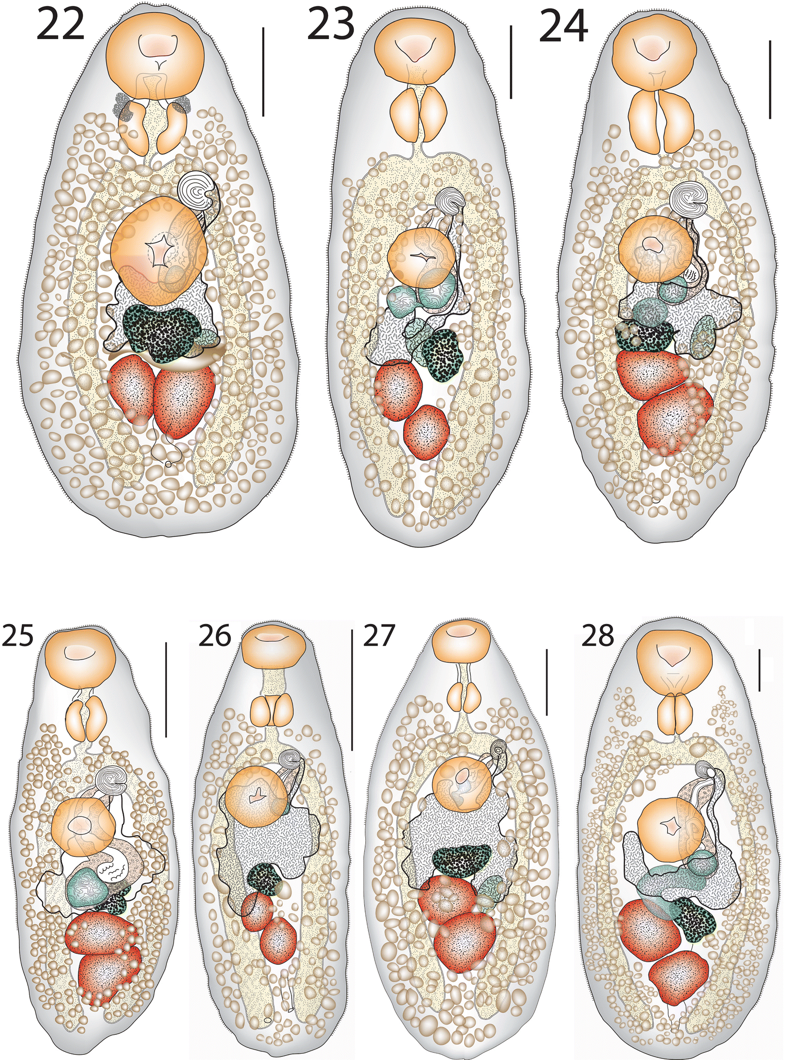
- Various species of Lepotrema; Lepotrema amblyglyphidodonis is #26 and #27

Scientific classification
- Kingdom: Animalia
- Phylum: Platyhelminthes
- Class: Trematoda
- Order: Plagiorchiida
- Family: Lepocreadiidae
- Genus: Lepotrema
- Species: L. amblyglyphidodonis

Binomial name
- Lepotrema amblyglyphidodonis Bray, Cutmore & Cribb, 2018

= Lepotrema amblyglyphidodonis =

Species of fluke

Lepotrema amblyglyphidodonis is a species of lepocreadiid digenean parasitic in the intestine of marine fish. It was described in 2018.

== Hosts and localities ==
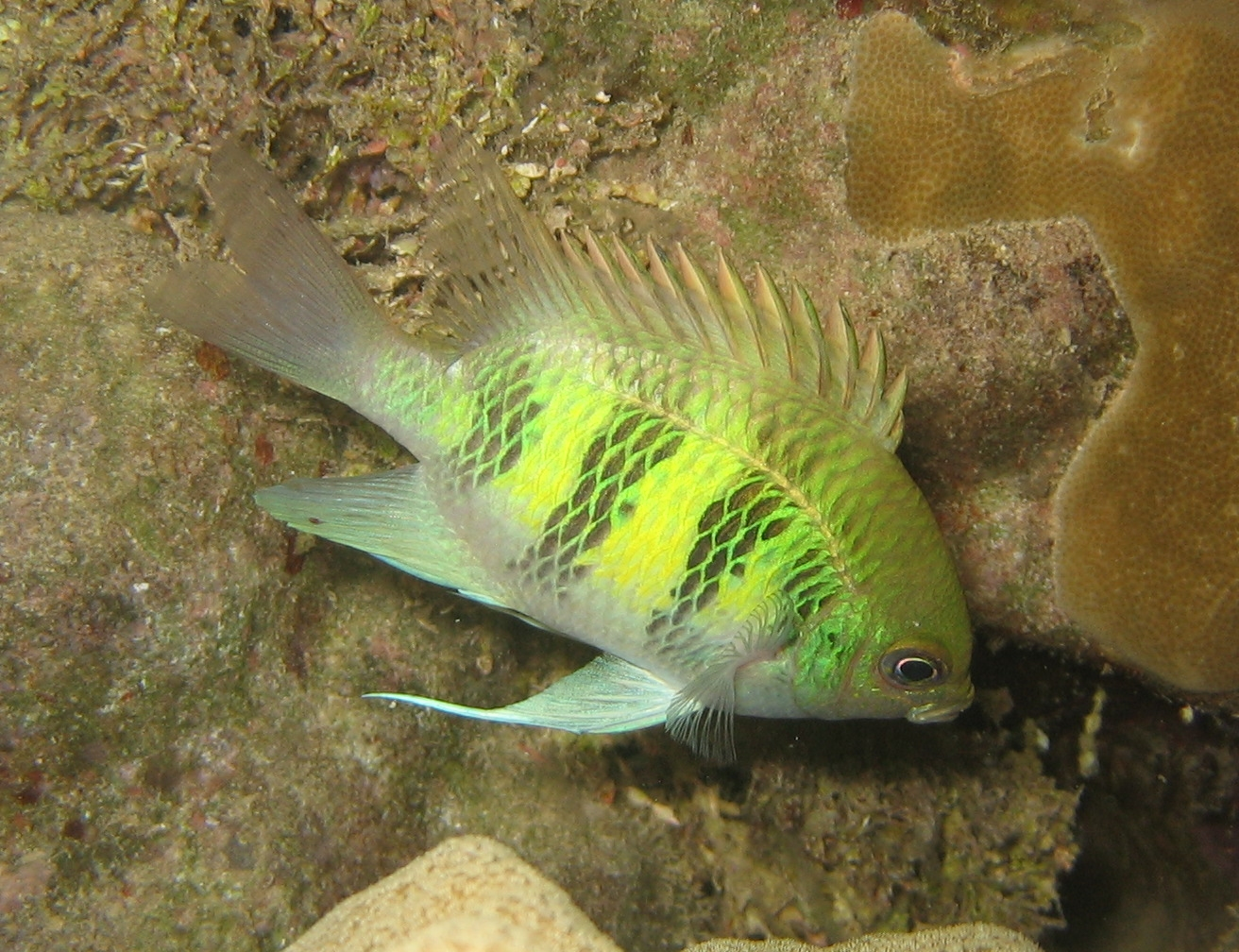
Amblyglyphidodon curacao is the type-host of Lepotrema amblyglyphidodonis

The staghorn damselfish, Amblyglyphidodon curacao, (Perciformes: Pomacentridae), is the type-host of Lepotrema amblyglyphidodonis. Another host is the Barrier Reef anemonefish, Amphipron akyndynos (Pomacentridae). The type-locality is off Heron Island, Great Barrier Reef, Australia.
