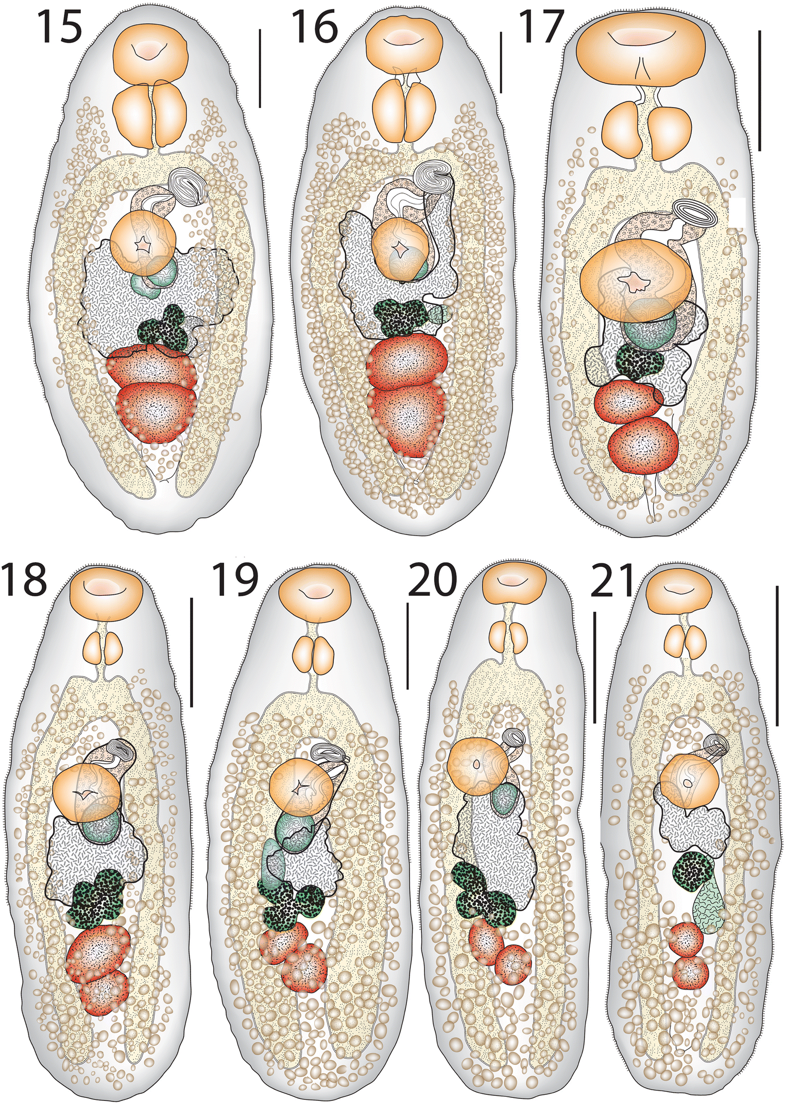
- Various species of Lepotrema; Lepotrema amansis is #17

Scientific classification
- Kingdom: Animalia
- Phylum: Platyhelminthes
- Class: Trematoda
- Order: Plagiorchiida
- Family: Lepocreadiidae
- Genus: Lepotrema
- Species: L. amansis

Binomial name
- Lepotrema amansis Bray, Cutmore & Cribb, 2018

= Lepotrema amansis =

Species of fluke

Lepotrema amansis is a species of lepocreadiid digenean parasitic in the intestine of marine fish. It was described in 2018.

== Hosts and localities ==
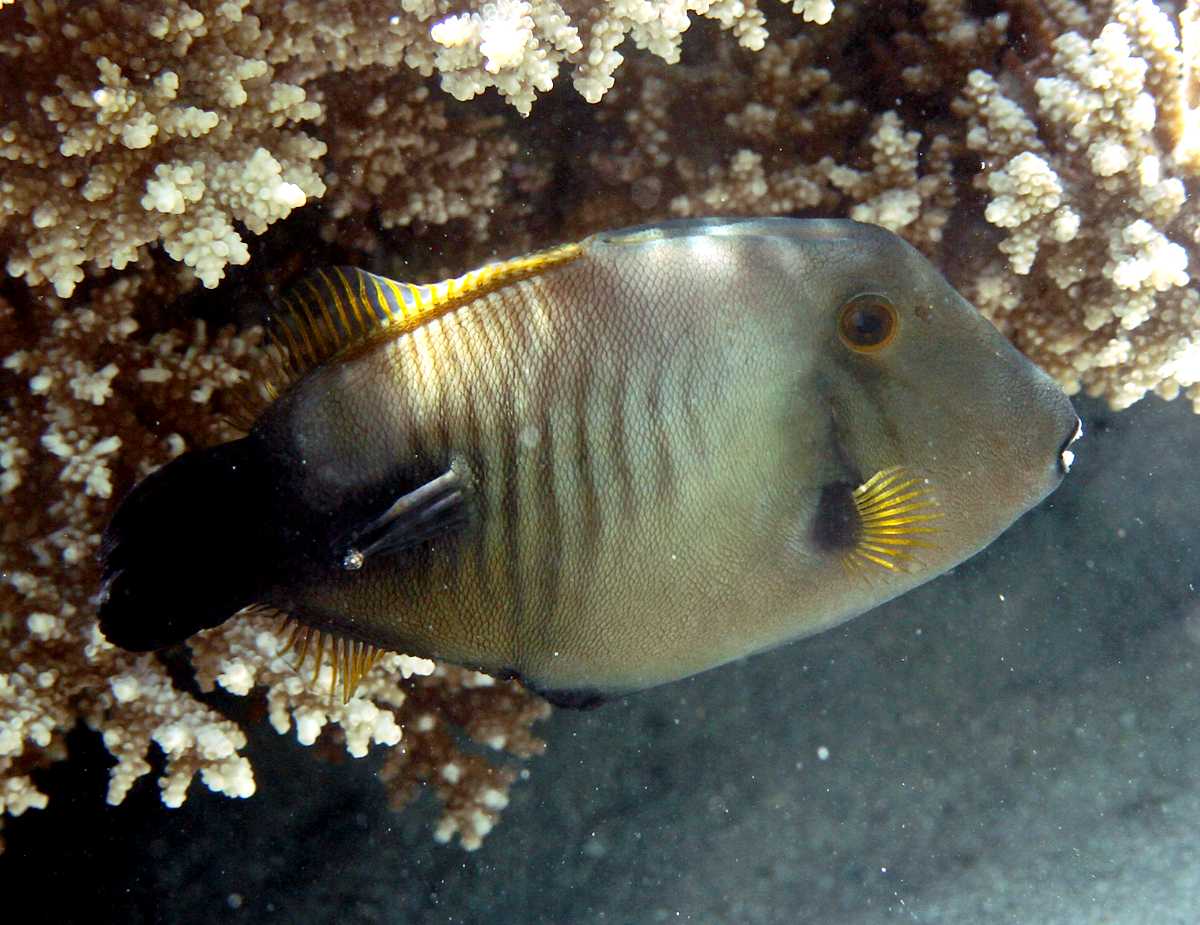
The broom filefish, Amanses scopas is the type-host of Lepotrema amansis

The broom filefish, Amanses scopas (Tetraodontiformes: Monacanthidae) is the type-host of Lepotrema amansis. The type-locality is off Heron Island, Great Barrier Reef, Australia.
