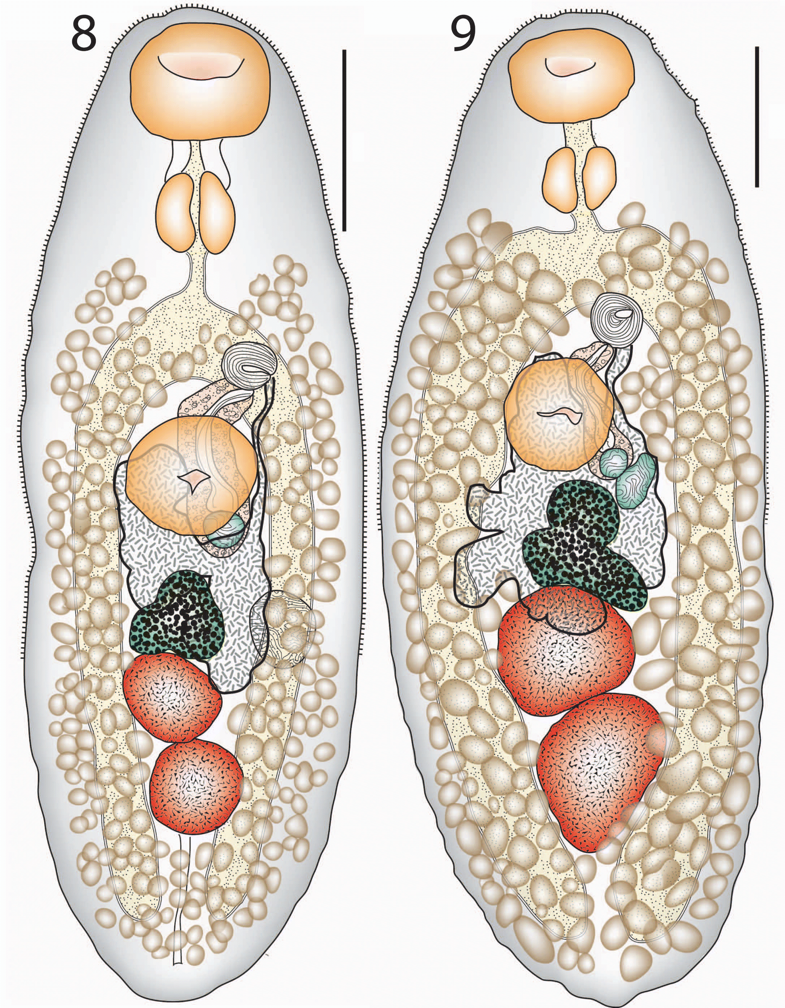
- Lepotrema acanthochromidis

Scientific classification
- Kingdom: Animalia
- Phylum: Platyhelminthes
- Class: Trematoda
- Order: Plagiorchiida
- Family: Lepocreadiidae
- Genus: Lepotrema
- Species: L. acanthochromidis

Binomial name
- Lepotrema acanthochromidis Bray, Cutmore & Cribb, 2018

= Lepotrema acanthochromidis =

Species of fluke

Lepotrema acanthochromidis is a species of lepocreadiid digenean parasitic in the intestine of marine fish. It was described in 2018.

== Hosts and localities ==
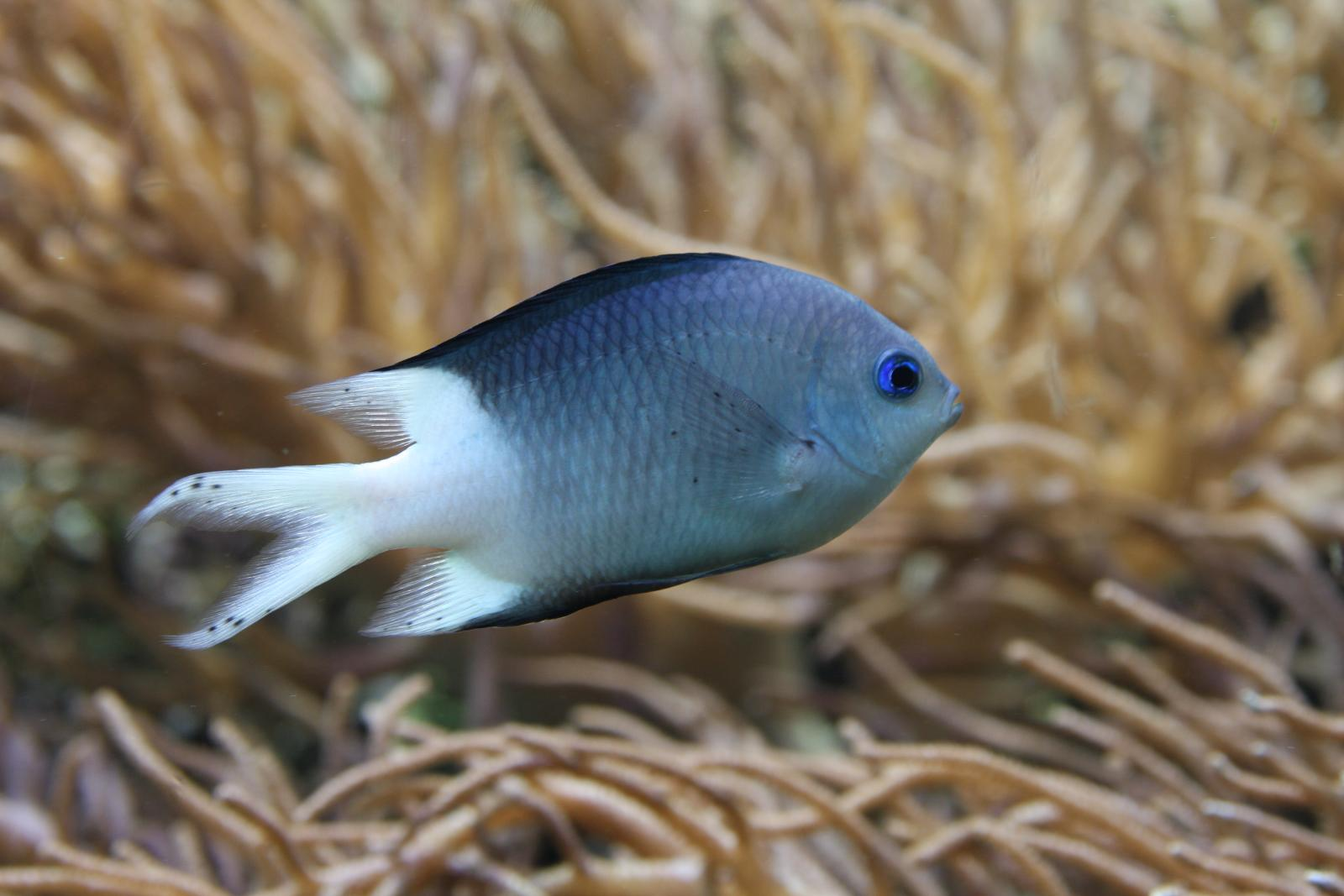
The spiny chromis Acanthochromis polyacanthus is the type-host of Lepotrema acanthochromidis

The spiny chromes, Acanthochromis polyacanthus (Perciformes: Pomacentridae), is the type-host of Lepotrema acanthochromidis. The type-locality is off Heron Island, Great Barrier Reef, Australia, and another locality is off Lizard Island, Great Barrier Reef, Australia.
