= A. aureus =

A. aureus may refer to:

An abbreviation of a species name. In binomial nomenclature the name of a species is always the name of the genus to which the species belongs, followed by the species name (also called the species epithet). In A. aureus the genus name has been abbreviated to A. and the species has been spelled out in full. In a document that uses this abbreviation it should always be clear from the context which genus name has been abbreviated.

Some of the most common uses of A. aureus are:

- Afrixalus aureus, the golden banana frog or golden dwarf reed frog, a frog species found in Eswatini, Mozambique, South Africa and possibly Zimbabwe
- Amblyglyphidodon aureus, a damselfish species from the Western Pacific
- Apogon aureus, the ring-tailed cardinalfish, a fish species
- Arctocebus aureus, the golden angwantibo, a strepsirrhine primate species found in Cameroon, the Republic of Congo, Equatorial Guinea and Gabon

== See also ==
- Aureus (disambiguation)
