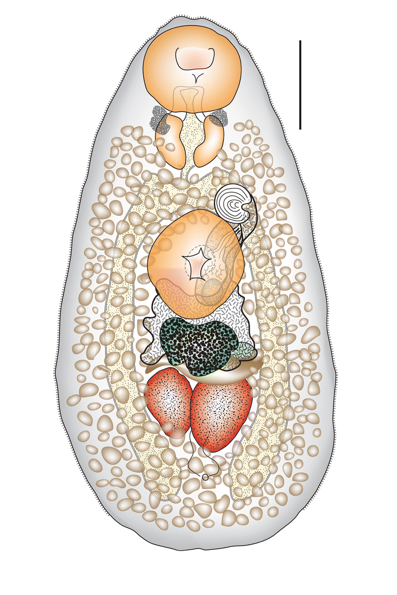
- Lepotrema justinei

Scientific classification
- Kingdom: Animalia
- Phylum: Platyhelminthes
- Class: Trematoda
- Order: Plagiorchiida
- Family: Lepocreadiidae
- Genus: Lepotrema
- Species: L. justinei

Binomial name
- Lepotrema justinei Bray, Cutmore & Cribb, 2018

= Lepotrema justinei =

Species of fluke

Lepotrema justinei is a species of lepocreadiid digenean parasitic in the intestine of marine fish. It was described in 2018. This species was not characterised by molecular means but was distinguished from other species of the genus Lepotrema by morphological characteristics. It is the only species with more or less symmetrical testes, and, probably as a result, it tends to be broader than the other species.

== Etymology ==
According to Bray, Cutmore & Cribb, the species was named justinei "after Professor Jean-Lou Justine of the Muséum National d’Histoire Naturelle, Paris, France, in recognition of his massive contributions to marine fish parasitology".

== Hosts and localities ==
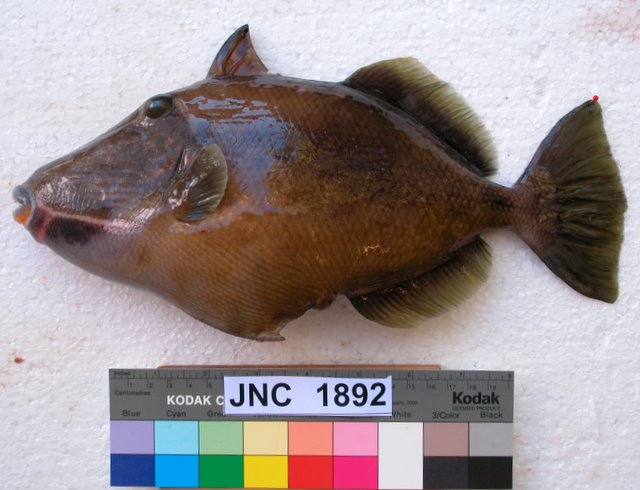
The masked triggerfish, Sufflamen fraenatum is the type-host of Lepotrema justinei

The masked triggerfish, Sufflamen fraenatum, (Tetraodontiformes: Balistidae) is the type-host of Lepotrema justinei. The type-locality is the Interior Lagoon near Récif Toombo, off Nouméa, New Caledonia.
