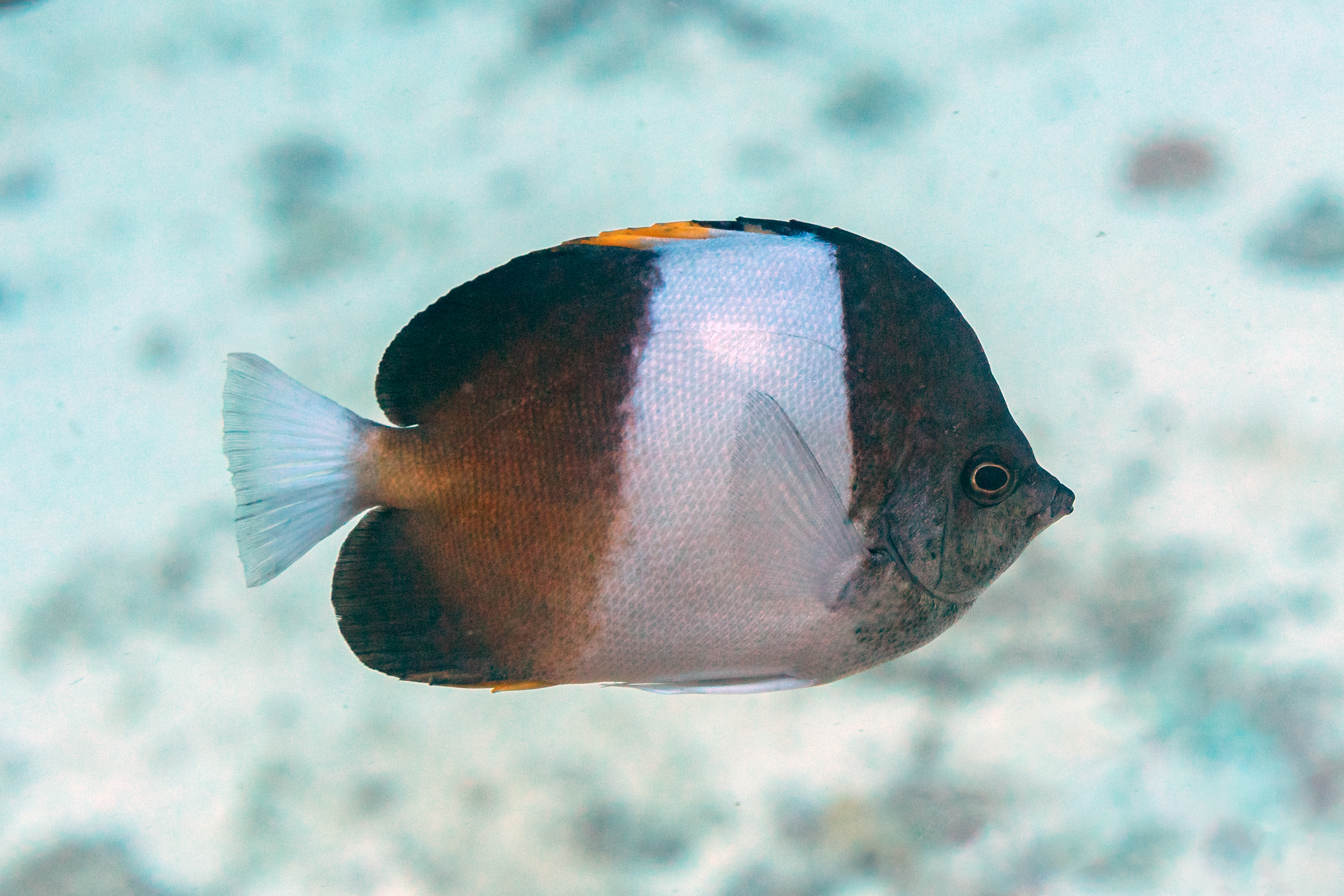

Conservation status
- Least Concern (IUCN 3.1)

Scientific classification
- Kingdom: Animalia
- Phylum: Chordata
- Class: Actinopterygii
- Order: Acanthuriformes
- Family: Chaetodontidae
- Genus: Hemitaurichthys
- Species: H. zoster

Binomial name
- Hemitaurichthys zoster (Bennett, 1831)

Synonyms
- Chaetodon zoster Bennett, 1831; Tetragonoptrus zoster (Bennett, 1831)

= Hemitaurichthys zoster =

Species of fish

Hemitaurichthys zoster, commonly known as the brown-and-white butterflyfish, black pyramid butterflyfish, zoster butterflyfish or brushtooth butterflyfish, is a species of marine ray-finned fish in the butterflyfish family Chaetodontidae. It is native to the Indian Ocean.

== Etymology ==
Hemitaurichthys zoster was first formally described as Chaetodon zoster in 1831 by the English zoologist Edward Turner Bennett (1797–1837) with the type locality given as Mauritius. The specific name zoster means "belt" or "girdle" and is presumed to refer to the wide, white band in the middle of this fish's body.

== Description ==
Like most other butterflyfish species, Hemitaurichthys zoster is a small fish, with a maximum length of 18 cm (7.1 in). Its body is compressed laterally with a rounded profile, but the snout is somewhat stretched, with a small terminal protractile mouth. The body is black, crossed in its center by a broad white trapezoid band with a yellow top, corresponding to the center of the dorsal fin. The caudal fin is white.

== Distribution and habitat ==
Hemitaurichthys zoster is widespread throughout tropical and subtropical waters of the Indian Ocean, from the eastern coast of Africa to India and Java, Indonesia. It lives in large schools on outer reef slopes, from which it can sally into open water to feed on plankton. The depth range at which this species is typically found is 3–40 m (9.8–131.2 ft).

== Human interactions ==
Hemitaurichthys zoster can be found in the aquarium trade, but is rare.

== Conservation status ==
Hemitaurichthys zoster is a planktivore, so the species may be affected by climate-induced reductions in planktonic productivity. However, there does not appear to be any specific current threats, so it is listed as a Least Concern (LC) species by the IUCN.
