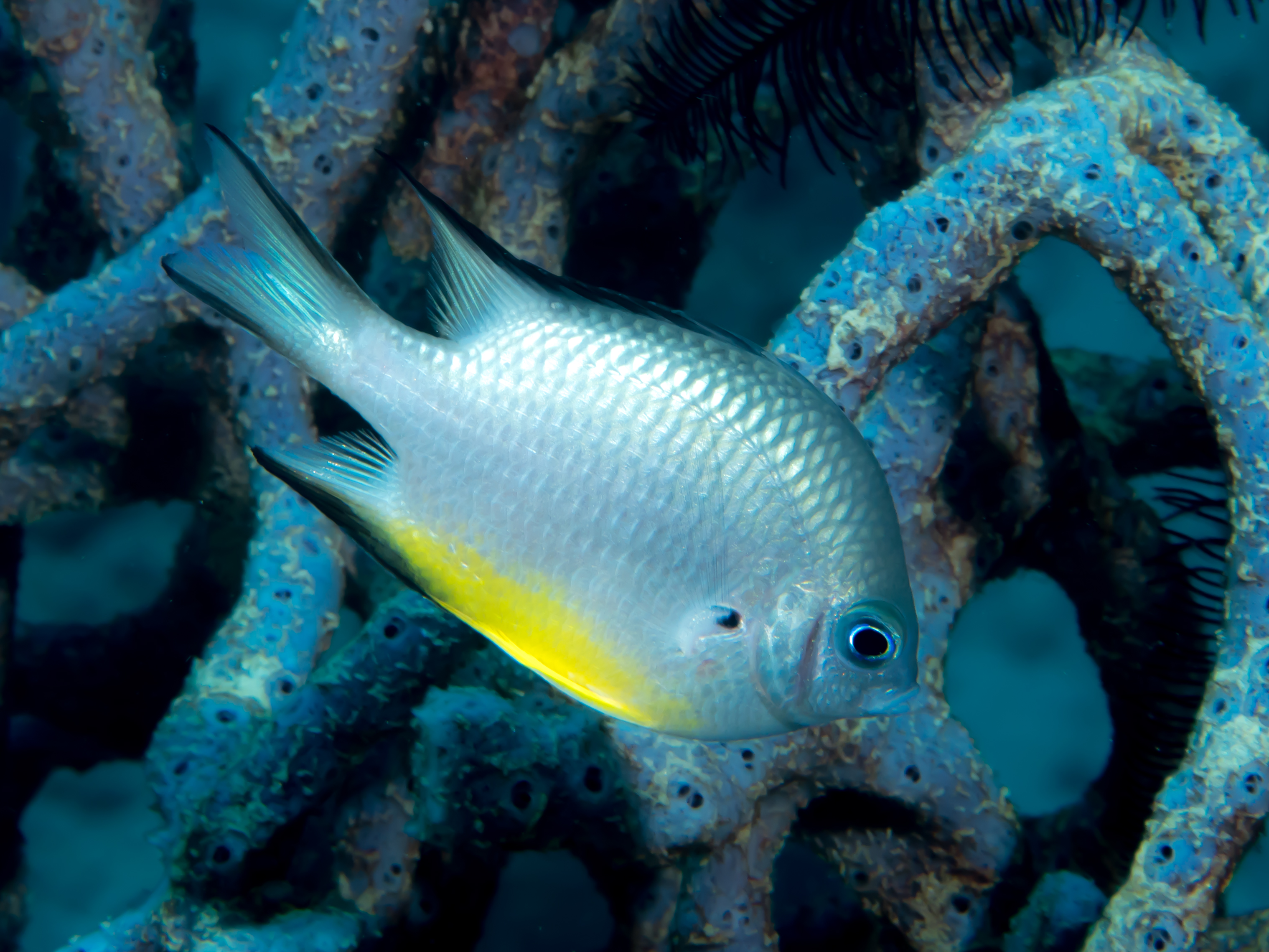
- In the Philippines

Conservation status
- Least Concern (IUCN 3.1)

Scientific classification
- Kingdom: Animalia
- Phylum: Chordata
- Class: Actinopterygii
- Order: Blenniiformes
- Family: Pomacentridae
- Genus: Amblyglyphidodon
- Species: A. leucogaster

Binomial name
- Amblyglyphidodon leucogaster (Bleeker, 1847)

Synonyms
- Glyphisodon leucogaster Bleeker, 1847; Abudefduf leucogaster (Bleeker, 1847); Plectroglyphidodon leucogaster (Bleeker, 1847)

= Amblyglyphidodon leucogaster =

Species of fish

Amblyglyphidodon leucogaster also known as the yellowbelly damselfish is a species of marine fish in the family Pomacentridae, the damselfishes and clownfishes. It's widespread throughout the tropical waters of the Indo-West Pacific, Red Sea included. It's a small size fish that can reach a maximum size of 13 cm length.

== Gallery ==
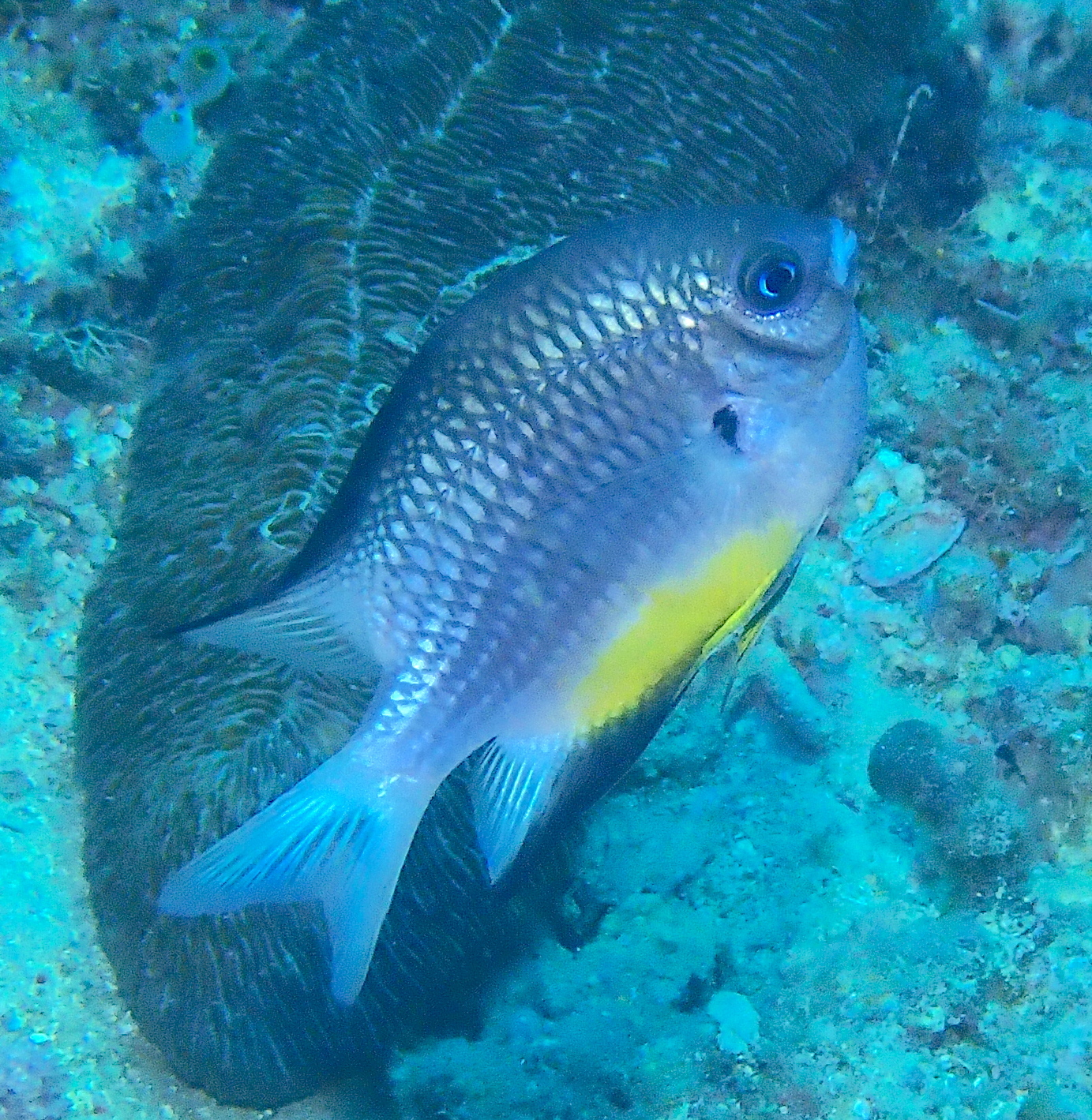
In Indonesia

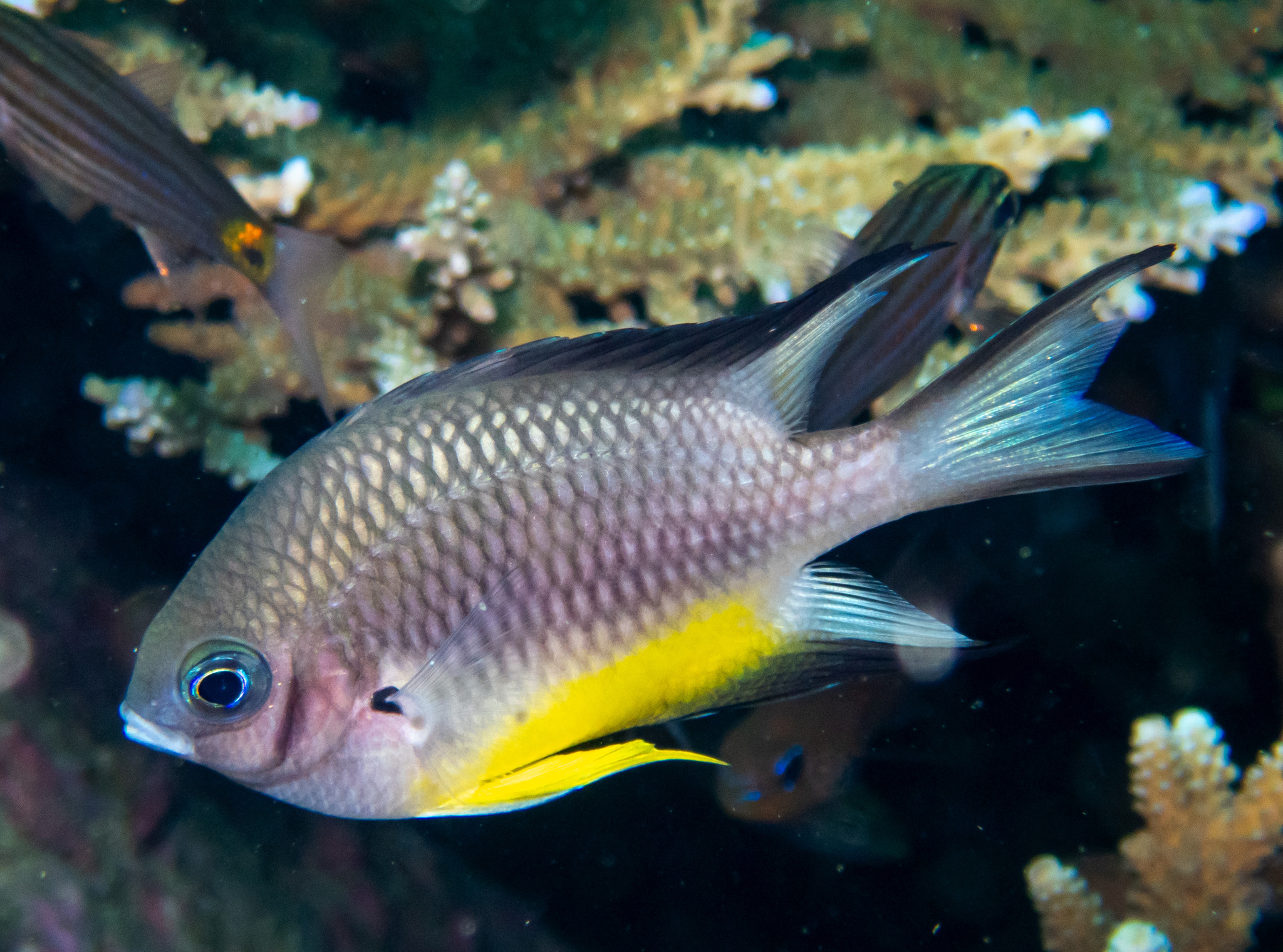
In Thailand
