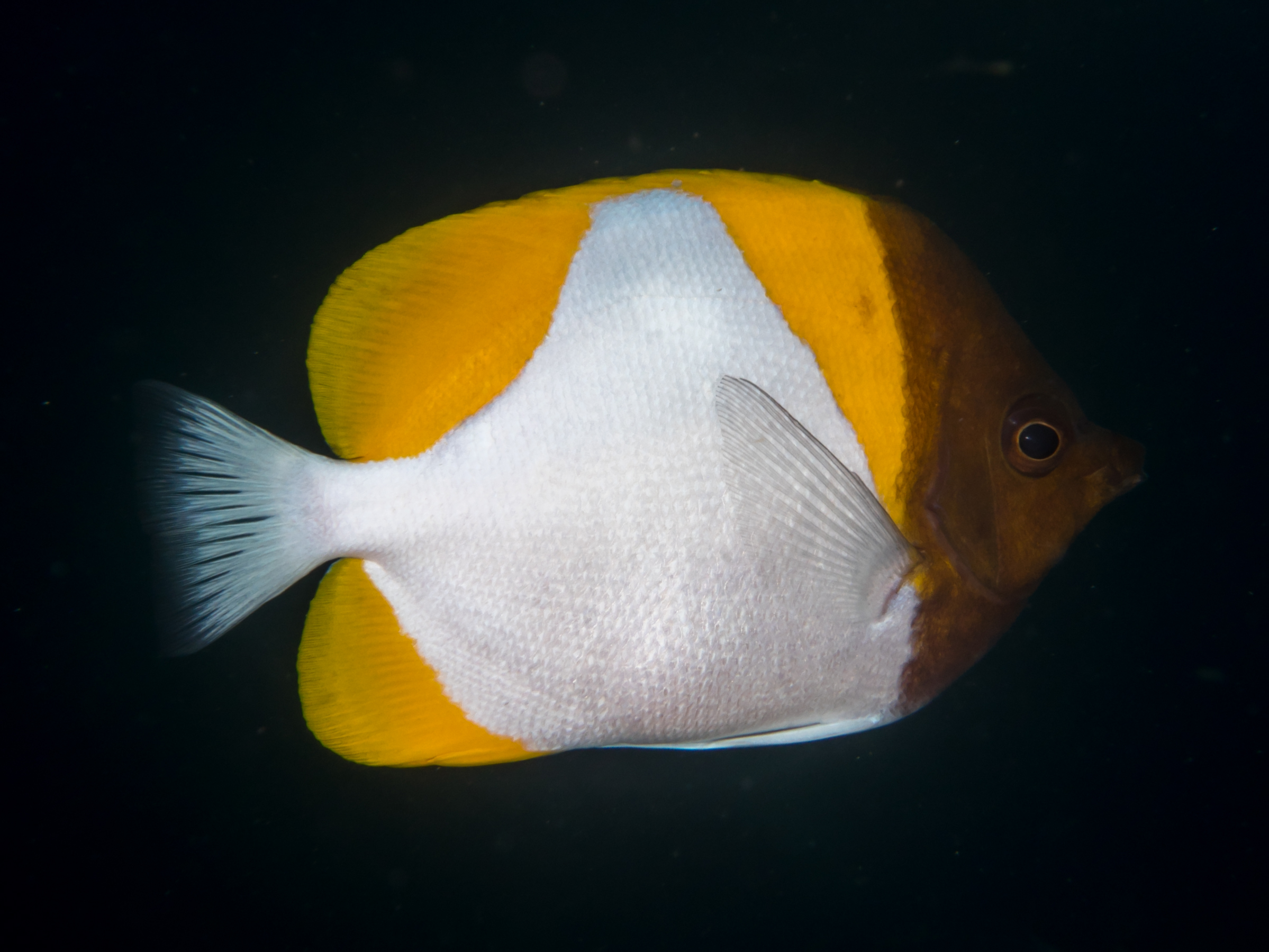
- Pyramid butterflyfish (H. polylepis)

Scientific classification
- Kingdom: Animalia
- Phylum: Chordata
- Class: Actinopterygii
- Order: Acanthuriformes
- Family: Chaetodontidae
- Genus: Hemitaurichthys; Bleeker, 1876

Type species
- Chaetodon polylepis Bleeker, 1857

= Hemitaurichthys =

Genus of fishes

Hemitaurichthys is a genus of marine ray-finned fish, butterflyfishes from the family Chaetodontidae. They are native to the Indian and Pacific oceans.

The name of this genus is a compound of the Greek hemi meaning “half” and in this case meaning “similar to“, taurus meaning “bull” and ichthys meaning “fish”, taurichthys being a synonym of Heniochus and refers to the bony protuberances, similar to horns, on the head of Heniochus varius.

== Species ==
There are currently four recognized species in this genus:

Species	Common name	Image
Hemitaurichthys multispinosus J. E. Randall, 1975	many-spined butterflyfish	
Hemitaurichthys polylepis (Bleeker, 1857)	pyramid butterflyfish	
Hemitaurichthys thompsoni Fowler, 1923	Thompson's butterflyfish	
Hemitaurichthys zoster (E. T. Bennett, 1831)	brown-and-white butterflyfish	
