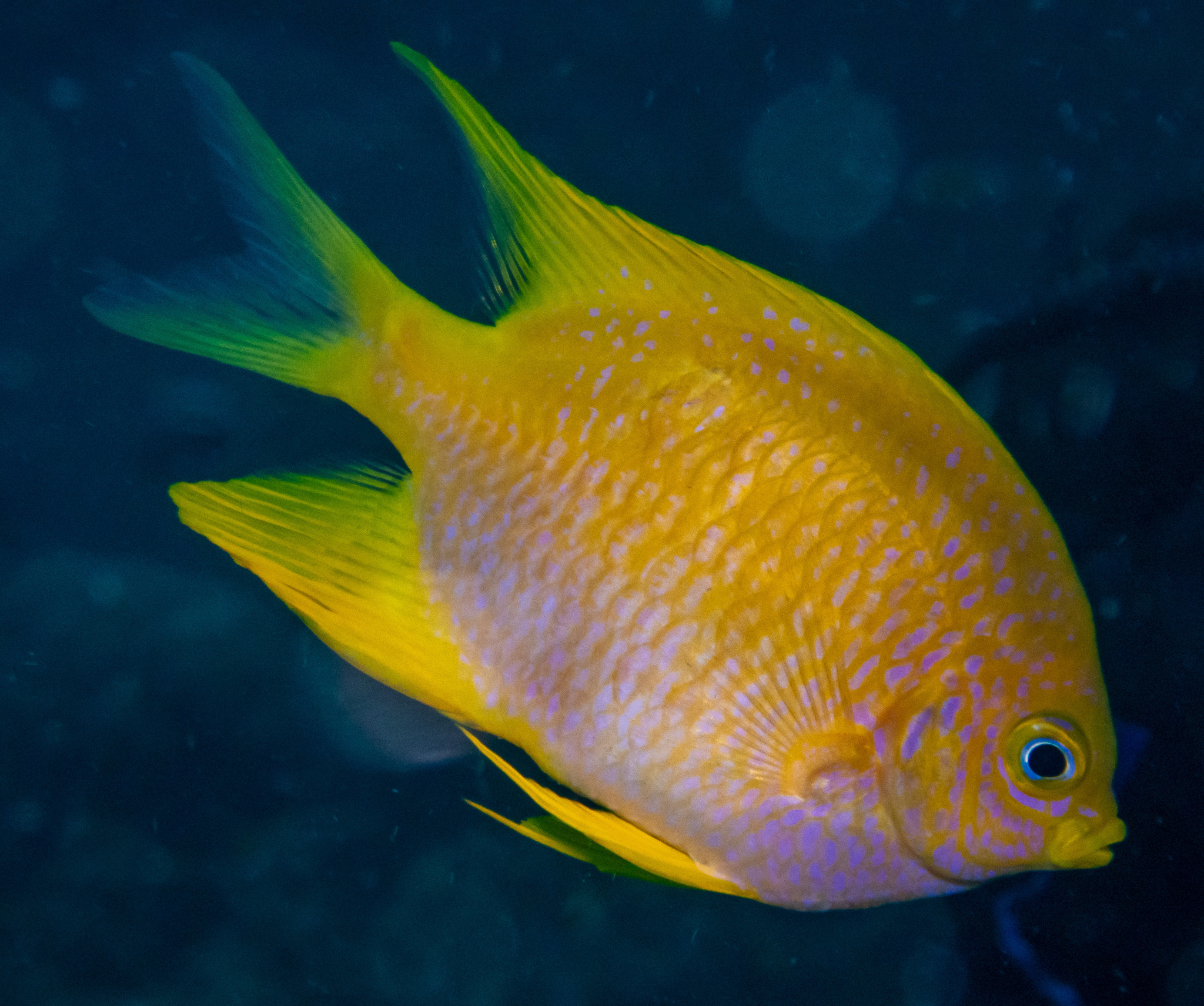
- Amblyglyphidodon aureus

Scientific classification
- Kingdom: Animalia
- Phylum: Chordata
- Class: Actinopterygii
- Order: Blenniiformes
- Family: Pomacentridae
- Subfamily: Pomacentrinae
- Genus: Amblyglyphidodon; Bleeker, 1877

Type species
- Glyphisodon aureus Cuvier, 1830

= Amblyglyphidodon =

Genus of fishes

Amblyglyphidodon is a genus of fish in the family Pomacentridae. These damselfish swim singly, in pairs, or in small groups. They are often found among corals.

== Species ==
There are currently 11 recognized species in this genus:

Species	Common name	Image
Amblyglyphidodon aureus (G. Cuvier, 1830)	Golden damselfish	
Amblyglyphidodon batunai G. R. Allen, 1995	Batuna damsel	
Amblyglyphidodon curacao (Bloch, 1787)	Staghorn damselfish	
Amblyglyphidodon flavilatus G. R. Allen & J. E. Randall, 1980	Yellowfin damsel	
Amblyglyphidodon flavopurpureus G. R. Allen, Erdmann & Drew, 2012	Cenderawasih damselfish	
Amblyglyphidodon indicus G. R. Allen & J. E. Randall, 2002	Maldives damselfish	
Amblyglyphidodon leucogaster (Bleeker, 1847)	Yellowbelly damselfish	
Amblyglyphidodon melanopterus G. R. Allen & J. E. Randall, 2002		
Amblyglyphidodon orbicularis (Hombron & Jacquinot, 1853)		
Amblyglyphidodon silolona G. R. Allen, Erdmann & Drew, 2012	Silolona damselfish	
Amblyglyphidodon ternatensis (Bleeker, 1853)	Ternate damsel	
