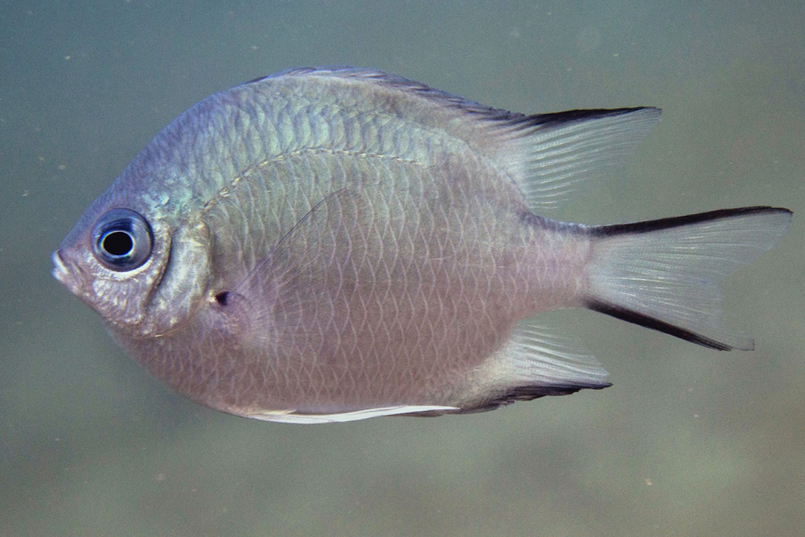
- In Kenya

Conservation status
- Least Concern (IUCN 3.1)

Scientific classification
- Kingdom: Animalia
- Phylum: Chordata
- Class: Actinopterygii
- Order: Blenniiformes
- Family: Pomacentridae
- Genus: Amblyglyphidodon
- Species: A. indicus

Binomial name
- Amblyglyphidodon indicus G. R. Allen & J. E. Randall, 2002

= Amblyglyphidodon indicus =

Species of fish

Amblyglyphidodon indicus also known as the Maldives damselfish is a species of fish in the family Pomacentridae. It is native to the Indian Ocean, including the Red Sea and the Maldives. The fish reaches 8.3 centimeters in length. Its diet includes zooplankton and floating organic material. It is likely that this fish is reef-associated. It has been noted at depths up to 15 meters.

== Gallery ==
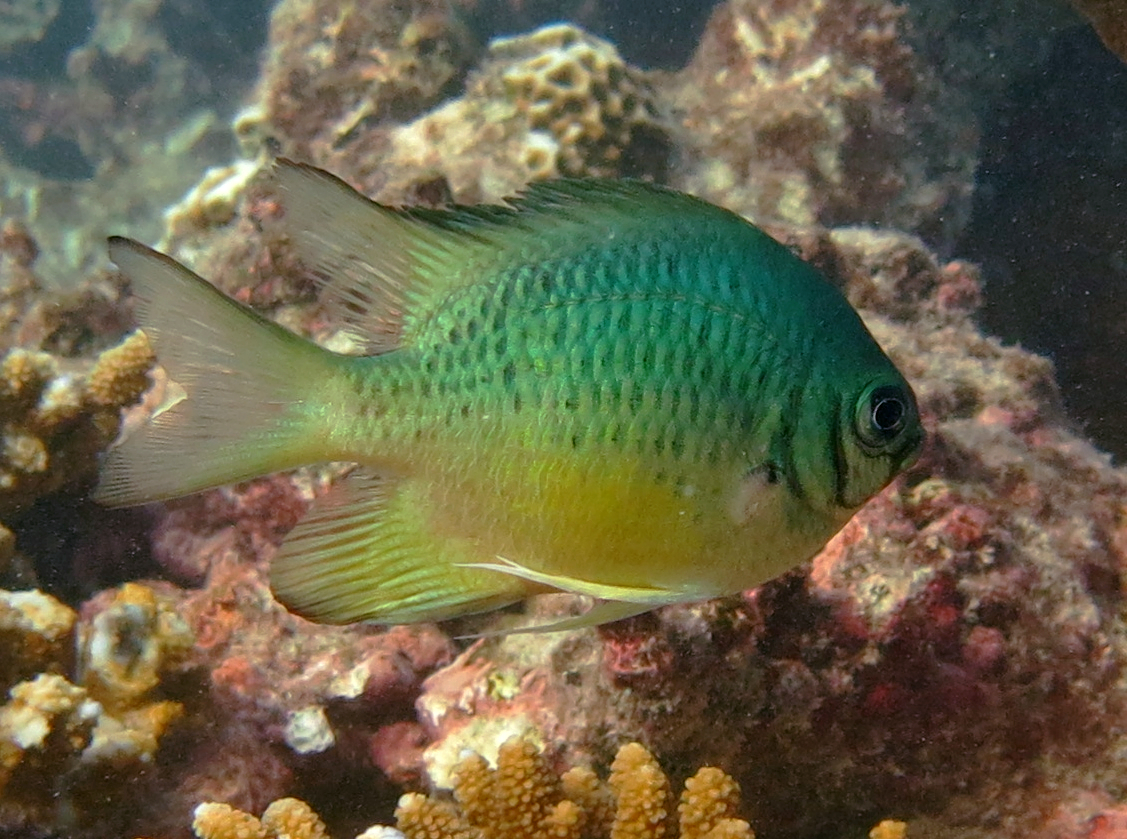
A. indicus in the Maldives are more yellowish

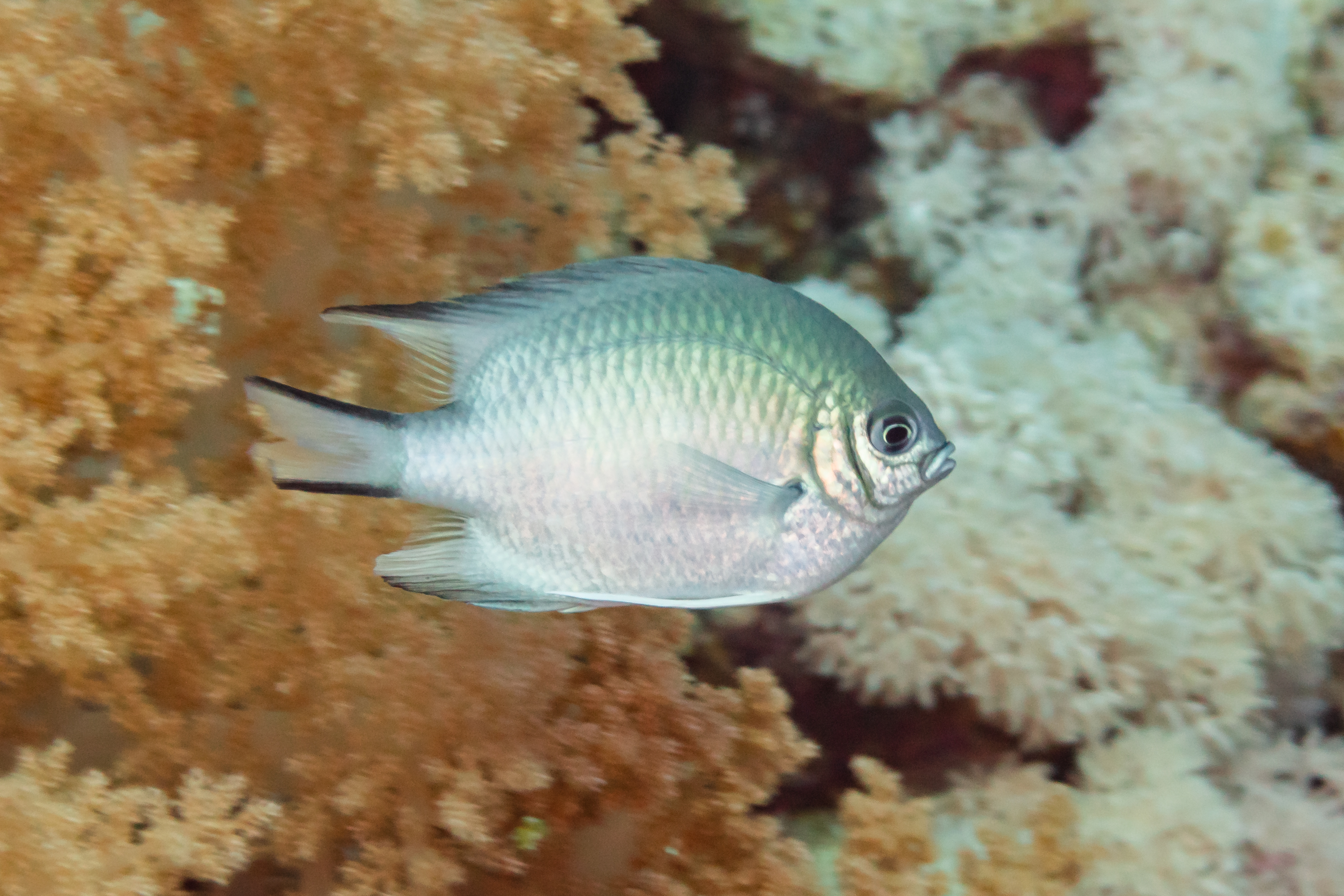
In the Red Sea

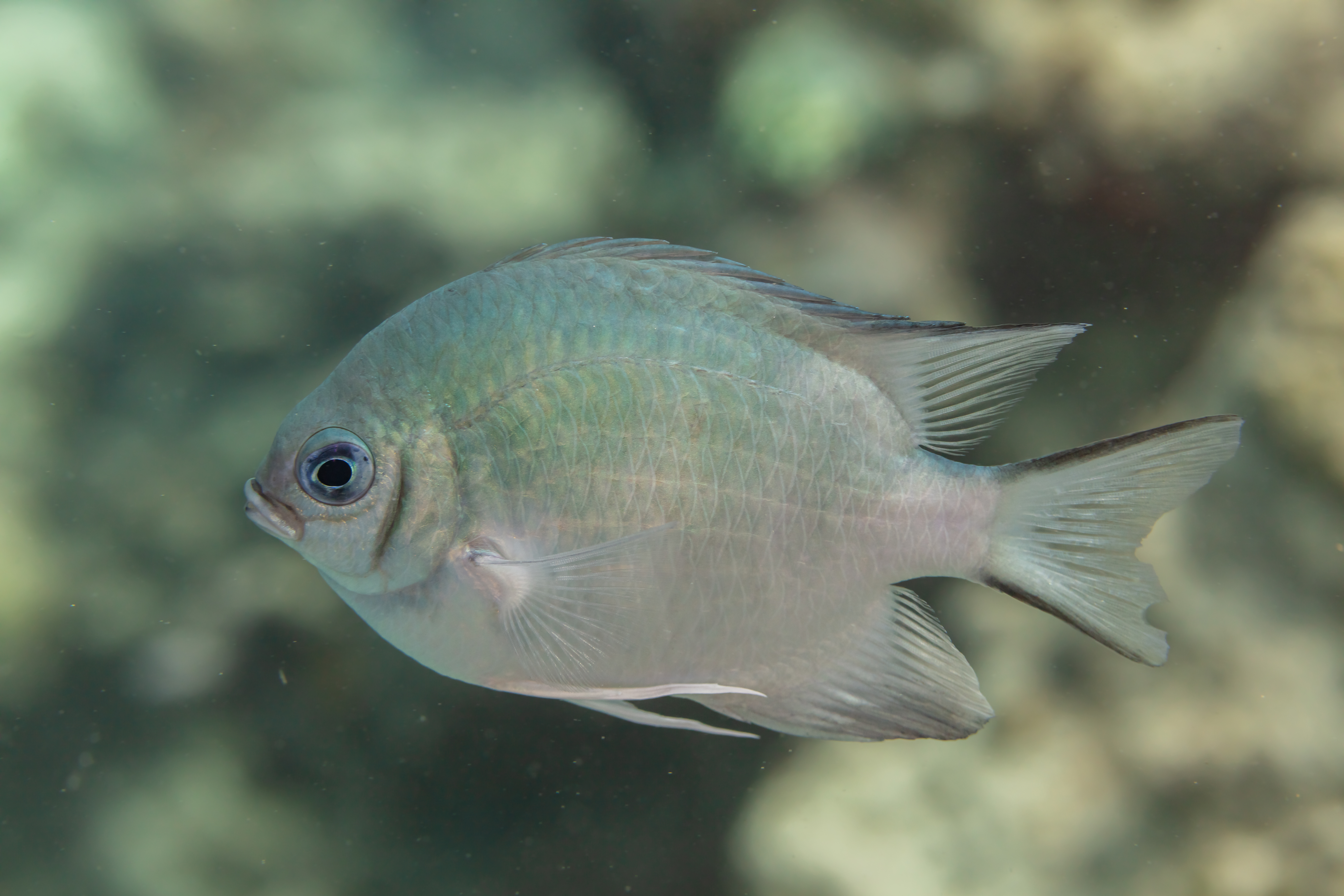
In Tanzania

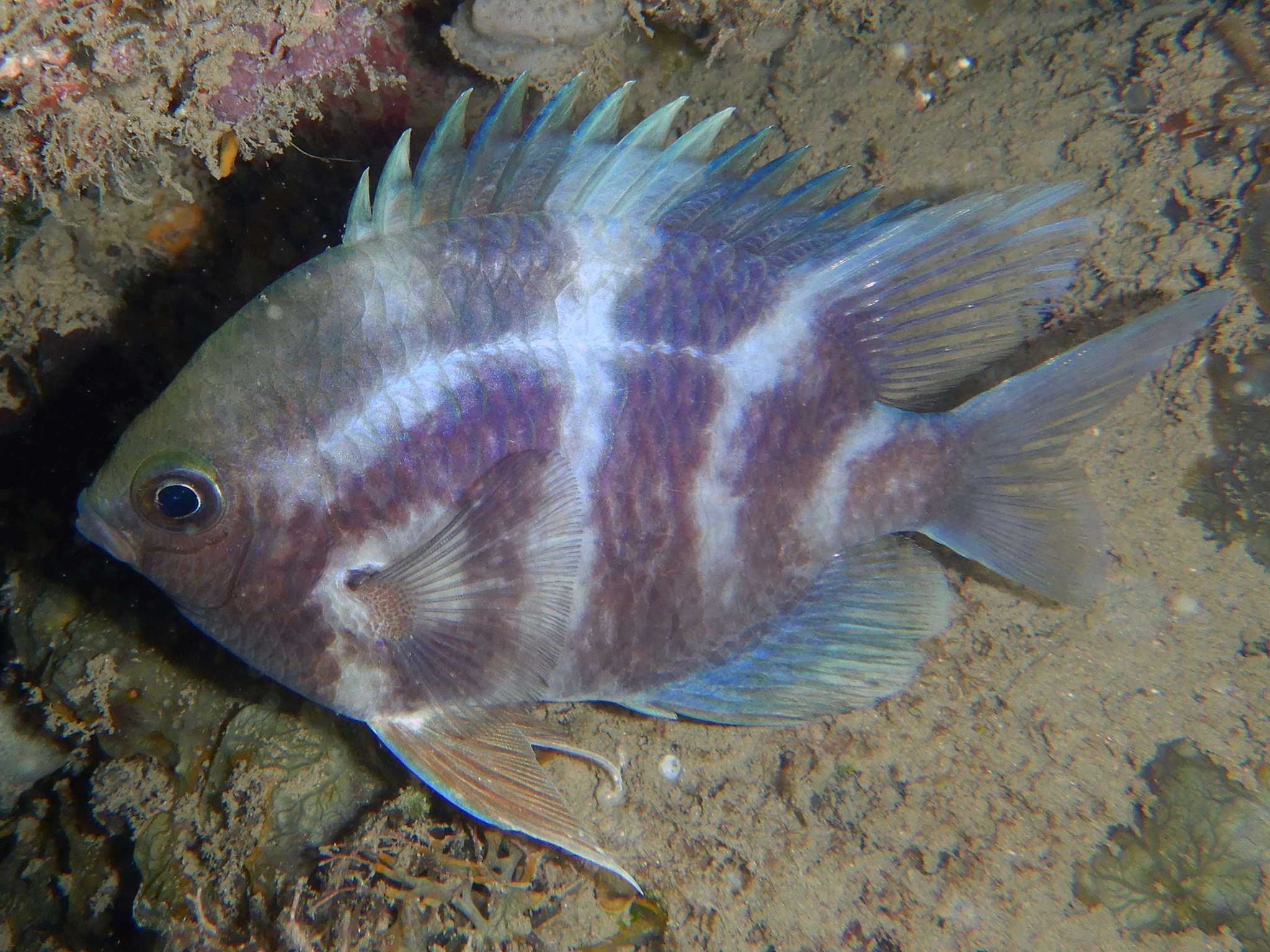
Nocturnal colouration, in Kenya
