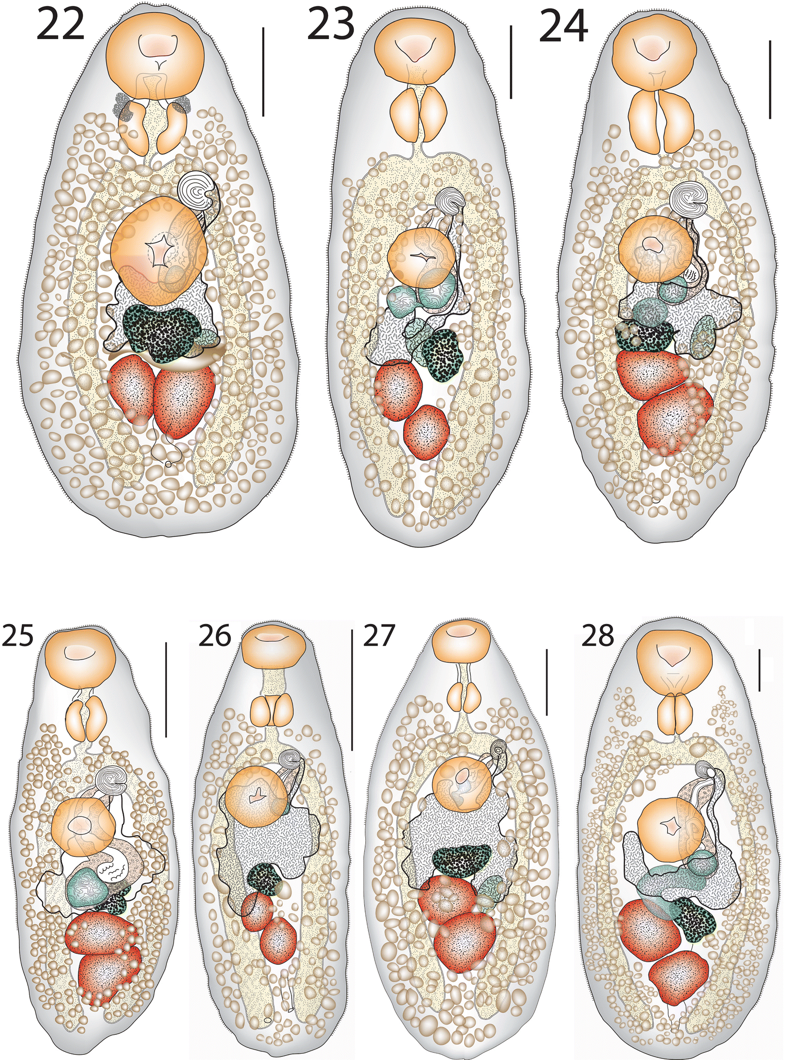
- Various species of Lepotrema

Scientific classification
- Kingdom: Animalia
- Phylum: Platyhelminthes
- Class: Trematoda
- Order: Plagiorchiida
- Superfamily: Lepocreadioidea
- Family: Lepocreadiidae
- Genus: Lepotrema; Ozaki, 1932

= Lepotrema =

Genus of flukes

Lepotrema is a genus of trematodes in the family Lepocreadiidae.

Species of this genus are encountered in a wide range of fish families in the orders Tetraodontiformes and Perciformes, with one record from a Pleuronectiformes.

== Species ==
The following species are included in the genus, according to the World Register of Marine Species:

- Lepotrema acanthochromidis Bray, Cutmore & Cribb, 2018
- Lepotrema adlardi (Bray, Cribb & Barker, 1993) Bray & Cribb, 1996
- Lepotrema amansis Bray, Cutmore & Cribb, 2018
- Lepotrema amblyglyphidodonis Bray, Cutmore & Cribb, 2018
- Lepotrema canthescheniae Bray & Cribb, 1996
- Lepotrema cirripectis Bray, Cutmore & Cribb, 2018
- Lepotrema clavatum Ozaki, 1932
- Lepotrema cylindricum (Wang, 1989) Bray, Cutmore & Cribb, 2018
- Lepotrema hemitaurichthydis Bray, Cutmore & Cribb, 2018
- Lepotrema incisum (Hanson, 1955) Bray & Cribb, 1996
- Lepotrema justinei Bray, Cutmore & Cribb, 2018
- Lepotrema melichthydis Bray, Cutmore & Cribb, 2018
- Lepotrema monile Bray & Cribb, 1998
- Lepotrema moretonense Bray, Cutmore & Cribb, 2018
- Lepotrema navodonis (Shen, 1986) Bray, Cutmore & Cribb, 2018
- Lepotrema xanthichthydis (Yamaguti, 1970) Bray & Cribb, 1996
