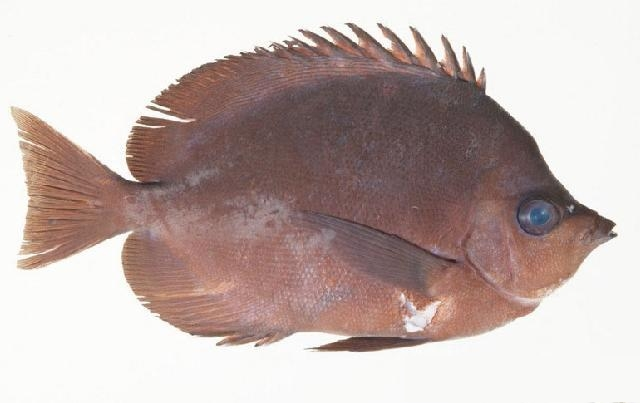

Conservation status
- Least Concern (IUCN 3.1)

Scientific classification
- Kingdom: Animalia
- Phylum: Chordata
- Class: Actinopterygii
- Order: Acanthuriformes
- Family: Chaetodontidae
- Genus: Hemitaurichthys
- Species: H. thompsoni

Binomial name
- Hemitaurichthys thompsoni Fowler, 1923

= Hemitaurichthys thompsoni =

Species of fish

Hemitaurichthys thompsoni, Thompson's butterflyfish, is a species of marine ray-finned fish, a butterflyfish belonging to the family Chaetodontidae. It is found in the Pacific Ocean.

== Description ==
Hemitaurichthys thompsoni is a medium-sized butterflyfish, the body is uniformly bluish grey in colour and it has the typical short snout and compressed body of species within the genus Hemitaurichthys. The dorsal fin contains 12 spines and 25-17 soft rays while the anal fin has 3 spines and 20-21 soft rays. This fish attains a maximum total length of 16 centimetres (6.3 in).

== Distribution ==
Hemitaurichthys thompsoni is found throughout most of Oceania, from the Bonin Islands, Guam and the Northern Mariana Islands, Taongi and Wake Atolls, southwards through Polynesia from the Hawaii and Johnston Island to Samoa, the Cook, Society and Tuamotu Islands. It may be more widely distributed.

== Habitat and biology ==
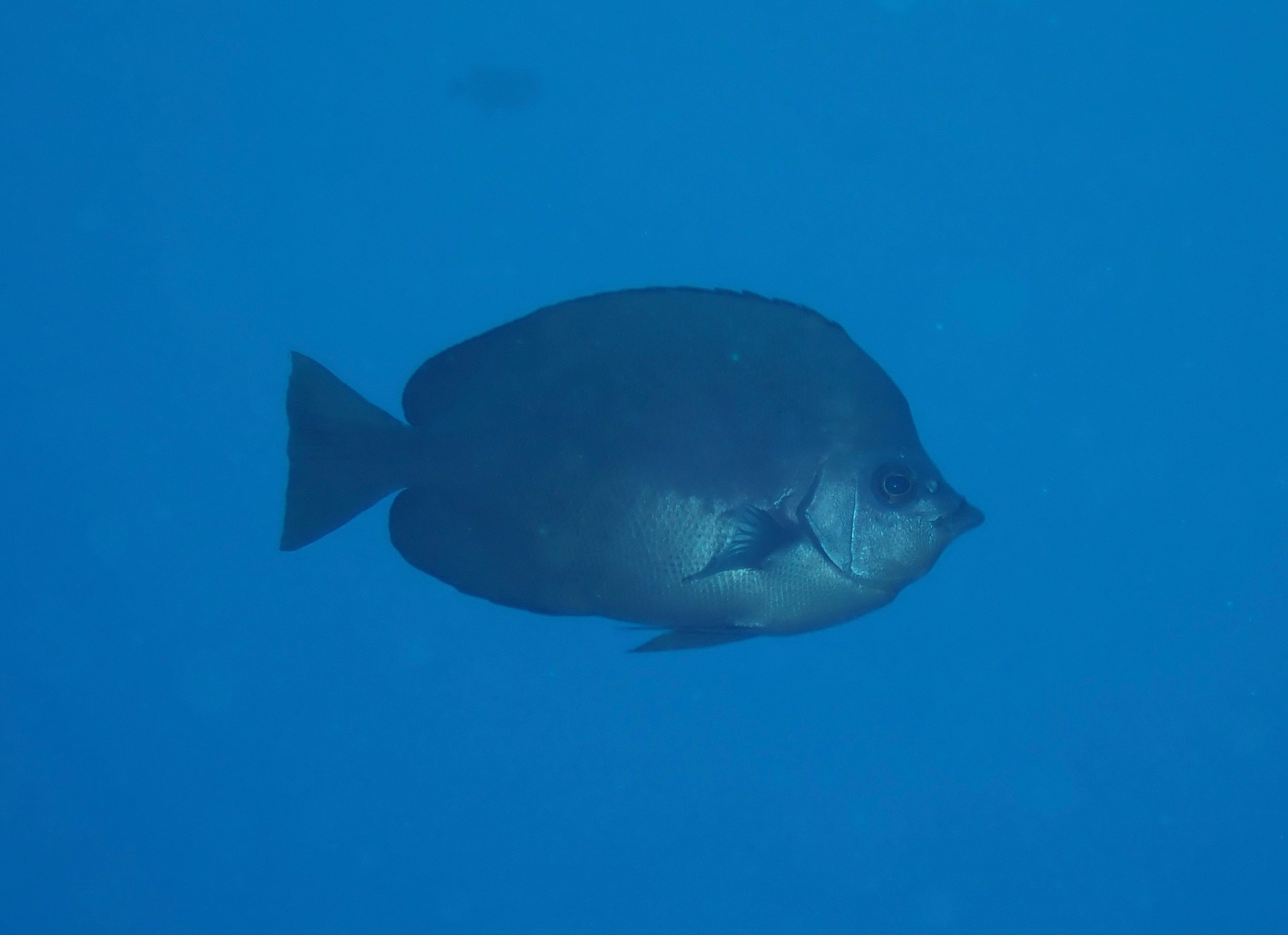
In Hawaii

Hemitaurichthys thompsoni occurs on coral reefs where it is usually observed on the outer-reef, the fore-reef slopes and at drop-offs. It can be found at depths between 4 and 300 metres (13 and 984 ft). It aggregates in schools high in the water column. It is an omnivorous species which feeds on plankton, although they mostly feed on zooplankton, particularly copepods. They will also feed on coral. It is an oviparous species and the male and female form pairs when breeding.

== Taxonomy and etymology ==
Hemitaurichthys thompsoni was first formally described in 1923 by the American ichthyologist Henry Weed Fowler (1878–1965) with the type locality given as Honolulu Fish Market. The specific name honours the artist and modeller John W. Thompson who worked at the Bishop Museum in Honolulu between 1901 and 1928 and who purchased the type and brought it to the Museum. This species has been known to hybridise with the pyramid butterflyfish (H. polylepis) in Hawaii.

== Utilisation ==
Hemitaurichthys thompsoni is collected for the aquarium trade on a limited basis. However, its rather plain and relatively dull colouration mean that it is not as popular as related species of butterflyfish.
