= Many-spined butterflyfish =

Conservation status
- Least Concern (IUCN 3.1)

Scientific classification
- Kingdom: Animalia
- Phylum: Chordata
- Class: Actinopterygii
- Order: Acanthuriformes
- Family: Chaetodontidae
- Genus: Hemitaurichthys
- Species: H. multispinosus

Binomial name
- Hemitaurichthys multispinosus Randall, 1975

Synonyms
- Hemitaurichthys multispinus Burgess & Randall, 1978

Species of fish

The many-spined butterflyfish (Hemitaurichthys multispinosus), also known as the multispine butterflyfish or spiny butterflyfish, is a species of marine ray-finned fish, a butterflyfish from the family Chaetodontidae, which is associated with deeper reefs around three island groups in the southern central Pacific Ocean.

== Description ==
The many-spined butterflyfish is a rather drab uniform grey colour. It has 14-16 spines in its dorsal fin and 5 spines in the anal fin. The maximum recorded length of this species is 20.8 centimetres (8.2 in).

== Distribution ==
The many-spined butterflyfish is found only around a few island groups in the southern Pacific Ocean. It has been recorded from the British overseas territory of Pitcairn Island, Easter Island in Chile and, a single island in the Austral Islands, Rurutu, in French Polynesia.

== Habitat and biology ==
The many-spined butterflyfish occurs on deep seaward coral reefs where it aggregates into schools varying in size from small to large in the middle of the water column at depths between 30 and 50 metres (98 and 164 ft). It feeds on plankton. It is an oviparous species in which the males and females form pairs for breeding.

== Taxonomy ==
The many-spined butterflyfish was first formally described in 1975 by the American ichthyologist John Ernest Randall (1924-2020) with the type locality given as the Patch reef off the Gannet Ridge on the northern side Pitcairn Island.

== Utilisation ==
The many-spined butterflyfish is almost unknown in the aquarium trade. Local fishermen collect this species for food using spears and the piscicide rotenone.
