= Acanthogalea =

Scientific classification
- Kingdom: Animalia
- Phylum: Platyhelminthes
- Class: Trematoda
- Order: Plagiorchiida
- Superfamily: Lepocreadioidea
- Family: Lepocreadiidae
- Genus: Acanthogalea; Gibson, 1976

Genus of flukes

Acanthogalea is a genus of trematodes in the family Lepocreadiidae.

== Species ==
The following species are included in the genus, according to the World Register of Marine Species:

- Acanthogalea gibsoni Gaevskaya, 1983
- Acanthogalea palinurichthydis Gibson, 1976
