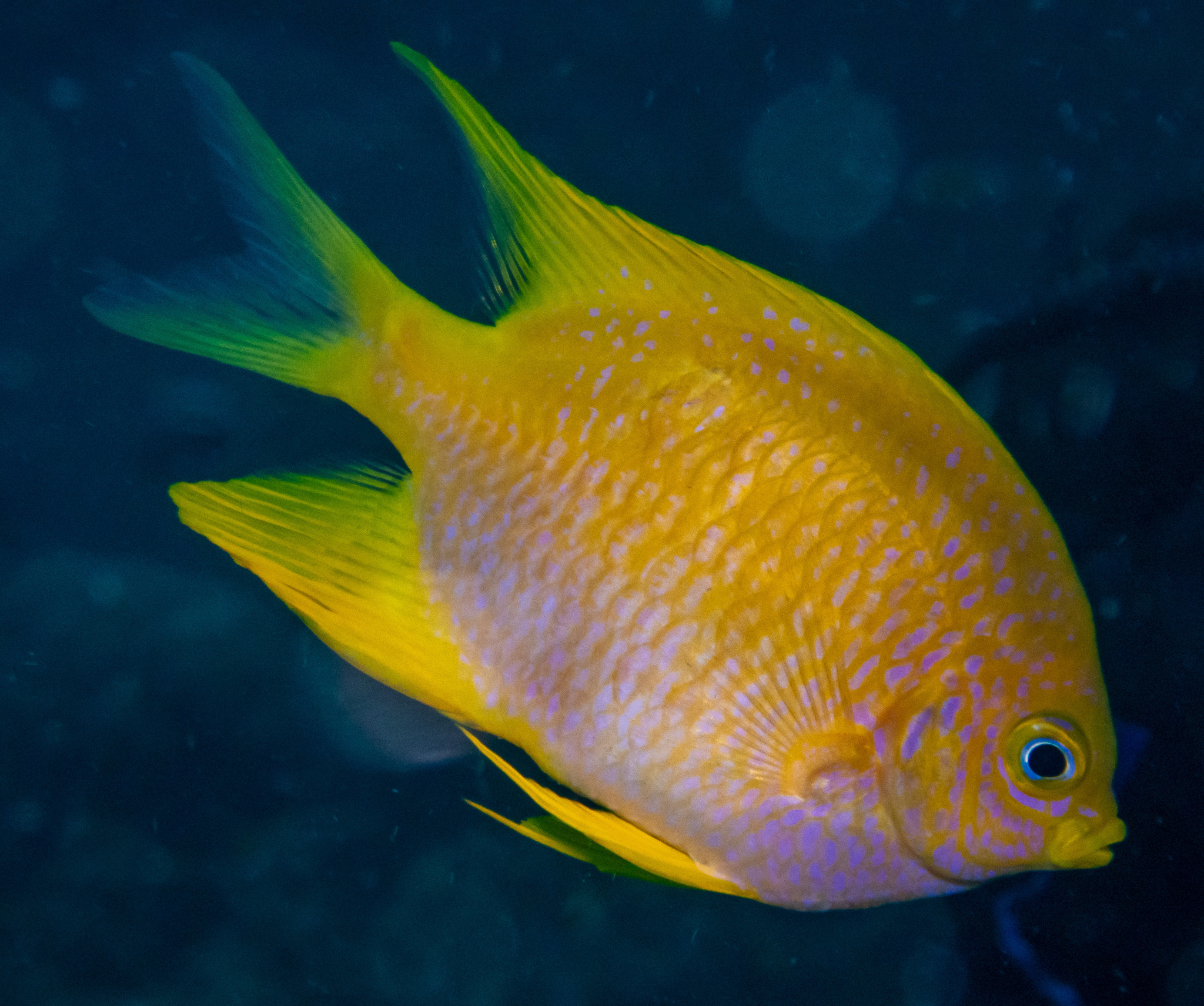
- In Thailand

Conservation status
- Least Concern (IUCN 3.1)

Scientific classification
- Kingdom: Animalia
- Phylum: Chordata
- Class: Actinopterygii
- Order: Blenniiformes
- Family: Pomacentridae
- Genus: Amblyglyphidodon
- Species: A. aureus

Binomial name
- Amblyglyphidodon aureus (Cuvier, 1830)

Synonyms
- Glyphisodon aureus Cuvier, 1830; Abudefduf aureus (Cuvier, 1830)

= Amblyglyphidodon aureus =

Species of fish

Amblyglyphidodon aureus, known as the golden damselfish or golden sergeant, is a marine ray-finned fish in the family Pomacentridae, the damselfishes and clownfishes. It is native to the central Indo-Pacific.

== Description ==
This fish reaches 13 cm (5.1 in) in length. It is yellow with blue or purple spots on its face, and some individuals have a dark diffuse blotch on the flanks.

== Biology ==
The fish typically inhabits steep outer reef slopes where gorgonians and black corals are abundant, and is occasionally found in deep lagoons and channel walls. During breeding, the female lays eggs on gorgonians, and the male guards and tends them until they hatch. The diet is made up of zooplankton, and this fish is either solitary or lives in small groups.

== Gallery ==
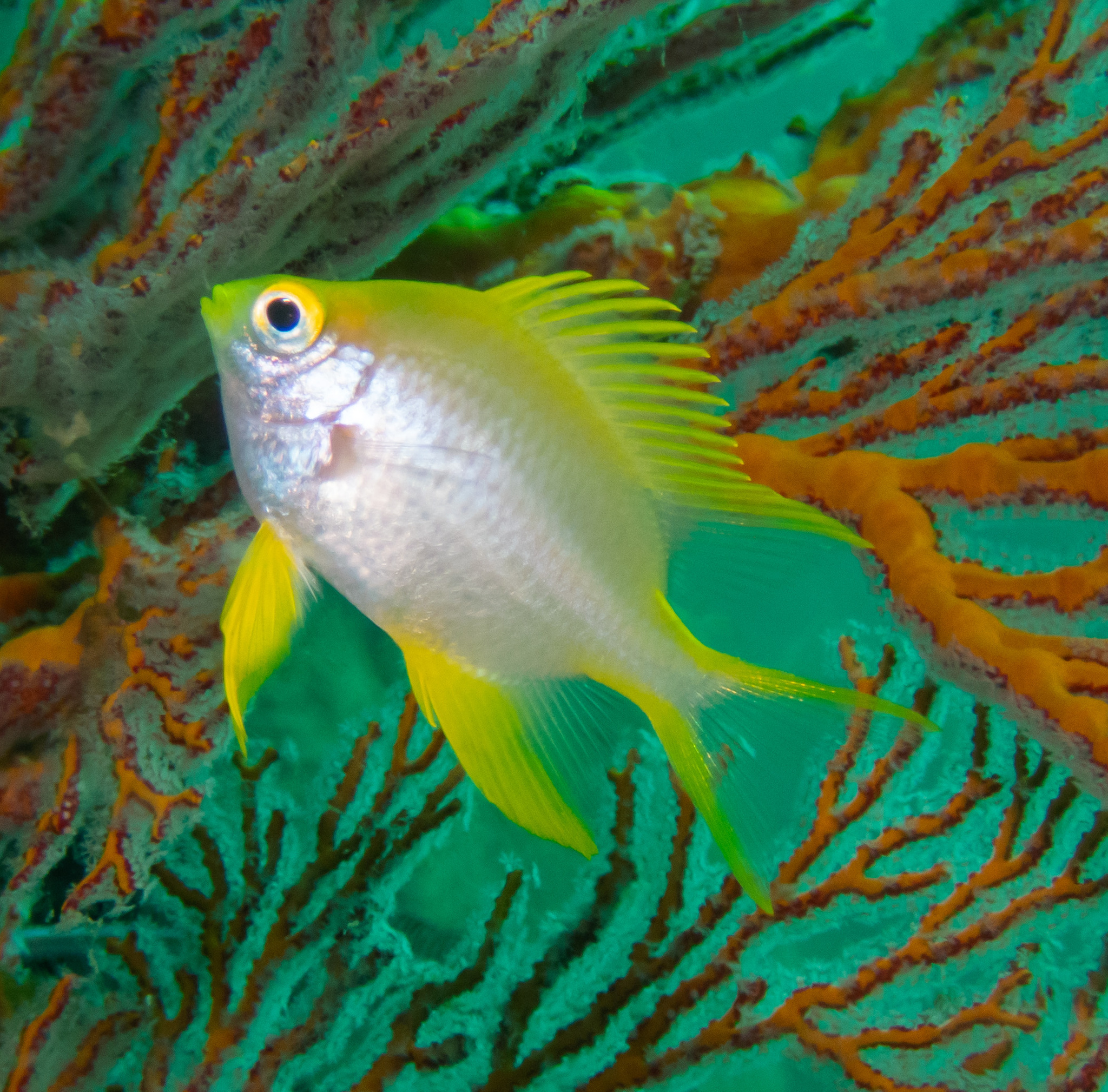
Juvenile

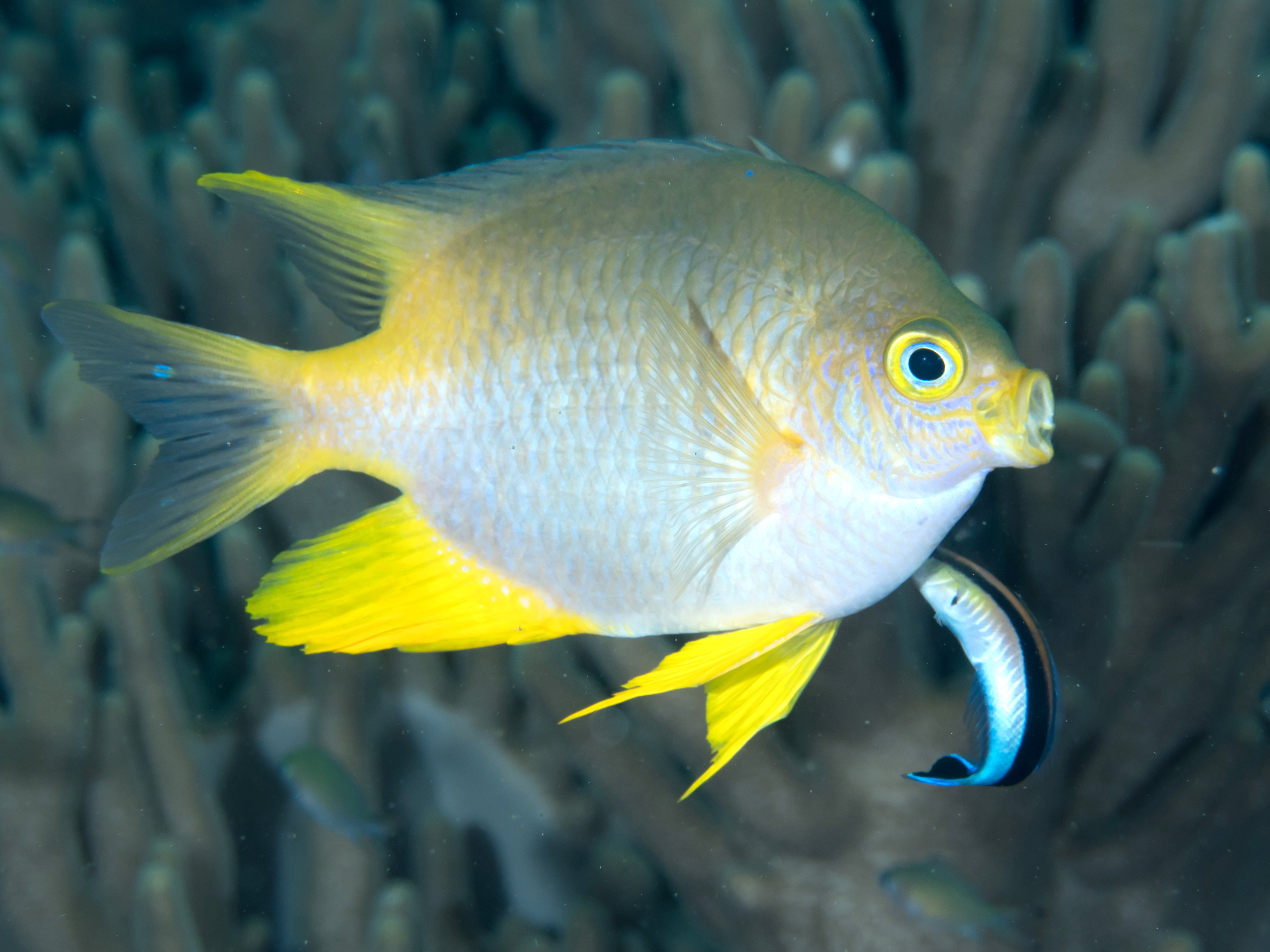
Attended by a bluestreak cleaner wrasse

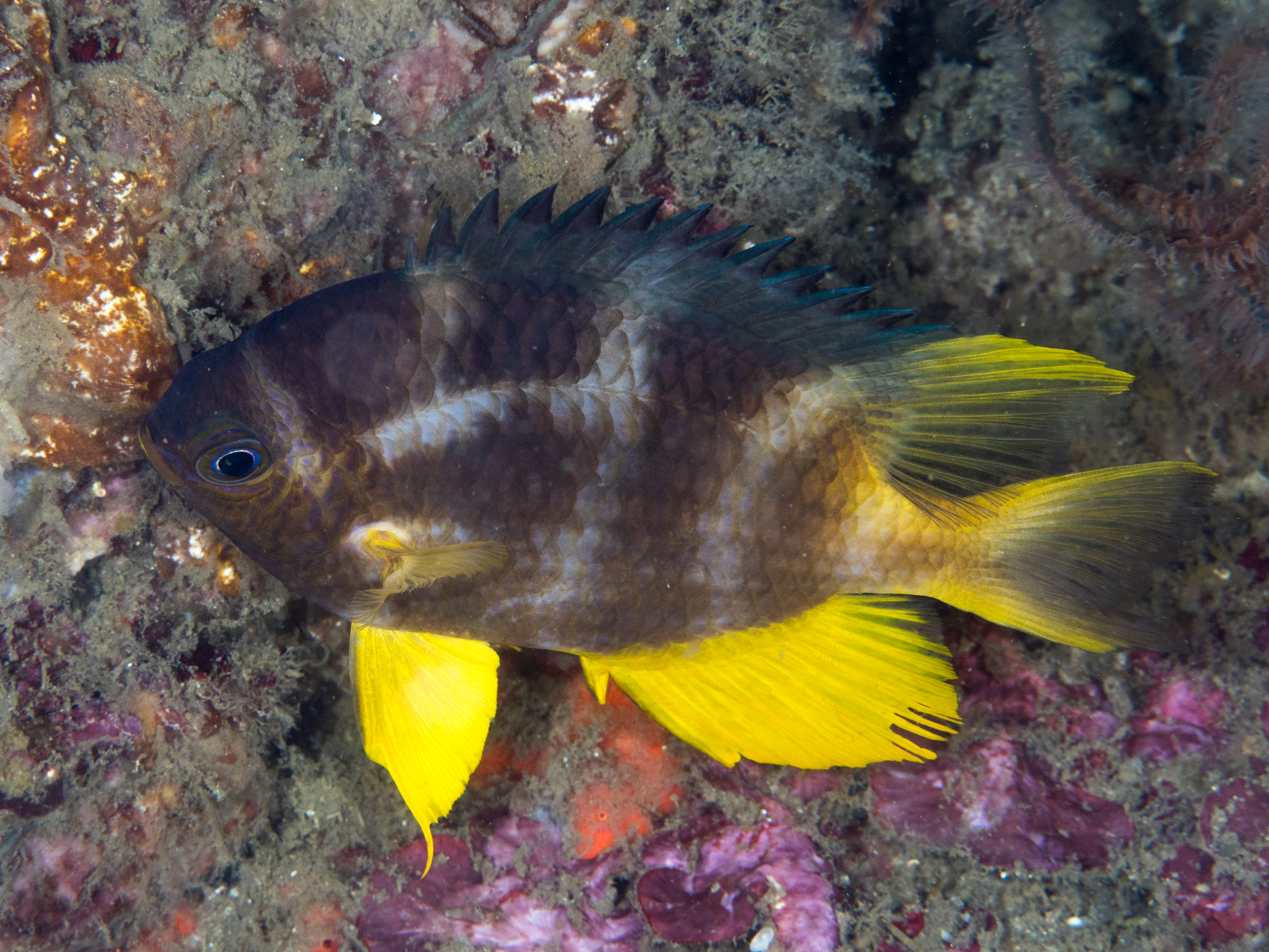
Night time colouration

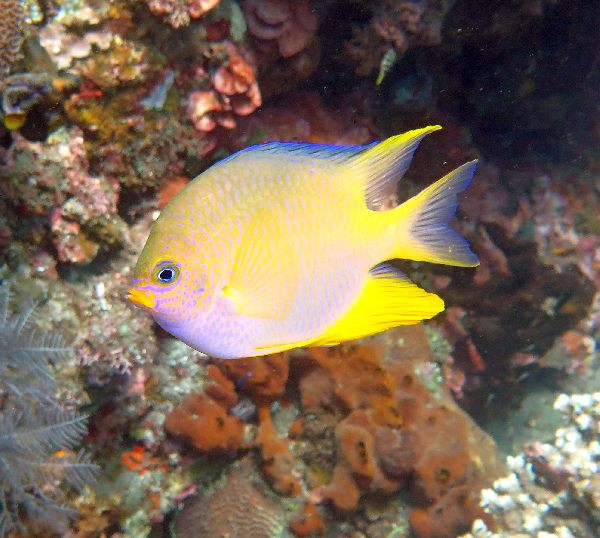
In Bali
