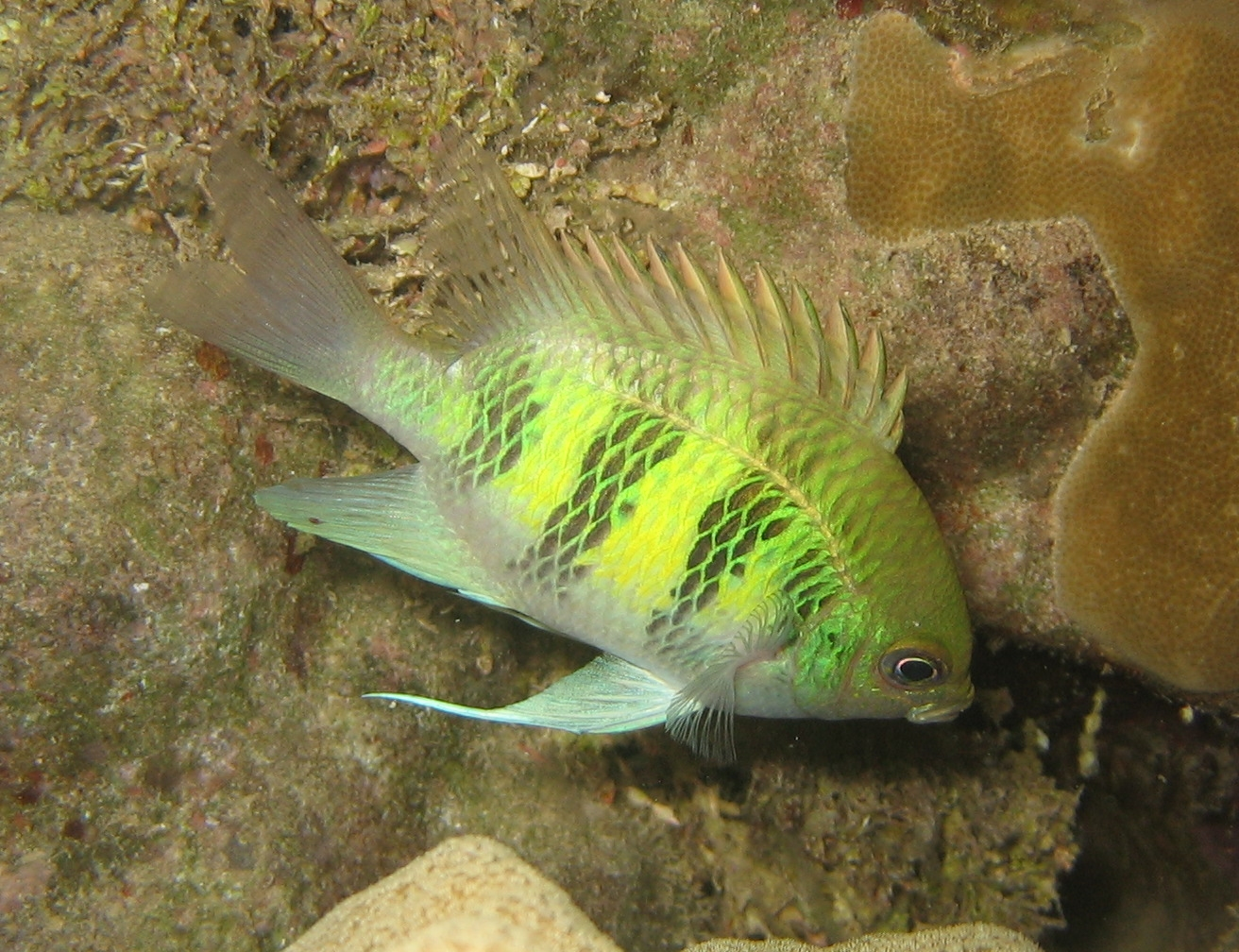

Conservation status
- Least Concern (IUCN 3.1)

Scientific classification
- Kingdom: Animalia
- Phylum: Chordata
- Class: Actinopterygii
- Order: Blenniiformes
- Family: Pomacentridae
- Genus: Amblyglyphidodon
- Species: A. curacao

Binomial name
- Amblyglyphidodon curacao (Bloch, 1787)

Synonyms
- Abudefduf curacao (Bloch, 1787); Abudefduf trifasciatus (Bleeker, 1847); Amblyglyphisodon nudirostrum Fowler, 1944; Ambyglyphidodon curacao (Bloch, 1787); Chaetodon curacao Bloch, 1787; Glyphisodon smaragdinus Brevoort, 1856; Glyphisodon trifasciatus Bleeker, 1847

= Amblyglyphidodon curacao =

Species of fish

Amblyglyphidodon curacao; also known as the staghorn damselfish , the clouded damselfish or the black-snouted sergeant major is a species of marine fish in the family Pomacentridae, the damselfishes and the clownfishes. It is widespread throughout the tropical waters of the western Pacific Ocean. This species is a small sized fish that can reach a maximum size of 11 cm (4.3 in) length.
