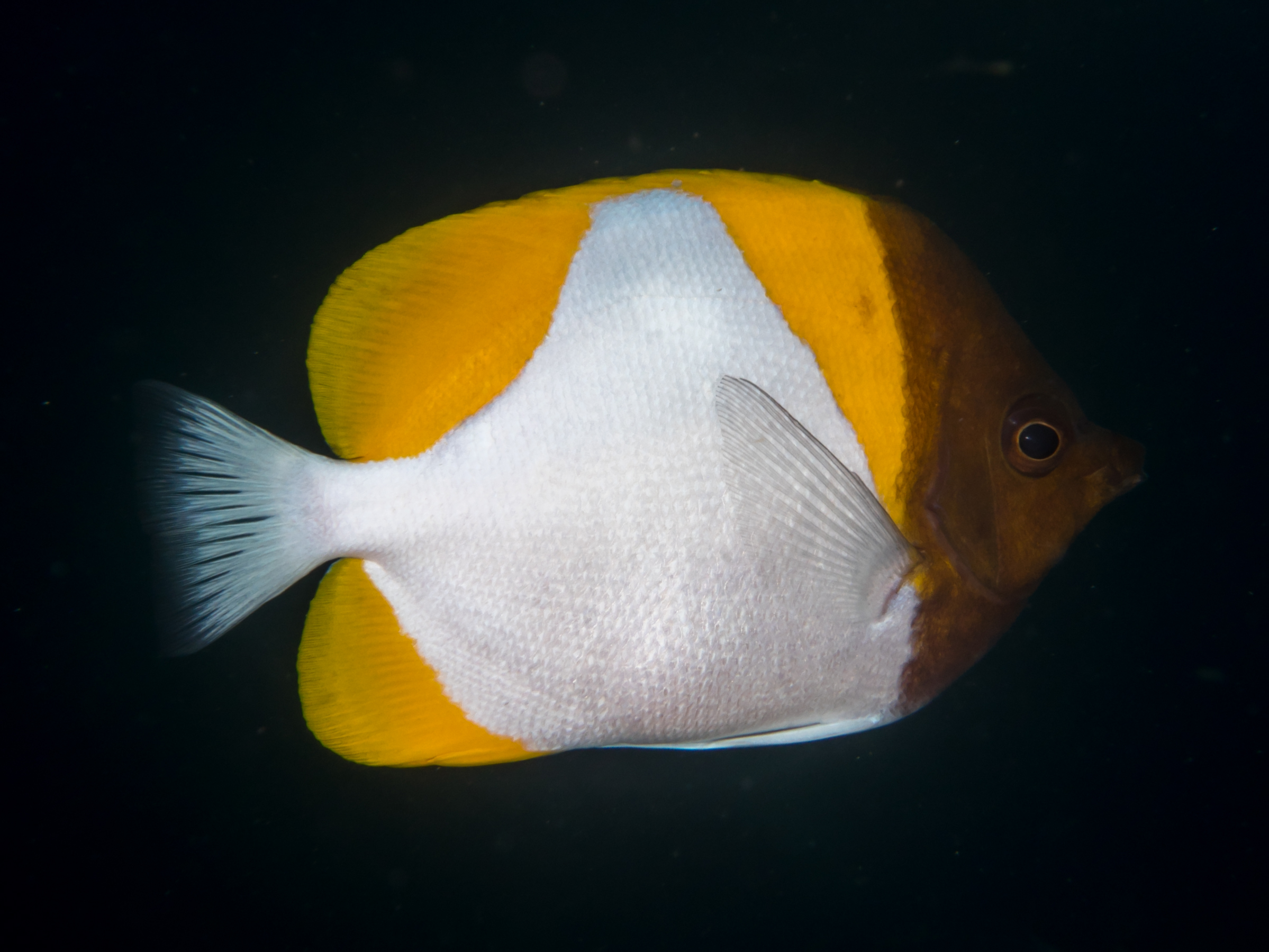

Conservation status
- Least Concern (IUCN 3.1)

Scientific classification
- Kingdom: Animalia
- Phylum: Chordata
- Class: Actinopterygii
- Order: Acanthuriformes
- Family: Chaetodontidae
- Genus: Hemitaurichthys
- Species: H. polylepis

Binomial name
- Hemitaurichthys polylepis (Bleeker, 1857)

Synonyms
- Chaetodon polylepis Bleeker, 1857

= Pyramid butterflyfish =

Species of fish

The pyramid butterflyfish (Hemitaurichthys polylepis) is a species of marine ray-finned fish, a butterflyfish belonging to the family Chaetodontidae, native from central Indo-Pacific.

== Description ==
The pyramid butterflyfish is a small-sized fish that can reach a maximum length of 18 cm.

Its body is compressed laterally with a rounded body profile, and its snout protrudes forwards slightly with a small protrusible (extendable) mouth. Its very characteristic livery leaves no doubt about the identification. A dark brown-yellow area, the colour of which may vary in intensity, fully masks the head and extends to a line from the first rays of the dorsal fin to the start of its pelvic fins.

The rest of its body is white, peduncle and caudal fin included. Insertion of yellow-orange areas at the top of the side form a characteristic pyramidal pattern, hence the name of the fish. The anal fin is also yellow-orange.

== Distribution and habitat ==
The pyramid butterflyfish is widespread throughout the tropical and subtropical waters of the central Indo-Pacific from Cocos Keeling and Christmas Island to Polynesia and from south Japan to New-Caledonia.

The pyramid butterflyfish appreciates the outer reef slopes from which it can swim out into open water to get its food. It can be seen at depths from 3 to 60 meters deep.

== Biology ==
The pyramid butterflyfish lives in large schools, and feeds on plankton in open water out of its shelter reef.

== Conservation status ==
The species as a planktivorous could be affected by climate-induced reductions in planktonic productivity. There do not appear to be any current threats to this species and it is listed as Least Concern (LC) by the IUCN.
