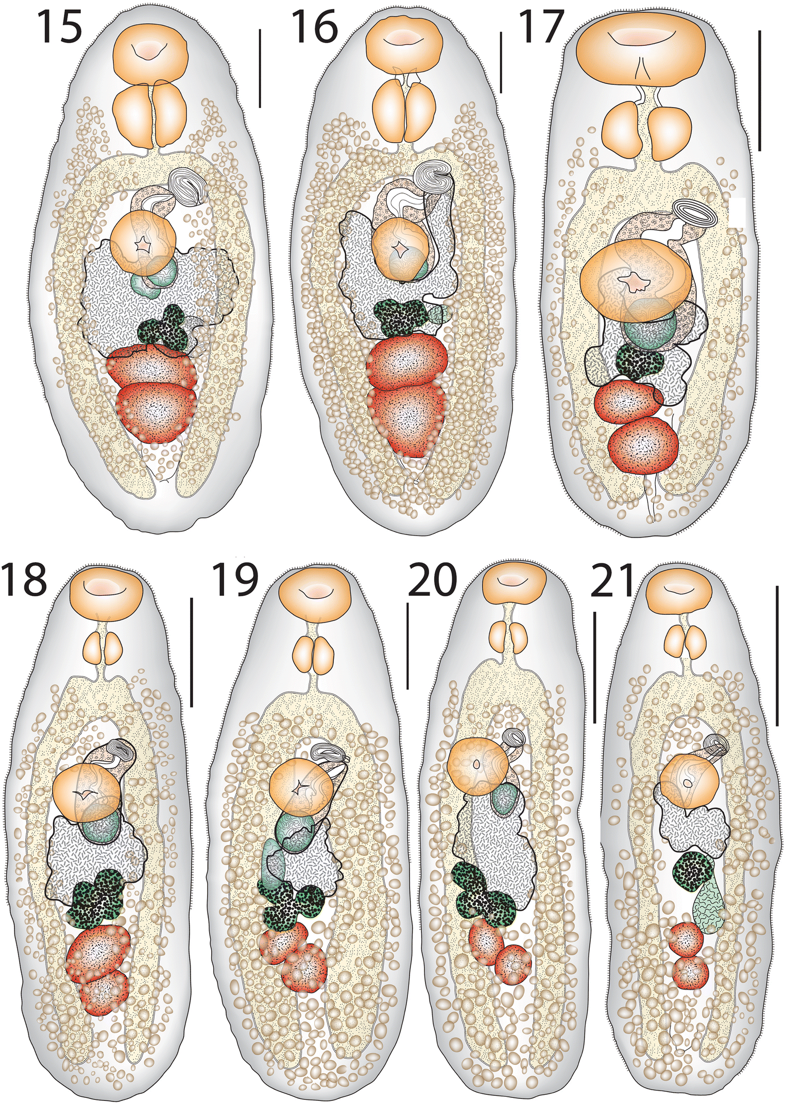
- Various species of Lepotrema

Scientific classification
- Kingdom: Animalia
- Phylum: Platyhelminthes
- Class: Trematoda
- Order: Plagiorchiida
- Suborder: Lepocreadiata
- Superfamily: Lepocreadioidea
- Family: Lepocreadiidae; Odhner, 1905

= Lepocreadiidae =

Family of flukes

Lepocreadiidae is a family of trematodes in the order Plagiorchiida.

== Genera ==
According to the World Register of Marine Species, the family includes the following valid genera:

- Acanthogalea Gibson, 1976
- Amphicreadium Bray & Cribb, 2001
- Bianium Stunkard, 1930
- Cephalolepidapedon Yamaguti, 1970
- Clavogalea Bray, 1985
- Cliveus Bray & Cribb, 1997
- Cotylocreadium Madhavi, 1972
- Deraiotrema Machida, 1982
- Dermadena Manter, 1945
- Dihemistephanus Looss, 1901
- Diplocreadium Park, 1939
- Diploproctia Mamaev, 1970
- Diploproctodaeoides Reimer, 1981
- Diploproctodaeum La Rue, 1926
- Echeneidocoelium Simha & Pershad, 1964
- Gibsonius Hassanine, 2005
- Hypocreadium Ozaki, 1936
- Hypoporus Wang, 1989
- Lepidapedoides Yamaguti, 1970
- Lepocreadioides Yamaguti, 1936
- Lepocreadium Stossich, 1904
- Lepotrema Ozaki, 1932
- Lobatocreadium Madhavi, 1972
- Lutianotrema Singh, Singh & Singh, 2004
- Mobahincia Bray, Cribb & Cutmore, 2018
- Multitestis Manter, 1931
- Multitestoides Yamaguti, 1971
- Neodiploproctodaeum Bilqees, Khalil, Khan & Haseeb, 2012
- Neohypocreadium Machida & Uchida, 1987
- Neolabrifer Pritchard, 1972
- Neolepidapedoides Yamaguti, 1971
- Neomultitestis Machida, 1982
- Neopreptetos Machida, 1982
- Opechona Looss, 1907
- Opechonoides Yamaguti, 1940
- Opisthogonoporoides Madhavi, 1972
- Opisthogonoporus Yamaguti, 1937
- Pelopscreadium Dronen, Blend, Khalifa, Mohamadain & Karer, 2016
- Potamogenes Feng & Wang, 1993
- Preptetos Pritchard, 1960
- Prodistomum Linton, 1910
- Pseudocreadium Layman, 1930
- Pseudoholorchis Yamaguti, 1958
- Pseudolepocreadioides Hafeezullah, 1970
- Pseudopisthogonoporus Yamaguti, 1970
- Rhagorchis Manter, 1931
- Rugocavum Bray & Cribb, 1997
- Transversocreadium Hafeezullah, 1970
- Trigonotrema Goto & Ozaki, 1929
