= C. formosa =

C. formosa may refer to:

- Callipero formosa, a longhorn beetle
- Callista formosa, the floral emblem of Ranong Province, Thailand
- Calocitta formosa, a Central American jay
- Canna formosa, a garden plant
- Carcelia formosa, a tachina fly
- Cephalopholis formosa, a Pacific grouper
- Chacodelphys formosa, a didelphimorph marsupial
- Chloromyia formosa, a soldier fly
- Chrysanympha formosa, a North American moth
- Cirrimaxilla formosa, a saltwater eel
- Clavus formosa, a sea snail
- Coris formosa, a wrasse native to the Indian Ocean
- Cosmopterix formosa, a cosmet moth
- Crematogaster formosa, a cocktail ant
- Cuspivolva formosa, a sea snail
- Cyprinella formosa, a ray-finned fish
