= Callipero bella =

Scientific classification
- Kingdom: Animalia
- Phylum: Arthropoda
- Class: Insecta
- Order: Coleoptera
- Suborder: Polyphaga
- Infraorder: Cucujiformia
- Family: Cerambycidae
- Genus: Callipero
- Species: C. bella

Binomial name
- Callipero bella Bates, 1864

Species of beetle

Callipero bella is a species of longhorn beetles of the subfamily Lamiinae. It was described by Bates in 1864, and is known from French Guiana, northwestern Brazil, and eastern Ecuador.
