= Callipero =

Scientific classification
- Kingdom: Animalia
- Phylum: Arthropoda
- Class: Insecta
- Order: Coleoptera
- Suborder: Polyphaga
- Infraorder: Cucujiformia
- Family: Cerambycidae
- Tribe: Acanthocinini
- Genus: Callipero

Genus of beetles

Callipero is a genus of beetles in the family Cerambycidae, containing the following species:

- Callipero bella Bates, 1864
- Callipero formosa Monné, 1998
