= Callipero formosa =

Scientific classification
- Kingdom: Animalia
- Phylum: Arthropoda
- Class: Insecta
- Order: Coleoptera
- Suborder: Polyphaga
- Infraorder: Cucujiformia
- Family: Cerambycidae
- Genus: Callipero
- Species: C. formosa

Binomial name
- Callipero formosa Monné, 1998

Species of beetle

Callipero formosa is a species of longhorn beetles of the subfamily Lamiinae. It was described by Miguel A. Monné in 1998, and is known from Brazil.
