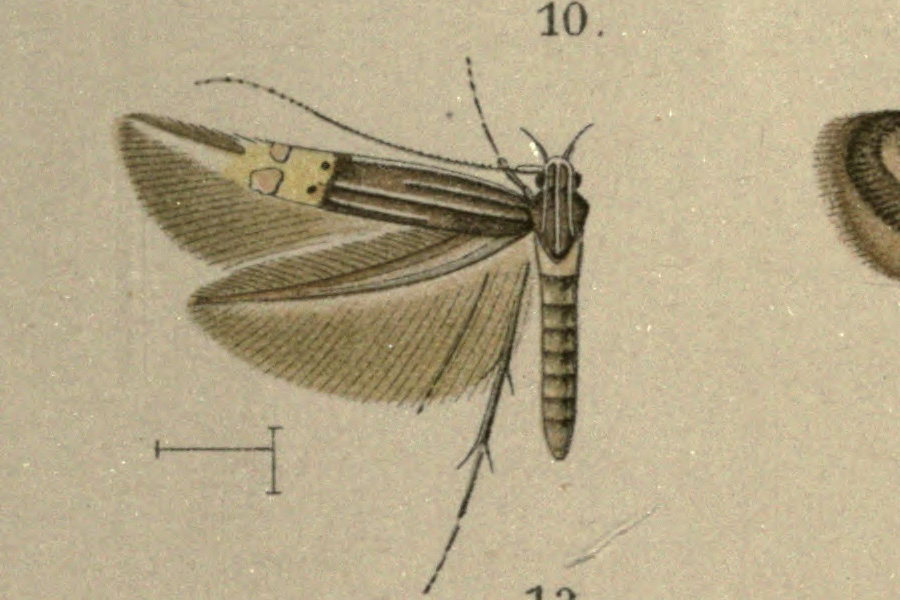

Scientific classification
- Domain: Eukaryota
- Kingdom: Animalia
- Phylum: Arthropoda
- Class: Insecta
- Order: Lepidoptera
- Family: Cosmopterigidae
- Genus: Cosmopterix
- Species: C. coryphaea

Binomial name
- Cosmopterix coryphaea (Walsingham, 1908)

Synonyms
- Cosmopteryx coryphaea Walsingham, 1908; Cosmopteryx coryphae Agenjo, 1952; Cosmopteryx donatellae Mariani, 1932; Cosmopteryx formosa Amsel, 1935

= Cosmopterix coryphaea =

Species of moth

Cosmopterix coryphaea is a moth of the family Cosmopterigidae. It is known from the Canary Islands and the Mediterranean region from Spain to Cyprus.

The wingspan is 9–10 mm.

The larvae feed on Phragmites australis. They mine the leaves of their host plant.
