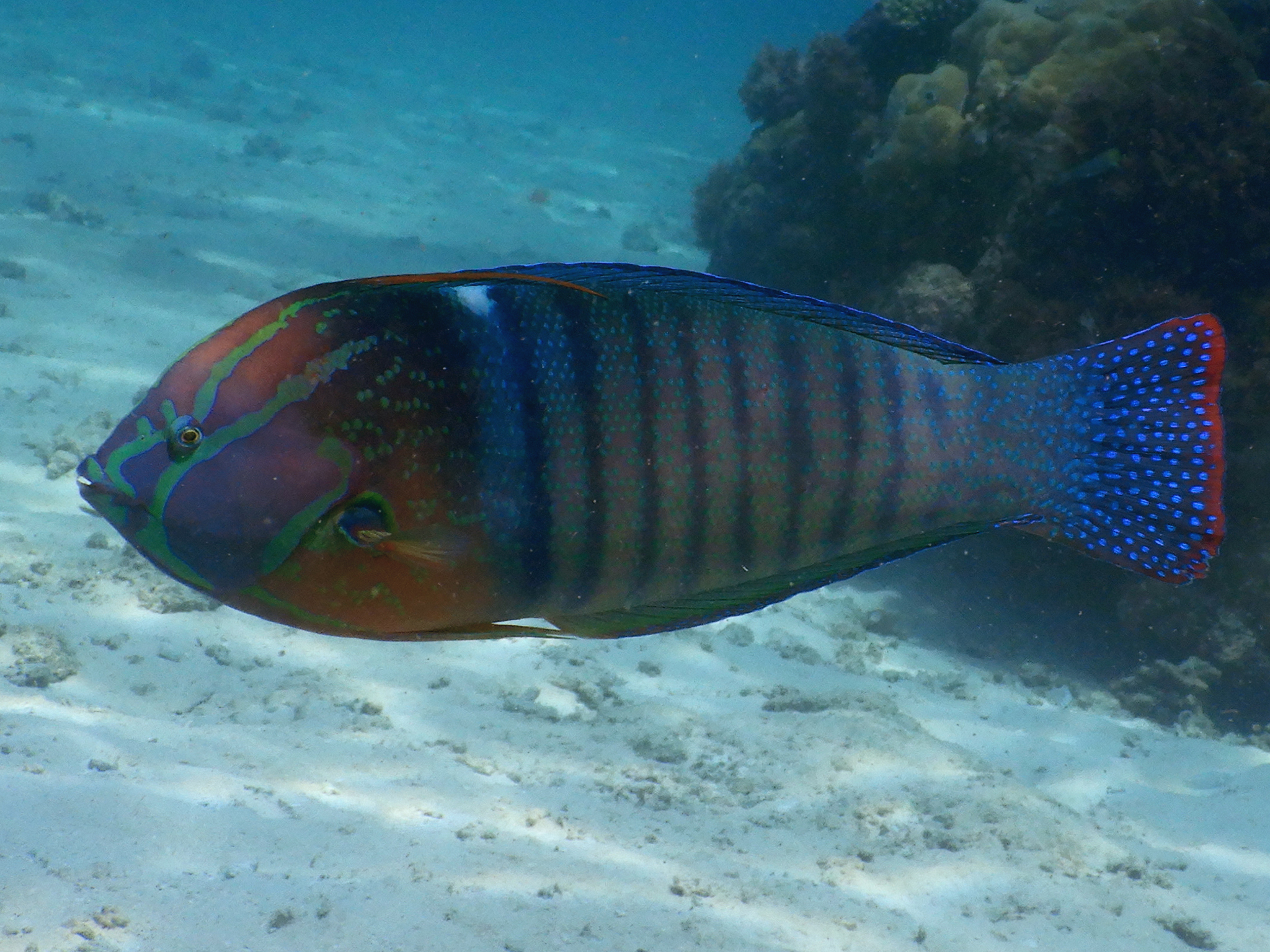
- Male
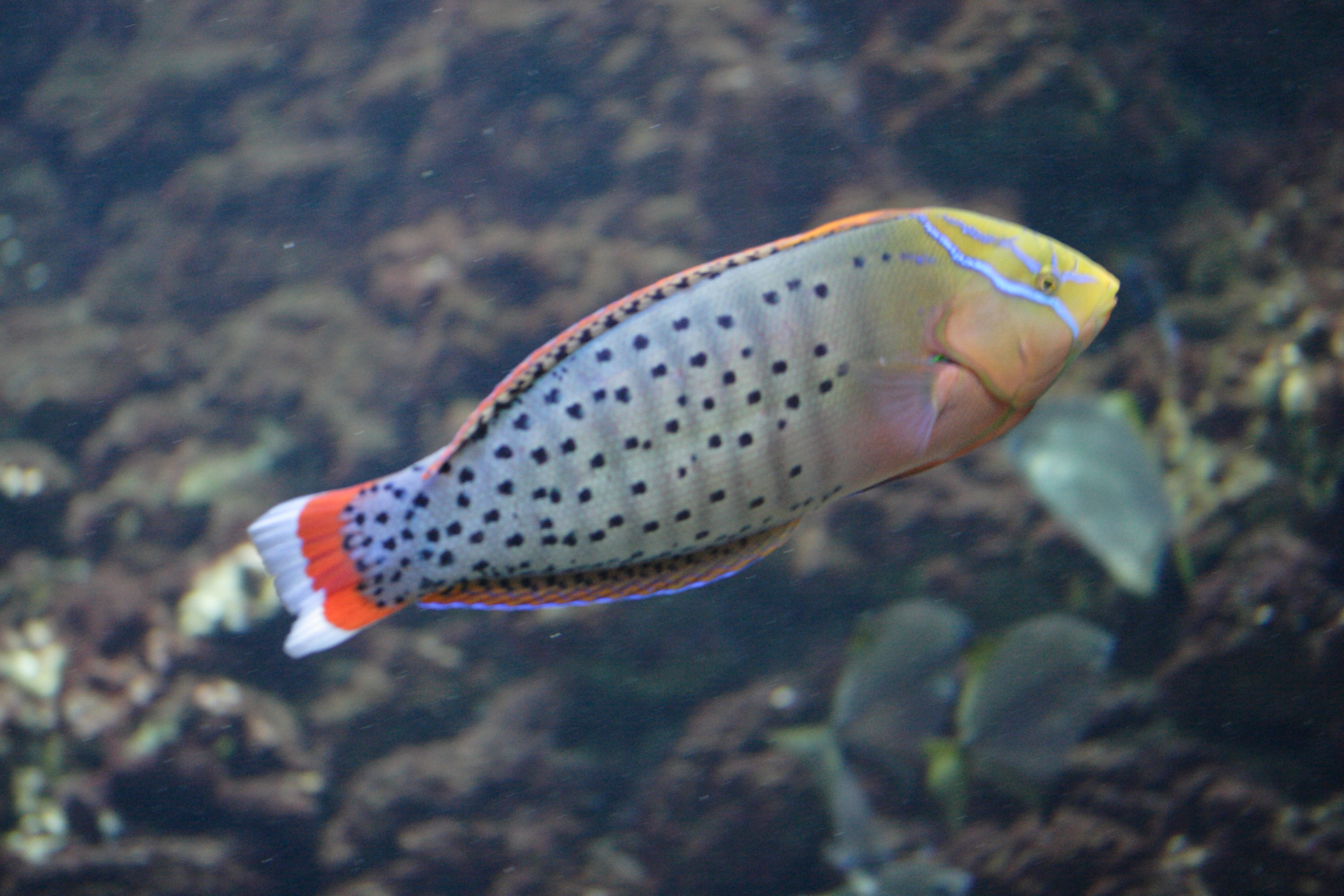
- Female

Conservation status
- Least Concern (IUCN 3.1)

Scientific classification
- Kingdom: Animalia
- Phylum: Chordata
- Class: Actinopterygii
- Order: Labriformes
- Family: Labridae
- Genus: Coris
- Species: C. formosa

Binomial name
- Coris formosa (J. W. Bennett, 1830)

Synonyms
- Labrus formosus J. W. Bennett, 1830; Coris frerei Günther, 1867; Coris halei Day, 1888

= Queen coris =

Species of fish

The queen coris (Coris formosa), also known as the sand wrasse, Queen coris wrasse, Formosan coris, Formosa coris wrasse, Formosa wrasse, Indian Ocean wrasse or Indian sand wrasse, is a species of wrasse native to the Indian Ocean from the Red Sea and the coast of east Africa to Sri Lanka. This species appears in the aquarium trade due to its vibrant colors.

== Distribution and habitat ==
Adults of this species are inhabitants of neritic oceanic coral reefs, and can be found at depths from 2 to 50 m (6.6 to 164.0 ft); meaning they are found in tropical waters within 24 °C to 27 °C. While juveniles are commonly found in tide pools, adults can be found usually in rocky, and coral areas, sometimes in vegetation. The species is distributed along the Western Indian Ocean, Southern Red Sea, South Africa, and east to Sri Lanka.

== Description ==
Similar in appearance to Coris gaimard, the queen coris can measure between the range of 20 cm (7.9 in) when young, but can grow up to approximately 60 cm (24 in). Its coloration usually varies within three different patterns. Generally it tends to be reddish to lavender in vibrant, striking color. When in adulthood, the creature appears blue-greenish, with dark edges and dark blue spots, covering the body (mainly towards the tail), with a red-orange line on its posterior margin towards the tail. Towards the rostrum, the adult queen coris will also display vibrant, light blue, organic [?] lines. The fish has nine dorsal spines, twelve dorsal soft rays, and three anal spines. When young, Coris formosa are orange and brown on the bottom, with long white spots on the dorsal part of body. One can see a resemblance to a Clown Fish's color. However, vibrant, blue features develop in adulthood. It is hypothesized that their variation on color depends on the depth at which they are found, but variation mainly results from differences between juvenile and adult stages of growth. Color is a crucial feature for Coris formosa because it is for display purposes; used to attract potential mating partners, and in combative relationships between males. The fish have small protruding teeth for feeding (mostly on hard-shelled organisms).

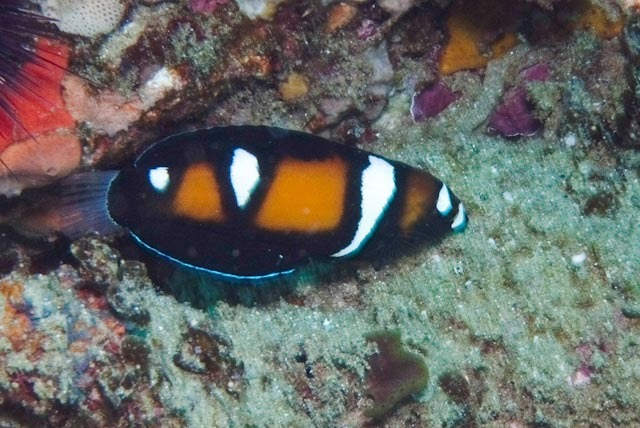
Juvenile

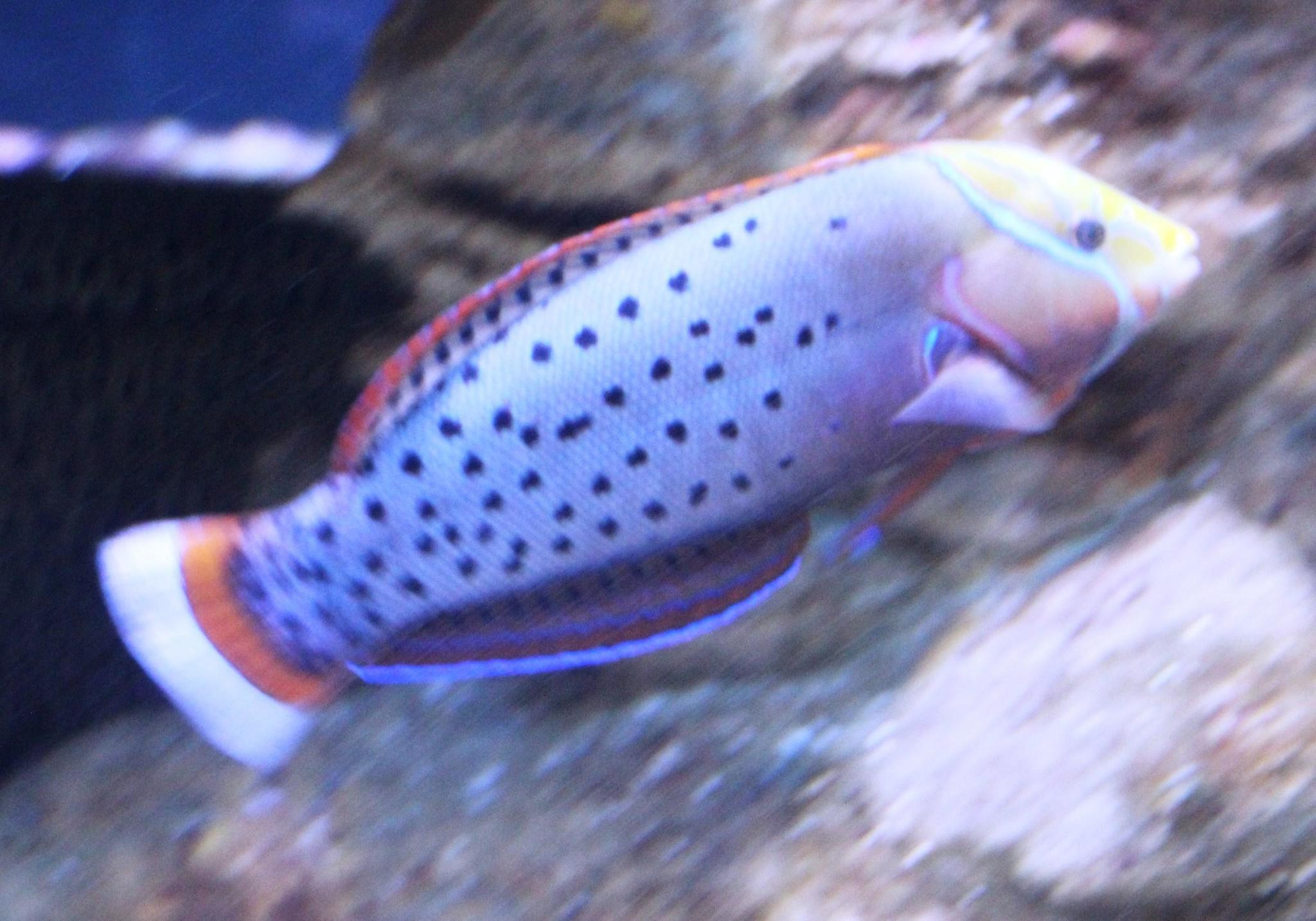
Female

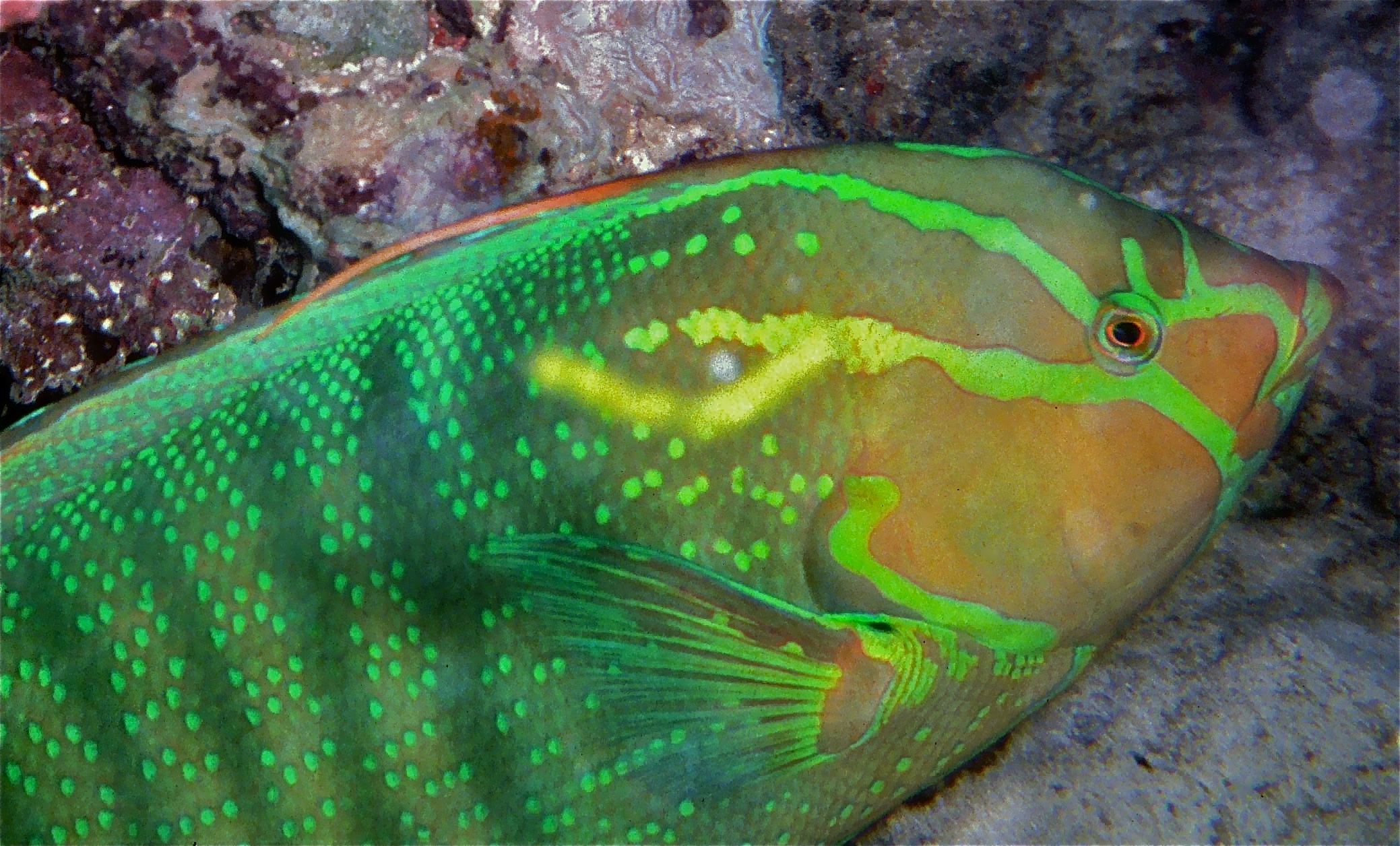
Male (terminal phase)

== Diet ==
Queen coris feed on hard-shell prey, such as crustaceans (shrimps, crabs, and amphipods) and echinoderms (sea urchin, and small molluscs). As their teeth develop in adulthood, they are very efficient in predating hard shells, and can become very aggressive and destructive. The young feed mainly on other smaller organisms, such as krill until they grow able to prey on hard-shelled organisms.

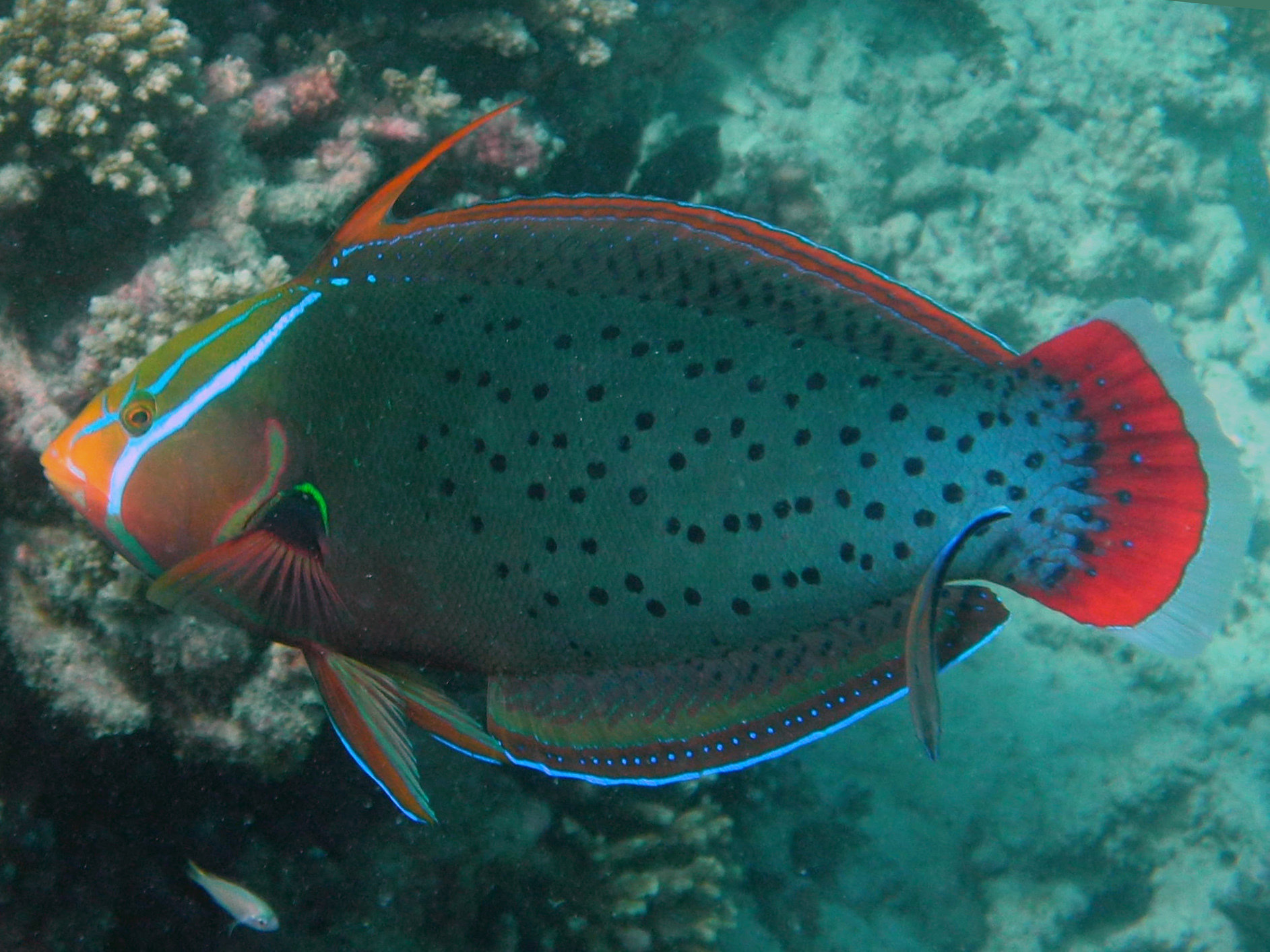
Female

== Reproduction ==
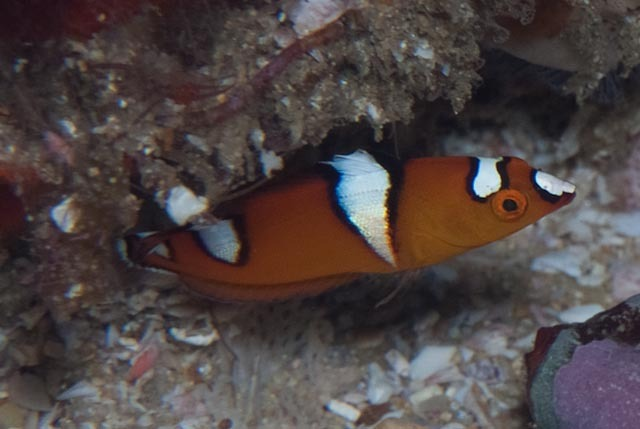
Juvenile, in South Africa

Similar to most fish, the queen coris is oviparous, which means it produces its offspring from eggs. It is a protogynous fish, meaning it is semi-hermaphrodite. A semi-hermaphrodite can change gender from female to male. In this case, a female's reproductive parts develop before its male reproductive parts, and in most cases populations are mainly female. However, when a male is needed, one of the females will switch over to male for reproduction purposes. Queen coris display polygamy or distinct pairing during breeding. Consequently, males are dominant and usually are in charge of a large female harem or various harems, especially during reproduction. This situation can occur even though coris is a solitary species. It is hypothesized that males pursue females by swimming alongside them, fluttering their fins.

== Behaviour ==
Queen coris are a very aggressive species because they are dominant, especially males during mating season. Aggression in fish is mostly territorial. The queen coris can be a threat to smaller fish, and it is a very effective invertebrate hunter. In aquariums, it has a habit of rearranging sand and rocks, and it tends to dig itself down in sandy substrate. The digging may serve various purposes. This includes breeding, as the fish may lay eggs under sand for protection. Another potential use for the digging may be in foraging for food (most of the queen coris' prey resides in sand). Digging in soft substrates to sleep, or to create a home are also potential drivers of this behaviour. The Queen coris is a solitary fish, and is extremely destructive in captivity, especially when it grows particularly large. The species requires a lot of space for swimming, and when in captivity, tends to hide under the sand during acclimatisation. When adult queen coris' are too large for the environment in a tank, they will tend to hide in small cracks between coral or rocks.

== Conservation ==
The queen coris is of minor importance to local commercial fisheries, and can also be found in the aquarium trade. The species occupy the category of least concern, with the aquarium trade posing the major threat to the species. However, this trade currently does not cause serious harm to the species. Consequently, there is currently a very low risk of extinction.

== Gallery ==
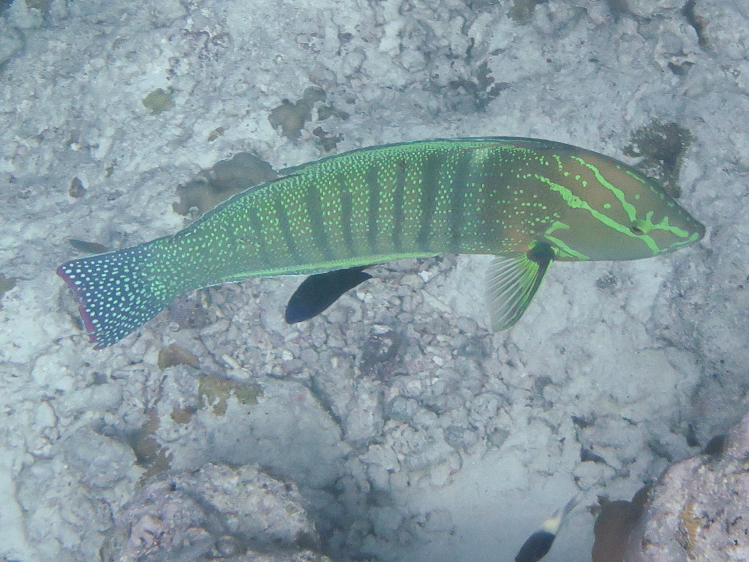
Male

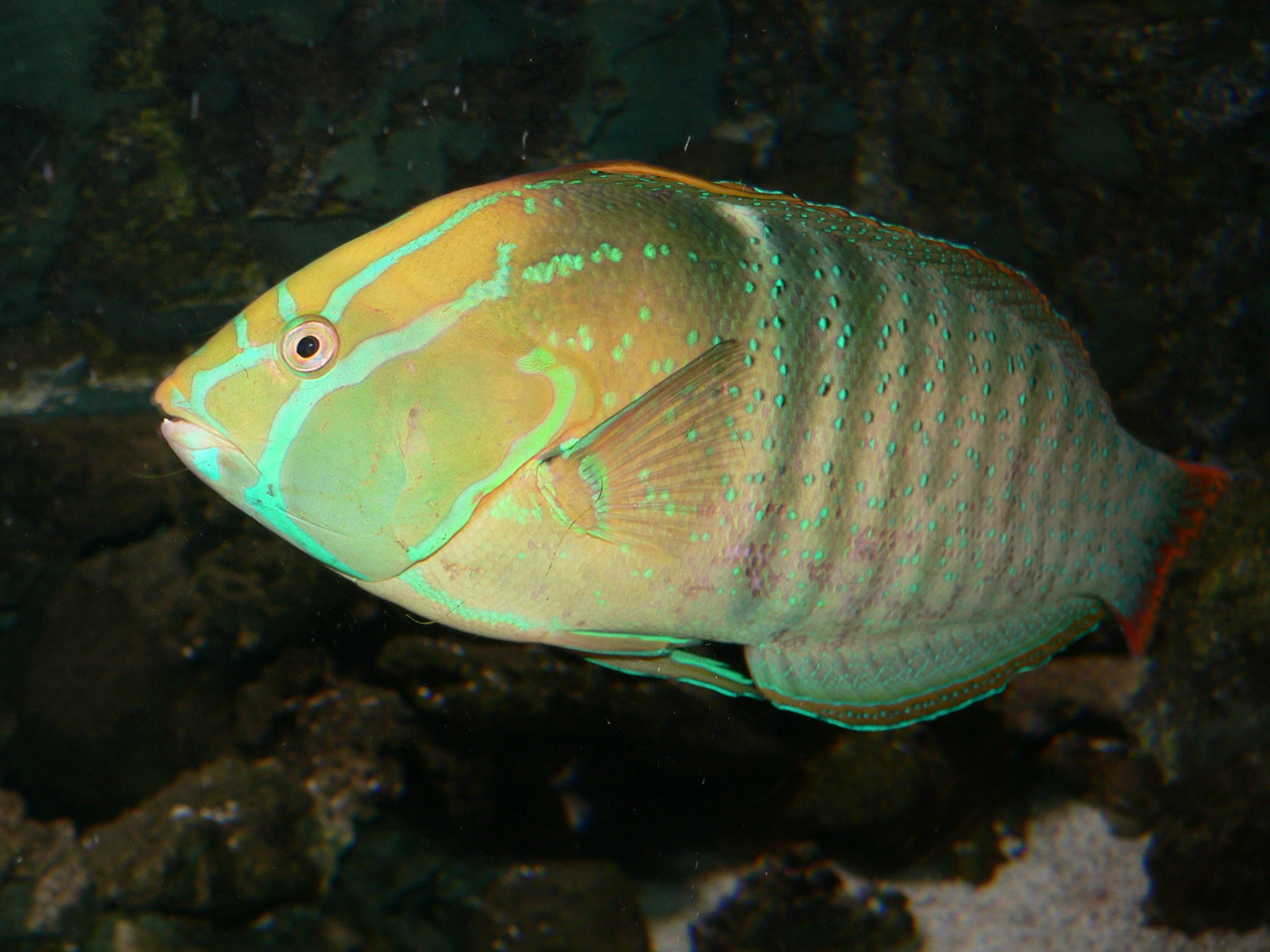
Male

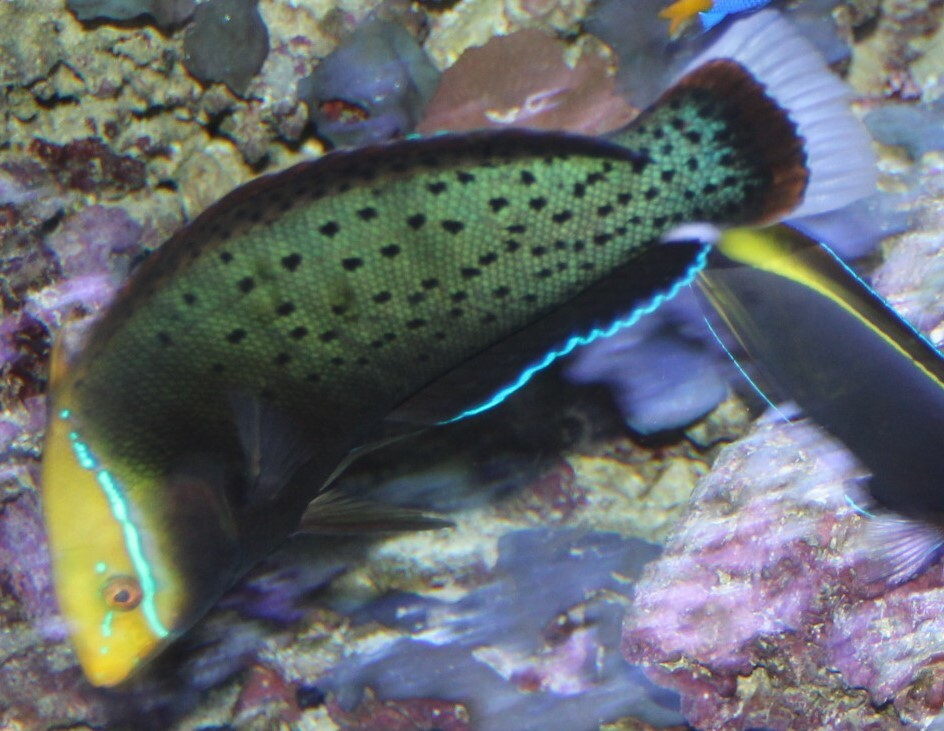
Female

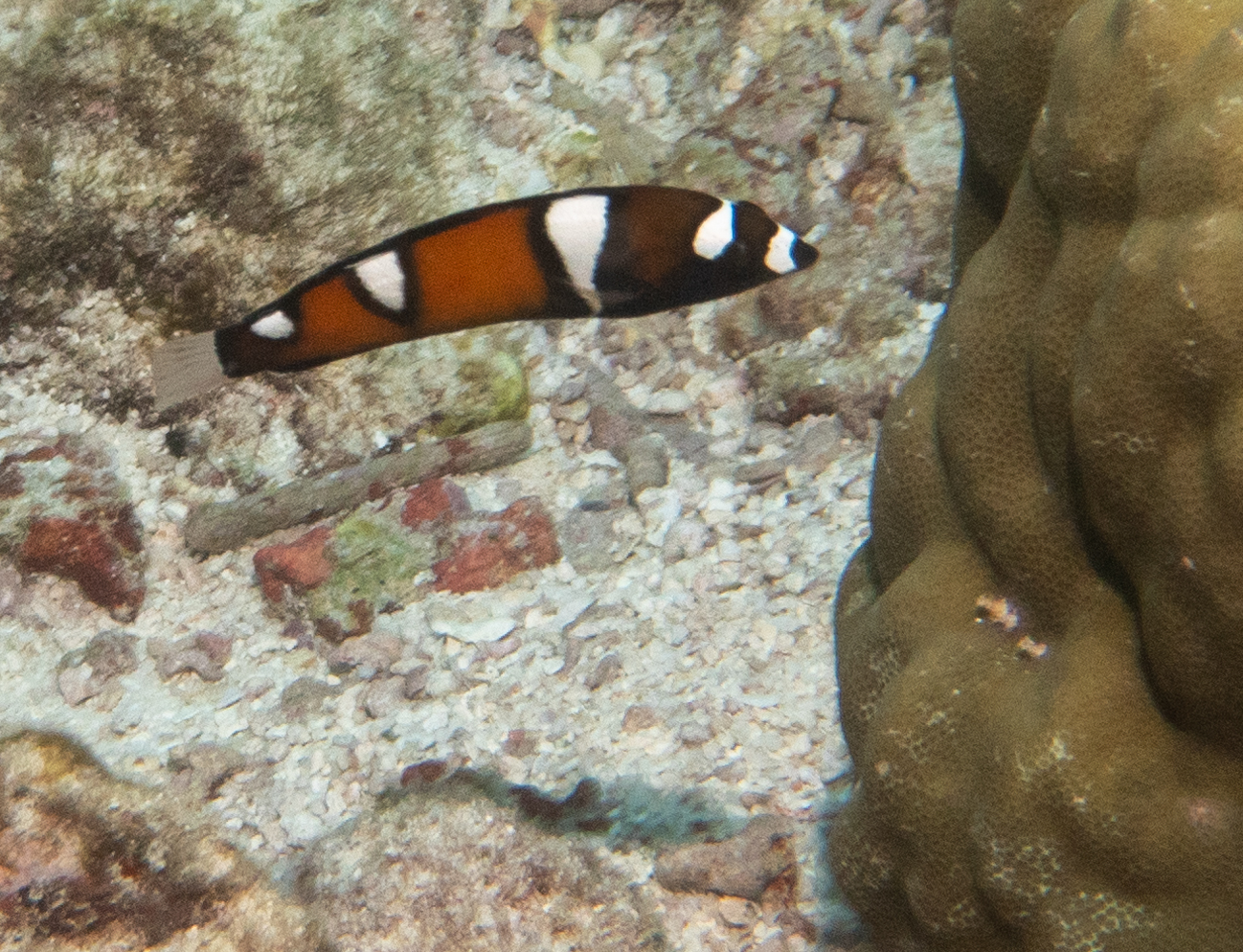
Juvenile
