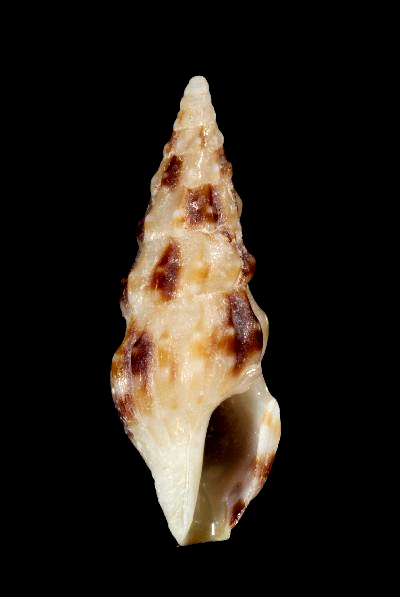
- Shell of Clavus formosus (specimen in the MNHN, Paris)

Scientific classification
- Kingdom: Animalia
- Phylum: Mollusca
- Class: Gastropoda
- Subclass: Caenogastropoda
- Order: Neogastropoda
- Superfamily: Conoidea
- Family: Drilliidae
- Genus: Clavus
- Species: C. formosus

Binomial name
- Clavus formosus (Reeve, 1846)

Synonyms
- Clavus formosa (Reeve, 1846); Pleurotoma formosa Reeve, 1846; Pleurotoma tessellata Reeve, L.A., 1846 (treated by Reeve as a secondary homonym of Clathurella tessellata Hinds, 1843; Pleurotoma formosa is a replacement name)

= Clavus formosus =

Species of gastropod

Clavus formosus is a species of sea snail, a marine gastropod mollusk in the family Drilliidae.

== Description ==
Its description is almost identical to Clavus laeta (Hinds, 1843)

== Distribution ==
This species occurs in the demersal zone of the Red Sea and the tropical Pacific Ocean off the Philippines. and off Papua New Guinea.
