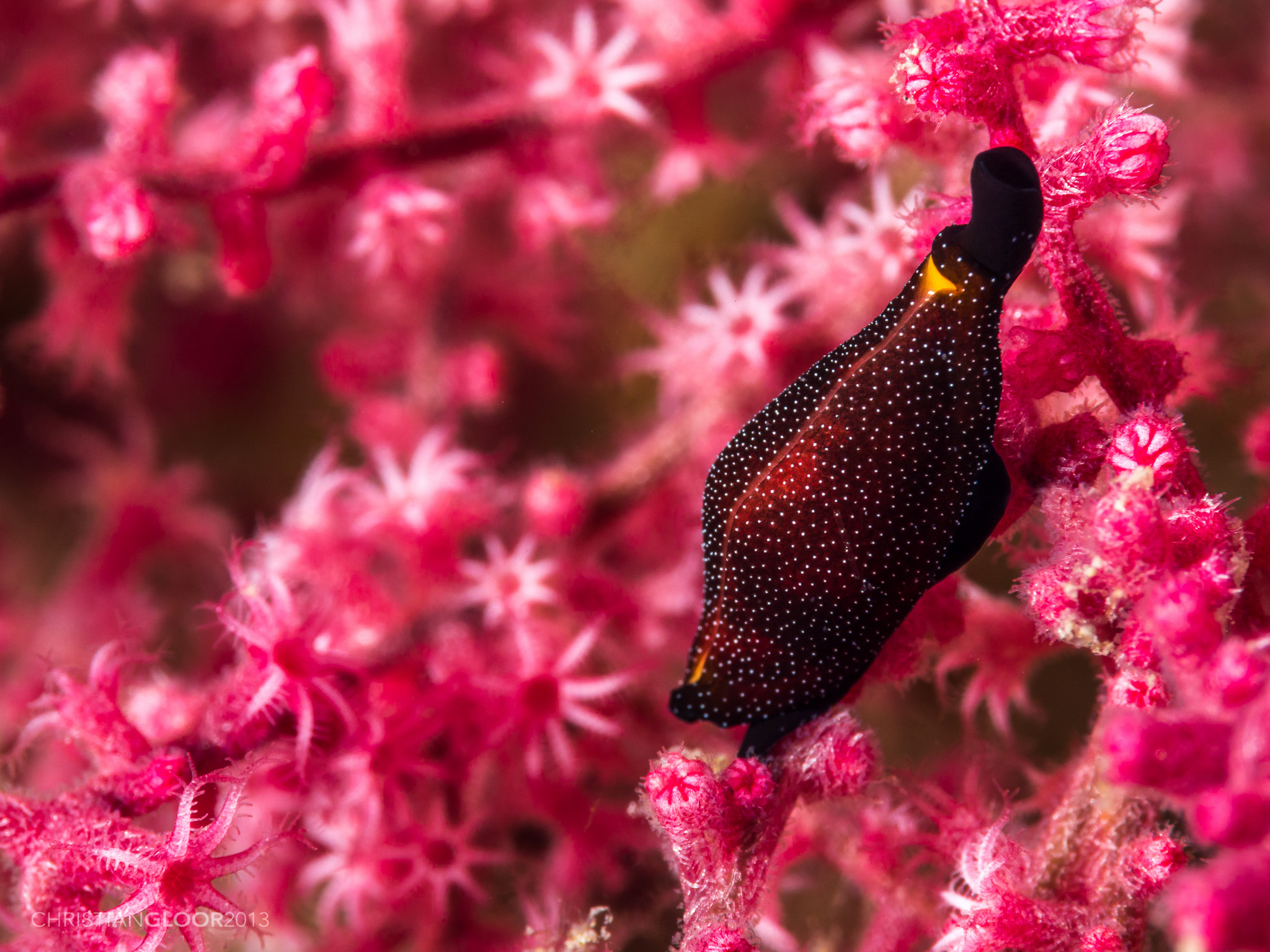

Scientific classification
- Kingdom: Animalia
- Phylum: Mollusca
- Class: Gastropoda
- Subclass: Caenogastropoda
- Order: Littorinimorpha
- Family: Ovulidae
- Genus: Primovula
- Species: P. formosa

Binomial name
- Primovula formosa (Sowerby II in A. Adams & Reeve, 1848)

Synonyms
- Cuspivolva formosa (G. B. Sowerby II, 1848); Delonovolva formosa (Sowerby II in A. Adams & Reeve, 1848); Ovulum formosum Sowerby II in A. Adams & Reeve, 1848

= Primovula formosa =

Species of gastropod

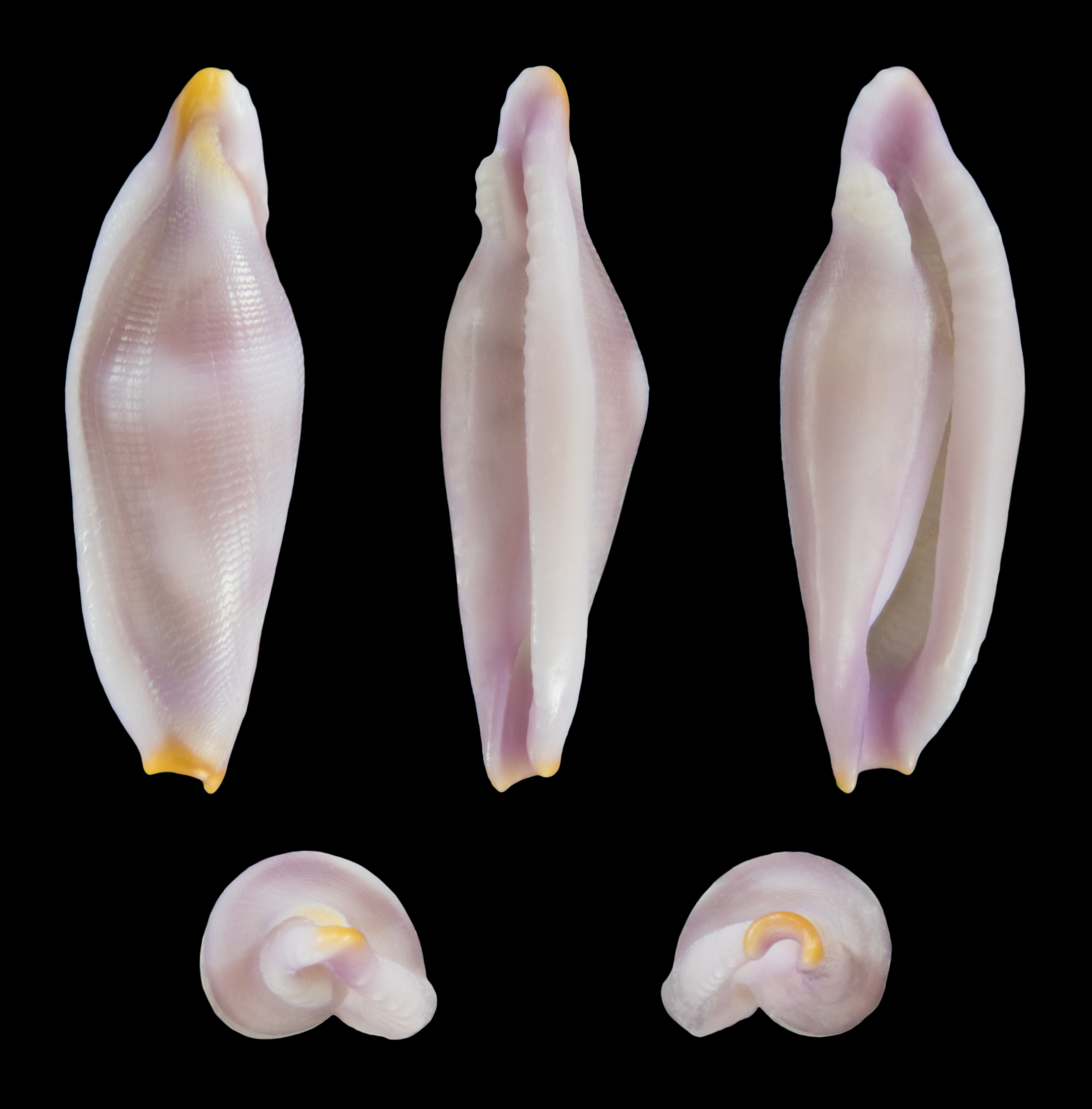

Primovula formosa is a species of sea snail in the family Ovulidae, the ovulids, cowry allies or false cowries.

== Distribution ==
This species is distributed in East Asia, spanning north from Japan, both sides of Taiwan Straits, Thailand and East Kalimantan. Usually habitat at bottom of sea, on species of order Gorgonacea at depth of 15-18m.
