= Zapogon evermanni =

Conservation status
- Least Concern (IUCN 3.1)

Scientific classification
- Kingdom: Animalia
- Phylum: Chordata
- Class: Actinopterygii
- Division: Teleostei
- Order: Gobiiformes
- Family: Apogonidae
- Genus: Zapogon
- Species: Z. evermanni

Binomial name
- Zapogon evermanni (D. S. Jordan & Snyder, 1904)

Synonyms
- Apogon evermanni D.S. Jordan & Snyder, 1904; Apogon anisolepis Böhlke & Randall, 1968

Species of fish

Zapogon evermanni, Evermann's cardinalfish, the cave cardinalfish or the oddscale cardinalfish, is a species of marine ray-finned fish belonging to the family Apogonidae, the cardinalfishes. This cardinalfish is found in the Indian and Pacific Oceans and the western Atlantic Ocean.

== Taxonomy ==
Zapogon evermanni was first formally described as Apogon conspersus in 1872 by the American ichthyologists David Starr Jordan and John Otterbein Snyder with its type locality given as Honolulu market, Oahu Island, Hawaiian Islands. In 1972 Thomas Henry Fraser described a new subgenus of Apogon he called Zapogon with A. evermanni designated as the type species. This genus is now treated as valid and is placed, along with 4 other genera, in the tribe Apogonini within the subfamily Apogoninae. The family Apogonidae is in the suborder Apogonoidei in the order Gobiiformes.

== Etymology ==
Zapogon evermanni is the type species of the genus Zapogon, this genus name prefixes the genus name Apogon with za- an intensive participle which means "alike" or "similar to", referring to theis taxon's similarity to Apogon. The specific name honours the American ichthyologist Barton Warren Evermann of the U.S. Bureau of Fisheries.

== Description ==
Zapogon evermanni as a fusiform body with a compressed cross section and it reaches a total length of 15 cm (5.9 in). There are 6 spines in the first dorsal fin, a single spine and 9 soft rays in the second dorsal fin while the anal fin has 2 spines and 8 soft rays. This is a yellowish to reddish or reddish-brown species with a wide dark bar on its headwhich runs through the eye, and there is a black spot on the body posterior to the dorsal fin, followed by a small white spot just behind it. There may be indistinct bars on the middle of the body.

== Distribution and habitat ==
Zapogon evermanni has a circumtropical distribution but it is absent from the eastern Atlantic Ocean. In the Western Atlanticit is found in the Caribbean Sea. in the Indian Ocean it occurs along the southeastern African coast from Kenya to KwaZulu-Natal, northern Madgascar, Mauritius, the Seychelles, the Madives, Chagos Islands, Christmas Island and the Cocos (Keeling) Islands. In the Pacific Ocean it is found from Java east to Hawaii and as far north as southern Japan. It can also be found in Western Australia between the North West Cape to Barrow Island. This cardinalfish is found at depths between 70 and 250 m (230 and 820 ft) along vertical calcareous walls.

== Behaviour ==
Zapogon evermanni is nocturnal and hides during the day in caves and crevices, swimming upside down on the roof, emeging to feed at night on zooplankton. Typically encountered as individuals or in pairs.
