= Ozichthys =

Conservation status
- Least Concern (IUCN 3.1)

Scientific classification
- Kingdom: Animalia
- Phylum: Chordata
- Class: Actinopterygii
- Order: Gobiiformes
- Family: Apogonidae
- Subfamily: Apogoninae
- Genus: Ozichthys; T. H. Fraser, 2014
- Species: O. albimaculosus

Binomial name
- Ozichthys albimaculosus (Kailola, 1976)

Synonyms
- Apogon albimaculosus Kailola, 1976; Foa albimaculosa (Kailola, 1976)

Genus of fishes

Ozichthys is a monotypic genus of cardinalfish, which was named and characterized in 2014. Its sole species, Ozichthys albimaculosus (also known as the cream-spotted cardinalfish), is found in tropical Australia and southern New Guinea.

== Taxonomy and description ==
Originally described as Apogon albimaculosus in 1976, Ozichthys albimaculosus is included in the clade containing Apogonichthys, Foa, Fowleria, and Neamia. Members of the family Apogonidae are of the suborder Percoidei. Apogonids characteristically have large heads and an ellipsoidal body. Ozichthys shares a number of other similar features with other members of the clade. These include aspects of head pigmentation and the colouration of fins along the body and vertical aspects are similar as well. Finally, each pored lateral-line scale demonstrates one pore oriented above the raised median canal and another below.

Features distinguishing the genus Ozichthys from other similarly colored apogonids include the number of spines on the first dorsal fin. There are sawtooth edges along the lower cheek bones. The bones supporting the first and second caudal fin rays are fused. In addition, principal caudal fin-rays show sixteen rows of free neuromasts. The posterior orbits have more than three flute canals. The first dorsal fin shows 8 visible spines. The ninth rib is epineural. The lateral-line scales contain 23–24 pores. There are 9 dorsal spines, 9 dorsal soft rays, 2 anal spines, and 2 anal soft rays.

== Distribution and habitat ==
These nocturnal fish, which exhibit external fertilisation of eggs, and mouthbrooding by males, are found distributed through Australia and Papua New Guinea. Typically, they are found in soft bottom, inshore locations and trawling sites. Pairing is distinct during courtship and spawning.

This tropical reef-associated fish typically resides in a depth range of 7–37 metres (20–120 ft) but can also be found as deep as 80 metres (260 ft). The maximum total length recorded was an unsexed male measuring 10.0 centimetres (3.9 in).
