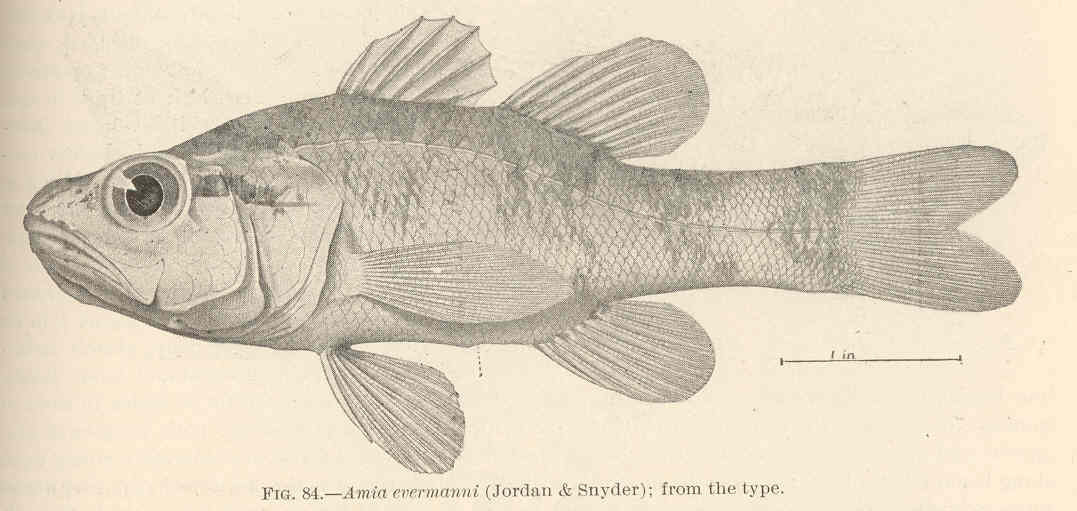
- Zapogon evermanni

Scientific classification
- Kingdom: Animalia
- Phylum: Chordata
- Class: Actinopterygii
- Order: Gobiiformes
- Family: Apogonidae
- Subfamily: Apogoninae
- Genus: Zapogon; T. H. Fraser, 1972

Type species
- Apogon evermanni D.S. Jordan & Snyder, 1904

= Zapogon =

Genus of fishes

Zapogon is a genus of fishes in the family Apogonidae, the cardinalfishes.

== Species ==
The recognized species in this genus are:

- Zapogon evermanni (D. S. Jordan & Snyder, 1904) (Evermann's cardinalfish)
- Zapogon isus (J. E. Randall & J. E. Böhlke, 1981)
