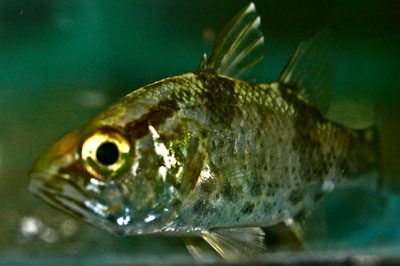

Conservation status
- Least Concern (IUCN 3.1)

Scientific classification
- Kingdom: Animalia
- Phylum: Chordata
- Class: Actinopterygii
- Division: Teleostei
- Order: Gobiiformes
- Family: Apogonidae
- Genus: Glossamia
- Species: G. aprion

Binomial name
- Glossamia aprion (J. Richardson, 1842)

Synonyms
- Apogon aprion J. Richardson, 1842; Apogonichthys gillii Steindachner, 1867; Mionorus lunatus Krefft, 1868; Gulliveria fasciata Castelnau, 1878; Gulliveria fusca Castelnau, 1878; Apogonichthys roseobrunneus MacLeay, 1881; Apogonichthys longicauda De Vis, 1884; Gulliveria ramsayi MacLeay, 1884; Kurandapogon blanchardi Whitley, 1939

= Glossamia aprion =

Species of fish

Glossamia aprion is a species of freshwater ray-finned fish from the family Apogonidae, the cardinalfishes, from northern Australia and New Guinea. In Australia, it is commonly known as the mouth almighty.

== Description ==
G. aprion has a creamy-brown background colour and six to eight irregularly shaped, broken markings which are similar to bars; these are darker olive-brown in colour and they reach the ventral side. They also have many irregular, darker brown spots and blotches, which vary in size, and a dark bar which runs from the eye to gills. The first dorsal fin is sooty in colour, with the outer half much darker than the inner part, as are the pelvic and the inner parts of second dorsal and anal fins. Also, dark spots and marbling are on these fins. This species grows to a maximum standard length of 18 cm (7.1 in), although standard lengths of 12 cm (4.7 in) are normal.

== Distribution ==
G. aprion is widespread in northern Australia, where its occurs in rivers, creeks, and lagoons from the Fitzroy River in the West Kimberley region of Western Australia to the Burnett River in Queensland. It is found in similar habitats in New Guinea.

== Habitat and ecology ==
G. aprion is native to still or slowly flowing fresh waters, where it shelters in aquatic vegetation growing in the shallows near the edges. It is a nocturnal species which ambushes its prey, mainly small crustaceans, insects, and smaller fish. The female lays a relatively small number of large eggs. These are brooded by the male in his mouth, and the larvae hatch at a quite advanced stage.
