= Xeniamia =

Scientific classification
- Kingdom: Animalia
- Phylum: Chordata
- Class: Actinopterygii
- Division: Teleostei
- Order: Gobiiformes
- Family: Apogonidae
- Subfamily: Apogoninae
- Genus: Xeniamia; Fraser & Prokofiev, 2016
- Species: X. atrithorax

Binomial name
- Xeniamia atrithorax Fraser & Prokofiev, 2016

Genus of fishes

Xeniamia is a monospecific genus of marine ray-finned fish belonging to the family Apogonidae, the cardinalfishes. The only species in the genus is Xeniamia atrithorax, the black-chest cardinalfish. This cardinalfish is found in the Western Pacific Ocean.

== Taxonomy ==
Xeniamia was formally described as a genus in 2016 by the America ichthyologist Thomas Henry Fraser and the Russian ichthyologist Artem Mikhailovich Prokofiev when the described its only species Xeniamia atrithorax with its type locality given as Vân Phong Bay at 12°40.944'-12°36.924'N, 109°29.752'-109°30.002'E, in the South China Sea off Khanh Hoa Province in Vietnam. Xeniamia, along with 5 other genera, is placed in the tribe Sphaeramiini within the subfamily Apogoninae. The family Apogonidae is in the suborder Apogonoidei in the order Gobiiformes.

== Etymology ==
Xeniamia combines xenos, meaning "stranger", with amia. The first part refres to the starnge colour and pattern of this taxon compared to related cardinal fishes. The second part, amia, is a non binomial name originally coined by Laurens Theodorus Gronovius for the genus Apogon which is now used as a common suffix for genus names within the cardinalfish family. The specific name, atrithorax, means "black chest", an allusion to the black spot in front of the bases of the pelvic fins.

== Description ==
Xeniamia has a body with a compressed crosssection and it reaches a maximum standard length of 3 cm (1.2 in). This species is a small cardinalfish which has 8 spines in the first dorsal fin and 2 sines and 9 soft rays in its second dorsal fin with the anal fin having 2 spines and 8 soft rays. There is a large black blotch in front of the pelvic fins, otherwise the overall colour is yellowish.

== Distribution and habitat ==
Xeniamia is found in the Western Pacific Ocean from Vietnam to Taiwan. It is normally collected in shrimp trawls from areas of mud substrate at depths of 70 to 119 m (230 to 390 ft).
