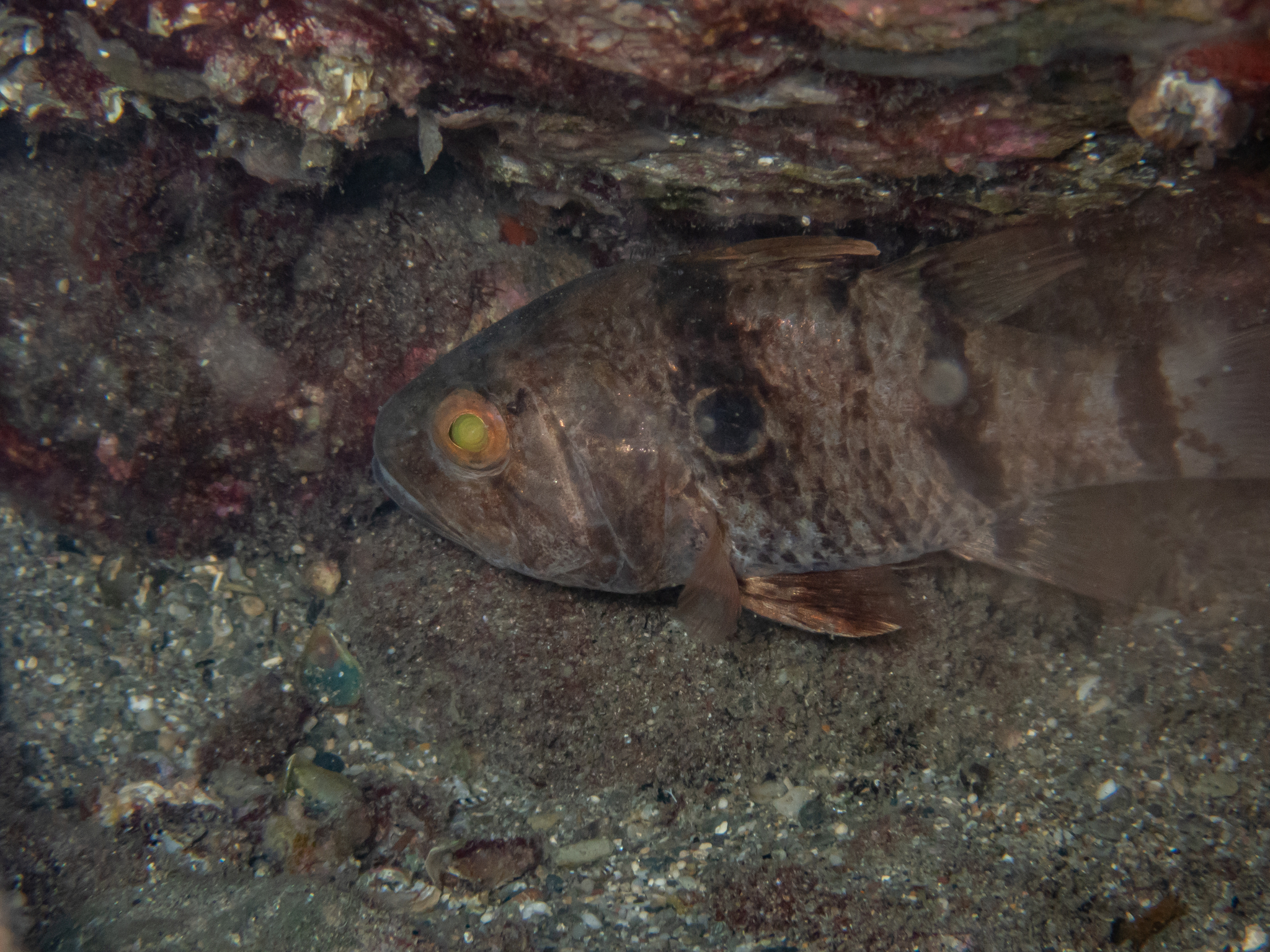

Conservation status
- Least Concern (IUCN 3.1)

Scientific classification
- Kingdom: Animalia
- Phylum: Chordata
- Class: Actinopterygii
- Order: Gobiiformes
- Family: Apogonidae
- Genus: Apogonichthyoides
- Species: A. pharaonis

Binomial name
- Apogonichthyoides pharaonis (Bellotti, 1874)

Synonyms
- Apogon pharaonis Bellotti, 1874

= Apogonichthyoides pharaonis =

Species of fish

Apogonichthyoides pharaonis, commonly known as the Pharaoh cardinalfish, is a species of cardinalfish from the family Apogonidae which is found the western Indian Ocean and Red Sea. It is one of a group of species which have colonised the eastern Mediterranean Sea from the Red Sea via the Suez Canal, a process known as Lessepsian migration.

== Description ==
Apogonichthyoides pharaonis has an oblong, compressed body up to 10 cm in length but more commonly 4–6 cm, with two distinct dorsal fins. The first two spines in the first dorsal fin are very short, the third spine is the longest and there is a single spine on the second dorsal fin and 8–9 soft rays. The anal fin lies directly beneath the second dorsal fin and has 2 spines and 7-8 soft rays and the caudal fin is truncated. The pelvic fin, which has1 spine and 5 soft rays starts beneath the base of the pectoral fins each of which has 15-16 soft rays. The large mouth is oblique and has jaws, palatine and vomer which bear villiform teeth. The eye is large and has a diameter which is greater than the distance between the eye and the snout. The preoperculum has a smooth ridge and saw-like margin. There is a spine which projects from the operculum in line with the central point of the eye. There are three vertical black bars which contrast with the grey-brown ground colour of the body, there is one bar running down from each dorsal fin and the last bar is on the caudal peduncle. There is a characteristic black 'eye-spot' surrounded by a yellow ring within the first bar. The first dorsal fin has a dark leading edge while that of the pelvic fins is white.

== Distribution ==
Apogonichthyoides pharaonis is native to the western Indian Ocean from the Red Sea and eastern African coasts to Australia. It was first recorded in the Mediterranean Sea in the 1940s off Palestine but it was misidentified as Apogon taeniatus. It has since been recorded in Rhodes (Greece), Cyprus and Turkey up to Libyan waters.

== Biology ==
Apogonichthyoides pharaonis is a nocturnal species which hides in caves and crevices or among beds of seagrass at depths of 1–50 m (3–164 ft) during the day. At night it emerges and feeds on zooplankton. Like other cardinalfish it is a mouth brooder, the males incubate the eggs in their mouths until the fry can swim free.

== Taxonomy ==
Apogonichthyoides pharaonis was first formally described as Agopogon pharaonis in 1874 by the Italian ichthyologist and paleontologist Cristoforo Bellotti with its type locality given as Suez. Apogonichthyoides pharaonis was previously considered to be a synonym of Apogonichthyoides nigripinnis but it is now regarded as a separate species with A. nigripinnis being found in the eastern Indian Ocean and western Pacific Ocean.
