= Phantom cardinalfish =

Scientific classification
- Kingdom: Animalia
- Phylum: Chordata
- Class: Actinopterygii
- Division: Teleostei
- Order: Gobiiformes
- Family: Apogonidae
- Genus: Lachneratus; T. H. Fraser & Struhsaker, 1991
- Species: L. phasmaticus

Binomial name
- Lachneratus phasmaticus T. H. Fraser & Strusaker, 1991

Species of fish

The phantom cardinalfish (Lachneratus phasmaticus) is a species of marine ray-finned fish belonging to the family Apogonidae, the cardinalfishes. This cardinalfish is found in the Indian and Pacific Oceans. It is the only member of the monospecific genus Lachneratus.

== Taxonomy ==
The phantom cardinalfish was first formally described in 1991 by Thomas Henry Fraser and Paul J. Struhsaker with its type locality given as the Kona coast at cave on north side of Ka'u Loa Point, 20–30 m (66–98 ft) back from the entrance, Hawaii Island, Hawaiian Islands. The holotype was described as "an unusual cardinalfish was taken in a trawl off of Hawaii" around 1969. Fraser and Struhsaker classified the new species in the monotypic genus Lachneratus. This genus is placed in the tribe Gymnapogonini, which contains three other genera, within the subfamily Apogoninae. The family Apogonidae is in the suborder Apogonoidei in the order Gobiiformes.

== Etymology ==
The phantom cardinalfish is the only species in the gemus Lachneratus, this name honors the American ichthyologist Ernest A. Lachner, who was curator emeritus at the United States National Museum in recognition of his contributions to the systematics of the Indo-Pacific cardinalfishes. The specific name, phasmaticus, is Neo-Latin and means "phantom-like", alluding to the elusive and phantom-like nature of this taxon. At the time is was known from just two single specimens collected in 1964 and 1974, and its identity eluded ichthyologists until addiional specimens were found in 1982 and 1983.

== Description ==
The phantom cardinalfish reaches a standard length of 7.4 cm (2.9 in). The first dorsal fin contains 6 spines, the second dorsal fin has a single spine and 12 or 13 soft rays and the anal fin has 2 spines and between 13 and 16 soft rays. This species has a transluscent red body with reddish fins and black intestines visible through the skin.

== Distribution and habitat ==
The phantom cardinalfish has been recorded from the Comoros in the Western Indian Ocean and from the Pacific Ocean from Vanuatu, Marquesas Islands and Hawaii. It has also been found at Osprey Reef off Queensland. although it is almost certainly overlooked elsewhere in the Indo-Pacific. This species is nocturnal, hiding in caves and crevices in the daylight hours.
