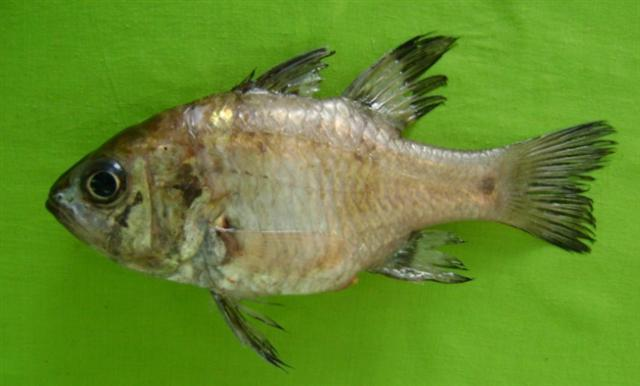
- Apogonichthyoides pseudotaeniatus

Scientific classification
- Kingdom: Animalia
- Phylum: Chordata
- Class: Actinopterygii
- Order: Gobiiformes
- Family: Apogonidae
- Subfamily: Apogoninae
- Genus: Apogonichthyoides; J. L. B. Smith, 1949

Type species
- Amia uninotata H. M. Smith & Radcliffe 1912

= Apogonichthyoides =

Genus of fishes

Apogonichthyoides is a genus of fish in the family Apogonidae, the cardinalfishes. They are native to the Indian Ocean and the western Pacific Ocean.

This genus was separated from Apogon in 2010. These species are light brown to brownish black in color, often with dark, elongated spots or stripes. Usually, they have a line on the cheek and two bars on the body. Some species have an eye-like spot on the side of the body.

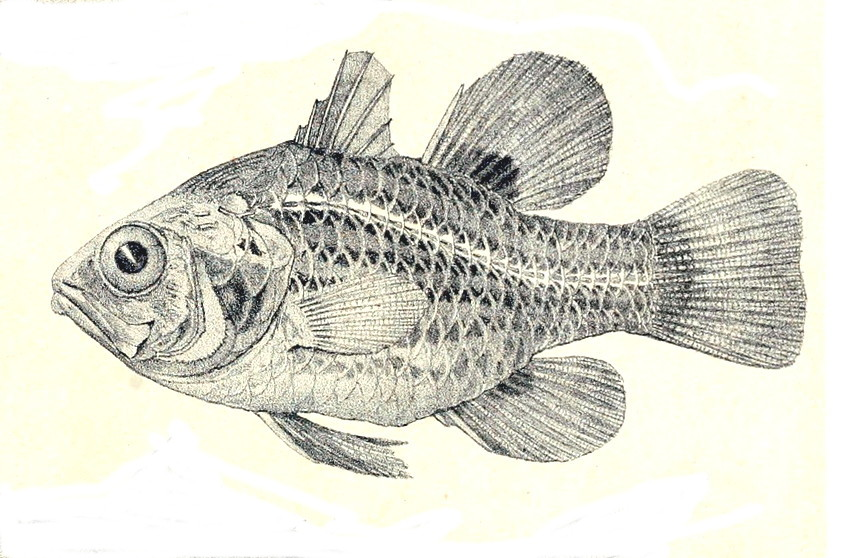
Apogonichthyoides brevicaudatus

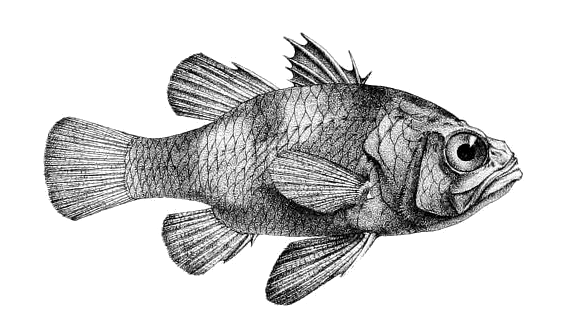
A. nigripinnis

== Species ==
The 24 recognized species in this genus are:

- Apogonichthyoides atripes (J. D. Ogilby, 1916) (bullseye cardinalfish)
- Apogonichthyoides brevicaudatus (M. C. W. Weber, 1909) (many-banded cardinalfish)
- Apogonichthyoides cantoris (Bleeker, 1851)
- Apogonichthyoides cathetogramma (S. Tanaka (I), 1917)
- Apogonichthyoides chrysurus (J. D. Ogilby, 1889) (golden cardinalfish)
- Apogonichthyoides enigmaticus J. L. B. Smith, 1961
- Apogonichthyoides erdmanni T. H. Fraser & G. R. Allen, 2011 (deep-reef cardinalfish)
- Apogonichthyoides euspilotus (T. H. Fraser, 2006)
- Apogonichthyoides gardineri (Regan, 1908)
- Apogonichthyoides heptastygma (G. Cuvier, 1828)
- Apogonichthyoides maculipinnis (Regan, 1908)
- Apogonichthyoides melas (Bleeker, 1848) (black cardinalfish)
- Apogonichthyoides miniatus T. H. Fraser, 2010
- Apogonichthyoides niger (Döderlein (de), 1883)
- Apogonichthyoides nigripinnis (G. Cuvier, 1828) (bullseye)
- Apogonichthyoides opercularis (W. J. Macleay, 1878) (pearly-cheek cardinalfish)
- Apogonichthyoides pharaonis (Bellotti, 1874)
- Apogonichthyoides pseudotaeniatus (Gon, 1986) (doublebar cardinalfish)
- Apogonichthyoides regani (Whitley, 1951)
- Apogonichthyoides sialis (D. S. Jordan & W. F. Thompson, 1914) (twinbar cardinalfish)
- Apogonichthyoides taeniatus (G. Cuvier, 1828) (twobelt cardinalfish)
- Apogonichthyoides timorensis (Bleeker, 1854) (Timor cardinalfish)
- Apogonichthyoides umbratilis T. H. Fraser & G. R. Allen, 2010 (cryptic cardinalfish)
- Apogonichthyoides uninotatus (H. M. Smith & Radcliffe, 1912) (onespot cardinalfish)
