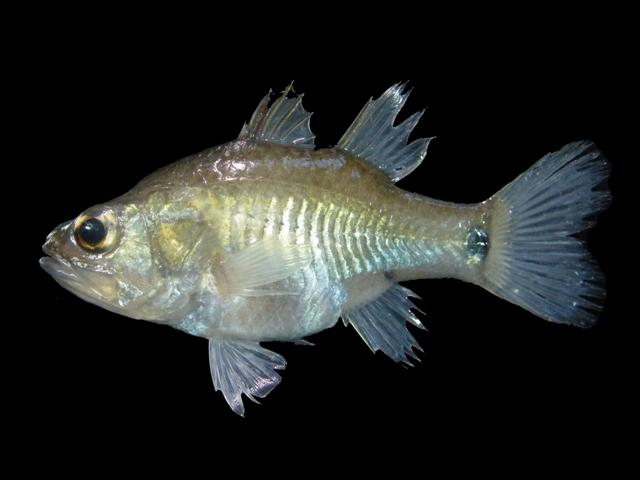
- Mangrove cardinalfish Yarica hyalosoma

Conservation status
- Least Concern (IUCN 3.1)

Scientific classification
- Kingdom: Animalia
- Phylum: Chordata
- Class: Actinopterygii
- Division: Teleostei
- Order: Gobiiformes
- Family: Apogonidae
- Genus: Yarica; Whitley, 1930
- Species: Y. hyalosoma

Binomial name
- Yarica hyalosoma Bleeker, 1852

Synonyms
- Apogon hyalosoma Bleeker, 1852; Ostorhinchus hyalosoma (Bleeker, 1852); Apogon torresiensis Castelnau, 1875; Yarica torresiensis (Castelnau, 1875); Apogon tickelli Day, 1888; Mionurus bombonensis Herre, 1925

= Yarica =

Genus of fishes

Yarica is a monospecific genus of marine ray-finned fish belonging to the family Apogonidae, the cardinalfishes. The only species in the genus is Yarica hyalosoma, the mangrove cardinalfish or hump-backed cardinalfish. This cardinalfish is found in the Eastern Indian Ocean and the Western Pacific Ocean.

== Taxonomy ==
Yarica was first described as a genus in 1930 by the Australian ichthyologist Gilbert Percy White with Apogon torresienses Castelnau, 1875 designated as its type species, as well as being its type species by monotypy. The status of A.torresiensis is uncertain, no type is known and some authorities treat as a synonym of Yarica hyalosoma. Yarica hyalosoma was described as Apogon hyalosoma in 1852 by Pieter Bleeker with its type locality given as Ambon; Jakarta, Semarang on Java; Bima, Sumbawa; Bengkulu, Padang, Priaman on Sumatra, Indonesia. The genus Yarica is placed, along with Glossamia, in the tribe Glossamiini within the subfamily Apogoninae. The family Apogonidae is in the suborder Apogonoidei in the order Gobiiformes.

== Etymology ==
Yarica is a name that Whitley did not explain, nor is its etymology evident. The specific name, hyalosoma, combines hýalos, an name given to any transparent substance, with sṓma, meaning "body", alluding to the waht Bleeker described as the “yellowish-hyaline” (translation) body in life.

== Description ==
Yarica has a short and deep body with a compressed cross section and it reaches a mazimum total length of 17 cm (6.7 in). This spevies has 7 spines and 9 soft rays in its dorsal fins and 2 spines and 8 soft rays in its anal fin. This species has an overall yellowish colour with a black spot on the caudal peduncle and a blck membrane on the first dorsal fin spines.

== Distribution and habitat ==
Yarica occurs in the Indo-West Pacific from the Yaeyama Islands, Japan, south to Indonesia, Australia and Papua New Guinea. It has also been recorded from New Caledonia, Palau and the Solomon Islands. Reports from the Western Indian Ocean need to be confirmed. The mangrove cardinalfish is found at depths between 1 and 25 m (3 ft 3 in and 82 ft 0 in), it is found in estuaries, mangroves, tidal creeks and the lower reaches of tidal rivers.
