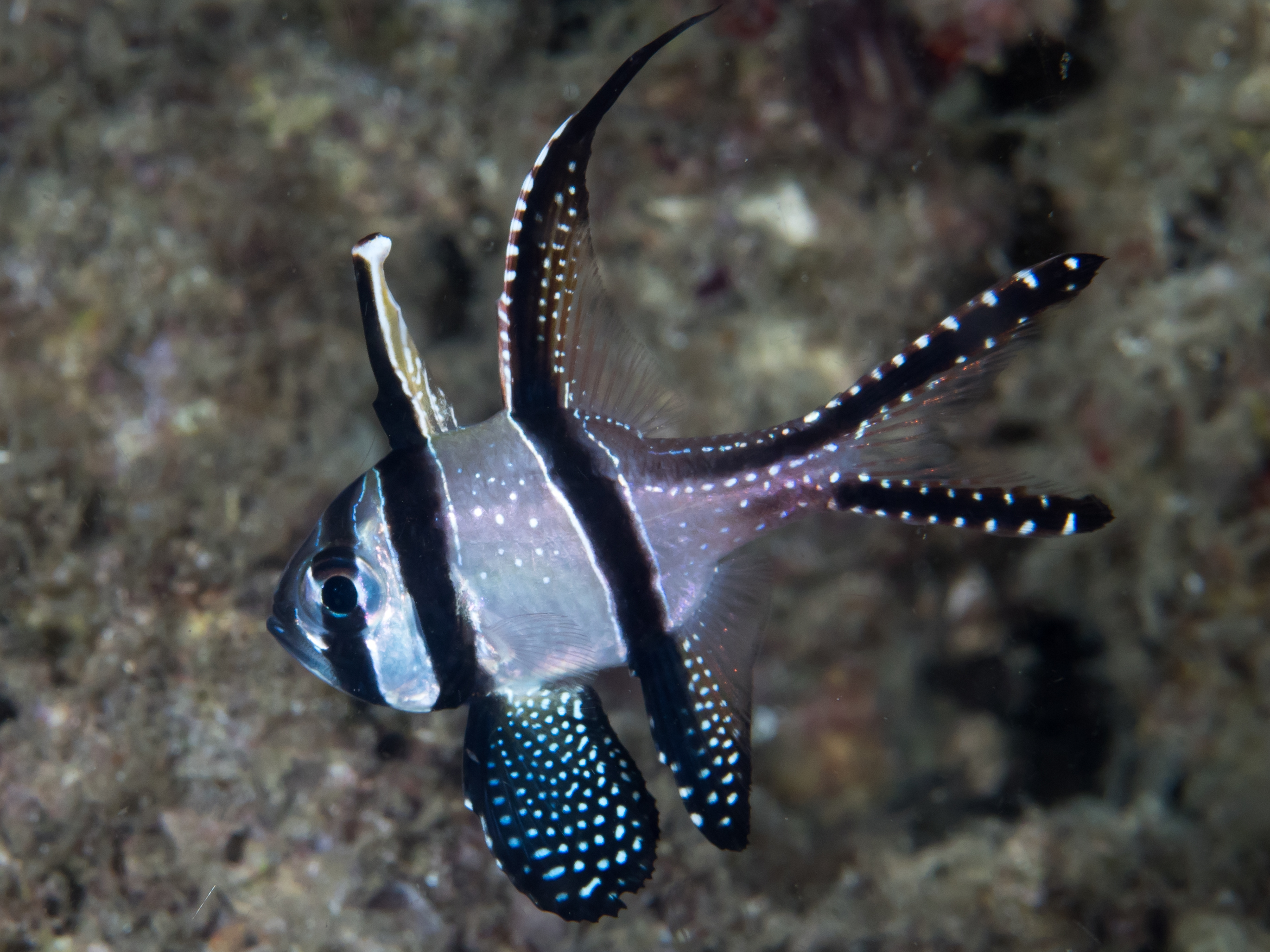

Conservation status
- Endangered (IUCN 3.1)

Scientific classification
- Kingdom: Animalia
- Phylum: Chordata
- Class: Actinopterygii
- Division: Teleostei
- Order: Gobiiformes
- Family: Apogonidae
- Subfamily: Apogoninae
- Genus: Pterapogon
- Species: P. kauderni

Binomial name
- Pterapogon kauderni Koumans, 1933

= Banggai cardinalfish =

Species of fish

The Banggai cardinalfish (Pterapogon kauderni) is a small tropical cardinalfish in the family Apogonidae. It is the only member of its genus, the sailfin cardinalfish which at first was included in Pterapogon now being separated in a distinct genus. This attractive fish is popular in the aquarium trade. It is among the relatively few marine fish to have been bred regularly in captivity, but significant numbers are still captured in the wild and it is now an endangered species. The detrimental impact of humans on its environment and certain fatal diseases threaten this species' numbers significantly. Iridovirus diseases are known to be a significant reason for fish mortality.

== Distribution ==
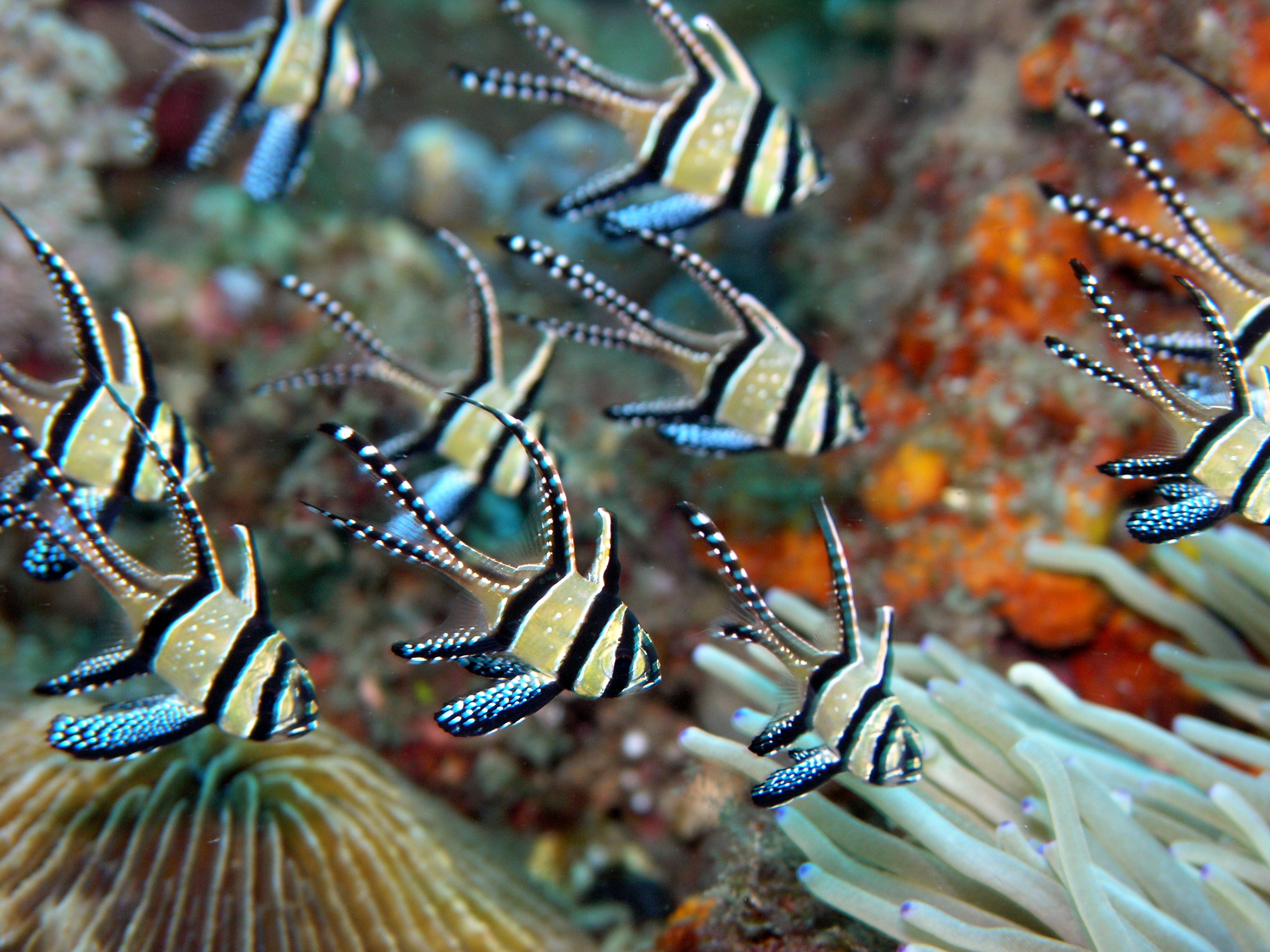
In the wild, Lembeh Straits, North Sulawesi, Indonesia.

This species is restricted to the Banggai Islands of Indonesia. This species has an extremely limited geographic range (5,500 km^{2}) and small total population size (estimated at 2.4 million). The Banggai cardinalfish is composed of isolated populations concentrated around the shallows of 17 large and 10 small islands within the Banggai Archipelago. A small population also occurs off Central Sulawesi, within Luwuk harbor. One additional population has become established in the Lembeh Strait (North Sulawesi), 400 km north of the natural area of the species distribution, following introduction by aquarium fish traders in 2000. Small populations seen (May 2014) in Secret Bay, northwest Bali (Banggai cardinal fish, Secret Bay, Bali).

== Description ==
This species grows up to 8 centimetres (3 in) total length. It is easily differentiated from all other cardinalfishes by its tasseled first dorsal fin, elongated anal and second dorsal fin rays, deeply forked caudal fin, and color pattern consisting of three black bars across the head and body and prominent black anterior edges on the anal and second dorsal fin. The male can be differentiated from the female by a conspicuous, enlarged oral cavity, which is apparent only when they are brooding.

== Ecology ==
The Banggai cardinalfish is the only member of its family that is diurnal. It is a demersal tropical marine fish that forms stable groups of about 9 individuals in shallow water, being most common at 1.5 to 2.5 m in depth. It inhabits a variety of shallow habitats, including coral reefs, seagrass beds, and open areas of sand and rubble. It is most common in calm habitats on the protected side of larger islands.

=== Symbiosis and mutualism ===
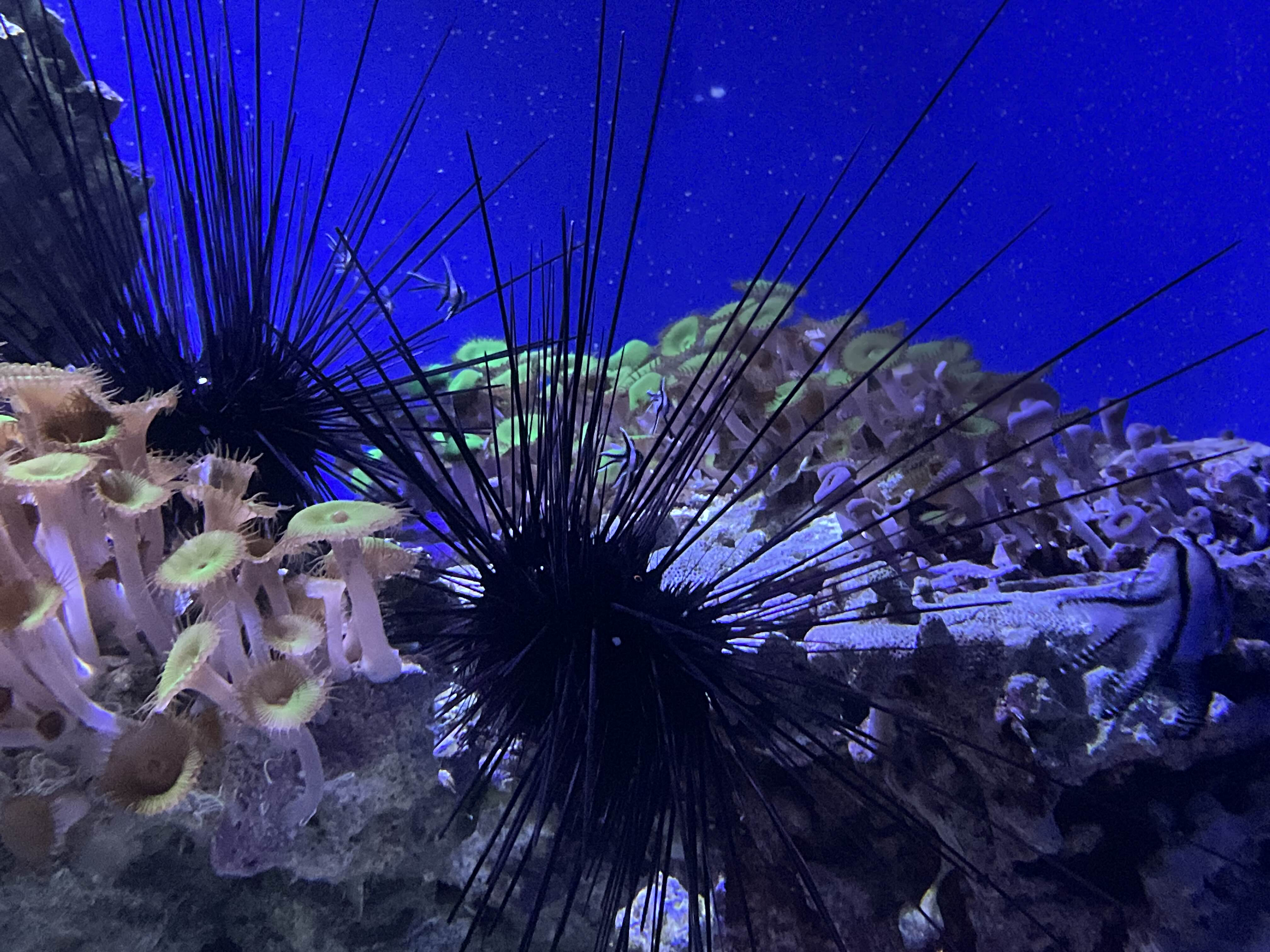
Long spined sea urchins hosting juvenile Banggai cardinalfish, at the Vancouver Aquarium.

It is often found associated with the seagrass Enhalus acoroides and the long spined sea urchin Diadema setosum. It occurs among various living benthic substrates such as sea urchins, sea anemones, and branching corals; young fish are most commonly associated with sea anemones, while juveniles and adults occur most frequently among long-spined sea urchins and branching corals, as well as sea stars, hydrozoans, and mangrove prop roots. Individuals of 2 to 60 hover above the urchins, with the younger ones about 2 to 3 centimeters SL staying closest to them. The fish retreat among the spines when threatened. Individual fish exhibit well-defined homing behaviour and return to the original location of their group when disturbed. The Banggai cardinalfish often coexists with various anemonefish and anemone shrimp when sheltering in anemones and corals; when found among sea urchin spines, it associates with several other genera of cardinalfish. Following removal of the fish by aquarium collectors, the abundance of associated invertebrates has been shown to decline.

Banggai cardinalfish live in shallow lagoons in groups that include up to 500 individuals. They are often found near sea urchins, where the fish hide when threatened. They are capable of hiding among the spines of sea urchins without being stung. In addition to sea urchins, other living benthic substrates such as soft corals, anemones, hydrozoans, and mangrove roots also serve as microhabitats around which the cardinalfish group. These groups of fish are rather sedentary, and movements between groups are observed to be very limited, especially because they feed on plankton that pass through water currents. Such limited dispersal of Banggai cardinalfish prevents them from spreading over large geographic ranges, thus serving as a major risk of extinction along with heavy exploitation by aquarium fish collectors, as well as low fecundity.

== Diet ==
This fish is an opportunistic feeder. Its diet includes planktonic, demersal, and benthic organisms. Copepods constitute the bulk of its diet. It serves as an important food source for several species of lionfish (Pterois spp.), the honeycomb grouper (Epinephelus merra), the crocodilefish (Cymbacephalus beauforti), the snowflake moray (Echidna nebulosa), the estuarine stonefish (Synanceia horrida), and the yellow-lipped sea krait (Laticauda colubrina).

== Reproduction ==
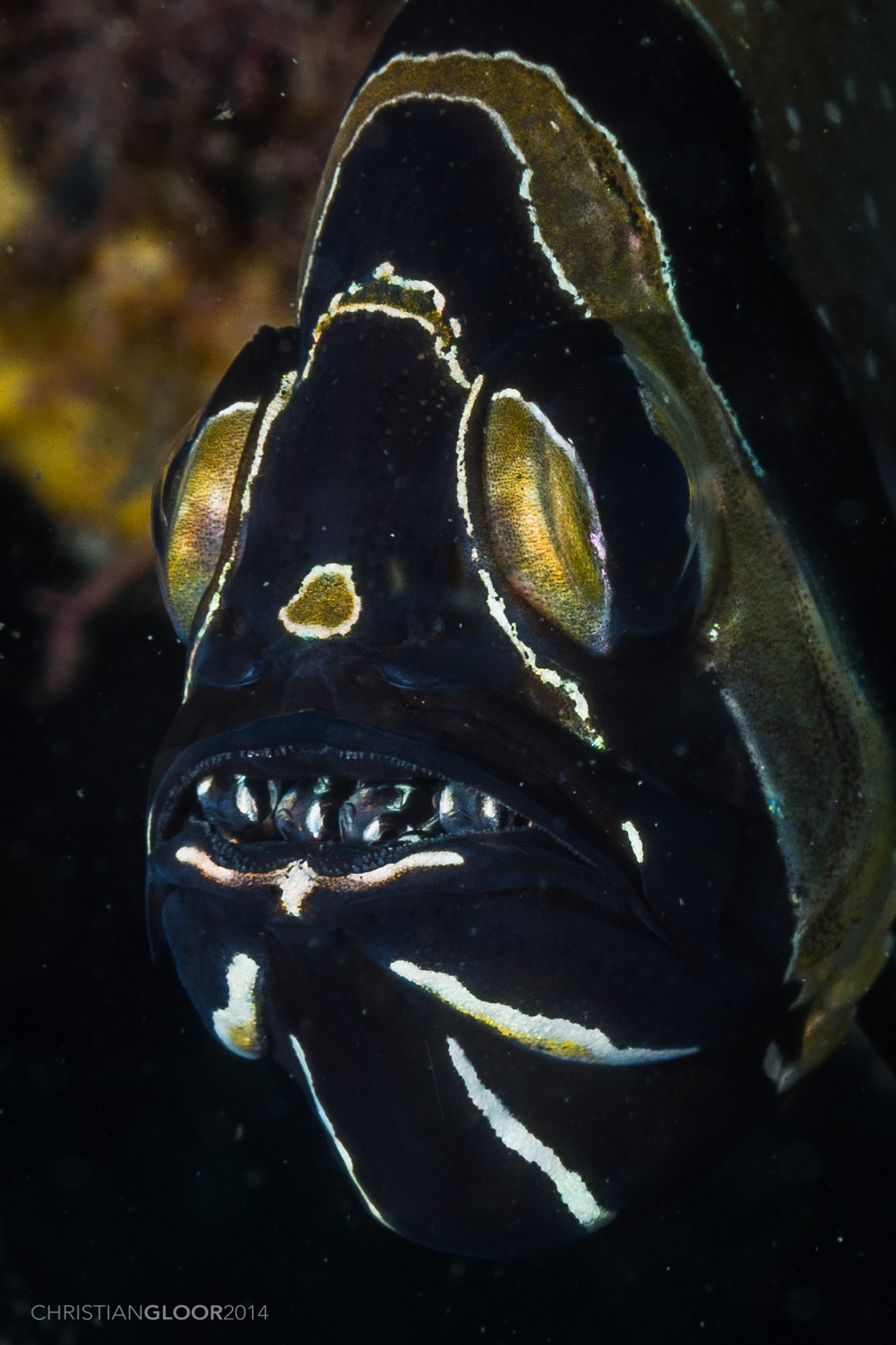
Male mouthbrooding. Wakatobi National Park, Indonesia.

The Banggai cardinalfish is a paternal mouthbrooder. The female plays an active role in courtship and pair formation, which occurs a few hours to a few days before spawning. Mating pairs establish spawning territories several meters away from the main group and vigorously defend them. The eggs are about 2.5 mm in diameter. The young remain in the male's mouth cavity for an undetermined period after hatching. Unlike many other species of marine fish, the Banggai cardinalfish lacks a planktonic stage in its life history. The species has a short lifespan, reaching around 4 years in optimal conditions in captivity, and perhaps 1 to 2 years in the wild.

=== Life cycle ===
Banggai cardinalfish are sexually monomorphic. The pairs form up to 2 weeks prior to spawning. The female courts the male from pair formation until spawning. The female's size determines the fecundity and egg size, but the male's size determines the reproductive output, or the number of the eggs that the pair produces. Therefore, pairing tends to occur among individuals of similar sizes, so the male is able to care for all the eggs that the female produces.

=== Courtship ===
In Banggai cardinalfish, courtship behavior is usually initiated by the female. Upon choosing a mate, the female isolates her potential mate from other individuals in the colony by creating a spherical spawning site that is about 50–60 cm in diameter. The general movement that the female exhibits is called 'side by side trembling', which is when the female approaches the male from behind with a vigorous trembling motion while the male stays motionless. Then she places herself alongside him and tilts her body thirty degrees outward from its vertical plane, when the male and female's caudal and anal fins come into contact. The female repeats this movement until the male responds with sporadic 'mouth opening,' a sign of receptiveness. Such courtship behavior may last from several hours to 2–33 days. When an intruder interrupts a female's courtship behavior, the female would rapidly and aggressively chase the intruder away if the intruder is of the same sex. However, when the secondary male, or the intruder male approaches, he, instead of the female, exhibits trembling behavior, and also helps to defend the female and primary male's isolated territory. If the primary male does not respond to female's trembling, the female leaves periodically to visit the secondary male and displays trembling behavior which often results in mating.

==== Selection of mates ====
Although the females initiate courtship, female and male cardinalfish are mutually selective. Females have been observed courting larger males more intensively. Even when they are already in the process of courting one male, they often moved on to an intruder male if it is larger than the original. Females have also been observed producing larger eggs for larger, hence more 'attractive,' males. Females are also able to increase egg size even after the onset of egg maturation if they encounter a new, larger male to brood its eggs. Male Banggai cardinalfish also exhibit preference by size, as larger females tend to lay larger eggs, and egg size positively affects traits such as offspring size, survival, growth, time until maturation, and swimming performance. However, it also takes into account information conveyed by females' courting movement. The 'side by side trembling' described in the previous section can be subcategorized into two different movements: 'rush' and 'twitch'. 'Rush' refers to the first part of the movement when the females approaches the male, folding her pelvic, dorsal, and anal fins together and quickly swimming past the male for a distance of 10–40 cm. Then she performs the 'twitch' by twitching or trembling her body close to the male. The intensity of the 'rush' behavior is important for the male in predicting the female's potential reproductive effort, as the intensity of the behavior correlates positively with clutch weight. However, the number of twitches performed per day strongly associates with how close to spawning the female is. By forming a pair with a female with more mature eggs, or closer to spawning, a male can increase his reproductive rate. Furthermore, he can match his readiness to spawn to females' by observing her 'twitch' behavior.

==== Spawning ====
When the male accepts female courting, the female expels eggs from her urogenital papilla. Female Banggai cardinalfish produce a relatively small clutch, consisting of no more than 90 eggs that are 2–3 mm in diameter. Once about three-fourths of the egg mass protrudes from the female, the male takes the eggs from her. This process is immediate, taking no more than 2 seconds. Eggs may be lost in the process if the male drops them, as they are usually immediately consumed by other fish in the area. Males also have the ability to detect dead eggs and expel them from their mouths. The male broods the eggs in his mouth up to 30 days, during which he does not feed. After spawning, the female stays with the brooding male for at least a few days. Females aggressively defend their territory by immediately chasing any intruders that approach the brooding males. They also exhibit a relaxed form of 'side-by-side trembling', and confine the males to a small space.

=== Juvenile behavior ===
Juvenile Banggai cardinalfish do not go through any pelagic larval phase. Instead, they experience a high growth rate. Although the free embryos maintain their size difference after hatching, they increase several times in weight while being brooded inside their father's mouth. Therefore, at release, juveniles are many times heavier than they were at hatching. Juveniles settle directly within the parents' habitat upon release from their father's mouth. They form a tight school around different structures such as sea urchins, corals, and sea anemones, and swim around together while the father does not exhibit much caring behavior.

== In captivity ==
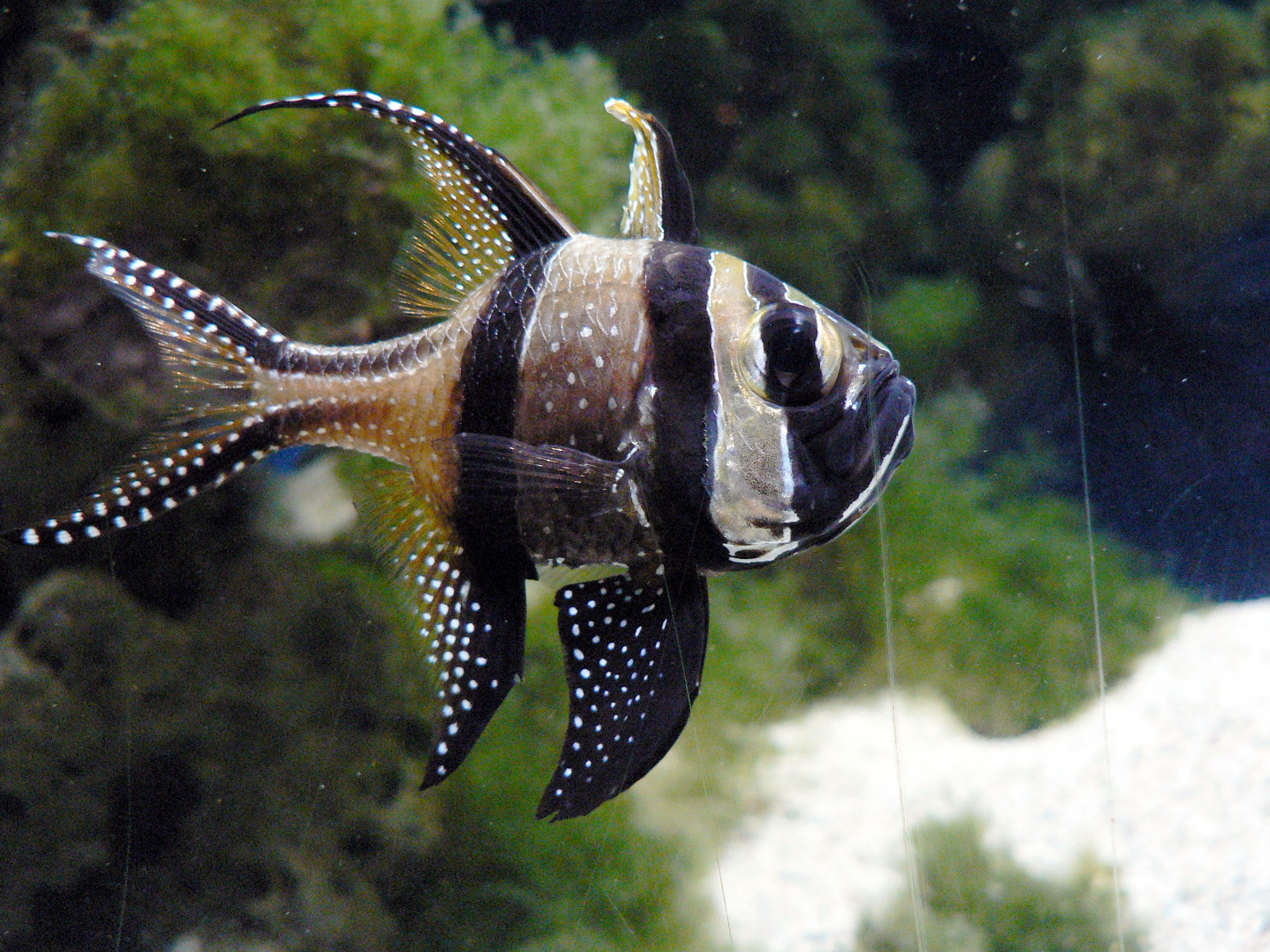
Banggai cardinalfish at the Budapest Zoo aquarium

The Banggai cardinalfish is a popular aquarium fish among fishkeepers.

The fish is collected by local fishers and sold into the aquarium trade. This species first appeared in the international trade around 1995 or 1996. By 2001, 600,000 to 700,000 fish were exported annually. Trade estimates for 2001 through 2004 are 700,000 to 900,000 fish per year with collection occurring throughout the archipelago. Surveys identified significant (>90%) declines in two populations that were fished from 2001 to 2004, including the extinction of a population off of Limbo Island.

This fish has been successfully bred in captivity. Captive breeding presents an alternative to wild-caught fish. Initially, the relatively high cost–benefit ratio of its production combined with the large number of less expensive wild-harvested fish prevented expansion of aquaculture efforts. In recent years, prices for captive bred or aquacultured specimens have plummeted as large numbers have entered the market. As of early 2018 aquacultured individuals are regularly available for as little as $14 U.S. per fish, and aquacultured specimens make up the vast majority of the market. In addition, a newly emerging threat in the form of a viral disease has been documented in wild-harvested individuals maintained in captivity.

Collection for the aquarium trade has threatened this species with extinction. This increases the demand for captive-bred specimens. It is listed as an endangered species by the IUCN based on its small range, the fragmentation of its distribution, and its continuing decline due to exploitation for the international aquarium trade. In 2007, the species was proposed to be listed for protection under CITES Appendix II, which could limit export of wild-caught individuals, but Indonesia would not support this, and the proposal was withdrawn.

== Gallery ==
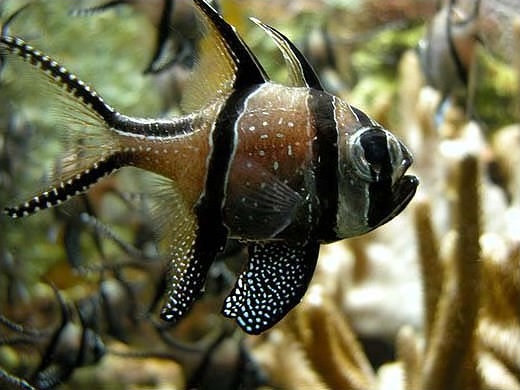
Banggai cardinalfish

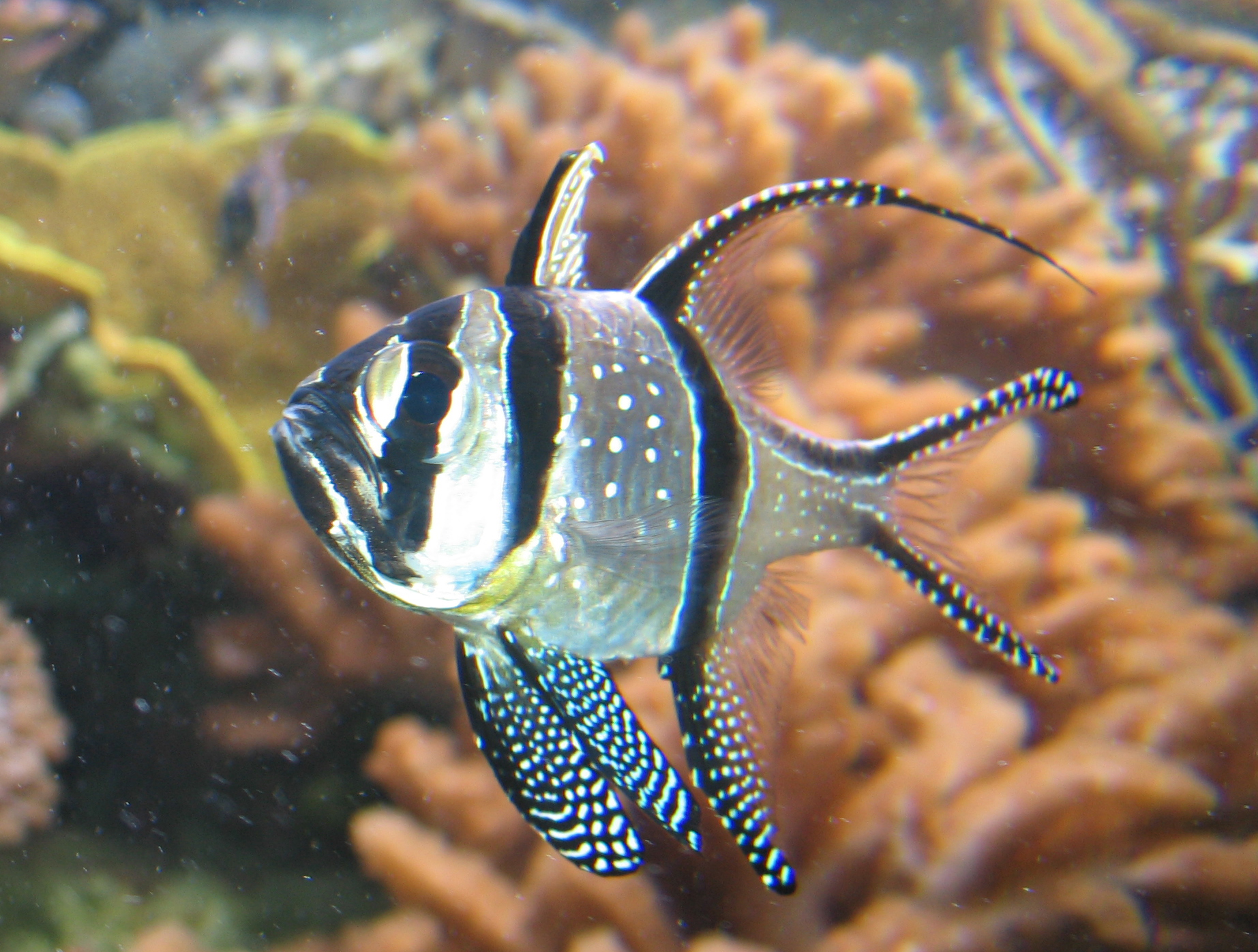
At the New England Aquarium

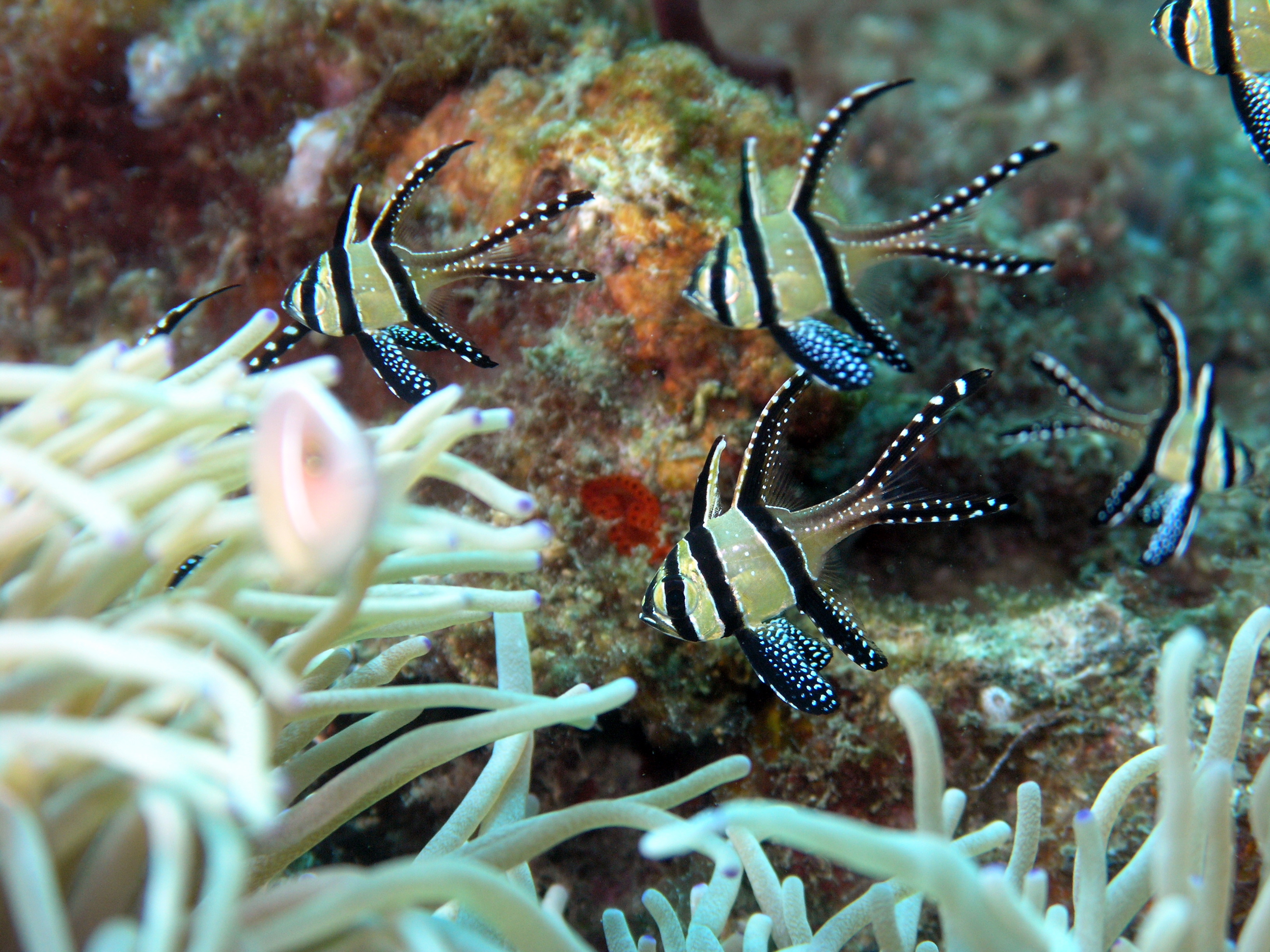
In the wild, Lembeh Straits

Swimming in a tank

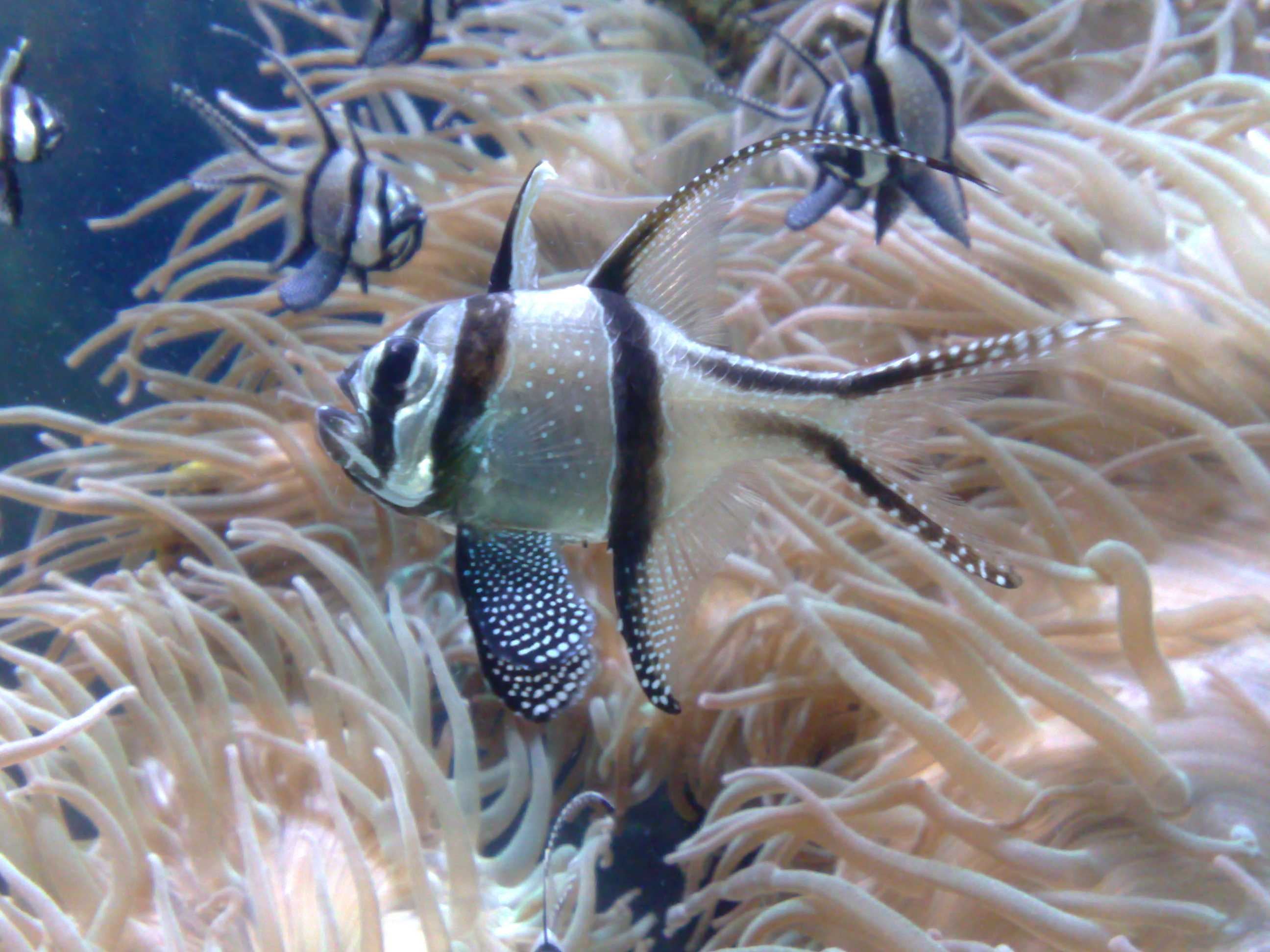
At Chester Zoo

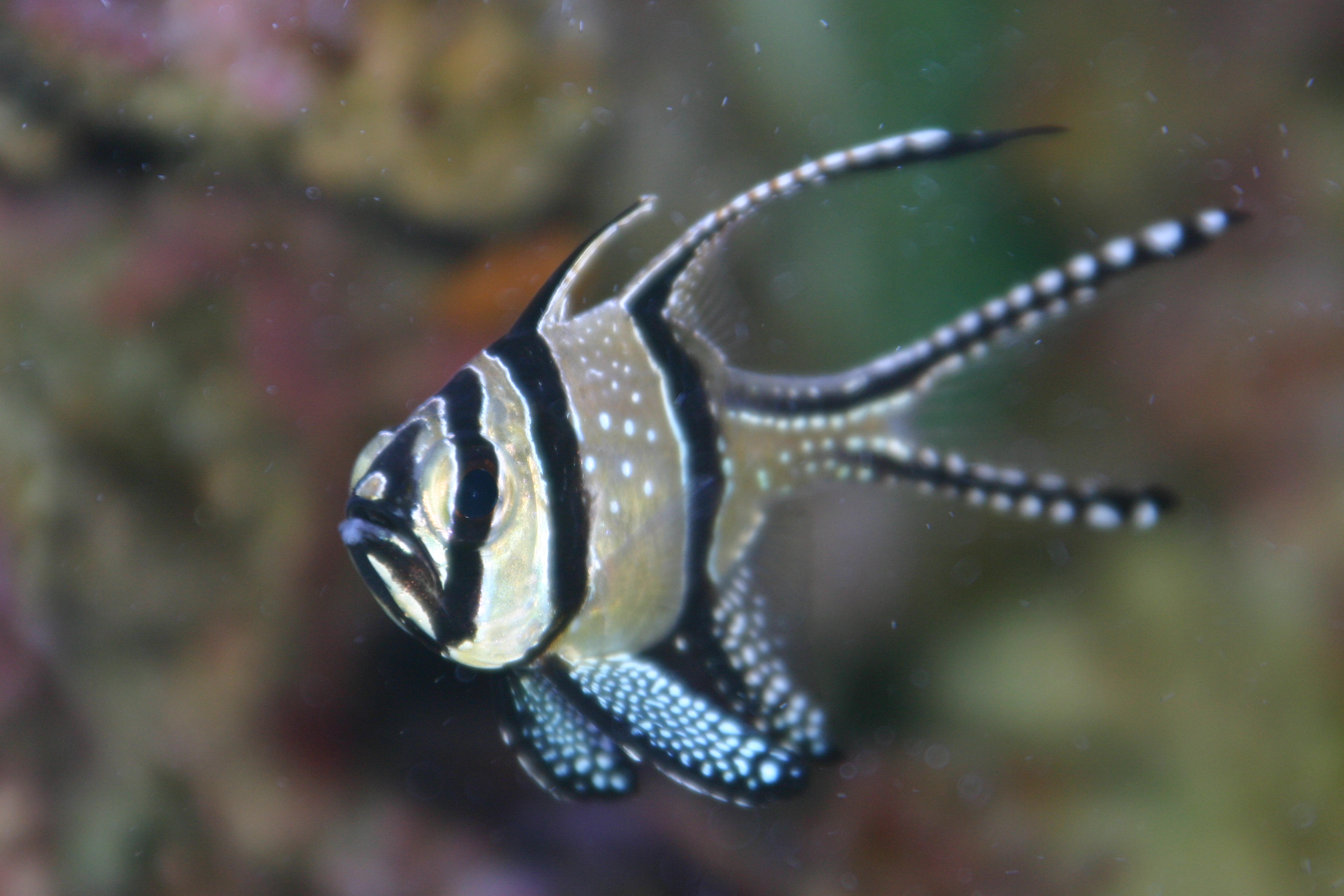
In the aquarium

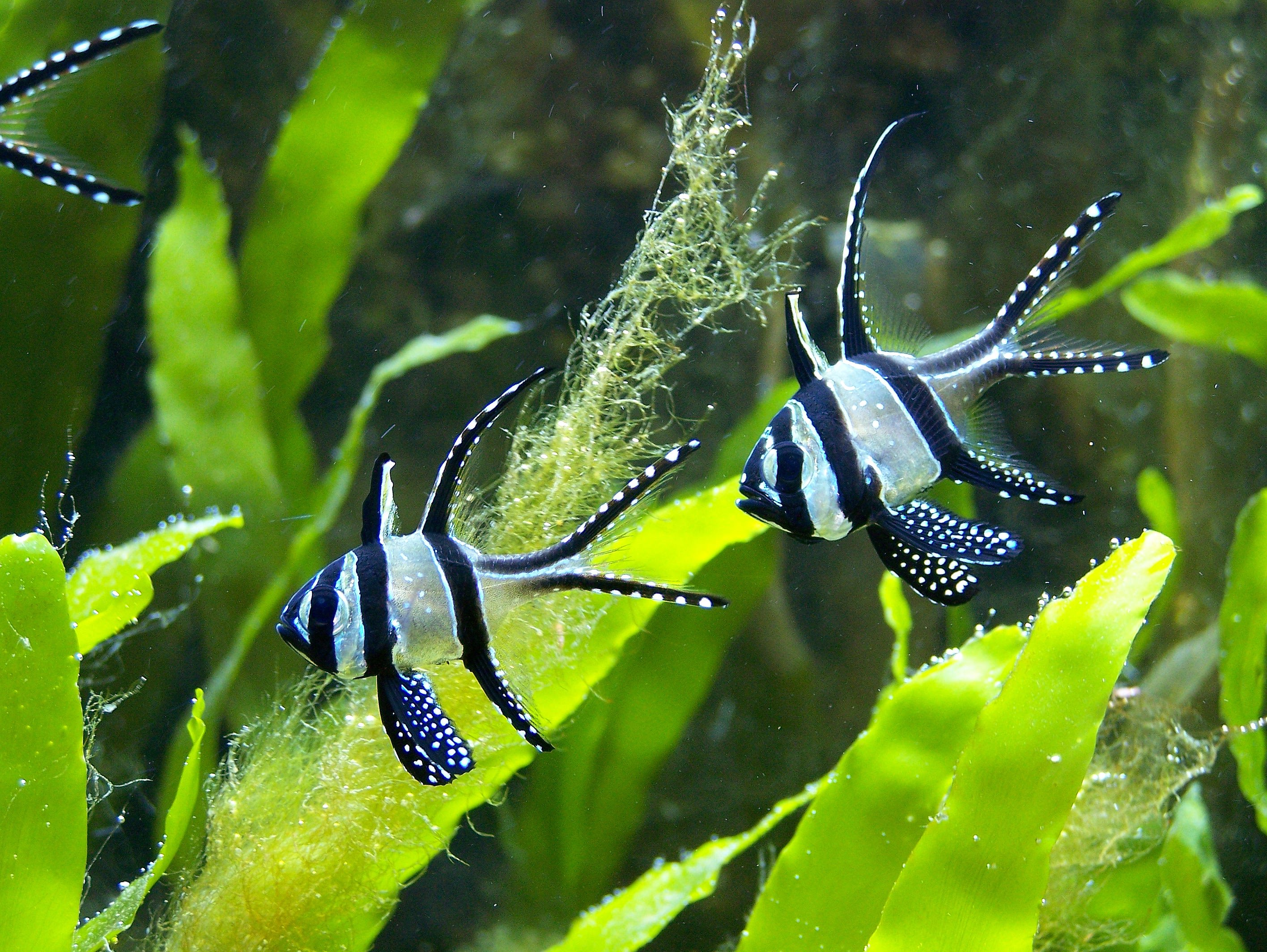
In the aquarium

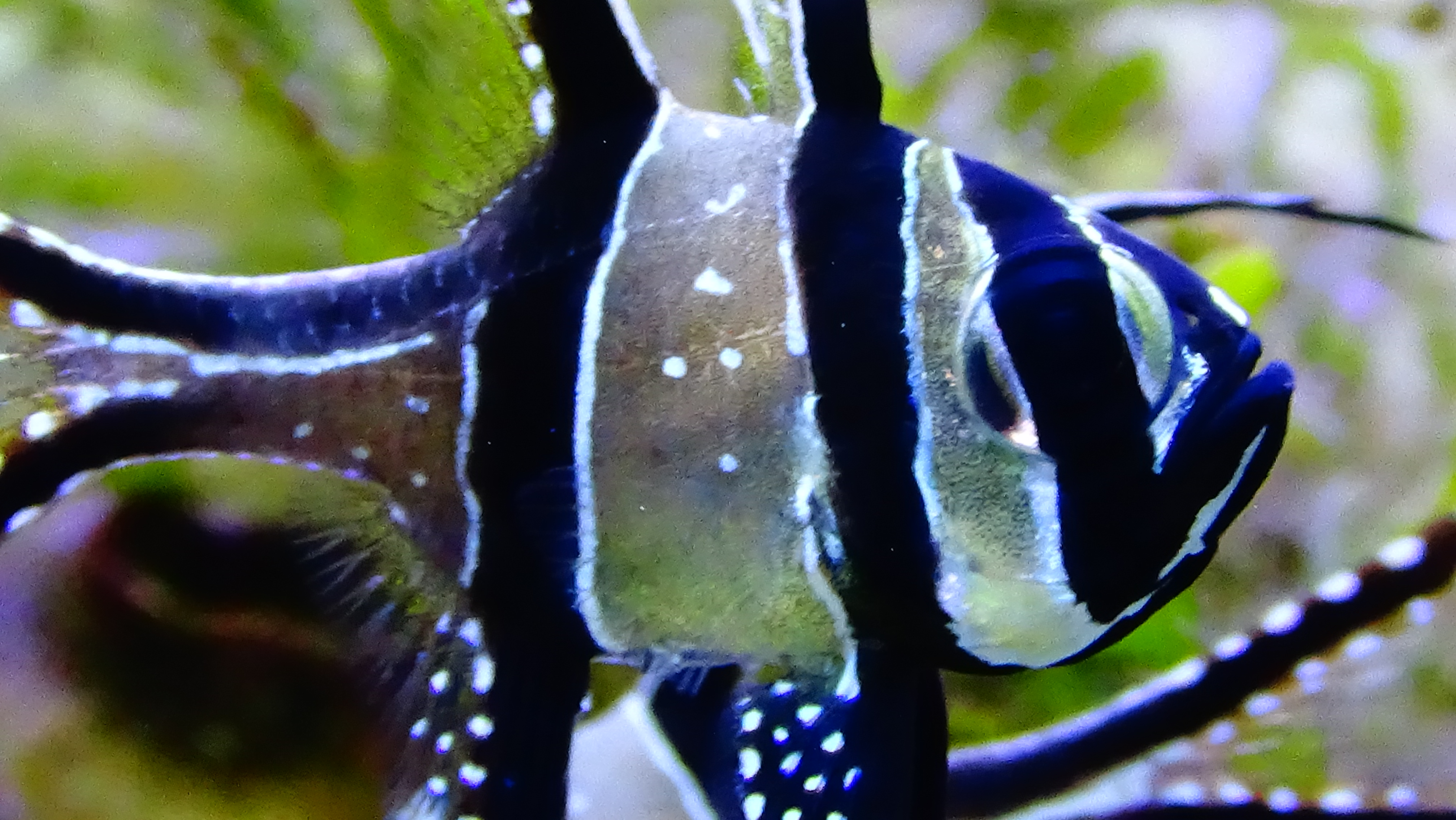
Close up body of Banggai cardinalfish in aquarium
