= Neamia =

Scientific classification
- Domain: Eukaryota
- Kingdom: Animalia
- Phylum: Chordata
- Class: Actinopterygii
- Order: Gobiiformes
- Family: Apogonidae
- Subfamily: Apogoninae
- Genus: Neamia; H. M. Smith & Radcliffe, 1912

Type species
- Neamia octospina Smith & Radcliffe, 1912

Genus of fishes

Neamia is a genus of cardinalfishes native to the Indian Ocean and the western Pacific Ocean.

== Species ==
The recognized species in this genus are:

- Neamia articycla T. H. Fraser & G. R. Allen, 2006 (circular cardinalfish)
- Neamia notula T. H. Fraser & G. R. Allen, 2001 (gillspot cardinalfish)
- Neamia octospina H. M. Smith & Radcliffe, 1912 (eight-spine cardinalfish)
- Neamia xenica T. H. Fraser, 2010
