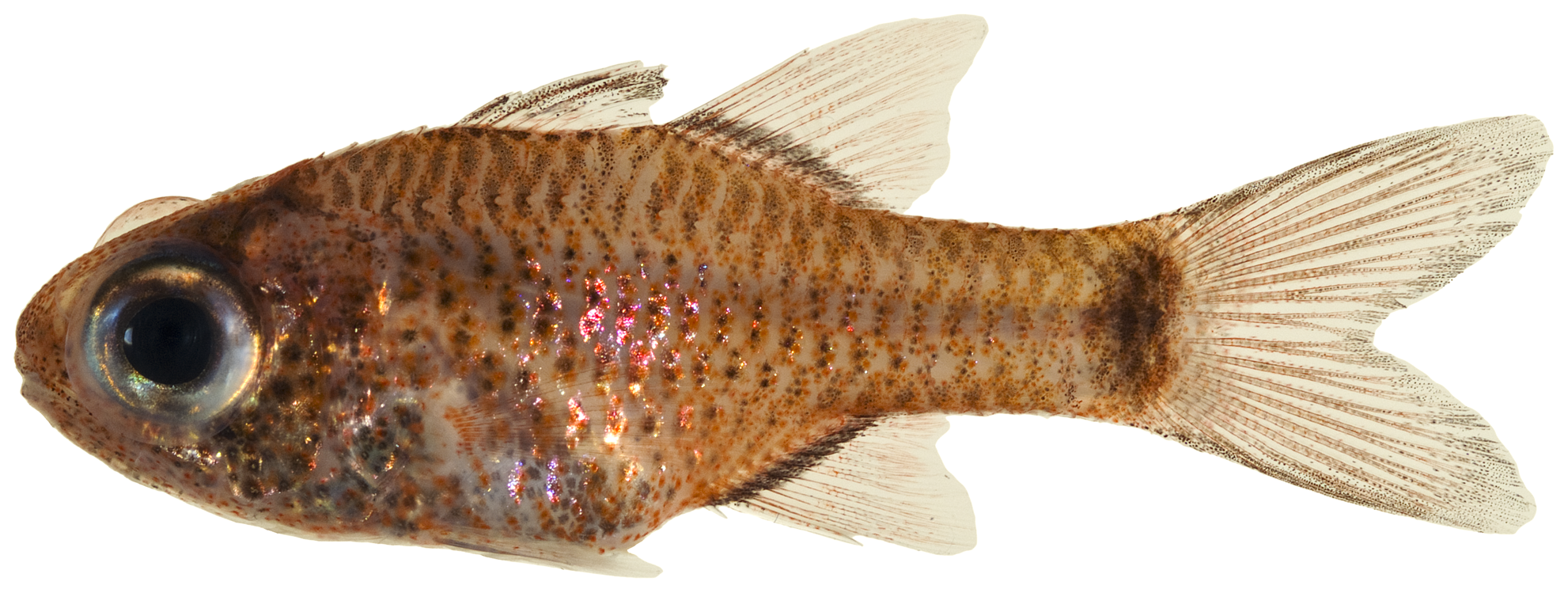
- Phaeoptyx conklini

Scientific classification
- Kingdom: Animalia
- Phylum: Chordata
- Class: Actinopterygii
- Order: Gobiiformes
- Family: Apogonidae
- Subfamily: Apogoninae
- Genus: Phaeoptyx; T. H. Fraser & C. R. Robins, 1970

Type species
- Amia conklini Silvester, 1915

= Phaeoptyx =

Genus of fishes

Phaeoptyx is a genus of cardinalfishes native to the western Atlantic Ocean.

== Species ==
The recognized species in this genus are:

- Phaeoptyx conklini (Silvester, 1915) (freckled cardinalfish)
- Phaeoptyx pigmentaria (Poey, 1860) (dusky cardinalfish)
- Phaeoptyx xenus (J. E. Böhlke & J. E. Randall, 1968) (sponge cardinalfish)
