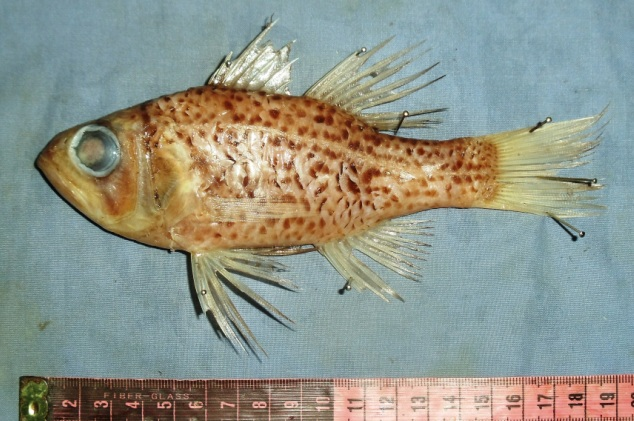

Scientific classification
- Kingdom: Animalia
- Phylum: Chordata
- Class: Actinopterygii
- Division: Teleostei
- Order: Gobiiformes
- Family: Apogonidae
- Subfamily: Amioidinae
- Genus: Holapogon; T. H. Fraser, 1973
- Species: H. maximus

Binomial name
- Holapogon maximus (Boulenger, 1888)

Synonyms
- Apogon maximus Boulenger, 1888

= Titan cardinalfish =

Genus of fishes

The titan cardinalfish (Holapogon maximus), is a species of ray-finned fish belonging to the family Apogonidae, the cardinalfishes. This species is the only known member of the genus Holapogon. This cardinalfish is found in the Indian Ocean.

== Taxonomy ==
The titan cardinalfish was first formally described as Apogon maximus in 1888 by the Belgian-born British herpetologist and ichthyologist George Albert Boulenger with its type locality given as Muscat, Oman, Gulf of Oman, Arabian Sea in the northwestern Indian Ocean. In 1973 Thomas H. Fraser redecribed this species and proposed the new genus Holapogon as a monospecific genus with the titan cardinalfish as its only species, as well as being designated as its type species. This taxon is one of two genera in the subfamily Amioidinae in the family Apogonidae in the suborder Apogonoidei in the order Gobiiformes.

== Etymology ==
The titan cardinalfish is the only species in the monospecific genus Holapogon, this name prefixes the genus name Apogon with hólos, which menas "whole" or "entire", an allusion to this taxon most closely resembling the ancestor of the genus Apogon, both this taxon and Amioides, the other genus in the subfamily Amioidinae, are thought to be basal to the rest of Apogonidae. The specific name, maximus, is Latin and means "greatest" or "largest", assumed to be a reference to this being the largest species thought to be in Apogon.

== Description ==
The titan cardinalfish reaches a total length of 25 cm (9.8 in) and it has a fusiform body. There are 8 spines in the first dorsal fin and 1 spine and 9 soft rays in the second dorsal fin. The anal fin is supported by 2 spines and 7 soft rays. This species has a unique colour and pattern with spots all over the body and two forward slanting bars on te gill cover and head. The finas are large and rounded.

== Distrobution and habitat ==
The titan cardinalfish is found in the Indian Ocean from Somalia and Oman east to Pakistan and southwestern India and the; Andaman Islands. This species lives at depths of from 38 to 100 m (125 to 328 ft).
