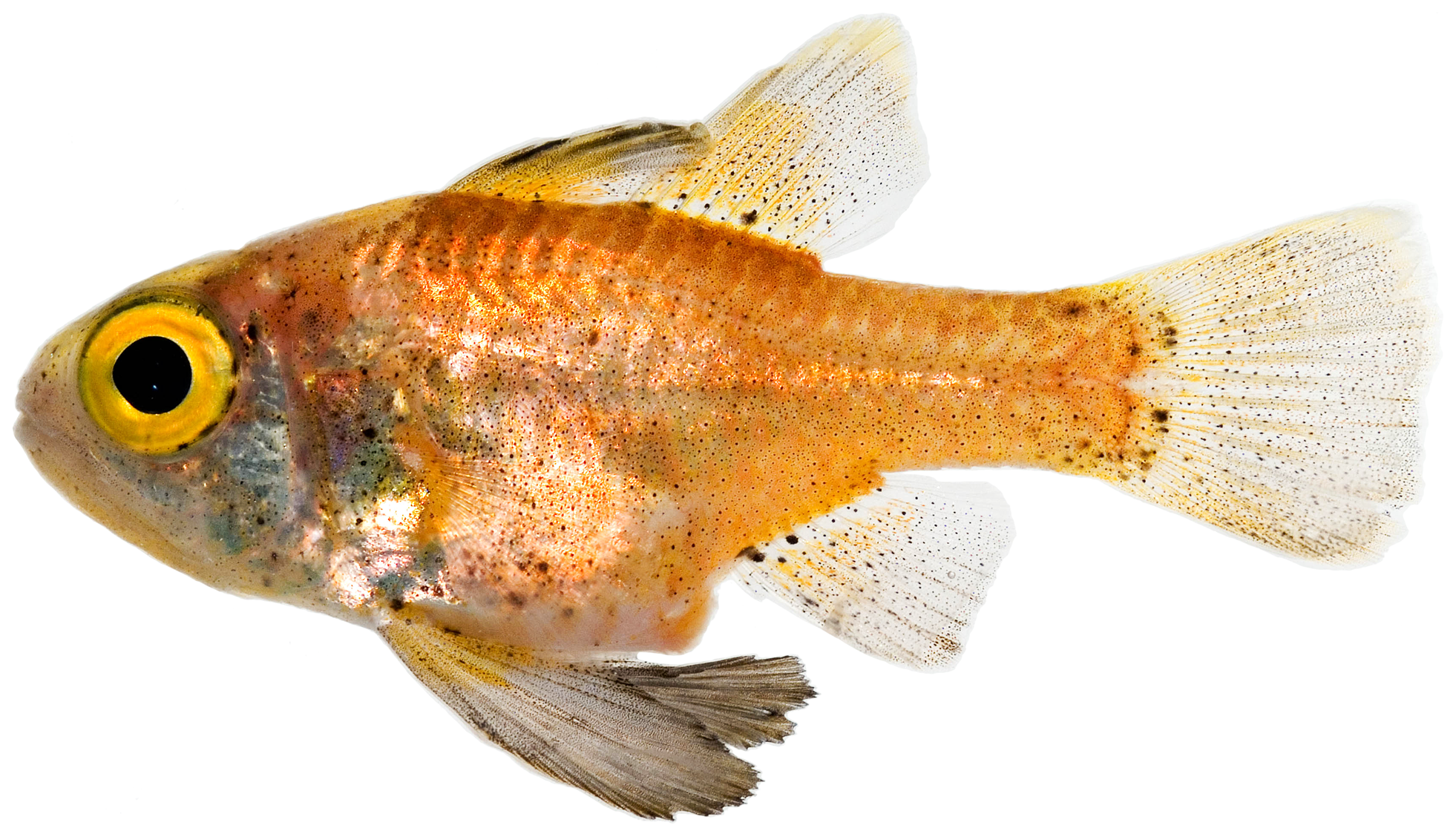
- Astrapogon puncticulatus
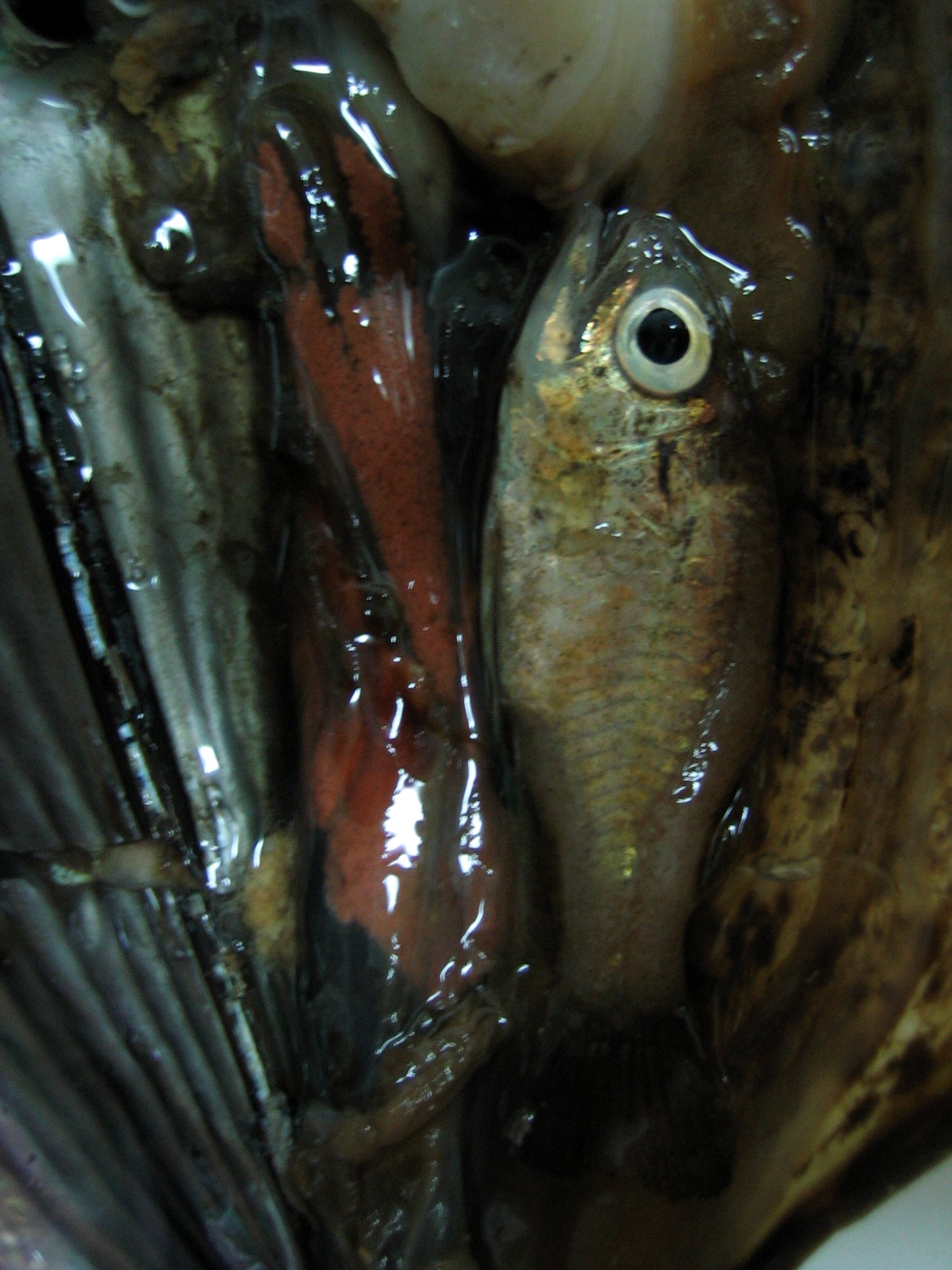
- Astrapogon stellatus inside a penshell from Jaragua National Park, Dominican Republic

Scientific classification
- Kingdom: Animalia
- Phylum: Chordata
- Class: Actinopterygii
- Order: Gobiiformes
- Family: Apogonidae
- Subfamily: Apogoninae
- Genus: Astrapogon; Fowler, 1907

Type species
- Apogonichthys stellatus Cope, 1867

= Astrapogon =

Genus of fishes

Astrapogon is a genus of cardinalfishes native to the western Atlantic Ocean.

== Species ==
The recognized species in this genus are:

- Astrapogon alutus (D. S. Jordan & C. H. Gilbert, 1882) (bronze cardinalfish)
- Astrapogon puncticulatus (Poey, 1867) (blackfin cardinalfish)
- Astrapogon stellatus (Cope, 1867) (conchfish)
