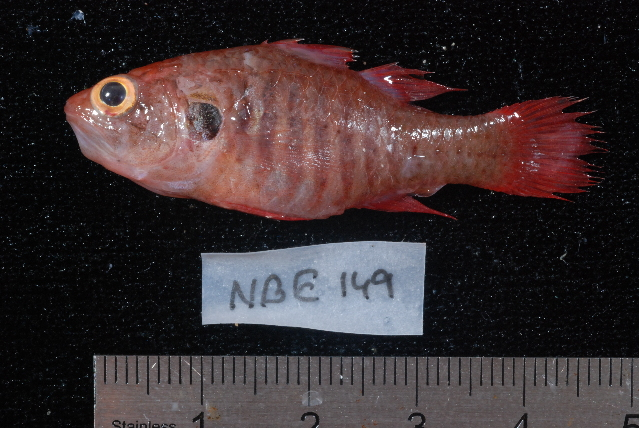
- Fowleria marmorata

Scientific classification
- Kingdom: Animalia
- Phylum: Chordata
- Class: Actinopterygii
- Order: Gobiiformes
- Family: Apogonidae
- Subfamily: Apogoninae
- Genus: Fowleria; D. S. Jordan & Evermann, 1903

Type species
- Apogon auritus Valenciennes, 1831

= Fowleria =

Genus of fishes

Fowleria is a genus of fishes in the family Apogonidae native to the Indian and Pacific Oceans. The name of this genus honors the American ichthyologist Henry Weed Fowler (1878–1965) of the Academy of Natural Sciences of Philadelphia, who attended Stanford University, where he was a student of David Starr Jordan's.

== Species ==
The recognized species in this genus are:

- Fowleria amblyuroptera (Bleeker, 1853)
- Fowleria aurita (Valenciennes, 1831) (crosseyed cardinalfish)
- Fowleria flammea G. R. Allen, 1993
- Fowleria isostigma (D. S. Jordan & Seale, 1906) (dotted cardinalfish)
- Fowleria marmorata (Alleyne & W. J. Macleay, 1877) (marbled cardinalfish)
- Fowleria polystigma (Bleeker, 1854)
- Fowleria vaiulae (D. S. Jordan & Seale, 1906) (mottled cardinalfish)
- Fowleria variegata (Valenciennes, 1832) (variegated cardinalfish)
