= Paxton concilians =

Conservation status
- Data Deficient (IUCN 3.1)

Scientific classification
- Kingdom: Animalia
- Phylum: Chordata
- Class: Actinopterygii
- Division: Teleostei
- Order: Gobiiformes
- Family: Apogonidae
- Subfamily: Paxtoninae
- Genus: Paxton; Baldwin & Johnson, 1999
- Species: P. concilians

Binomial name
- Paxton concilians C. C. Baldwin & G. D. Johnson, 1999

Species of fish

Paxton concilians, Paxton's cardinalfish, is a species of marine ray-finned fish belonging to the family Apogonidae, the cardinalfishes. This cardinalfish is only known from the northwestern coast of Western Australia in the Indian Ocean.

== Taxonomy ==
Paxton concilians was first formally described in 1999 by the American ichthyologists Carole C. Baldwin and G. David Johnson with its type locality given as off northwestern Australia, northeast of Monte Bello Islands at 20°07.2'S, 115°51.7'E to 20°07.1'S, 115°50.0'E, from a depth of 63 to 65 m (207 to 213 ft). Baldwin and Johnson described the new monospecific genus Paxton when they described this new species. This taxon has been placed in the monotypic subfamily Paxtoninae within the family Apogonidae.

== Etymology ==
Paxton concilians is the only species in the genus Paxton, this name honours the American-born Australian ichthyologist John R. Paxton of the Australian Museum, who Baldwin and Johnson regarded as a "friend and collegue" and who provided the type specimens, gently reminding Baldwin and Johnson that "you can’t judge a fish by its cover", because he first believed that the specimens represented an undescribed genus of soapfish, Grammistidae. The specific name, concilians, is Latin and means "uniting" or "bringing together", this is an allusion to the continuous dorsal fin of this species.

== Description ==
Paxton concilians has 6 spines and 19 soft rays in its dorsal fin and a single spine and 15 soft rays in its anal fin. The head and body have no scales, although they do have numerous papillary neuromasts. The eyes are slightly sunken with a thick, whitish cornea. This cardinalfish has an elongated body with a compressed cross section. It reaches a maximum standard length of 6.7 cm (2.6 in).

== Distribution and habitat ==
Paxton concilians is only known from the Indian Ocean off the northwestern coast of Western Australia near the Monte Bello Islands. This si a demersal species found at depths between 46 and 80 m (151 and 262 ft).
