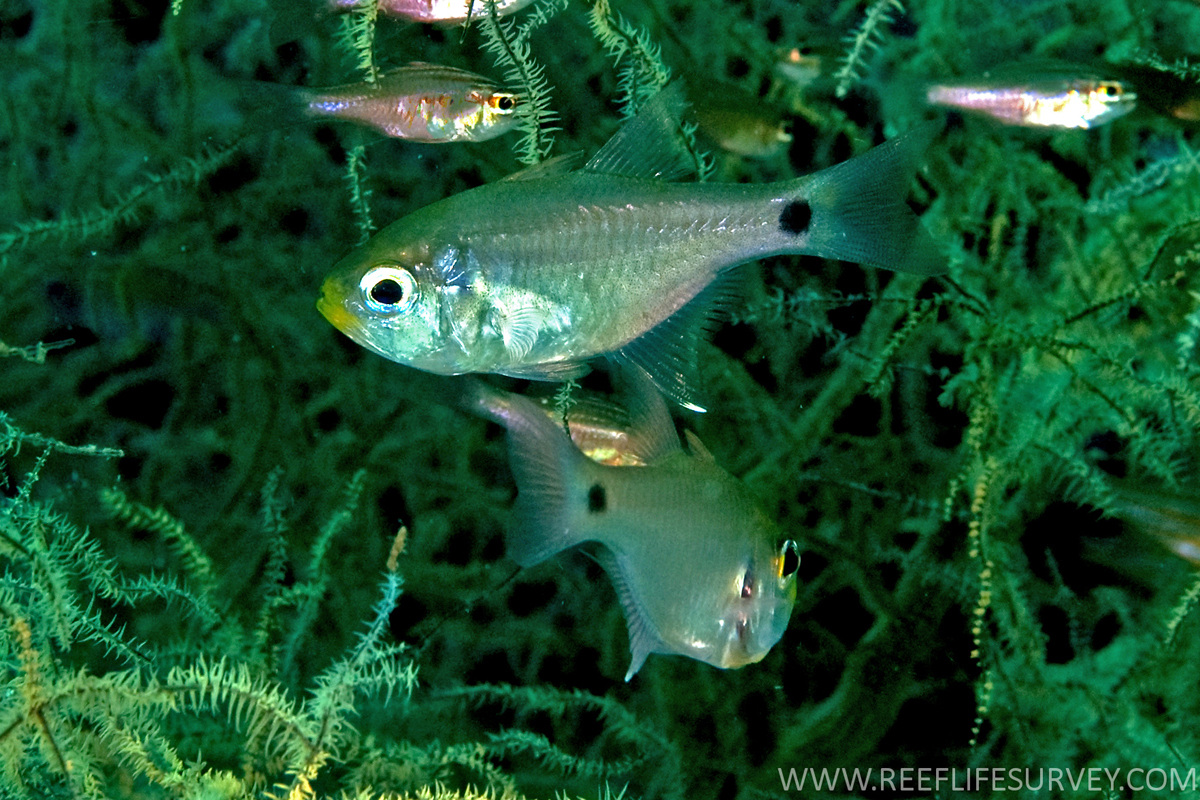

Conservation status
- Least Concern (IUCN 3.1)

Scientific classification
- Kingdom: Animalia
- Phylum: Chordata
- Class: Actinopterygii
- Division: Teleostei
- Order: Gobiiformes
- Family: Apogonidae
- Subfamily: Apogoninae
- Genus: Archamia; T. N. Gill, 1863
- Species: A. bleekeri

Binomial name
- Archamia bleekeri (Günther, 1859)

Synonyms
- Apogon bleekeri Günther, 1859; Apogon notata Day, 1868; Archamia goni Chen & Shao, 1993; Kurtamia bykhovskyi Prokofiev, 2006

= Archamia =

Genus of fishes

Archamia is a monospecific genus of marine ray-finned fish belonging to the family Apogonidae, the cardinalfishes. The only species in the genus is Archamia bleekeri, Gon's cardinalfish or the golden capped cardinalfish, which is found in the Indian Ocean and the Western Pacific Ocean.

== Taxonomy ==
Archamia Archamia bleekeri was first formally described as Apogon bleekeri in 1859 by the German-born British herpetologist and ichthyologist Albert Günther with its type locality given as Ambon Island in the Moluccas. This species is the only species in the genus Archamia which is classified in the tribe Archamini. This tribe is placed within the subfamily Apogoninae in the family Apogonidae in the suborder Apogonoidei in the order Gobiiformes.

== Etymology ==
Archamia has the prefix arch-, this is derived from the Greek archōs which means "anus", in front of Amia a non binomial name originally coined by Laurens Theodorus Gronovius for the genus Apogon which is now used as a common suffix within the cardinalfish family. This is an alluion to the greater number of anal fin rays in this species compared to those in Amia. The specific name of A. bleekeri honours the Dutch physician, herpetologist and ichthyologist Pieter Bleeker, who identified this species, albeit provisionally, as Apogon macropterus. The specimens collected from Africa are consistently deeper-bodied than those from Asia-Australia and may represent a separate species.

== Description ==
Archamia has a short and deep body with a compressed cross section and it reaches a standard length of 13.6 cm (5.4 in). The a body depth which fits into its standard length 2.6 to 3.2 times. The first dorsal fin has 6 spines and the second dorsal fin has a single spine and 9 soft rays. The anal fin has 2 spines and 15 to 17 soft rays. The preopercle has a serrated rear half of is lower edge and a smooth ridge at its angle. The body of this fish is transluscent and is a silvery grey colour, there is are yellow tints on the head and body and these can vary in intenisty, this yellow is most prominent on the snout, jaws and throat. The sides of the snout may be dotted with minute black spots, there is an ill-defined orange stripe above the base of the anal fin and a black spot, smaller than the diameter of the pupil, at the base of the caudal fin.

== Distribution and habitat ==
Archamia has an Indo-West Pacific distribution. In Africa it is found along the coast of Eastern Africa between Kenya and KwaZulu-Natal and in Asia its range extends from the southeastern Arabian Peninsula along the Indian Ocean coast to the Malay Archipelago into the Western Pacific Ocean, north as far a as Taiwan and south to along the Queensland coast in Australia. It is found at depths between 3 and 30 m (9.8 and 98.4 ft) where it may be encountered schools or in pairs on coral reefs, over silty seabeds, in magroves and over rock outcrops.
