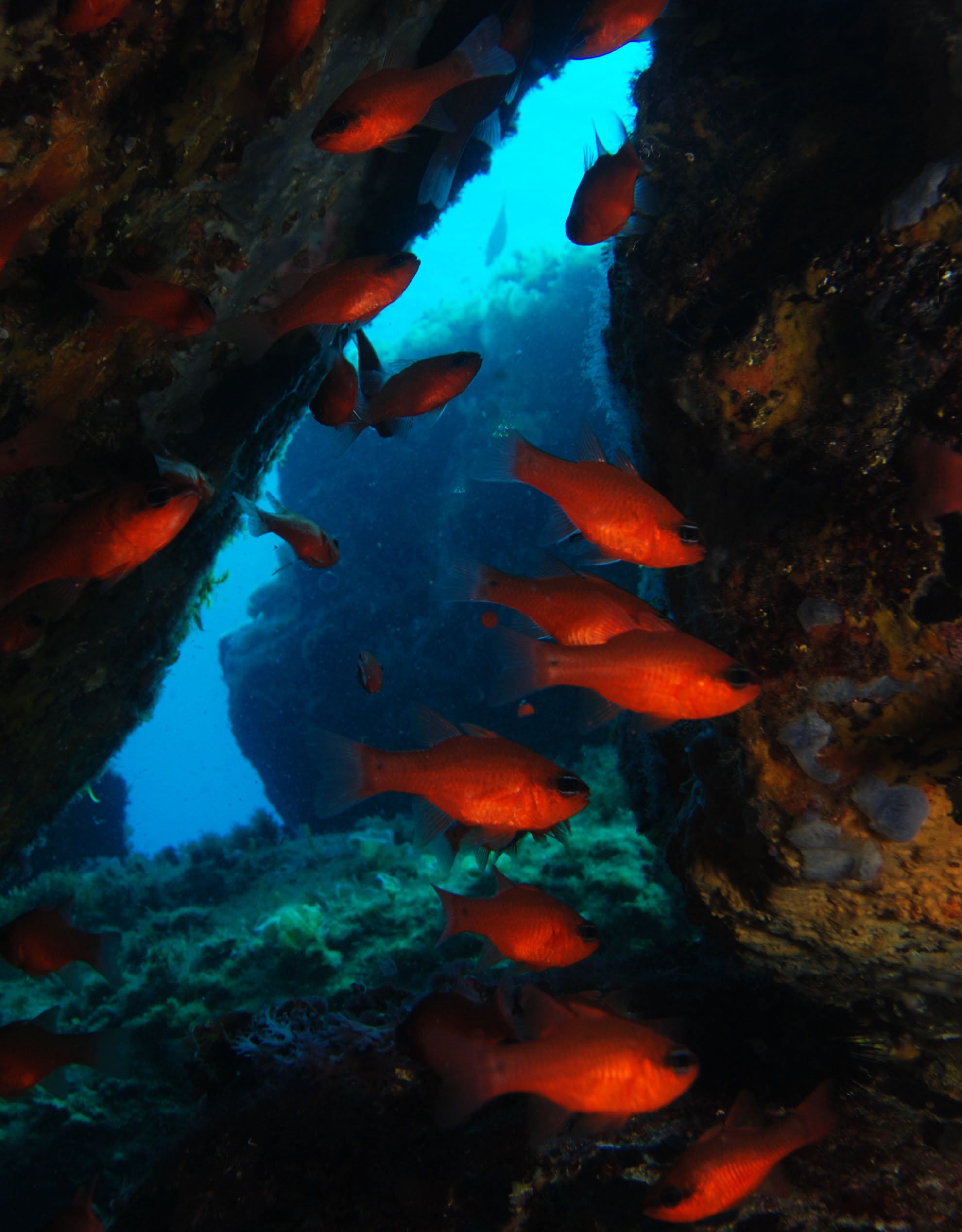
- A shoal of Mediterranean cardinalfish (Apogon imberbis)

Scientific classification
- Kingdom: Animalia
- Phylum: Chordata
- Class: Actinopterygii
- Division: Teleostei
- Order: Gobiiformes
- Family: Apogonidae
- Subfamily: Apogoninae; Günther, 1859

= Apogoninae =

Subfamily of fishes

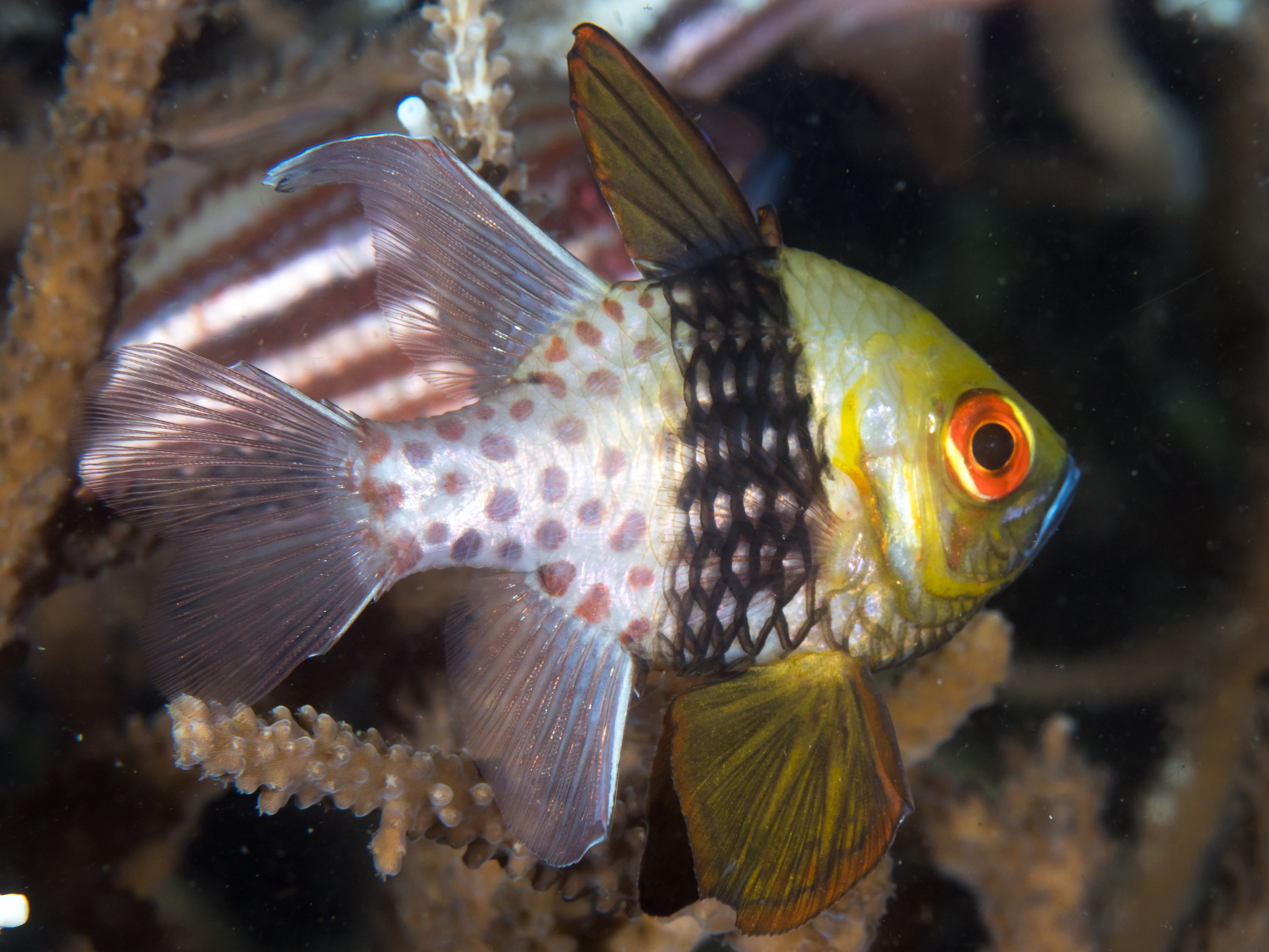
Pajama cardinalfish (Sphaeramia nematoptera)

The Apogoninae are the most species-rich and, of its shape, size, color and habitat, most diverse subfamily of cardinalfishes (Apogonidae). It can be found in coastal tropical and subtropical regions of the Indian Ocean, the eastern Pacific and the Atlantic, down to depths of 300 meters.

== Genera ==
The following genera are included in the subfamily:

- Apogon Lacépède, 1801
- Apogonichthyoides J. L. B. Smith, 1949
- Apogonichthys Bleeker, 1854
- Archamia T.N. Gill, 1863
- Astrapogon Fowler, 1907
- Cercamia J. E. Randall & C. L. Smith, 1988
- Cheilodipterus Lacépède, 1801
- Fibramia T. H. Fraser & Mabuchi, 2014
- Foa D. S. Jordan & Evermann, 1905
- Fowleria D. S. Jordan & Evermann, 1905
- Glossamia T.N. Gill, 1863
- Jaydia J. L. B. Smith, 1961
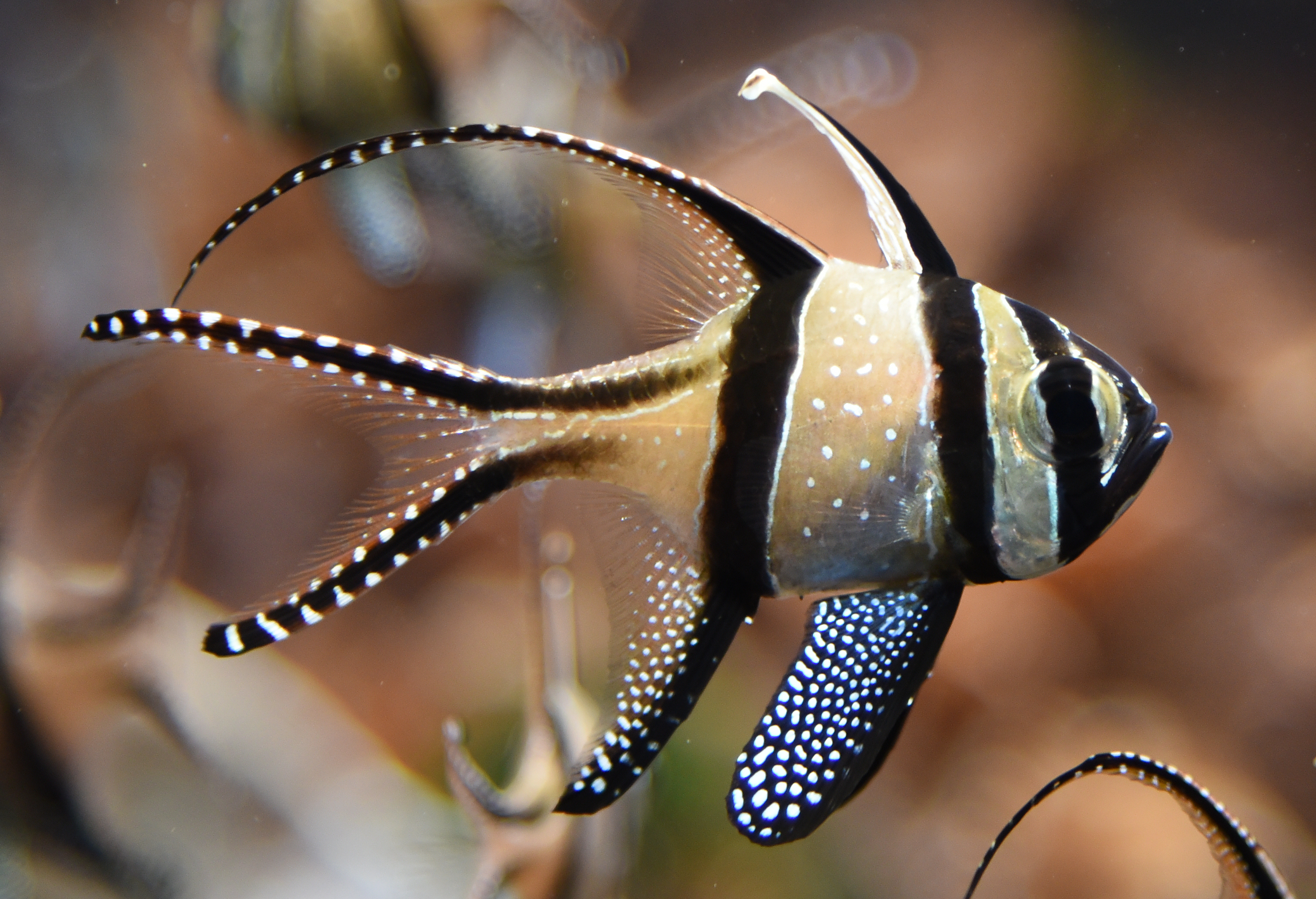
- Banggai cardinalfish (Pterapogon kauderni)
  Lachneratus T. H. Fraser & Struhsaker, 1991
- Lepidamia T. N. Gill, 1863
- Neamia H. M. Smith & Radcliffe, 1912
- Nectamia D. S. Jordan, 1917
- Ostorhinchus Lacépède, 1802
- Ozichthys T. H. Fraser, 2014
- Paroncheilus J. L. B. Smith, 1964
- Phaeoptyx T. H. Fraser & C. R. Robins, 1970
- Pristiapogon Klunzinger, 1870
- Pristicon T. H. Fraser, 1972
- Pterapogon Koumans, 1933
- Quinca Mees, 1966
- Rhabdamia M. C. W. Weber, 1909
- Siphamia M. C. W. Weber, 1909
- Sphaeramia Fowler & B. A. Bean, 1930
- Taeniamia T. H. Fraser, 2013
- Verulux T. H. Fraser, 1972
- Vincentia Castelnau, 1872
- Xeniamia Fraser & Prokofiev, 2016
- Yarica Whitley 1930
- Zapogon T. H. Fraser, 1972
- Zoramia D. S. Jordan, 1917
