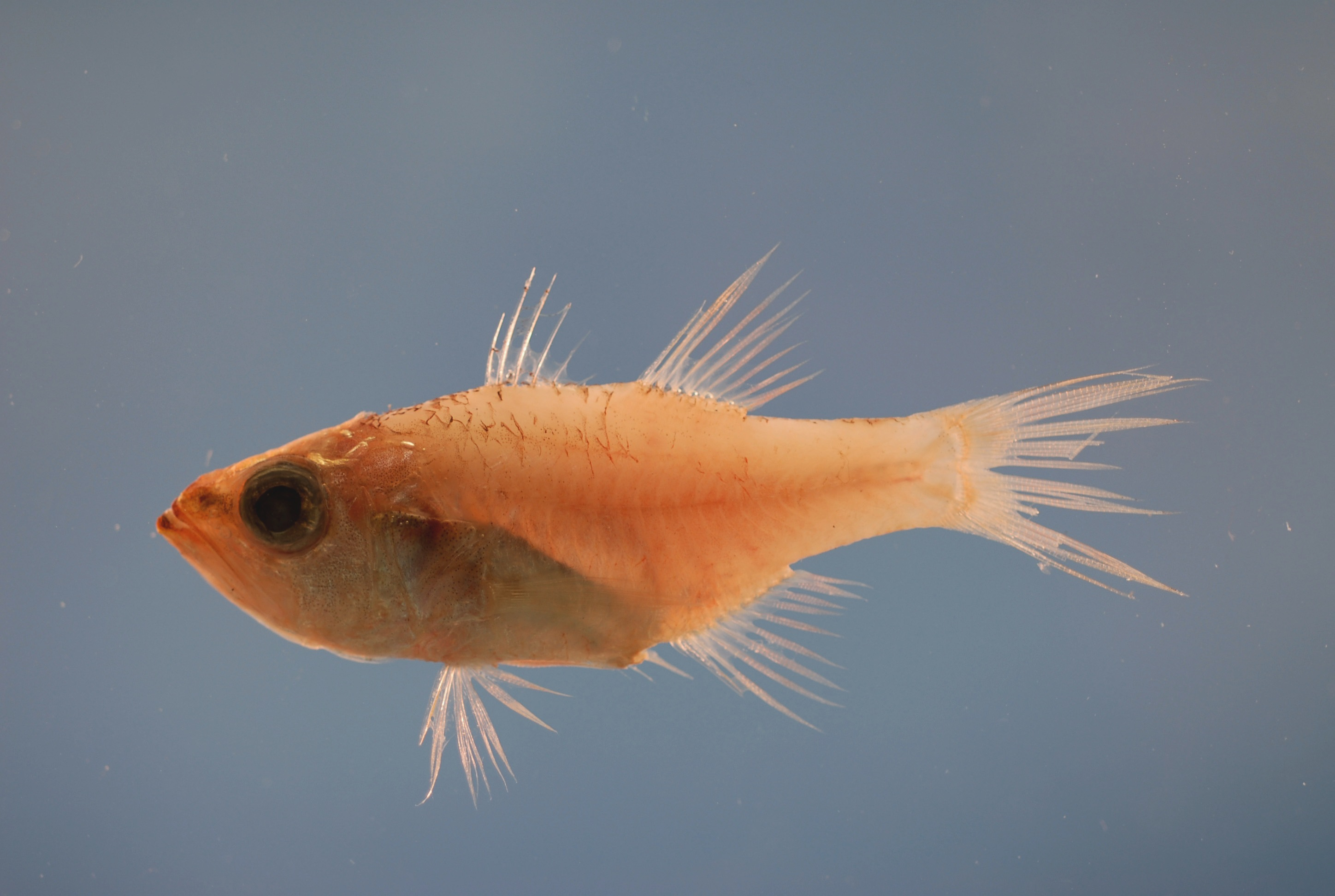

Conservation status
- Least Concern (IUCN 3.1)

Scientific classification
- Domain: Eukaryota
- Kingdom: Animalia
- Phylum: Chordata
- Class: Actinopterygii
- Order: Gobiiformes
- Family: Apogonidae
- Subfamily: Apogoninae
- Genus: Paroncheilus; J. L. B. Smith, 1964
- Species: P. affinis

Binomial name
- Paroncheilus affinis (Poey, 1875)

Synonyms
- Apogon affinis Poey, 1875; Cheilodipterus affinis (Poey, 1875); Chilodipterus affinis Poey, 1875; Paroncheilus stauchi Smith, 1964; Phaeoptyx affinis (Poey, 1875)

= Bigtooth cardinalfish =

Species of fish

The bigtooth cardinalfish or longtooth cardinalfish (Paroncheilus affinis) is a species of marine fish in the family Apogonidae and the only member of its genus. The bigtooth cardinalfish lives in the west-central Atlantic, off southern Florida, United States, and from the Bahamas to Venezuela, and as far south as Suriname. This species also is found in the east-central Atlantic and the Gulf of Guinea, and has been reported as far as Cape Verde. It is a pale orangeish colour.

== Description ==
The bigtooth cardinalfish grows to a maximum length of about 11 cm (4.3 in). It is a laterally compressed fish with a large head, short snout and large eye. The obliquely-set mouth is moderately large and the lower jaw projects forward. Each jaw has a row of tiny teeth interspersed by some large canine teeth. There are further vomerine teeth, including some small canines, on the roof of the mouth. The dorsal fin is divided into two separate fins; the first dorsal fin has seven spines and the second has seven soft rays. The anal fin has two spines and nine soft rays. The dorsal surface is a translucent salmon, orange or bronze colour, and the underside of head and body are silvery. There is a faint dark stripe extending from the mouth, through the eye to the top of the operculum, and the outer edge of the tailfin may also be dark.

== Distribution and habitat ==
The bigtooth cardinalfish is native to the tropical Atlantic Ocean. In the east, its range extends along the Atlantic coast, from Ivory Coast to Angola, including the Gulf of Guinea, the Cape Verde Islands and Ascension Island. In the west, its range extends from northeastern Florida southwards and westwards to the Bahamas and the Gulf of Mexico, and from Mexico to northwestern Cuba, the Caribbean Sea, Venezuela, Suriname and along the coast of South America to Ilha Itaparica, Brazil. It is found at depths between 15 and 300 m (50 and 980 ft), most often between 20 and 90 m (70 and 300 ft). It is usually associated with coral or rocky reefs, rocky outcrops, or sometimes gravel or rubble-covered seabed.

== Ecology ==
The bigtooth cardinalfish is nocturnal, concealing itself in crevices and caves during the day. Large schools sometimes form near the base of underwater cliffs. It is carnivorous, feeding on small fishes and squids, crustaceans and benthic invertebrates. Breeding takes place throughout the year, with a male and female forming a pair bond before spawning. This species is a mouth brooder; some authorities state that the male incubates a ball of eggs in its mouth, while other authorities state that mouth brooding is performed by both parents.

== Status ==
In general this fish faces few threats because its typical rocky habitat is not under threat and it is of no commercial interest. It is however vulnerable to predation by the invasive red lionfish (Pterois volitans) in the Caribbean region; this is a voracious venomous species which feeds at night and swallows fish the size of the bigtooth cardinalfish whole. Elsewhere it is a common fish and the International Union for Conservation of Nature has assessed its conservation status as being of least concern.
