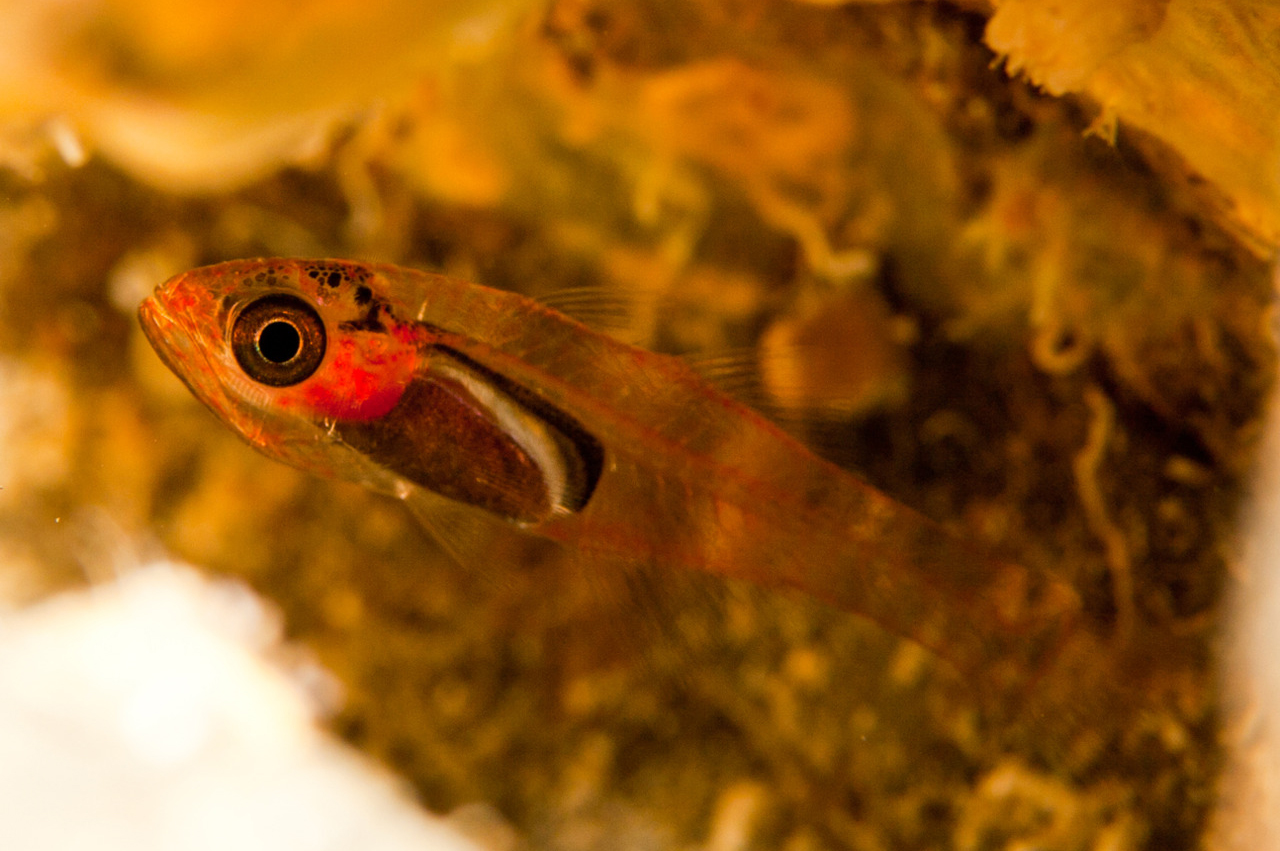
- Cercamia eremia

Scientific classification
- Kingdom: Animalia
- Phylum: Chordata
- Class: Actinopterygii
- Order: Gobiiformes
- Family: Apogonidae
- Subfamily: Apogoninae
- Genus: Cercamia; J. E. Randall & C. L. Smith, 1988

Type species
- Cercamia cladara Randall & Smith 1988

Synonyms
- Apogonoides Bleeker, 1849

= Cercamia =

Cercamia Temporal range: Late Miocene-present, 7.2–0 Ma

Genus of fishes

Cercamia is a genus of fishes in the family Apogonidae, the cardinalfishes. They are native to the Pacific and Indian Oceans.

== Species ==
The recognized species in this genus are:

- Cercamia cladara J. E. Randall & C. L. Smith, 1988
- Cercamia eremia (G. R. Allen, 1987) (glassy cardinalfish)
- Cercamia laamu Fraser, Bogorodsky, Mal & Alpermann, 2021
- Cercamia mascarene Fraser, Bogorodsky, Mal & Alpermann, 2021
- Cercamia melanogaster G. R. Allen, Erdmann & Mahardini, 2015 (blackbelly cardinalfish)
- Cercamia spio Fraser, Bogorodsky, Mal & Alpermann, 2021

The former genus Apogonoides is now thought to be synonymous with Cercamia. The extinct species †Cercamia cottreaui Arambourg, 1928 (described as Apogonoides cottreaui) is known from the Late Miocene of Algeria.
