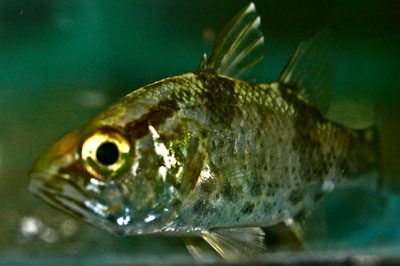
- Glossamia aprion

Scientific classification
- Kingdom: Animalia
- Phylum: Chordata
- Class: Actinopterygii
- Division: Teleostei
- Order: Gobiiformes
- Family: Apogonidae
- Subfamily: Apogoninae
- Genus: Glossamia; T. N. Gill, 1863

Type species
- Apogon aprion Richardson, 1842

= Glossamia =

Genus of fishes

Glossamia is a genus of freshwater fish in the family Apogonidae. The majority of the species are endemic to New Guinea, but G. aprion is also found in Australia.

== Species ==
The 12 recognized species in this genus are:

- Glossamia abo (Herre, 1935)
- Glossamia aprion (J. Richardson, 1842) (mouth almighty)
- Glossamia arguni Hadiaty & G. R. Allen, 2011
- Glossamia beauforti (M. C. W. Weber, 1907) (Beaufort's mouth almighty)
- Glossamia gillii (Steindachner, 1867)
- Glossamia gjellerupi (M. C. W. Weber & de Beaufort, 1929) (Gjellerup's mouth almighty)
- Glossamia heurni (M. C. W. Weber & de Beaufort, 1929)
- Glossamia narindica T. R. Roberts, 1978 (slender mouth almighty)
- Glossamia sandei (M. C. W. Weber, 1907) (Sande's mouth almighty)
- Glossamia timika G. R. Allen, Hortle & Renyaan, 2000 (Timika mouth almighty)
- Glossamia trifasciata (M. C. W. Weber, 1913) (three-barred mouth almighty)
- Glossamia wichmanni (M. C. W. Weber, 1907) (Wichmann's mouth almighty)
