= Sailfin cardinalfish =

Conservation status
- Least Concern (IUCN 3.1)

Scientific classification
- Kingdom: Animalia
- Phylum: Chordata
- Class: Actinopterygii
- Division: Teleostei
- Order: Gobiiformes
- Family: Apogonidae
- Subfamily: Apogoninae
- Genus: Quinca; Mees, 1966
- Species: Q. mirifica

Binomial name
- Quinca mirifica Mees, 1966

Synonyms
- Pterapogon mirifica (Mees, 1966)

Species of fish

The sailfin cardinalfish (Quinca mirifica) is a species of marine ray-finned fish belonging to the family Apogonidae, the cardinalfishes. This cardinalfish is the only species in the monospecific genus Quinca. It is endemic to the coastal waters of Western Australia.

== Taxonomy ==
The sailfin cardinalfish was first formally described in 1966 by the Dutch ornithologist and ichthyologist Gerlof Mees with its type locality given as Cockatoo Island in Western Australia. Mees classified this new species in the new monotypic genus Quinca. The holotype was collecetd in Yampi Sound off Cockatoo Island by "the late Mr G. A. Robinson", a resident of that island, and given to the Western Australian Museum. This taxon, along with 5 other genera, is placed in the tribe Sphaeramiini within the subfamily Apogoninae. The family Apogonidae is in the suborder Apogonoidei in the order Gobiiformes.

== Etymology ==
The sailfin cardinal fish is the only species in the gneus Quinca, a name Mees did not explain although it may be derived from the Spanish quince meaning 15, an allusion to the 15 rays in the second dorsal fin. The specific name, mirifica, is Latin and means "wonderful" or "strange", a reference to the 14 soft rays in the second dorsal fin which is more than the maximum of 10 known from other cardinalfishes at the time this species was described.

== Description ==
The sailfin cardinalfish is a comparatively large, uniformly black species with a white caudal fin. The second dorsal fin is very tall and contains 14 soft rays. The long pelvic fin extends past the origin of the anal fin. The first dorsal fin is supported by 7 spines, the second by a singlespine and 14 soft rays and the anal fin has 2 spines and 13 soft rays. This species reaches a length of 14 cm (5.5 in).

== Distribution and habitat ==
The sailfin cardinal fish is found in the eastern Indian Ocean where it is endemic to the waters off Western Australia between the North West Cape south to north of Kalumburu. It is found at depths between the surface and 15 m (49 ft) where it lives among the crevices and ledges of sheltered rocky and coral reefs.

== Behaviour ==
The sailfin cardinalfish is solitary but it forms pairs when courting. The males lose their normal deep-black coloration and change to a vivid silvery or white covering most of the body, including areas of the dorsal and pelvic fins. This change in pattern in courtship is unusual among cardinalfishes. The males are mouthbrooders and there is no larval stage.
