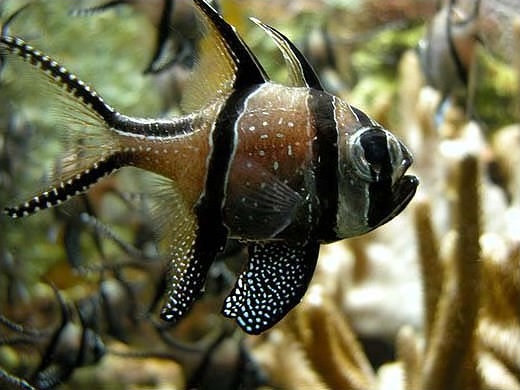
- Banggai cardinalfish (Pterapogon kauderni)

Scientific classification
- Kingdom: Animalia
- Phylum: Chordata
- Class: Actinopterygii
- Division: Teleostei
- Order: Gobiiformes
- Suborder: Apogonoidei
- Family: Apogonidae; Günther, 1859

Subfamilies
- Amioidinae; Apogoninae; Paxtoninae; Pseudaminae

= Apogonidae =

Cardinalfishes Temporal range: Maastrichtian–present

Family of ray-finned fishes

Cardinalfishes are a family, Apogonidae, of ray-finned fishes found in the Atlantic, Indian, and Pacific Oceans; they are chiefly marine, but some species are found in brackish water and a few (notably Glossamia) are found in fresh water. A handful of species are kept in aquariums and are popular as small, peaceful, and colourful fish. The family includes about 370 species.

They are generally small fish, with most species being less than 10 cm (4 in), and are often brightly coloured. They are distinguished by their large mouths, and the division of the dorsal fin into two separate fins. Most species live in tropical or subtropical waters, where they inhabit coral reefs and lagoons.

They are nocturnal, spending the day in dark crevices within the reef. At least some species brood their eggs inside the mouths of the males. Males do not feed during this incubation period. Males incubate the eggs in their mouth due to having longer heads and a larger jaw, which females do not acquire.

== Classification ==
Eschmeyer's Catalog of Fishes recognises four subfamilies of the Apogonidae:

- Subfamily Amioidinae Fraser & Mabuchi, 2014
  - Amioides H.M. Smith & Radcliffe, 1912
  - Holapogon T. H. Fraser, 1973
- Subfamily Apogoninae Günther, 1859
  - Apogon Lacépède, 1801
  - Apogonichthyoides J. L. B. Smith, 1949
  - Apogonichthys Bleeker, 1854
  - Archamia T.N. Gill, 1863
  - Astrapogon Fowler, 1907
  - Cercamia J. E. Randall & C. L. Smith, 1988
  - Cheilodipterus Lacépède, 1801
  - Fibramia T. H. Fraser & Mabuchi, 2014
  - Foa D. S. Jordan & Evermann, 1905
  - Fowleria D. S. Jordan & Evermann, 1905
  - Glossamia T.N. Gill, 1863
  - Jaydia J. L. B. Smith, 1961
  - Lachneratus T. H. Fraser & Struhsaker, 1991
  - Lepidamia T. N. Gill, 1863
  - Neamia H. M. Smith & Radcliffe, 1912
  - Nectamia D. S. Jordan, 1917
  - Ostorhinchus Lacépède, 1802
  - Paroncheilus J. L. B. Smith, 1964
  - Phaeoptyx T. H. Fraser & C. R. Robins, 1970
  - Pristiapogon Klunzinger, 1870
  - Pristicon T. H. Fraser, 1972
  - Pterapogon Koumans, 1933
  - Quinca Mees, 1966
  - Rhabdamia M. C. W. Weber, 1909
  - Siphamia M. C. W. Weber, 1909
  - Sphaeramia Fowler & B. A. Bean, 1930
  - Taeniamia T. H. Fraser, 2013
  - Verulux T. H. Fraser, 1972
  - Vincentia Castelnau, 1872
  - Xeniamia T. H. Fraser & Prokofiev, 2016
  - Yarica Whitley 1930
  - Zapogon T. H. Fraser, 1972
  - Zoramia D. S. Jordan, 1917
- Subfamily Paxtoninae Fraser & Mabuchi, 2014
  - Paxton C. C. Baldwin & G. D. Johnson, 1999
- Subfamily Pseudaminae Smith, 1954
  - Gymnapogon Regan, 1905
  - Pseudamia Bleeker, 1865
  - Pseudamiops J. L. B. Smith, 1954

=== Fossil genera ===
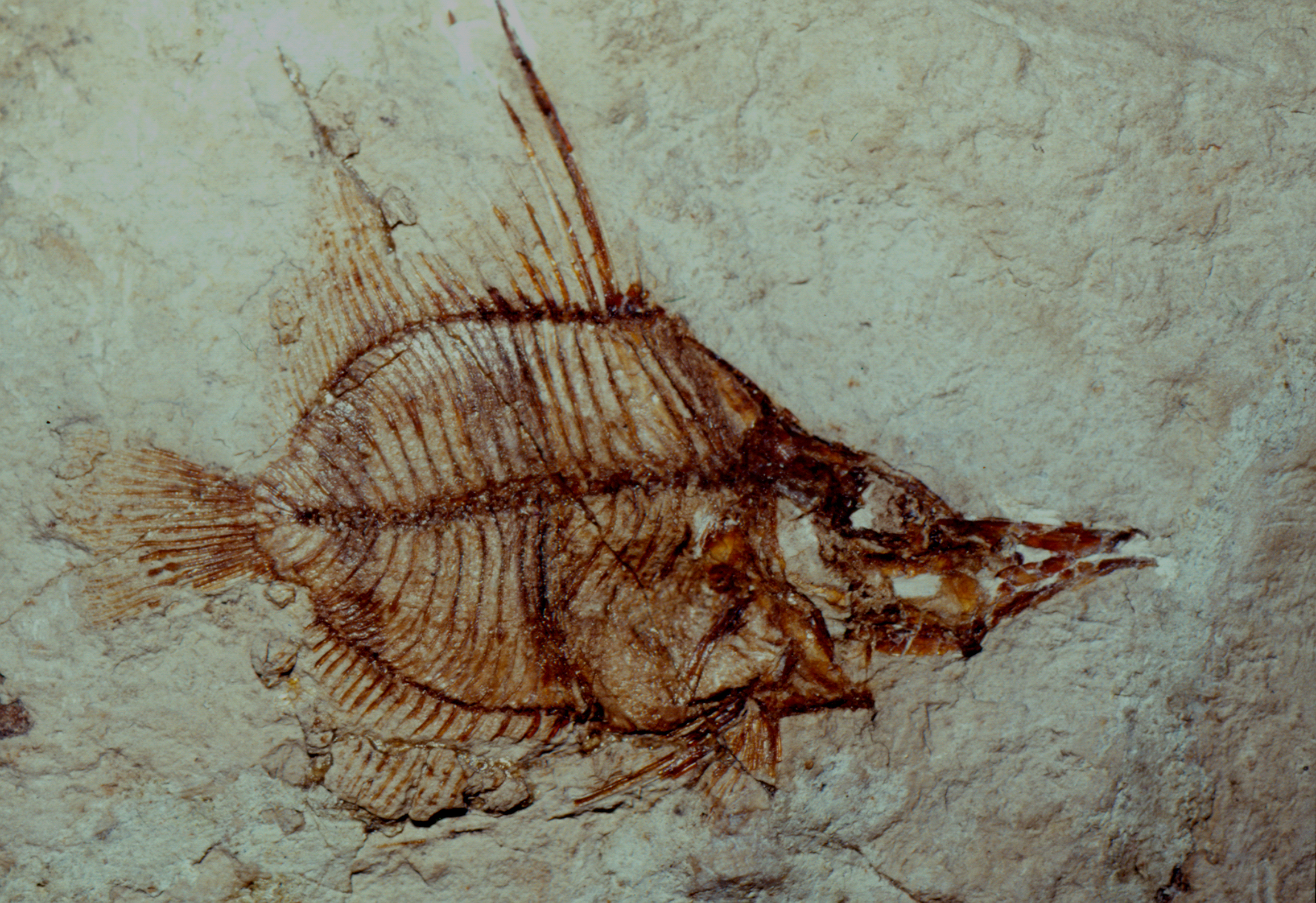
Fossil of Eosphaeramia, an Eocene cardinalfish from Italy

The following fossil genera are also placed here:

- Genus †Eosphaeramia Sorbini, 1983
- Genus †Eritima Jordan & Gilbert, 1919
- Genus †Eosphaeramia Sorbini, 1983
- Genus †Leptolumamia Bannikov & Fraser, 2016
- Subfamily Apogoninae
  - Tribe †Eoapogonini Bannikov, 2005
    - Genus †Arconiapogon Marrama, Giusberti & Carnevale, 2022
    - Genus †Apogoniscus Bannikov, 2005
    - Genus †Bolcapogon Bannikov, 2005
    - Genus †Eoapogon Bannikov, 2005
- Subfamily Pseudaminae
  - Genus †Oligopseudamia Marrama, Giusberti & Carnevale, 2022

Fossil otoliths assigned to the otolith-based genus Apogonidarum are known from the Late Cretaceous (Maastrichtian) of India and North Dakota, USA. If of apogonids, these represent the oldest record of the group.
