= Thomas H. Fraser =

Thomas Henry Fraser is an ichthyologist and expert in cardinalfishes. According to the Australian Museum website, "He is a world expert on the taxonomy of Cardinalfishes." The combtooth blennies Dodekablennos fraseri and Meiacanthus fraseri were named in honour of Fraser.
