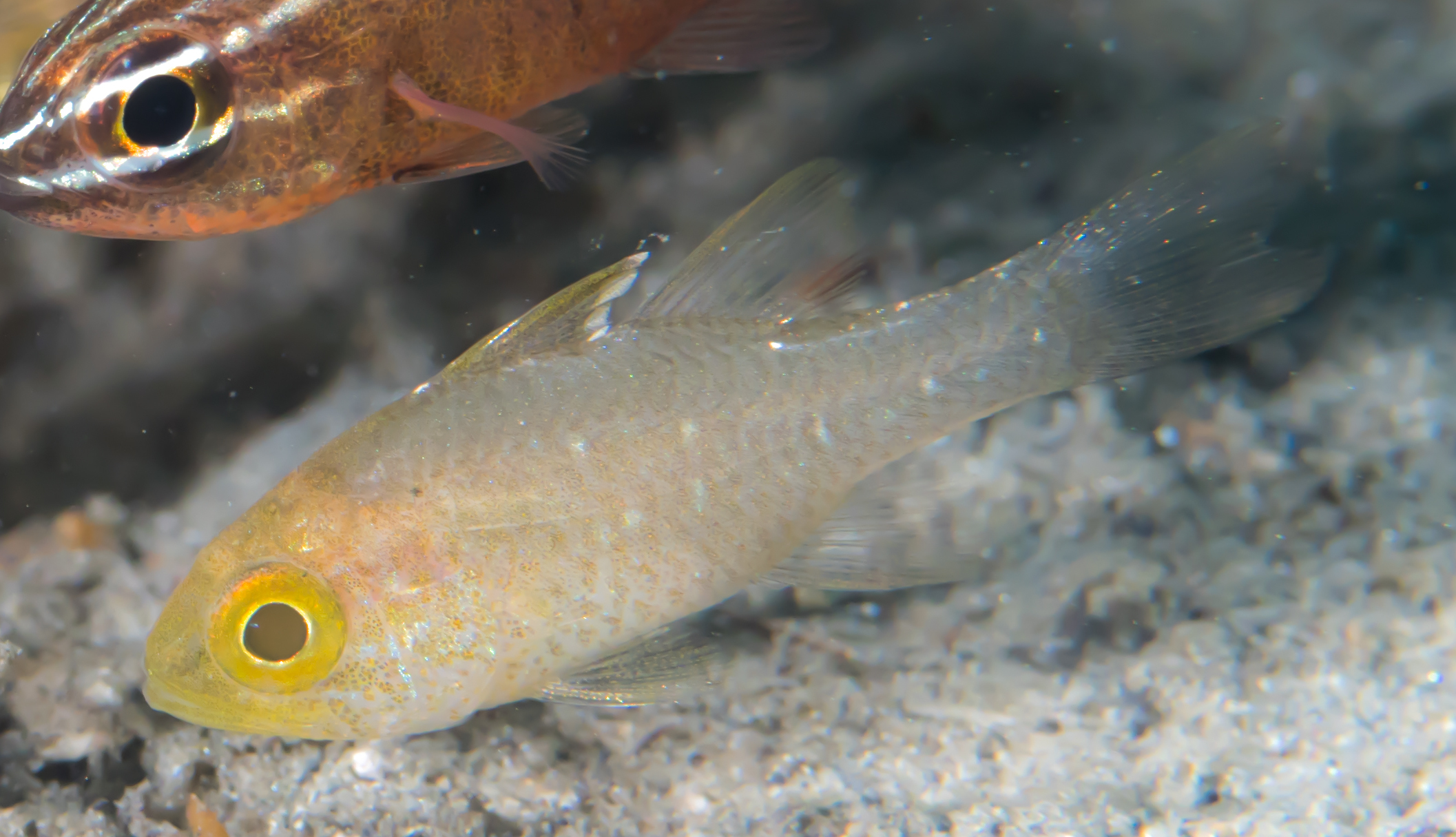

Conservation status
- Least Concern (IUCN 3.1)

Scientific classification
- Kingdom: Animalia
- Phylum: Chordata
- Class: Actinopterygii
- Division: Teleostei
- Order: Gobiiformes
- Family: Apogonidae
- Genus: Ostorhinchus
- Species: O. hoevenii

Binomial name
- Ostorhinchus hoevenii (Bleeker, 1854)

Synonyms
- Apogon hoevenii Bleeker, 1854

= Ostorhinchus hoevenii =

Species of fish

Ostorhinchus hoevenii, the frostfin cardinalfish or flag-fin cardinalfish is a species of marine ray-finned fish belonging to the family Apogonidae, the cardinalfishes. This cardinalfish is found in the Western Pacific Ocean.

== Taxonomy ==
Ostorhinchus hoevenii was first formally described as Apogon hoeveni in 1854 by the Dutch physician, herpetologist and ichthyologist Pieter Bleeker with its type locality given as Ambon Island, Molucca Islands, Indonesia. This species is now classified in the genus Ostorhinchus, which was described in 1802 by Bernard Germain de Lacépède as a monospecific genus with Ostorhinchus fleurieu its type species by monotypy. This genus is the only one in the tribe Ostorhinchini within the subfamily Apogoninae. The family Apogonidae is in the suborder Apogonoidei in the order Gobiiformes.

== Etymology ==
Ostorhinchus hoevenii is classified in the genus Ostorhinchus, this name means "bony snout" and refers to the bony, jagged edges of the jaws of O. fleurieu which are used like teeth. The specific name, hoevenii, honours the Dutch zoologist Jan van der Hoeven, who Bleeker regarded as a colleague.

== Description ==
Ostorhinchus hoevenii has a brownish body and a yellowish head, there is a white margin on the back of the first dorsal fin, and a small white spot on the upper body below the rearmost dorsal fin ray. This species has atotal of 8 dorsal fin spines and 9 dorsal fin rays, as well as 2 spines and 8 rays in the anal fin. It has a short, deep body with a compressed cross section and it reaches a total length of 6 cm (2.4 in).

== Distribution and habitat ==
Ostorhinchus hoevenii is found in the Western Pacific Ocean where it has been found as far north as the Yaeyama Islands of southern Japan south to the northern Great Barrier Reef of Australia, west as far as Java, Indonesia and east to the Solomon Islands. It is found at depths between 1 and 30 m (3 ft 3 in and 98 ft 5 in) in sheltered bays and reefs.
