= Ostorhinchus limenus =

- A Sydney Cardinalfish, Ostorhinchus limenus, at North West Solitary Island, New South Wales

Scientific classification
- Kingdom: Animalia
- Phylum: Chordata
- Class: Actinopterygii
- Division: Teleostei
- Order: Gobiiformes
- Family: Apogonidae
- Genus: Ostorhinchus
- Species: O. limenus

Binomial name
- Ostorhinchus limenus (Randall & Hoese, 1988)

Synonyms
- Apogon limenus Randall & Hoese, 1988

Species of ray-finned fish

Ostorhinchus limenus, the Sydney cardinalfish or fourbanded soldierfish, is a species of marine ray-finned fish belonging to the family Apogonidae, the cardinalfishes. This cardinalfish is found in the southwestern Pacific Ocean off southeastern Australia.

== Taxonomy ==
Ostorhinchus limenus was first formally described as Apogon limenus in 1988 by the American ichthyologists John Ernest Randall and Douglass F. Hoese with its type locality given as Bottle and Glass Rocks, at 33°52'S, 151°16'E, in Sydney Harbour, New South Wales, Australia, fron a depth of 5 to 8 m (16 to 26 ft). This species is now classified in the genus Ostorhinchus, which was described in 1802 by Bernard Germain de Lacépède as a monospecific genus with Ostorhinchus fleurieu its type species by monotypy. This genus is the only one in the tribe Ostorhinchini within the subfamily Apogoninae. The family Apogonidae is in the suborder Apogonoidei in the order Gobiiformes.

== Etymology ==
Ostorhinchus limenus is classified in the genus Ostorhinchus, this name means "bony snout" and refers to the bony, jagged edges of the jaws of O. fleurieu which are used like teeth. The specific name, limenus, is a Latinisation of the Greek limen meaning a "harbour" or "refuge", an allusion to the frequent recording of this species in harbours and bays.

== Description ==
Ostorhinchus limenus reaches a maximum total length of 14 cm (5.5 in). This species has a greyish body, with pink fins, the body has five darl=k horizontal stripes, the higher two have a wide separation from the midlateral stripe. The midlateral stripe ends on the caudal peduncle where there is a large black spot.

== Distribution and habitat ==
Ostorhinchus limenus is found in the soutwestern Pacific where it is endemic to the waters off southeastern Australia. It occurs from Fraser Island, Queensland south to eastern Victoria, maybe reaching as far as Wilsons Promontory. It occurs ate depths between 1 and 30 m (3 ft 3 in and 98 ft 5 in) on rocky reefs on bays and harbours.

== Behaviour ==
Ostorhinchus limenus is a mouthbrooder.
