= Ostorhinchus regula =

Scientific classification
- Kingdom: Animalia
- Phylum: Chordata
- Class: Actinopterygii
- Division: Teleostei
- Order: Gobiiformes
- Family: Apogonidae
- Genus: Ostorhinchus
- Species: O. regula

Binomial name
- Ostorhinchus regula (T. H. Fraser & J. E. Randall, 2003)

Synonyms
- Apogon regula Fraser & Randall, 2003

Species of fish

Ostorhinchus regula, the ruler cardinalfish, is a species of is a species of marine ray-finned fish belonging to the family Apogonidae, the cardinalfishes. This cardinalfish is found in the central Pacific Ocean.

== Taxonomy ==
Ostorhinchus regula was first formally described as Apogon regula in 2003 by the American ichthyologists Thomas Henry Fraser and John Ernest Randall with its type locality given as Condor Reef, Caroline Islands, from a depth of 55 m (180 ft). This species is now classified in the genus Ostorhinchus, which was described in 1802 by Bernard Germain de Lacépède as a monospecific genus with Ostorhinchus fleurieu its type species by monotypy. The genus Ostorhinchus is the only one in the tribe Ostorhinchini within the subfamily Apogoninae. The family Apogonidae is in the suborder Apogonoidei in the order Gobiiformes.

== Etymology ==
Ostorhinchus regula is classified in the genus Ostorhinchus, this name means "bony snout" and refers to the bony, jagged edges of the jaws of O. fleurieu which are used like teeth. The specific name, regula, is Latin for a straight edge or rule, Fraser and Randalls say ruler, measure or pattern, an allusion to the re-occurring pattern of 3 alternating dark wide stripes and three light, narrow stripes on the caudal peduncle, a pattern shared with a lot of the dark-striped species in the genus.

== Description ==
Ostorhinchus regula has a fusiform body with a maximum standard length of 3.8 cm (1.5 in), It has a total of 8 spines in the dorsal fins, and 9 soft rays in the second dorsal fin while the anal fin has 2 spines and 8 soft rays. This species has alternating golden-brownish and white stripes on the head and the body, with wide dark brown stripes on the upper and lower caudal peduncle, the midlateral stripe does not have a distinct spot, the whitish stripe reaches the rearmost 2 anal rays.

== Distribution ==
Ostorhinchus regula is known only from the Caroline and Marsiana Islands. It is found at depths between 29 and 55 m (95 and 180 ft).
