= Ostorhinchus brevispinis =

Scientific classification
- Kingdom: Animalia
- Phylum: Chordata
- Class: Actinopterygii
- Division: Teleostei
- Order: Gobiiformes
- Family: Apogonidae
- Genus: Ostorhinchus
- Species: O. brevispinis

Binomial name
- Ostorhinchus brevispinis T. H. Fraser & J. E. Randall, 2003

Synonyms
- Apogon brevispinis Fraser & Randall, 2003

Species of fish

Ostorhinchus brevispinis, the tinyspine cardinalfish, is a species of marine ray-finned fish belonging to the family Apogonidae, the cardinalfishes. This cardinalfish is found in the Pacific Ocean.

== Taxonomy ==
Ostorhinchus brevispinis was first formally described as Apogon brevispinis in 2003 by the American ichthyologists Thomas H. Fraser and John Ernest Randall with its type locality given as the West side off Areva, Rurutu, Austral Islands, South Pacific, from a depth of 46 to 48 m (151 to 157 ft). This species is now classified in the genus Ostorhinchus, which was described in 1802 as a monospecific genus with Ostorhinchus fleurieu its type species by monotypy. This genus is the only one in the tribe Ostorhinchini within the subfamily Apogoninae. The family Apogonidae is in the suborder Apogonoidei in the order Gobiiformes.

== Etymology ==
Ostorhinchus brevispinis is classified in the genus Ostorhinchus, this name means "bony snout" and refers to the bony, jagged edges of the jaws of O. fleurieu which are used like teeth. The specific name brevispinis, means "short spined", an allusion to minute first dorsal fin spine of this species.

== Description ==
Ostorhinchus brevispinis reaches a standard length of 6.2 cm (2.4 in). The first dorsal fin contains 7 spines (the first spine being tiny), the second dorsal fin has a single spine and 9 soft rays and the anal fin has 2 spines and 8 soft rays. The body is striped with alternating tan and white stripes, 5 of each. The membrane of the first dorsal fin is dark and there are dark stripes on the second dorsal fin and the anal fin.

== Distribution and habitat ==
Ostorhinchus brevispinis is found in the south central Pacific Ocean where it has been recorded from the Austral Islands and the Tuamotus in French Polynesia. However, the difficulty in observing and collecting this fish has led Fraser and Randall to predict that it is likely to have a far wider distribution. The type specimens were collected from a 45° coral slope from a depth which is too deep for typical SCUBA access.
