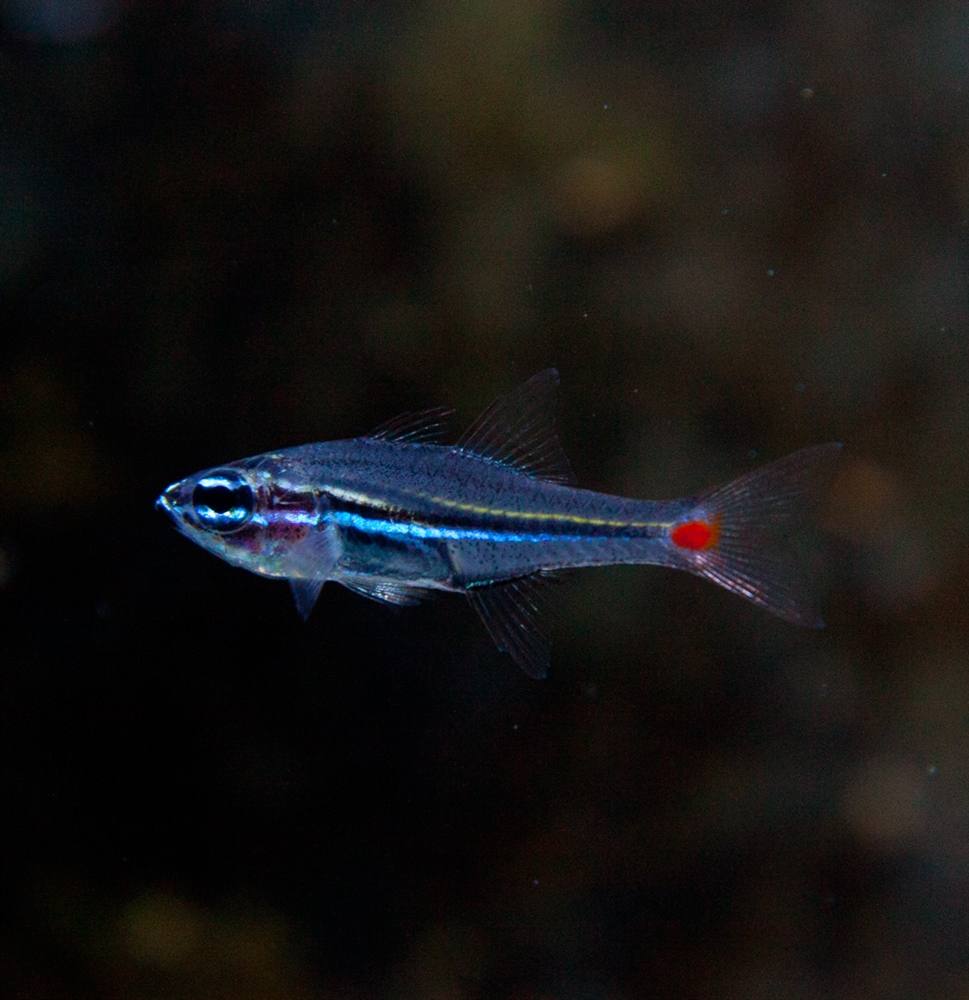

Conservation status
- Least Concern (IUCN 3.1)

Scientific classification
- Kingdom: Animalia
- Phylum: Chordata
- Class: Actinopterygii
- Division: Teleostei
- Order: Gobiiformes
- Family: Apogonidae
- Genus: Ostorhinchus
- Species: O. parvulus

Binomial name
- Ostorhinchus parvulus (H. M. Smith & Radcliffe, 1912)

Synonyms
- Amia parvula Smith & Radcliffe, 1912; Apogon parvulus (Smith & Radcliffe, 1912)

= Ostorhinchus parvulus =

Species of fish

Ostorhinchus parvulus, the redspot cardinalfish, is a species of is a species of marine ray-finned fish belonging to the family Apogonidae, the cardinalfishes. This cardinalfish is found in the western Pacific Ocean.

== Taxonomy ==
Ostorhinchus parvulus was first formally described as Amia parvula in 1912 by the American ichthyologists Hugh McCormick Smith and Lewis Radcliffe with its type locality given as Tataan Pass, Tawi Tawi Group, Philippines. This species is now classified in the genus Ostorhinchus, which was described in 1802 by Bernard Germain de Lacépède as a monospecific genus with Ostorhinchus fleurieu its type species by monotypy. Some authorities place this species in the subgenus Brephamia, of which it is the type species, along with the mini cardinalfish (O. neotes). The genus Ostorhinchus is the only one in the tribe Ostorhinchini within the subfamily Apogoninae. The family Apogonidae is in the suborder Apogonoidei in the order Gobiiformes.

== Etymology ==
Ostorhinchus parvulus is classified in the genus Ostorhinchus, this name means "bony snout" and refers to the bony, jagged edges of the jaws of O. fleurieu which are used like teeth. The specific name, parvulus, is the diminutive of the Latin word, parvus, meaning "small", an allusion to the small size of this species..

== Description ==
Ostorhinchus parvulus has an elongated body, with a compressed croos section and reaches a standard length of 4 cm (1.6 in). There are 6 spines in the first dorsal fin. 1 spine and 9 soft rays in the second dorsal fin while the anal fin has 2 spines and 8 soft rays. The unique feature of this species compared to any other transparent cardinal fihs is the red spot on the caudal peduncle.

== Distribution and habitat ==
Ostorhinchus parvulus is found in the Western Pacific Ocean from East Malaysia east to Northern Papua New Guinea north to southwestern Japan. This species is found at depths between 2 and 20 m (6 ft 7 in and 65 ft 7 in) in lagoons and coastal reefs.

== Behaviour ==
Ostorhinchus parvulus feeds on plankton. It gathers in large schools in midwater, The males are mouthbrooders.
