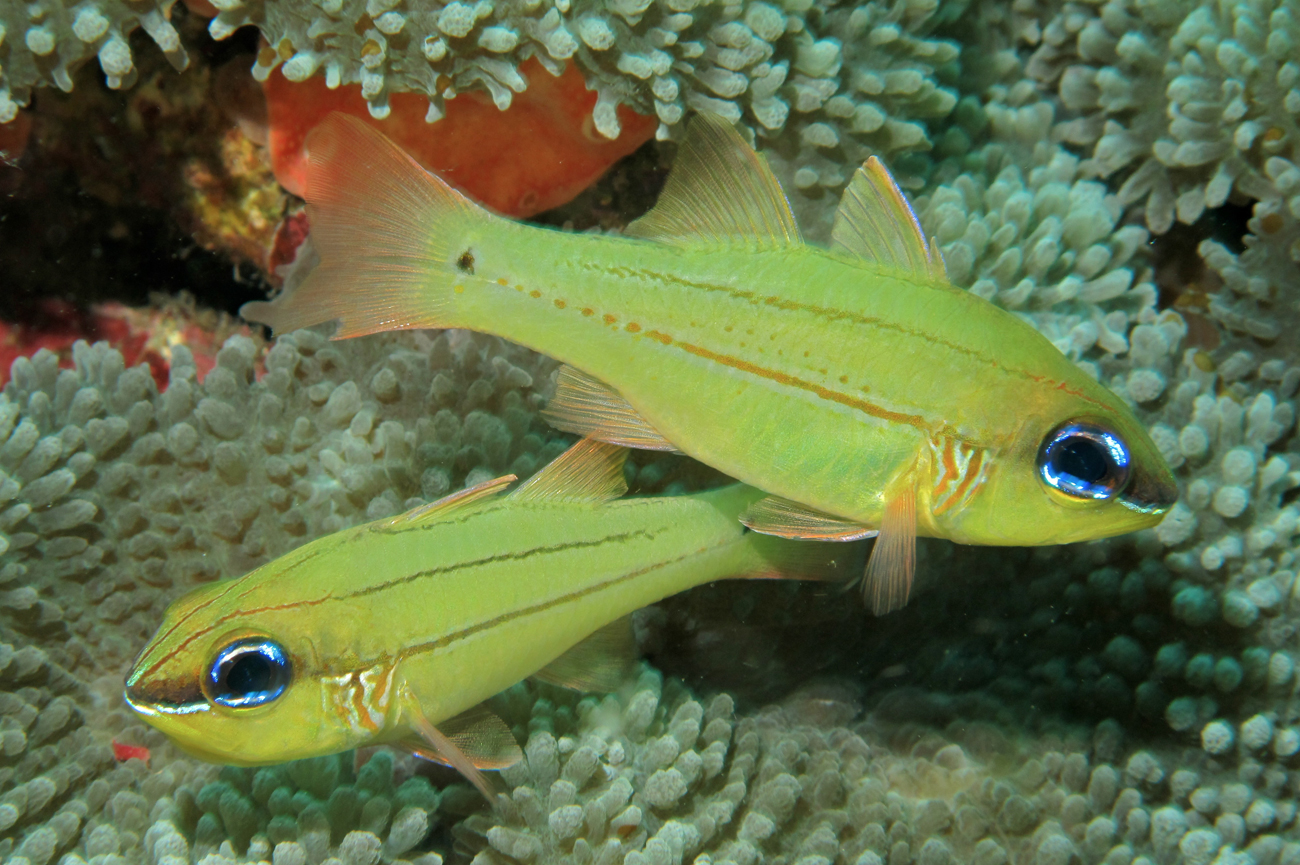

Conservation status
- Least Concern (IUCN 3.1)

Scientific classification
- Kingdom: Animalia
- Phylum: Chordata
- Class: Actinopterygii
- Division: Teleostei
- Order: Gobiiformes
- Family: Apogonidae
- Genus: Ostorhinchus
- Species: O. sealei

Binomial name
- Ostorhinchus sealei (Fowler, 1918)

Synonyms
- Amia sealei Fowler, 1918; Apogon sealei (Fowler, 1918)

= Ostorhinchus sealei =

Species of fish

Ostorhinchus sealei, Seale's cardinalfish or the cheek-barred cardinalfish, is a species of is a species of marine ray-finned fish belonging to the family Apogonidae, the cardinalfishes. This cardinalfish is found in the western Pacific Ocean.

== Taxonomy ==
Ostorhinchus sealei was first formally described as Amia sealei in 1918 by the American biologist Henry Weed Fowler with its type locality given as the Philippines. This species is now classified in the genus Ostorhinchus, which was described in 1802 by Bernard Germain de Lacépède as a monospecific genus with Ostorhinchus fleurieu its type species by monotypy. The genus Ostorhinchus is the only one in the tribe Ostorhinchini within the subfamily Apogoninae. The family Apogonidae is in the suborder Apogonoidei in the order Gobiiformes.

== Etymology ==
Ostorhinchus sealei is classified in the genus Ostorhinchus, this name means "bony snout" and refers to the bony, jagged edges of the jaws of O. fleurieu which are used like teeth. The specific name, sealei, honours the American ichthyologist Alvin Seale, recognising his work on fisheries in the Philippines.

== Description ==
Ostorhinchus sealei has aelongated body woth a comptessed cross section and it reaches a maximum total length of 10 cm (3.9 in), although a stadard length of 7.7 cm (3.0 in) is more typical. This species has a total of 8 spines and 8 soft rays in its dorsal fins while there are 2 spines and 8 soft rays in its anal fin. The overall colour is pale yellowa pair of thin brown horizontal stripes along the upper flanks. There are brown bars with pale edges on the gill cover.

== Distribution and habitat ==
Ostorhinchus sealei is found in the western Pacific Ocean from eastern Borneo to the Solomon Islands, north to the Philippines and Palau and south to the Ashmore and Hibernia reefs in the Australian Timor Sea. Seale's cardinalfish is typically found on coastal fringing reefs or patch reefs at depths down to 25 m (82 ft).

== Behaviour ==
Ostorhinchus sealei is frequently encountered in pairs or in schools among branching corals such as Acropora. These fishes shelter in among the coral in the day and emerge to forage at night, feeding on zooplankton and benthic invertebrates. Seale's cardinalfish forms distinct pairs during courtship. The males mouthbrood the fertilised eggs up to the point where they are ready to hatch.
