= Ostorhinchus nigrofasciatus =

Conservation status
- Least Concern (IUCN 3.1)

Scientific classification
- Kingdom: Animalia
- Phylum: Chordata
- Class: Actinopterygii
- Division: Teleostei
- Order: Gobiiformes
- Family: Apogonidae
- Genus: Ostorhinchus
- Species: O. nigrofasciatus

Binomial name
- Ostorhinchus nigrofasciatus (Lachner, 1953)

Synonyms
- Apogon nigrofasciatus Lachner, 1953

Species of fish

Ostorhinchus nigrofasciatus, the blackstripe cardinalfish, is a species of is a species of marine ray-finned fish belonging to the family Apogonidae, the cardinalfishes. This cardinalfish is found in the Indian and western Pacific Oceans.

== Taxonomy ==
Ostorhinchus nigrofasciatus was first formally described as Apogon nigrofasciatus in 1953 by the American ichthyologist Ernest A. Lachner with its type locality given as Yuro Island, Bikini Atoll, Marshall Islands, western Pacific. This species is now classified in the genus Ostorhinchus, which was described in 1802 by Bernard Germain de Lacépède as a monospecific genus with Ostorhinchus fleurieu its type species by monotypy. It has been proposed that this taxon is actually a species complex made up of at least 3 taxa. The genus Ostorhinchus is the only one in the tribe Ostorhinchini within the subfamily Apogoninae. The family Apogonidae is in the suborder Apogonoidei in the order Gobiiformes.

== Etymology ==
Ostorhinchus nigrofasciatus is classified in the genus Ostorhinchus, this name means "bony snout" and refers to the bony, jagged edges of the jaws of O. fleurieu which are used like teeth. The specific name, nigrofasciatus, means of the "black banded", an allusion to the five black longitudinal stripes on this fish.

== Description ==
Ostorhinchus nigrofasciatus has an elongated body with a compressed cross section and reaches a maximum total length of 10 cm (3.9 in). This species has 7 spines in the first dorsal fin and 1 spine and 9 soft rays in the second dorsal fin while the anal fin contains 2 spines and 8 soft rays. There are five dark stripes, interspersed with narrower paler stripes along the head and body. the fins are pink.

== Distribution and habitat ==
Ostorhinchus nigrofasciatus has a wide Indo-West Pacific distribution. This species is found in the Indian Ocean from the Red Sea, south to Mozambique, the Comoros and Madagascar, the Maldives, Lakshadweep, Andaman and Nicobar Islands and the Rowley Shoals in Western Australia. It is then found throughout the Malay Archipelago into the Western Pacific Ocean reaching as far east as French Polynesia, north to southwestern Japan and south to the Great Barrier Reef and southeastern Australia. The blackstripe cardinalfish lives on reef flats and shallow lagoon reefs. It is found at depsth between 1 and 50 m (3 ft 3 in and 164 ft 1 in).

== Behaviour ==
Ostorhinchus nigrofasciatus is typically encountered as individuals or in pairs under ledges and in crevices. It emerges at night to feed on small benthic invertebrates. This species is a mouthbrooder.
