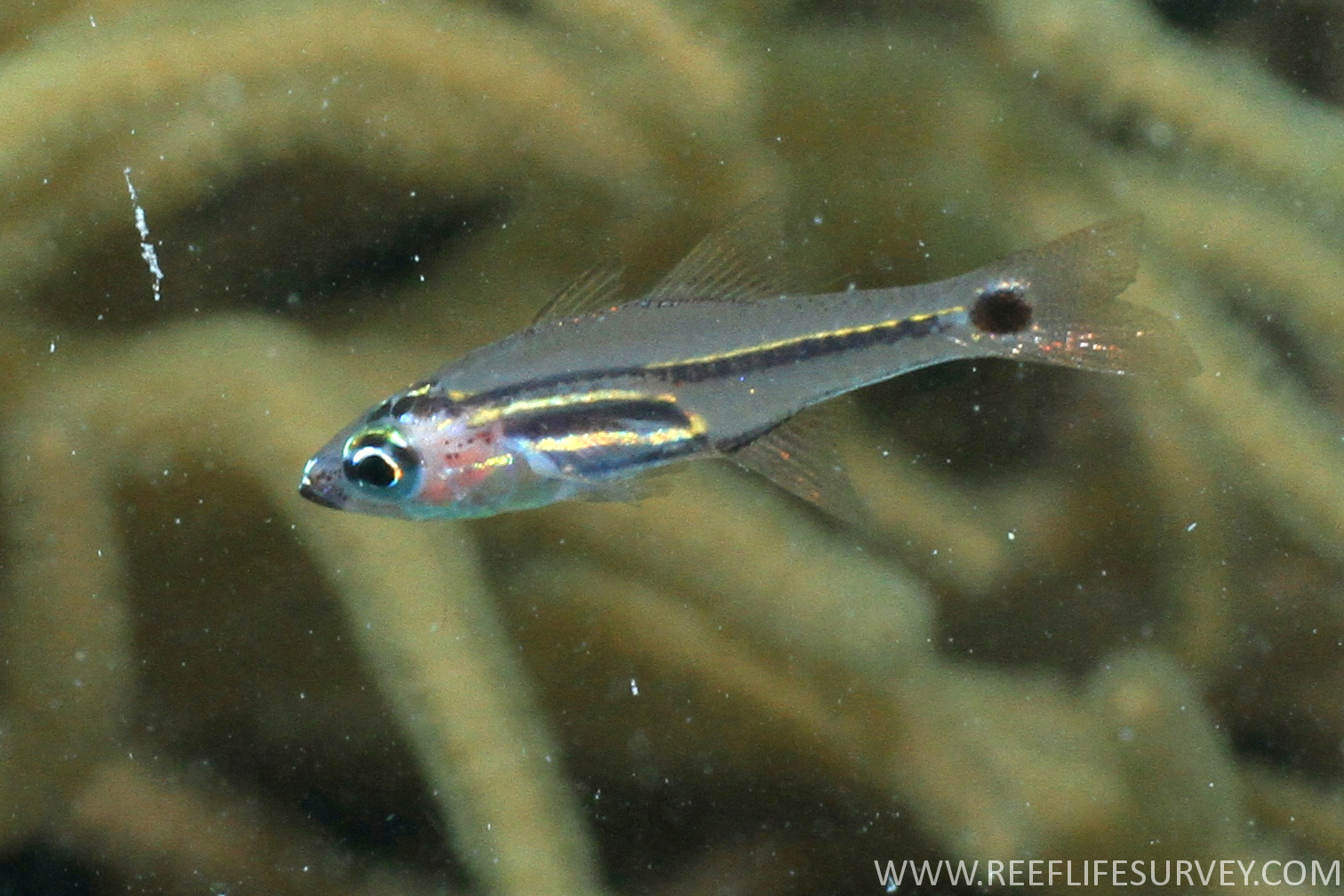
- Apogon neotes

Conservation status
- Least Concern (IUCN 3.1)

Scientific classification
- Kingdom: Animalia
- Phylum: Chordata
- Class: Actinopterygii
- Division: Teleostei
- Order: Gobiiformes
- Family: Apogonidae
- Genus: Ostorhinchus
- Species: O. neotes

Binomial name
- Ostorhinchus neotes (G. R. Allen, Kuiter & J. E. Randall, 1994)

Synonyms
- Apogon neotes' G. R. Allen, Kuiter & J. E. Randall, 1994

= Ostorhinchus neotes =

Species of fish

Ostorhinchus neotes, the mini cardinalfish or larval cardinalfish, is a species of is a species of marine ray-finned fish belonging to the family Apogonidae, the cardinalfishes. This cardinalfish is found in the eastern Indian and western Pacific Oceans.

== Taxonomy ==
Ostorhinchus neotes was first formally described as Apogon neotes in 1994 by Gerald R. Allen, Rudie Hermann Kuiter and John Ernest Randall with its type locality given as Pasar Sari Reef, outer Maumere Bay, Flores, Indonesia, at about 8°23'S, 122°13'E, from a depth of 20 m (66 ft). This species is now classified in the genus Ostorhinchus, which was described in 1802 by Bernard Germain de Lacépède as a monospecific genus with Ostorhinchus fleurieu its type species by monotypy. Some authorities place this species in the subgenus Brephamia along with the red-spot cardinalfish (O. parvulus). The genus Ostorhinchus is the only one in the tribe Ostorhinchini within the subfamily Apogoninae. The family Apogonidae is in the suborder Apogonoidei in the order Gobiiformes.

== Etymology ==
Ostorhinchus neotes is classified in the genus Ostorhinchus, this name means "bony snout" and refers to the bony, jagged edges of the jaws of O. fleurieu which are used like teeth. The specific name, neotes, means of the "youth", an allusion to the resemblance of the neotenic species to juveniles of other species.

== Description ==
Ostorhinchus neotes has an elongated body and reaches a standard length of 2.7 cm (1.1 in). This species has 6 spines in the first dorsal fin and 1 spine and 9 soft rays in the second dorsal fin while the anal fin contains 2 spines and 8 soft rays. It is a cardinal fish with almost transparent skin, there is a black internal stripe from the rear of the eye to the caudal peduncle with a large black spot on the base of the caudal fin. The abodmen shows black colouration internally. A white stripe runs from beneath the eye across the belly. There is black colouration along the base of both the dorsal fin and the anal fin.

== Distribution and habitat ==
Ostorhinchus neotes is found from Flores in Indonesia east to Palau and New Ireland in Papua New Guinea, north to Philippines, south to Solomon Islands. It is also found on the Great Barrier Reef in Australia. Its habiata is clear lagoons and outer reefs, at depths between 3 and 25 m (9.8 and 82.0 ft).

== Behaviour ==
Ostorhinchus neotes hides in caves and crevid=ces during the days. It forms schools along reef walls and slopes in areas wth an abundance of coral. The males are mouthbrooders.
