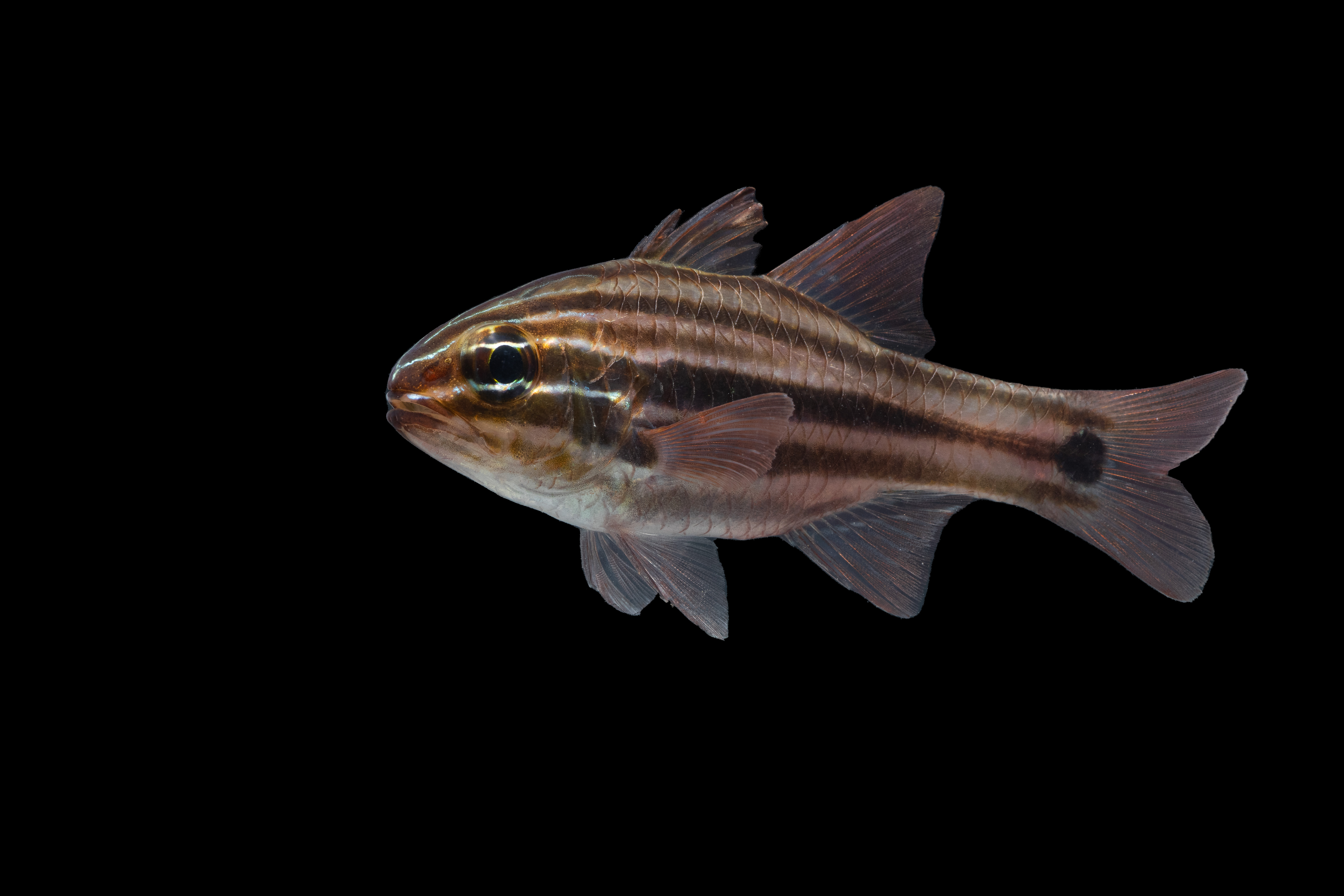

Conservation status
- Least Concern (IUCN 3.1)

Scientific classification
- Kingdom: Animalia
- Phylum: Chordata
- Class: Actinopterygii
- Division: Teleostei
- Order: Gobiiformes
- Family: Apogonidae
- Genus: Ostorhinchus
- Species: O. cookii

Binomial name
- Ostorhinchus cookii W. J. Macleay, 1881

Synonyms
- Apogon cookii W. J. Macleay, 1881; Apogon melanotaenia Regan, 1905; Amia robusta H. M. Smith & Radcliffe, 1911

= Ostorhinchus cookii =

Species of fish

Ostorhinchus cookii, Cook's cardinalfish, Cook's soldierfish, blackbanded cardinal, blackbanded cardinalfish, is a species of marine ray-finned fish belonging to the family Apogonidae, the cardinalfishes. This cardinalfish is found in the Indian Ocean and in the Pacific Ocean.

== Taxonomy ==
Ostorhinchus cookii was first formally described as Apogon cookii in 1905 by the Scottish-born Australian ichthyologist William John Macleay with its type locality given as the Endeavour River and Erub Island in Queensland, Australia. This species is now classified in the genus Ostorhinchus, which was described in 1802 as a monospecific genus with Ostorhinchus fleurieu its type species by monotypy. This genus is the only one in the tribe Ostorhinchini within the subfamily Apogoninae. The family Apogonidae is in the suborder Apogonoidei in the order Gobiiformes.

== Etymology ==
Ostorhinchus cookii is classified in the genus Ostorhinchus, this name means "bony snout" and refers to the bony, jagged edges of the jaws of O. fleurieu which are used like teeth. Macleay did not reveal whi the specific name honours but it is almost certainly Captain James Cook, the british explorer and Royal Navy officer who beached his ship, HMS Endeavour, for repairs on the Endeavour River, which he named after it.

== Description ==
Ostorhinchus cookii reaches a total length of 10 cm (3.9 in). The first dorsal fin contains 7 spines, the second dorsal fin has a single spine and 9 soft rays and the anal fin has 2 spines and 8 soft rays. There are 5 or 6 yellowish-brown to dark brown stripes, one of which is an incomplete stripe that runs from the upper rear edge of the eye to underneath the second dorsal fin. The midlateral stripe ends in an obvious black spot on the caudal peduncle.

== Distribution and habitat ==
Ostorhinchus cookii has a wide Indo-Pacific distribution from the eastern coats of Africa from the Red Sea to KwaZulu Natal in South Africa east across the Indian Ocean, but not the Mascarenes, the British Indian Ocean Territory or the Persian Gulf, into Southeast Asia and the Malay Archipelago and into the Pacific south to Asutralia, north to southern Japan and east to New Caledonia. Cook's cardinalfish is found at depths between 1 and 10 m (3 ft 3 in and 32 ft 10 in), it is encountered solitarily or in small schools on shallow coastal reefs in sheltered bays and lagoons.
