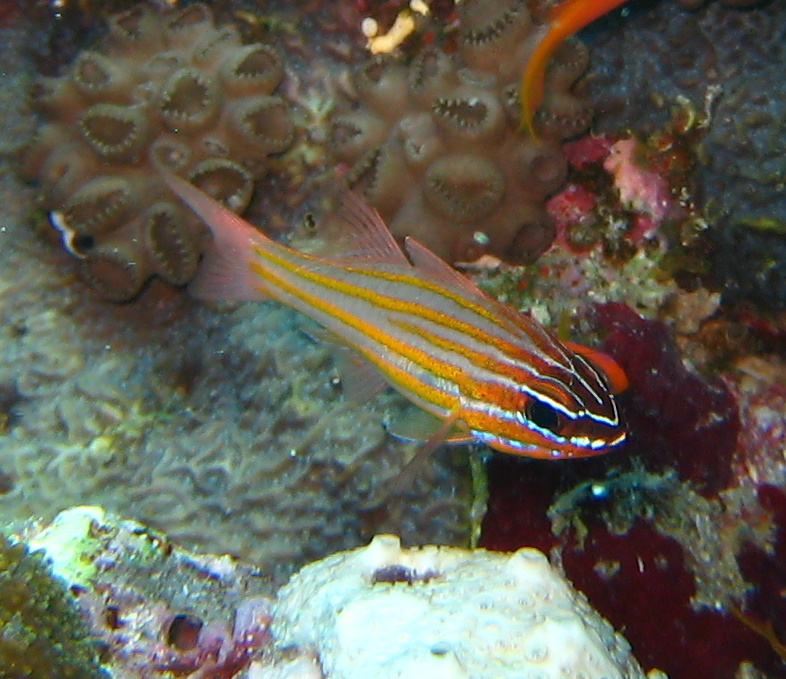

Conservation status
- Least Concern (IUCN 3.1)

Scientific classification
- Kingdom: Animalia
- Phylum: Chordata
- Class: Actinopterygii
- Order: Gobiiformes
- Family: Apogonidae
- Genus: Ostorhinchus
- Species: O. cyanosoma

Binomial name
- Ostorhinchus cyanosoma (Bleeker, 1853)

Synonyms
- Apogon cyanosoma Bleeker, 1853

= Ostorhinchus cyanosoma =

Species of fish

Ostorhinchus cyanosoma, commonly known as the yellow-striped cardinalfish, goldenstriped cardinalfish, or the orange-lined cardinalfish, is a species of marine fish in the cardinalfish family (family Apogonidae) of order Perciformes. It is native to the Indo-West Pacific.

O. cyanosoma is usually a blueish silver color with orange-yellow stripes, and grows to be an average of 6 centimeters. It lives in waters up to 50m in depth, often in lagoons or coral reefs. It is active during the nighttime, feeding on small plants and animals, mostly plankton. It has been the subject of research to test what might happen to marine life by the year 2100, due to predicted carbon dioxide levels in the atmosphere.

== Taxonomy ==
Cladogram

- - O. moluccensis
  - - O. taeniophorus
    - - O. selas
      - O. properuptus
    - - - O. cyanosoma
        - O. rubrimacula
      - - O. holotaenia
        - O. luteus

Selected genetic neighbours

The prolific Dutch East Indies-resident ichthyologist Pieter Bleeker first described this species in 1853 from a specimen taken at Lawajong off Solor Island in modern Indonesia's East Nusa Tenggara province. His unique, original holotype is lodged at the Naturalis Biodiversity Center in the Netherlands.

=== Etymology ===
No one has described a synonymous species, so Bleeker's original species name cyanosoma remains unchallenged. However, the genus Apogon which he placed it in masked significant differences between species. More recently, on the basis of physical (2005) and genetic (2014) characteristics, it has been transferred into the genus Ostorhinchus.

On the journey to dissecting the O. cyanosoma species complex now incorporating O. cyanosoma, O. rubrimacula, O. wassinki, and O. properuptus, the last was for a while considered a synonym of O. cyanosoma.

== Description ==
Large examples of Ostorhinchus cyanosoma grow to 8 cm in length although its average length is 6 cm. The fish is colored silver with a blueish tinge, and has six orange-yellow stripes including a short stripe behind the eye.

A new species (Ostorhinchus rubrimacula) was separated out in 1998 from the O. cyanosoma species complex, with almost identical morphology but with a pinkish-red spot on the tail base, and the genetics were confirmed in 2014. Notably, whilst Bleeker noted red fins ('pinnis rubris') in his original sample, he never noted a red tail spot.

=== Meristics ===
Using a shorthand meristics formula, O. cyanosoma can be described as having:

D, VII + I,9

A II,8

P, 14

LL, 24

GR, 4–5 + 16–19

== Distribution and habitat ==
=== Range ===
The most comprehensive recent authority locates O. cyanosoma ranging across the Indo-Pacific, from the Red Sea south to east Africa, east via western Australia and Queensland to New Caledonia, and north to Ryukyu and Ogasawara islands.

=== Settlement ===
It lives in clear water areas of lagoons and shallow reefs, inhabiting waters from 1 to 50 meters (usually above 15m), and makes its home under ledges, in holes, and in between the spines of sea urchins.

Coral reef fish settlement tends to be dominated by larval recruitment, but in at least part of Australia's Great Barrier Reef, around one third of recruitment of O. cyanosoma at any given coral reef patch tends to be by adult and juvenile migration across intervening sand and coral debris.

Within the large aggregations in which O. cyanosoma prefers, stable male-female pairs are often found. Individuals in pairs are more likely to live in one site, and to be able to return to that site if removed (with or without their partner), than are unpaired individuals. Retaining a fixed spatial refuge on a reef may be a crucial factor in surviving the often ferocious piscivorous predation found there.

=== Parasites ===
O. cyanosoma specimens have been found with gall bladder infections of Ceratomyxa cyanosomae, Ceratomyxa cardinalis, Ellipsomyxa apogoni, and Zschokkella ohlalae,. Two species have also been found in skeletal muscle cells: Kudoa cheilodipteri and Kudoa whippsi. These tiny cnidarian parasites from class Myxosporea are doubly fascinating because this group can require two intermediate hosts involving two sexual stages (an extremely rare phenomenon in the parasite world).

== Behavior ==
=== Diet ===
O. cyanosoma is mainly a nocturnal planktivore, emerging from hiding in coral caves and crevices to feed by hovering just above sandy microhabitats on coral reef flats. By defecating during the daytime in a non-feeding microhabitat, O. cyanosoma probably helps cycle reef nutrients around different communities on the reef. It appears to prefer to eat small benthic sergestid crustaceans rather than the planktonic larvae to be found higher in the water column. However, seasonal or sampling effects may play a role in defining the diet, since in certain years, certain sites appear to suggest that O. cyanosoma is actually eating significant amounts of planktonic copepods and crustacean larvae.

Although its wide mouth gape may be well suited to eating benthic prey, consumption of varying types of prey by cardinalfishes with different mouth shapes appears in reality to be better correlated with varying availability (i.e. many mouth shapes can still make generalist species).

=== Reproduction ===
O. cyanosoma is a paternal mouthbrooder. This is likely to be a more important reason for the sexual dimorphism shown by the male's wider gape and more protruding lower jaw, than is its prey specificity. A bigger mouth allows for more eggs to be protected from predation, and for better water circulation (for oxygenation in both eggs and parent).

Pair bonding in O. cyanosoma does not appear to provide the expected genetic benefits of monogamy, indeed like many pair bonding fishes in its family, predation seems to have driven it rather than reproductive exclusivity.

== Importance to humans ==
=== Tourism ===
Often stationary and visible low on the reef during the day time, aggregations of O. cyanosoma add to the captivating underwater pallette enjoyed by recreational Scuba divers, whose presence also contributes significantly to local economies in often poorer tropical countries.

=== Aquariums ===
Export of live specimens contributes to the enjoyment of marine aquarium hobbyists, which if managed appropriately, can also benefit local, often poorer, communities.

=== Research ===
O. cyanosoma has been used as a laboratory experimental animal to test what might happen to marine life by the year 2100, given predicted atmospheric levels of carbon dioxide. It appears that the negative effects on fish metabolic rate (and related survival) of ocean acidification caused by extra carbon dioxide dissolution could be equivalent to an extra 3 °C of water temperature (which global warming is already causing). Reef fish populations in higher (cooler) latitudes appear to have more capacity to cope with rising temperatures and acidification than those nearer the equator.
