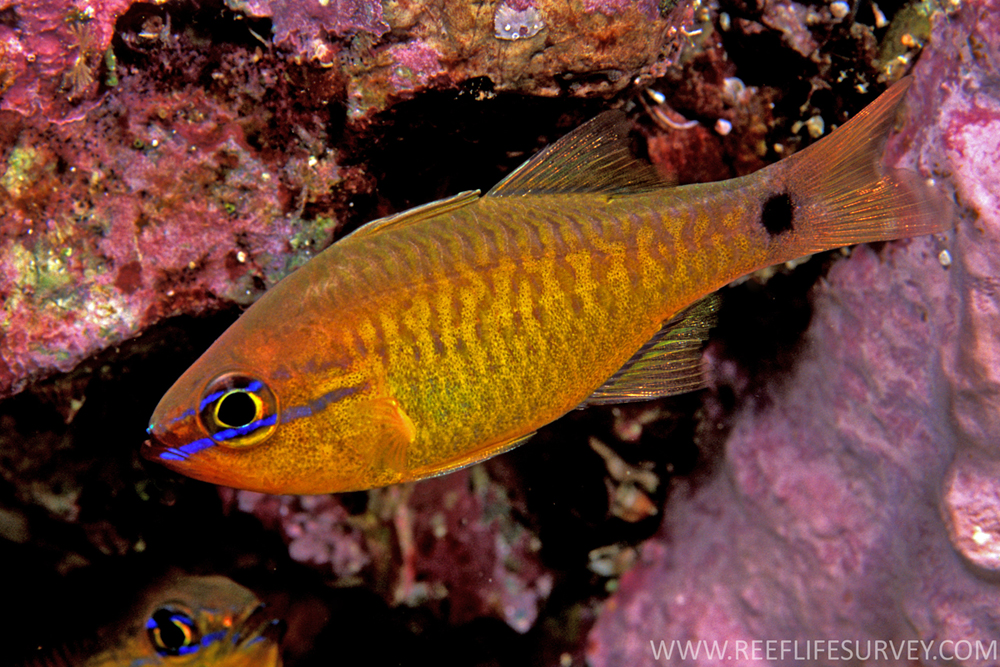

Scientific classification
- Kingdom: Animalia
- Phylum: Chordata
- Class: Actinopterygii
- Order: Gobiiformes
- Family: Apogonidae
- Genus: Ostorhinchus
- Species: O. capricornis

Binomial name
- Ostorhinchus capricornis (Allen & Randall, 1993)

Synonyms
- Apogon capricornis Allen & Randall, 1993

= Ostorhinchus capricornis =

Species of fish

Ostorhinchus capricornis, also known as the Capricorn cardinalfish, is a species of ray-finned fish, a cardinalfish from the family Apogonidae which occurs around reefs in the western Pacific Ocean.

== Description ==
Ostorhinchus capricornis is dusky yellow in colour, this lightens to bronze or golden yellow on the ventral surface. It has a black spot around the caudal peduncle and it has two "neon" blue stripes which run through the eye, the lower stripe extending to the posterior edge of the operculum. It grows to a maximum standard length of 5.8 centimetres (2.3 in). It is similar to the yellow cardinalfish (Ostorhinchus flavus) but that species has white stripe through the eye rather than the neon blue stripes of O. capricornis.

== Distribution ==
Ostorhinchus capricornis is named after the Capricorn Group of islands in southern Great Barrier Reef, Queensland, where most of the specimens have been collected. It also occurs on reefs in the southern Coral Sea, at least as far south as Sydney in New South Wales and with juveniles have been recorded as far south as Montague Island. They are also found around Lord Howe Island and Norfolk Island in the Tasman Sea and in the tropical, south-west Pacific around the Chesterfield Islands, Coral Sea, and New Caledonia.

== Habitat and biology ==
Ostorhinchus capricornis is associated with reefs at depths of 2–15 metres (6.6–49.2 ft) and they normally spend the day sheltering in caves and crevices. Small groups emerge from their daytime shelters at dusk and they feed on benthic invertebrates and zooplankton. They form pairs which demonstrate courtship behaviours before spawning and the male then broods the eggs in his mouth.
