= Ostorhinchus flavus =

Conservation status
- Least Concern (IUCN 3.1)

Scientific classification
- Kingdom: Animalia
- Phylum: Chordata
- Class: Actinopterygii
- Division: Teleostei
- Order: Gobiiformes
- Family: Apogonidae
- Genus: Ostorhinchus
- Species: O. flavus

Binomial name
- Ostorhinchus flavus (G. R. Allen & Randall, 1993)

Synonyms{
- Apogon flavus Allen & Randall, 1993

Species of fish

Ostorhinchus flavus, the brassy cardinalfish or yellow cardinalfish, is a species of marine ray-finned fish belonging to the family Apogonidae, the cardinalfishes. This cardinalfish is found in the Southwest Pacific Ocean.

== Taxonomy ==
Ostorhinchus flavus was first formally described as Apogon flavus in 1993 by the ichthyologists Gerald R. Allen and John Ernest Randall with its type locality given as the west side of Nepean Island, Norfolk Island, about 29°05'S, 167°59'E, from a depth of 15–20 m (49–66 ft). This species is now classified in the genus Ostorhinchus, which was described in 1802 by Bernard Germain de Lacépède as a monospecific genus with Ostorhinchus fleurieu its type species by monotypy. This genus is the only one in the tribe Ostorhinchini within the subfamily Apogoninae. The family Apogonidae is in the suborder Apogonoidei in the order Gobiiformes.

== Etymology ==
Ostorhinchus flavus is classified in the genus Ostorhinchus, this name means "bony snout" and refers to the bony, jagged edges of the jaws of O. fleurieu which are used like teeth. The specific name flavus, means "yellow", an allusion to the yellow colour of most of the body.

== Description ==
Ostorhinchus flavus reaches a standard length of 9.6 cm (3.8 in). The first dorsal fin contains 7 spines, the second dorsal fin has a single spine and 8 soft rays and the anal fin has 2 spines and 8 or 9 soft rays. The overall colour of the body is bright yellowish-orange with a black spot on the caudal peduncle, two white stripes through eye and a brown stripe to the front of the eye. The juveniles have the black spot but they are paler with a broad brownish stripe.

== Distribution and habitat ==
Ostorhinchus flavus is found in the southwestern Pacific Ocean where it occurs in the southern Great Barrier Reef in Australia, the Elizabeth and Middleton Reef in the Coral Sea, Lord Howe Island and Norfolk Island, in the Tasman Sea, and New Caledonia. This species is found at depths between 2 and 25 m (6 ft 7 in and 82 ft 0 in) on rocky and coral reefs.
