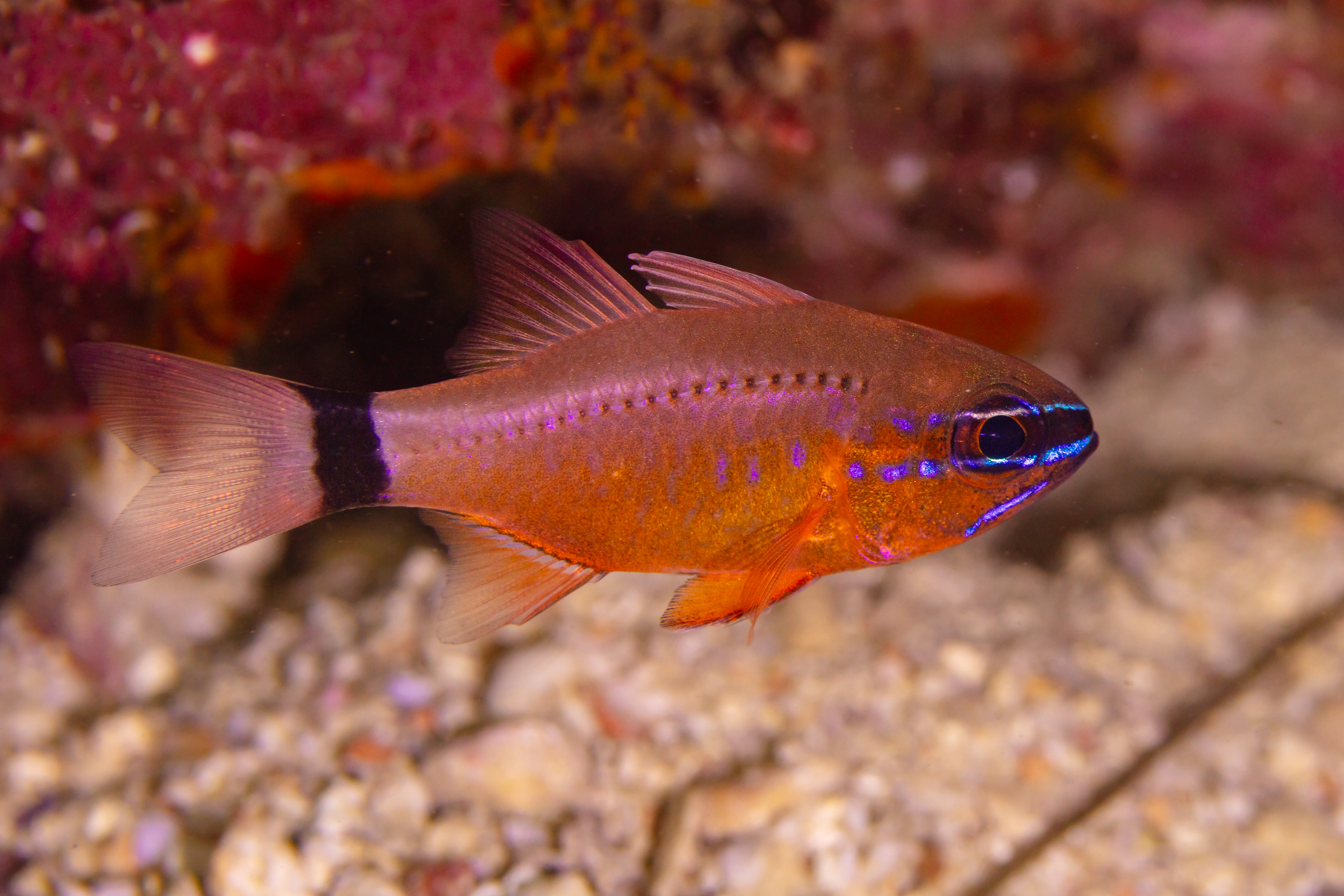

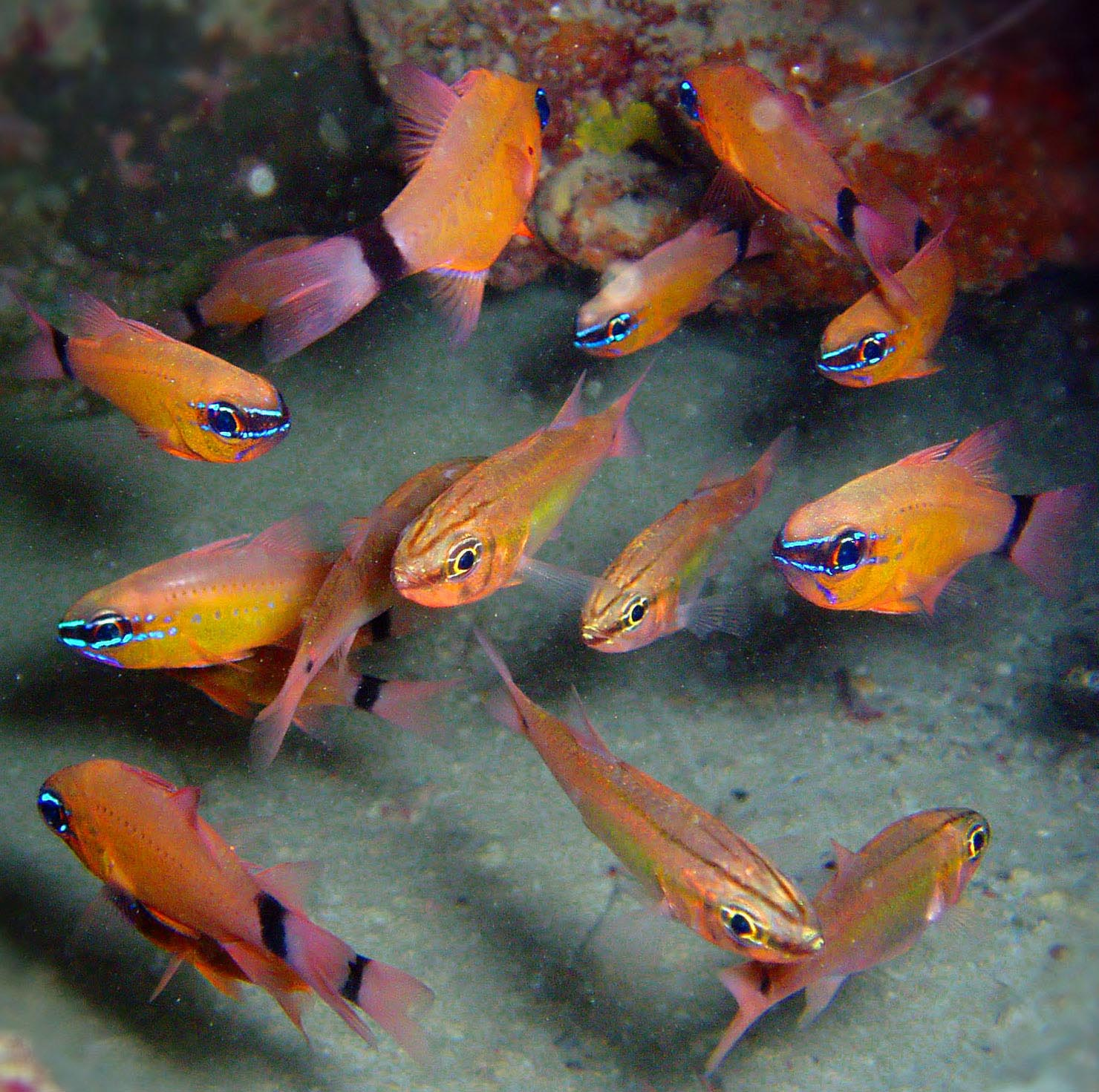
- A group of Ostorhinchus aureus with other cardinalfishes.

Conservation status
- Least Concern (IUCN 3.1)

Scientific classification
- Kingdom: Animalia
- Phylum: Chordata
- Class: Actinopterygii
- Division: Teleostei
- Order: Gobiiformes
- Family: Apogonidae
- Genus: Ostorhinchus
- Species: O. aureus

Binomial name
- Ostorhinchus aureus (Lacépède - ex Commerson, 1802)

Synonyms
- Centropomus aureus Lacepède, 1802; Amia aurea (Lacepède, 1802); Apogon aureus (Lacepède, 1802); Gronovichthys aureus (Lacepède, 1802); Apogon roseipinnis Cuvier, 1829

= Ring-tailed cardinalfish =

Species of fish

The ring-tailed cardinalfish (Ostorhinchus aureus) is a widespread fish species in the family Apogonidae found in the Red Sea and off East Africa to Papua New Guinea, north to Japan, and south to Australia.

== Taxonomy ==
Cladogram

- - - - O. semilineatus
      - O. gularis
    - - O. apogonoides
      - - O. aureus
        - O. flagelliferus

Selected genetic neighbours

The French naturalist Philibert Commerson provided the first description of this fish from Réunion in the western Indian Ocean, but it was not published in a format allowing full citation. Therefore, the species name and description by Bernard Germain de Lacépède (who acknowledged Commerson) takes precedence, albeit with a nod to Commerson. With no original or subsequent illustrations or specimens denoted as types, Fricke nominated a neotype in 1999 but subsequently withdrew it.

=== Etymology ===
This species has on occasion been mistakenly considered a junior synonym of the similar species Ostorhinchus fleurieu, but is generally acknowledged as separate; it had the junior species synonym roseipinnis applied by Georges Cuvier in 1829.

Lacépède coined the genus Ostorhinchus in 1802 to which O. aureus was eventually assigned, although he originally placed it in the genus Centropomus which is now placed in a different fish family, Centropomidae.

== Description ==
This fish is coppery-coloured with a broad blackish bar at the base of the tail, up to 14.5 cm (5.7 in) in length. The upper jaw has a narrow blue streak, and a broad blackish stripe extends from the front of the snout to the eye. Easily confused with Ostorhinchus fleurieu, where the black tail bar does not narrow in the centre, but unlike this species, the stripe is also present in juveniles.

Internally, O. aureus is one of a large group of nocturnal feeding fishes which has a black pigmented gut lining, apparently to hide the glow of bioluminescent prey from its own piscivores in turn. The eyes of O. aureus allow the transmission of ultraviolet light, which if it is proven to be able to see, could benefit its nocturnal foraging.

=== Meristics ===
Using a shorthand meristics formula, O. aureus can be described as having:

D, VII-I,9

A, II,8

P, 14

LL, 25

GR, 6-8 + 16-20

== Habitat ==
Ostorhinchus aureus inhabits holes in rocks or under ledges in shallow waters. It is known to occur in mixed aggregates with Ostorhinchus apogonoides during summer and autumn, but form separate aggregates in winter and spring.

=== Settlement ===
Whereas coral reef fish settlement tends to be dominated by larval recruitment, in at least part of Australia's Great Barrier Reef, recruitment of O. aureus at any given coral reef patch tends to be by adult and juvenile migration across intervening sand and coral debris.

=== Parasites ===
O. aureus is subject to infection by tiny cnidarian parasites from class Myxosporea. Fish specimens have been found with gall bladder infections of Ceratomyxa apogoni, Ceratomyxa cardinalis, and Ellipsomyxa apogoni. Three species have also been found in skeletal muscle cells: Kudoa cheilodipteri, Kudoa whippsi, and Kudoa iwatai.

== Behaviour ==
O. aureus is a nocturnal predator; where seagrass is adjacent to its reef, it tends to venture out further than some other members of its family.

=== Diet ===
Studies of stomach content show that O. aureus is a generalist predator, eating mainly planktonic and benthic crustaceans, but, unusually for its family, may at times also eat marine algae.

=== Reproduction ===
O. aureus are external bearers, specifically mouthbrooders. Adults tend to pair whilst juveniles tend to aggregate during the day time.

== Importance to humans ==
=== Aquariums ===
O. aureus is regularly kept by marine aquarists.

Personal Aquariums

List of aspects that one should be aware of about having ring-tailed cardinalfish as a personal pet:

– This species needs hiding places.

– This species can live with many of its own kind, when provided with enough space.

– This species is nocturnal and therefore the most active when the light is dimmed or turned off.

– This species might be a threat to smaller fishes, shrimps, crabs, etc.
