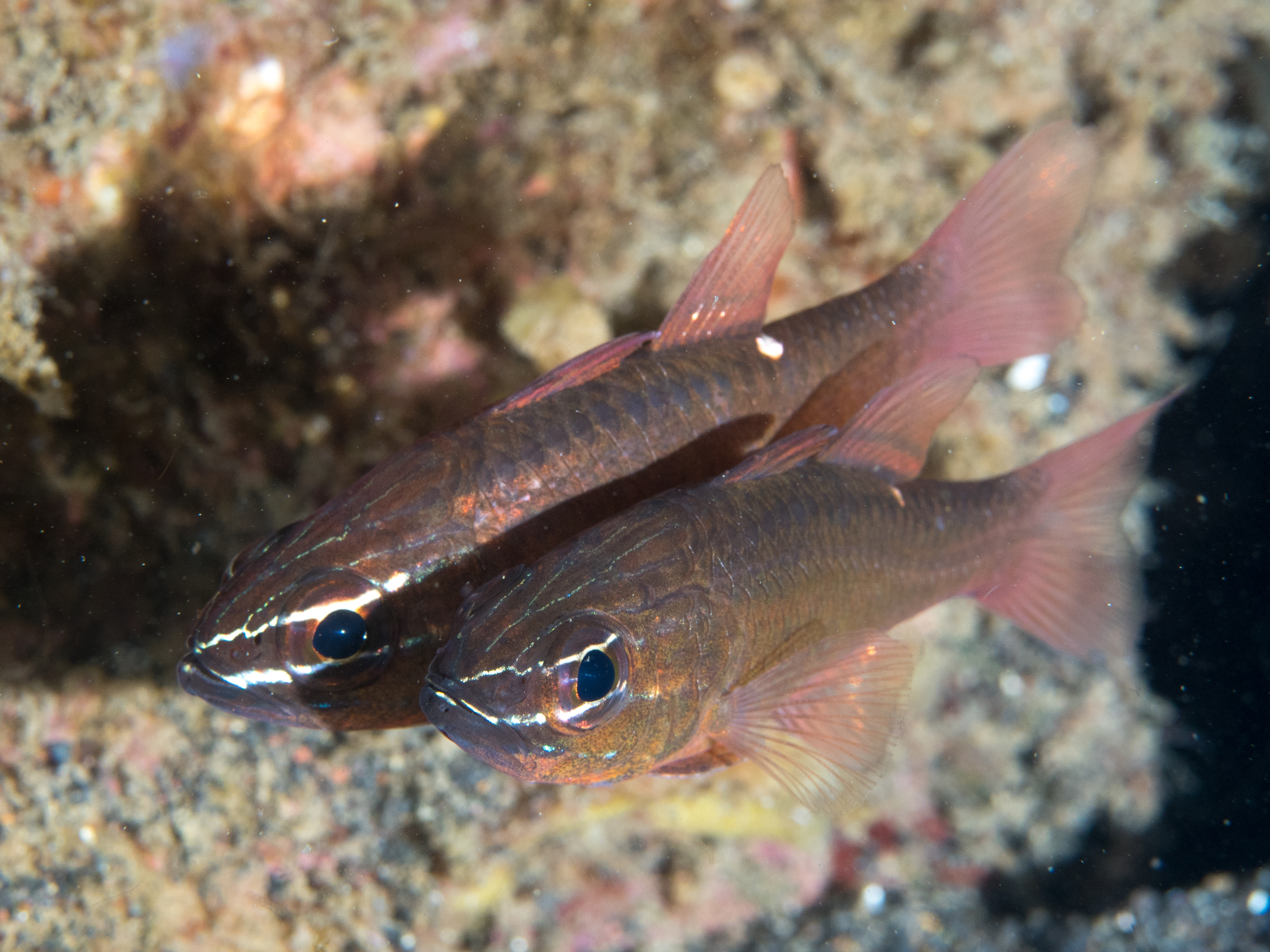

Conservation status
- Least Concern (IUCN 3.1)

Scientific classification
- Kingdom: Animalia
- Phylum: Chordata
- Class: Actinopterygii
- Division: Teleostei
- Order: Gobiiformes
- Family: Apogonidae
- Genus: Ostorhinchus
- Species: O. moluccensis

Binomial name
- Ostorhinchus moluccensis (Valenciennes, 1832)

Synonyms
- Apogon moluccensis Valenciennes, 1832; Apogon chrysosoma Bleeker, 1852; Apogon monochrous Bleeker, 1856; Apogon ventrifasciatus Allen, Kuiter & Randall, 1994

= Ostorhinchus moluccensis =

Species of fish

Ostorhinchus moluccensis, the Moluccan cardinalfish or yelloweye cardinalfish, is a species of marine ray-finned fish belonging to the family Apogonidae, the cardinalfishes. This cardinalfish is found in the eastern Indian and western Pacific Oceans.

== Taxonomy ==
Ostorhinchus moluccensis was first formally described as Apogon moluccensis in 1832 by the French zoologist Achille Valenciennes with its type locality given as Ambon Island, Molucca Islands, Indonesia. This species is now classified in the genus Ostorhinchus, which was described in 1802 by Bernard Germain de Lacépède as a monospecific genus with Ostorhinchus fleurieu its type species by monotypy. This genus is the only one in the tribe Ostorhinchini within the subfamily Apogoninae. The family Apogonidae is in the suborder Apogonoidei in the order Gobiiformes.

== Etymology ==
Ostorhinchus moluccensis is classified in the genus Ostorhinchus, this name means "bony snout" and refers to the bony, jagged edges of the jaws of O. fleurieu which are used like teeth. The specific name, moluccensis, means of the Moluccas.

== Description ==
Ostorhinchus moluccensis has 6 spines in the first dorsal fin and 2 spines and 9 soft rays in its second dorsal fin, while the anal fin has 2 spines and 8 soft rays. The overall colour of the body is reddish brown with two blue stripes on the face. There is a white spot to the rear of the second dorsal fin. The Moluccan cardinalfish has a short, deep body with a compressed cross section and it reaches a maximum total length of 9 cm (3.5 in).

== Distribution and habitat ==
Ostorhinchus moluccensis is found on the eastern Indian Ocean and western Pacific Ocean. It is found from the Andaman and Nicobar Islands, Myanmar and Thailand east to the Solomon Islands and New Caledonia, north to the Philippines, Taiwan and the Yaeyama Islands of Japan. The Moluccan cardinalfish is found at depths between 1 and 35 m (3 ft 3 in and 114 ft 10 in) in estuaries, sheltered lagoons and coastal reefs.

== Behaviours ==
Ostorhinchus moluccensis often associates with sea anemones, it frequently forms schools. The males are mouthbrooders.
