= Ostorhinchus compressus =

Conservation status
- Least Concern (IUCN 3.1)

Scientific classification
- Kingdom: Animalia
- Phylum: Chordata
- Class: Actinopterygii
- Division: Teleostei
- Order: Gobiiformes
- Family: Apogonidae
- Genus: Ostorhinchus
- Species: O. compressus

Binomial name
- Ostorhinchus compressus (H. M. Smith & Radcliffe, 1911)

Synonyms
- Amia compressa Smith & Radcliffe, 1911; Apogon compressus (Smith & Radcliffe, 1911); Apogonichthys macrophthalmus Bleeker, 1860

Species of fish

Ostorhinchus compressus, commonly called the ochre-striped cardinalfish, blue-eyed cardinalfish or split banded cardinalfish, is a marine cardinalfish from the Indo-West Pacific from the family Apogonidae. It occasionally makes its way into the aquarium trade. It grows to a size of 12 cm in length.

== Taxonomy ==
This fish was first described by Hugh McCormick Smith and Lewis Radcliffe after its collection during the 1907-1910 United States Bureau of Fisheries Albatross Philippines expedition. The holotype (record number USNM 68398) is lodged at the Smithsonian in Washington, D.C.

=== Etymology ===
The genus Amia initially allocated by the authors subsequently proved to be a synonym of Ostorhinchus, making its way via Apogon.

== Description ==
Although the maximum recorded standard length of O. compressus is 12 cm, its most common adult length is around 8.5 cm. Adults are pinkish-white, with six brown stripes along each side, iridescent blue eye rings, and up to four brown spots on the caudal peduncle (tail base). Juveniles begin with a black spot on a yellow caudal peduncle, which appears to mimic juveniles of certain piscivorous species of Cheilodipterus.

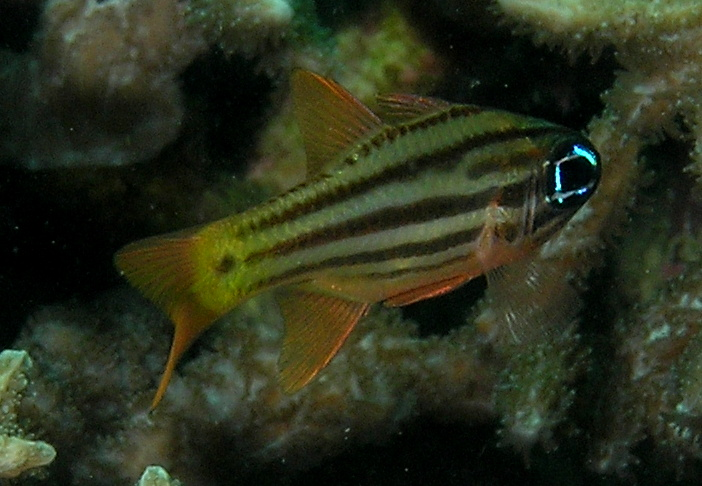
Sub-adult

=== Meristics ===
Using a shorthand meristics formula, O. compressus can be described as having:

D, VI-I,9

A II,9

P, 13-14

LL, 24

GR, 7-8 + 20-22

== Distribution and habitat ==
=== Range ===
Ostorhinchus compressus occurs in Australian waters from the Scott Reef, Ashmore and Cartier Islands, and Rowley Shoals in Western Australia; and from the Great Barrier Reef to the Middleton & Elizabeth Reefs Reserve and Lord Howe Island in the Tasman Sea. Its wider distribution extends through the Indo-Pacific from the Andaman Sea to Vanuatu and New Caledonia and as far north as southern Japan.

=== Ontology ===
Research on the larval stage of this species shows that as it develops, its ability to see in ultraviolet light increases. Given that the larval stage is pelagic, this implies that older larvae can migrate down the water column to feed. This might improve its predator evasion, whilst improving its food intake.

=== Settlement ===
Generally found from 2–20 metres, adults rest during the daytime in floating mixed species groups with other Apogonids. They are not very picky, being found resting in association with several kinds of live hard coral, Gorgonians, dead coral, rubble, and sand. Possibly because of the low water circulation, higher temperatures, and high oxygen consumption of some of the shallow branching corals into which O. compressus retreats from predators, it has been found to tolerate very low dissolved levels of oxygen, even at a temperature of 30 °C (which is likely to stimulate a relatively high resting metabolic rate).

=== Parasites ===
The gills of O. compressus have been found infected with Gyrodactylid flatworms.
