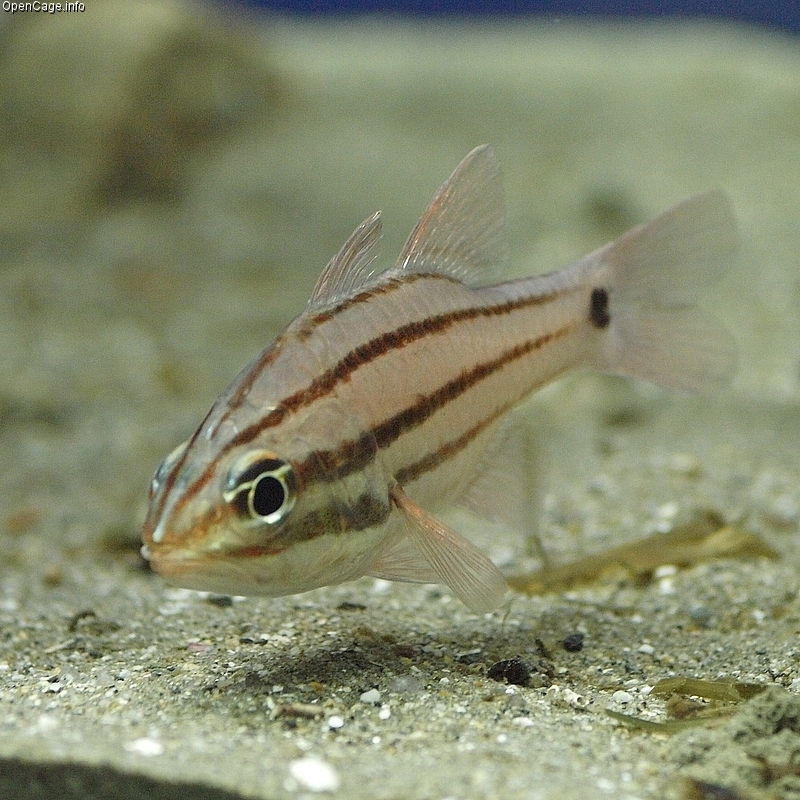

Scientific classification
- Kingdom: Animalia
- Phylum: Chordata
- Class: Actinopterygii
- Order: Gobiiformes
- Family: Apogonidae
- Genus: Ostorhinchus
- Species: O. doederleini

Binomial name
- Ostorhinchus doederleini Jordan & Snyder, 1901

Synonyms
- Apogon doederleini Jordan & Snyder, 1901

= Ostorhinchus doederleini =

Species of fish

Ostorhinchus doederleini is a species of fish in the cardinalfish family, also known by the common names Doederlein's cardinalfish and fourline cardinalfish. In Japanese it is called osuji-ishimochi. It is native to subtropical regions of the western Pacific Ocean, its distribution extending from Japan to Taiwan and Australia to New Caledonia and the Kermadec Islands.

This species reaches about 14 centimeters long. The male and female look alike. The body is pinkish or brownish with four brown lines reaching nearly from head to tail. There is a black spot at the base of the tail. The fish grows until it reaches 3 years of age, and it lives to a maximum age of about 7 years.

This fish lives in rocky habitat types near the shore, such as ledges. It is nocturnal. During the day it hides in caves and rock crevices. It feeds on invertebrates, especially gammarid amphipods.

It is solitary until the breeding season, when it forms pairs. The pairings are short-lived, with male and female courting for a few hours during the afternoon for a few days in a row. During these visits the pair performs a "parallel-circling" behavior, in which they circle each other with the female pointing towards the male's side and occasionally poking him with her nose. As they court, both fish change color, becoming paler, especially in their dark markings. The female may chase away other fish that come near. After a few episodes of circling the female releases a mass of eggs about 2 to 3 centimeters wide.

Like other members of its family, this species is a paternal mouthbrooder, the male tending the eggs by storing them in his mouth. Within seconds of the female's spawning, the male scoops the egg mass into his mouth. The female departs and the male is solitary while brooding. He may incubate several broods during one breeding season, which is a few months long, depending on location. One mass contains about 10,000 eggs. One brood is incubated for 5 to 17 days. The length of time depends on water temperature.

A larger male will generally incubate more eggs at a time. Also, males' mouths get larger during the breeding season, expanding significantly. The lower jaw becomes more depressed in shape.

The male quite often eats his eggs. In one study, 361 egg masses were brooded by males, and they had eaten 47 of them within one day. Other studies saw the overall cannibalism rate at 12 to 18%. When a male is mouthbrooding, he does not eat any normal food. As the end of the breeding season nears, after he has reared several broods, he has weakened physically. At this time it is more likely that he will eat the eggs. Younger males, though, often eat the first eggs of the season, possibly because they are still growing and can benefit more from the nutrition than from bearing offspring. Sometimes a male will only swallow a few of the eggs, perhaps to make his mouth less crowded or improve oxygenation for the remaining ones. A male is also more likely to eat eggs spawned by a smaller female than a larger one. Afterwards, he will quickly pair with a different female, suggesting that he chooses which mate to invest in.

This fish is host to the parasitic chondracanthid copepod Pseudacanthocanthopsis apogonis.

The specific name honours the German zoologist Ludwig Döderlein (1855-1936) who had been connected to the Imperial University at Tokyo in recognition of his work on the fishes of Japan.
