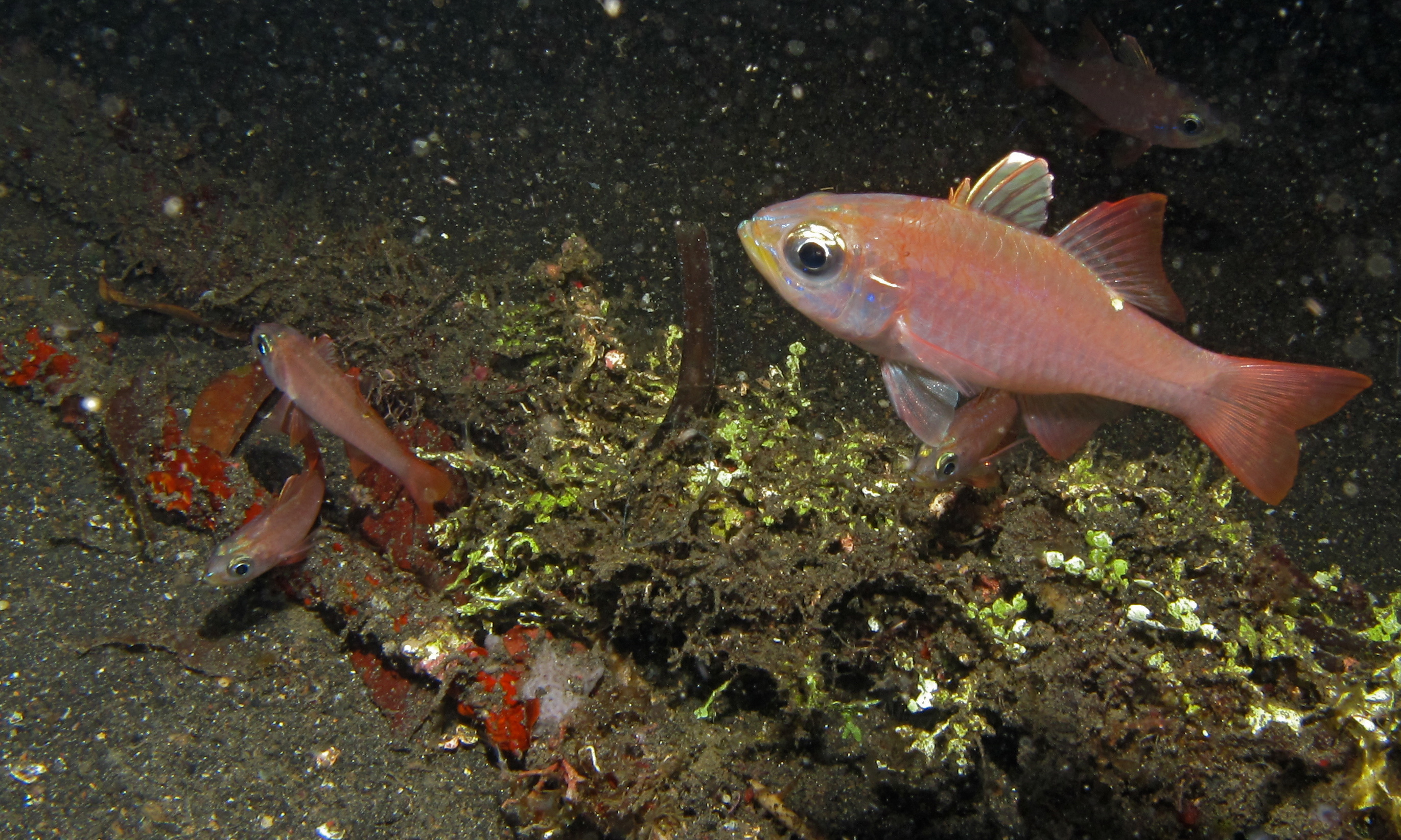
- Ostorhinchus monospilus
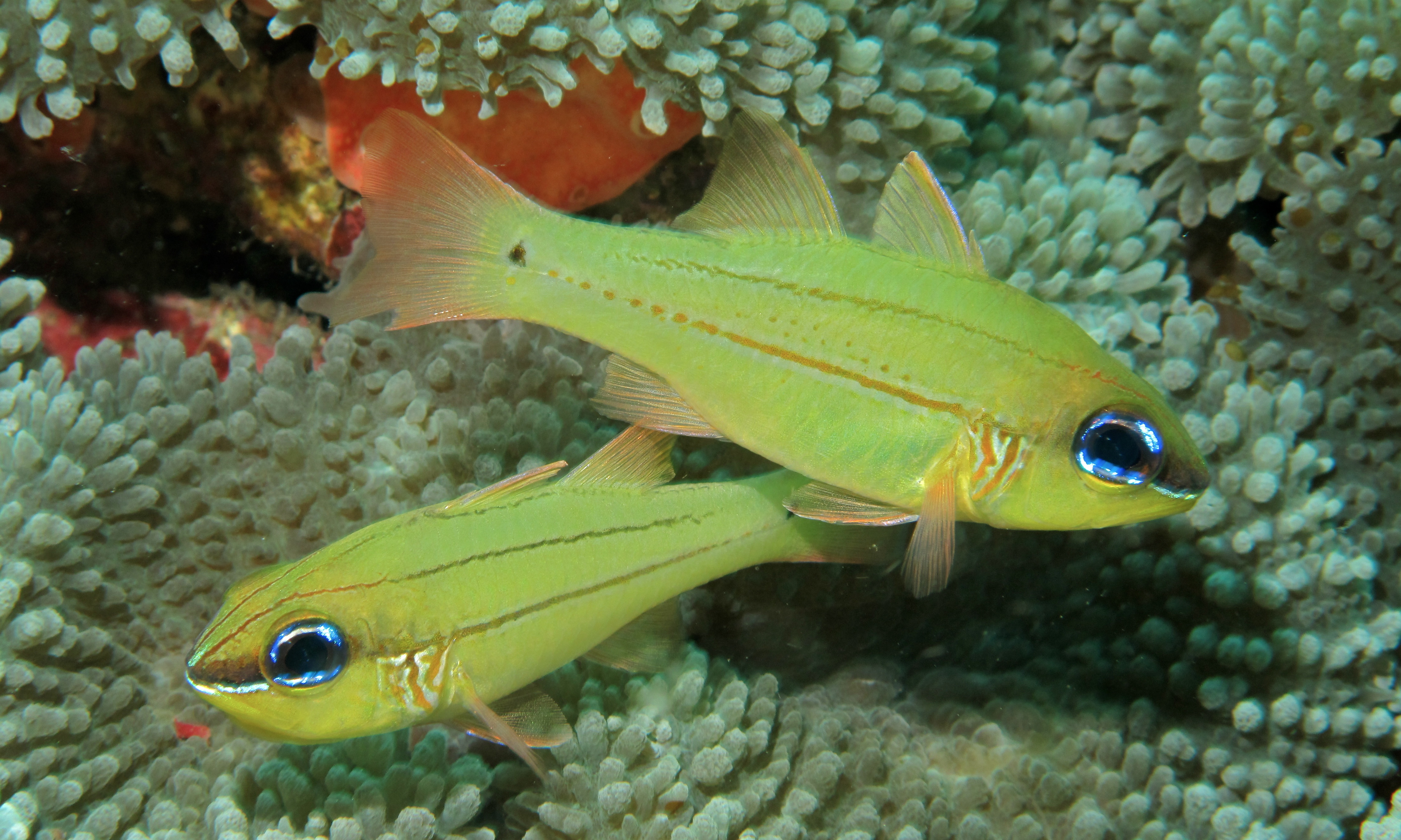
- Ostorhinchus sealei

Scientific classification
- Kingdom: Animalia
- Phylum: Chordata
- Class: Actinopterygii
- Division: Teleostei
- Order: Gobiiformes
- Family: Apogonidae
- Subfamily: Apogoninae
- Genus: Ostorhinchus; Lacépède, 1802

Type species
- Ostorhinchus fleurieu Lacépède, 1802

Synonyms
- Lovamia Whitley, 1930

= Ostorhinchus =

Genus of fishes

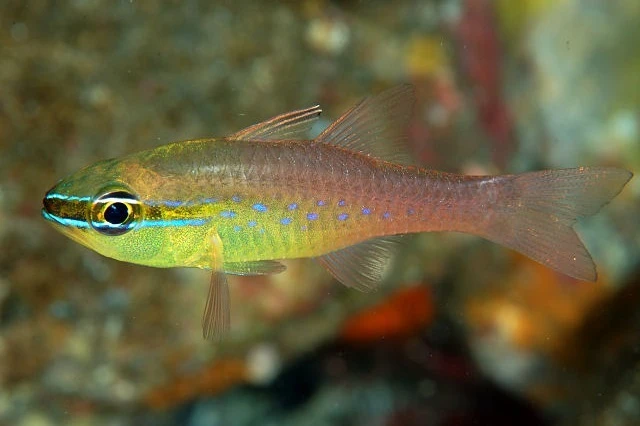
O. apogonoides

Ostorhinchus is a genus of ray-finned fish in the family Apogonidae native to the Indian and Pacific Oceans.

== Etymology ==
The etymology of the word Ostorhinchus is Greek, with Ostor- stemming from ὀστέον (bone), and -rhinchus stemming from ῥῠ́γχος (Ancient Greek) or ρύγχος (Modern Greek), the meaning of which can be beak. The latter refers to the genus' advanced boned jaw.

== Species ==
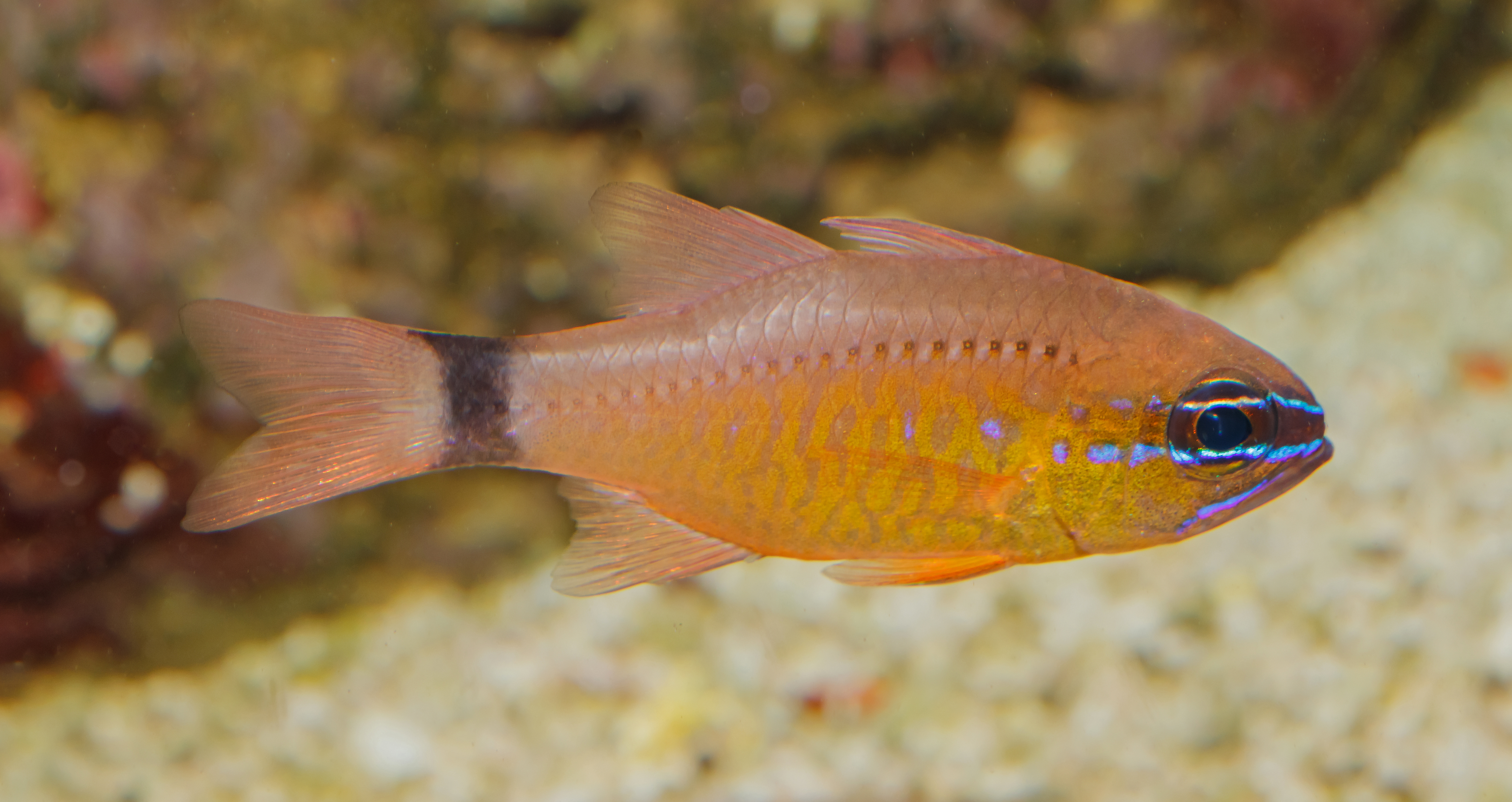
O. aureus

The 89 recognized species in this genus are:

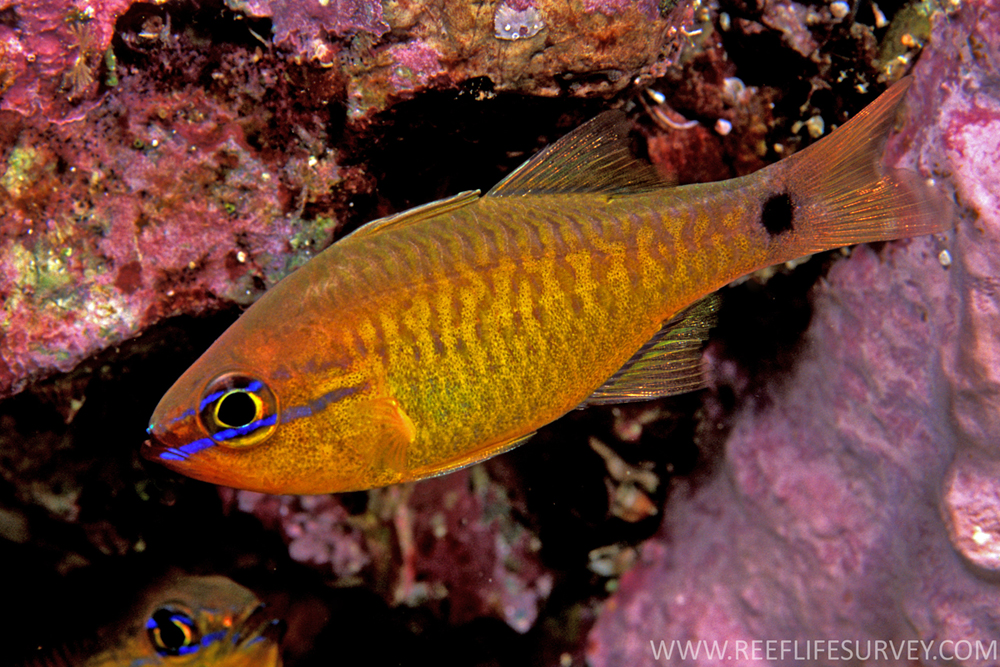
- O. capricornis
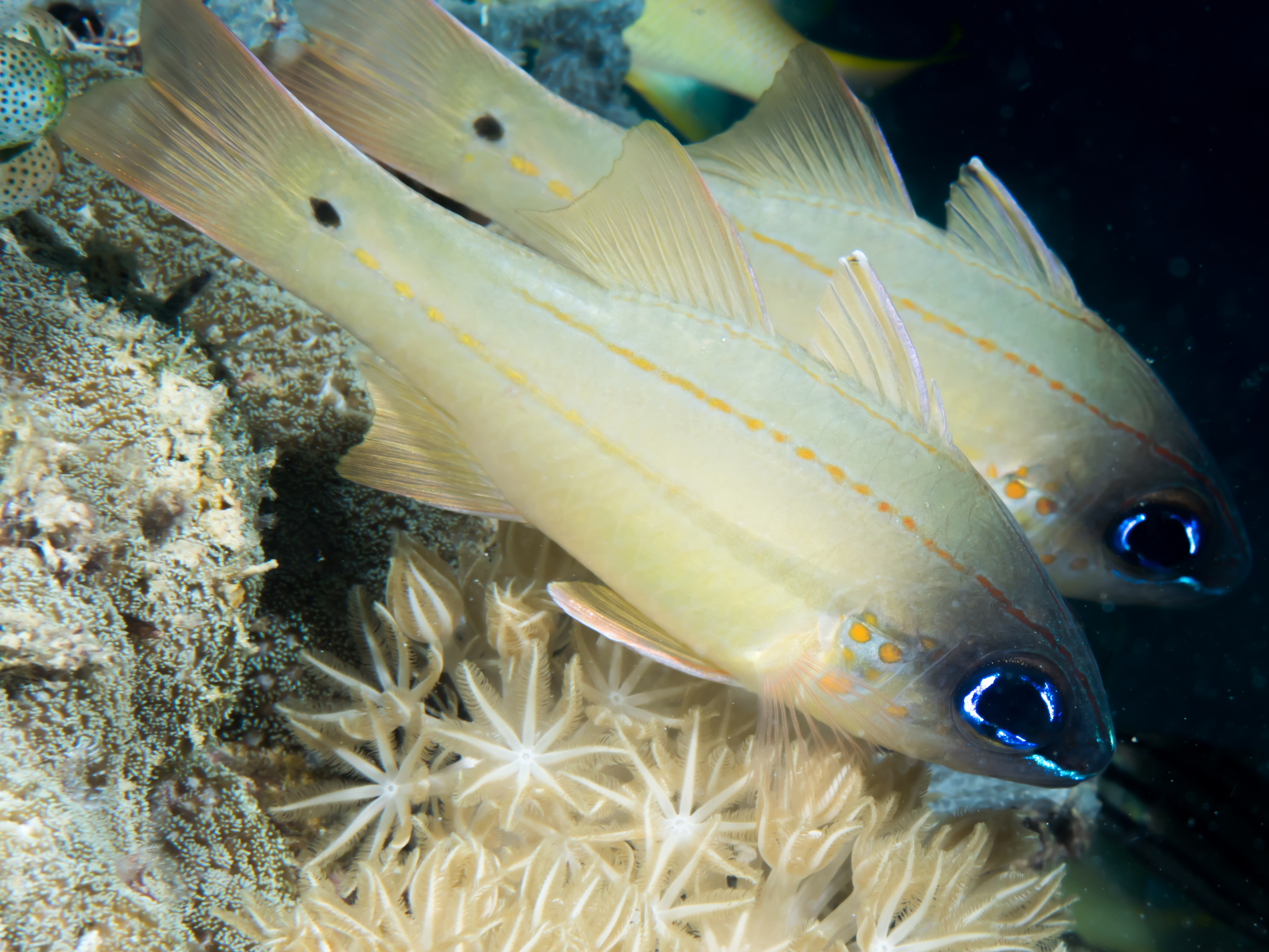
  O. chrysopomus
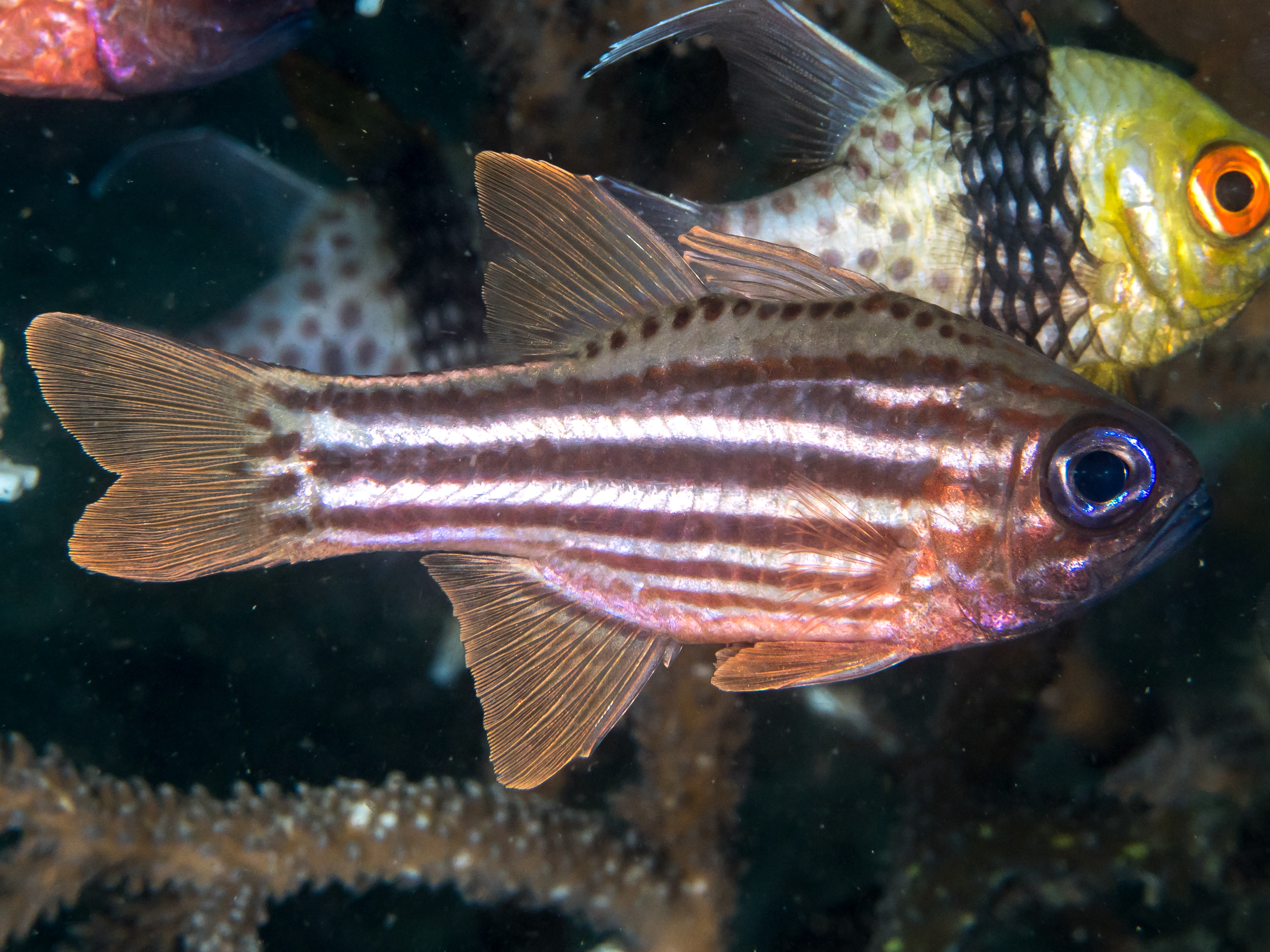
  O. compressus (foreground), pajama cardinalfish (background)
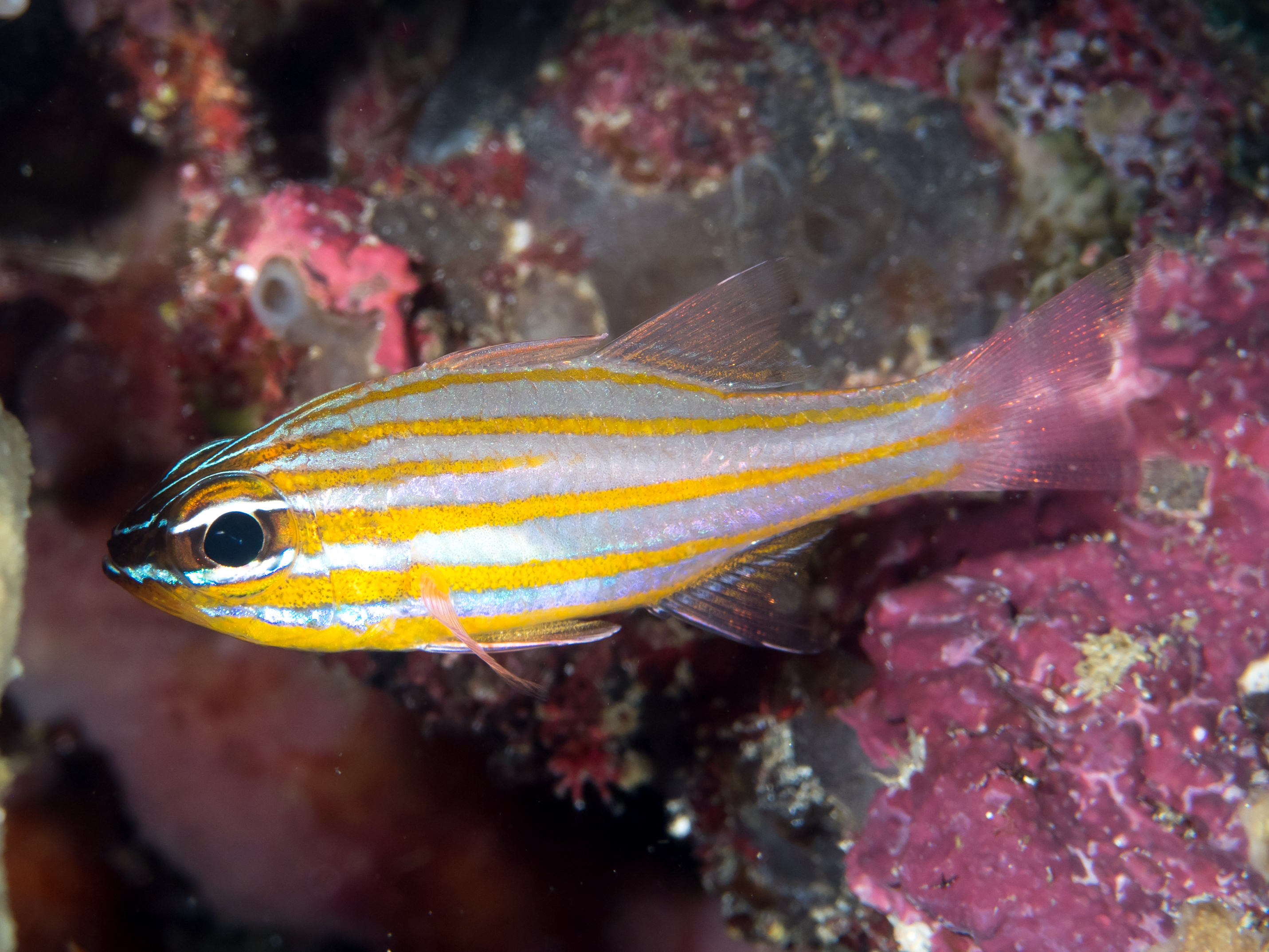
  O. cyanosoma
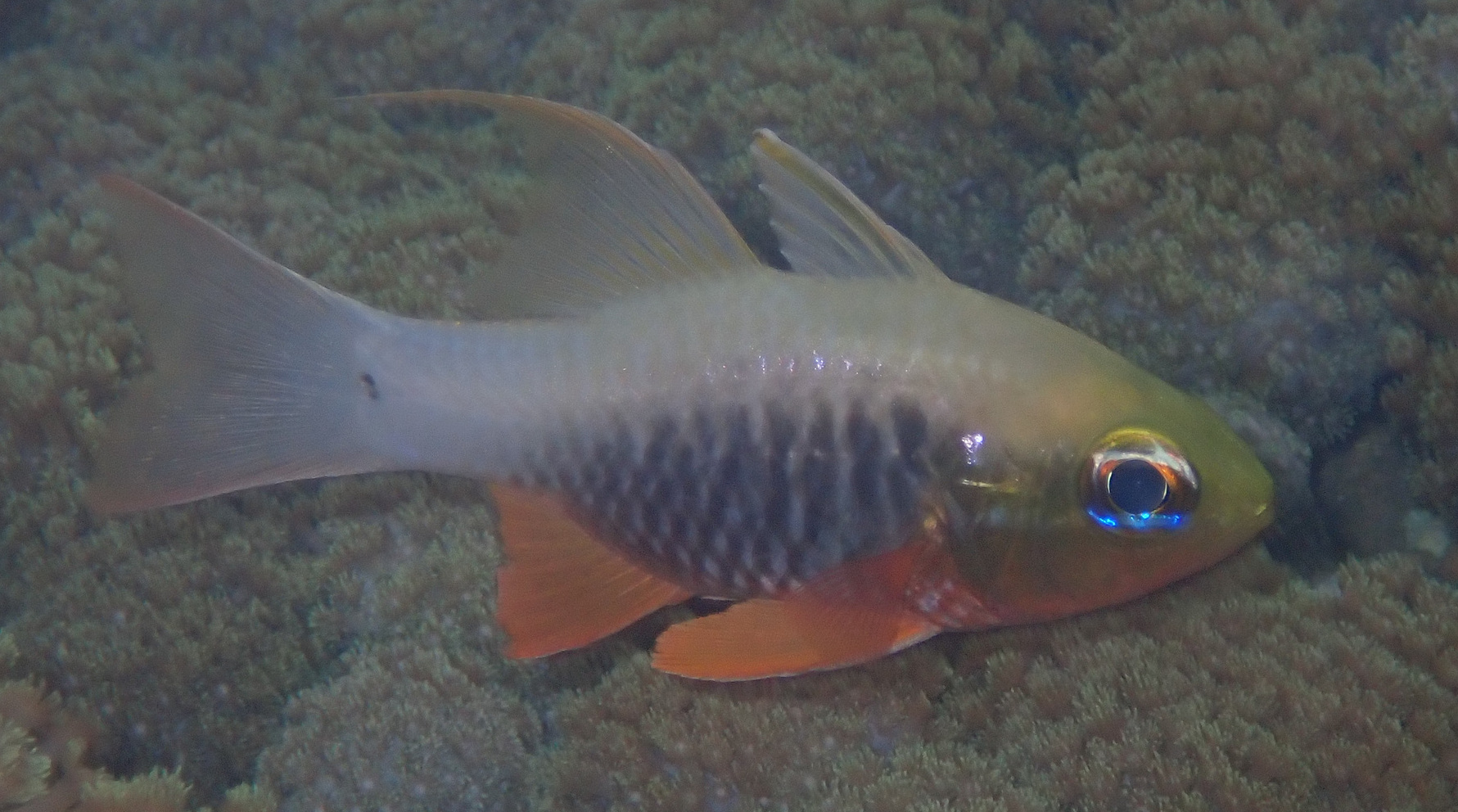
  O. griffini
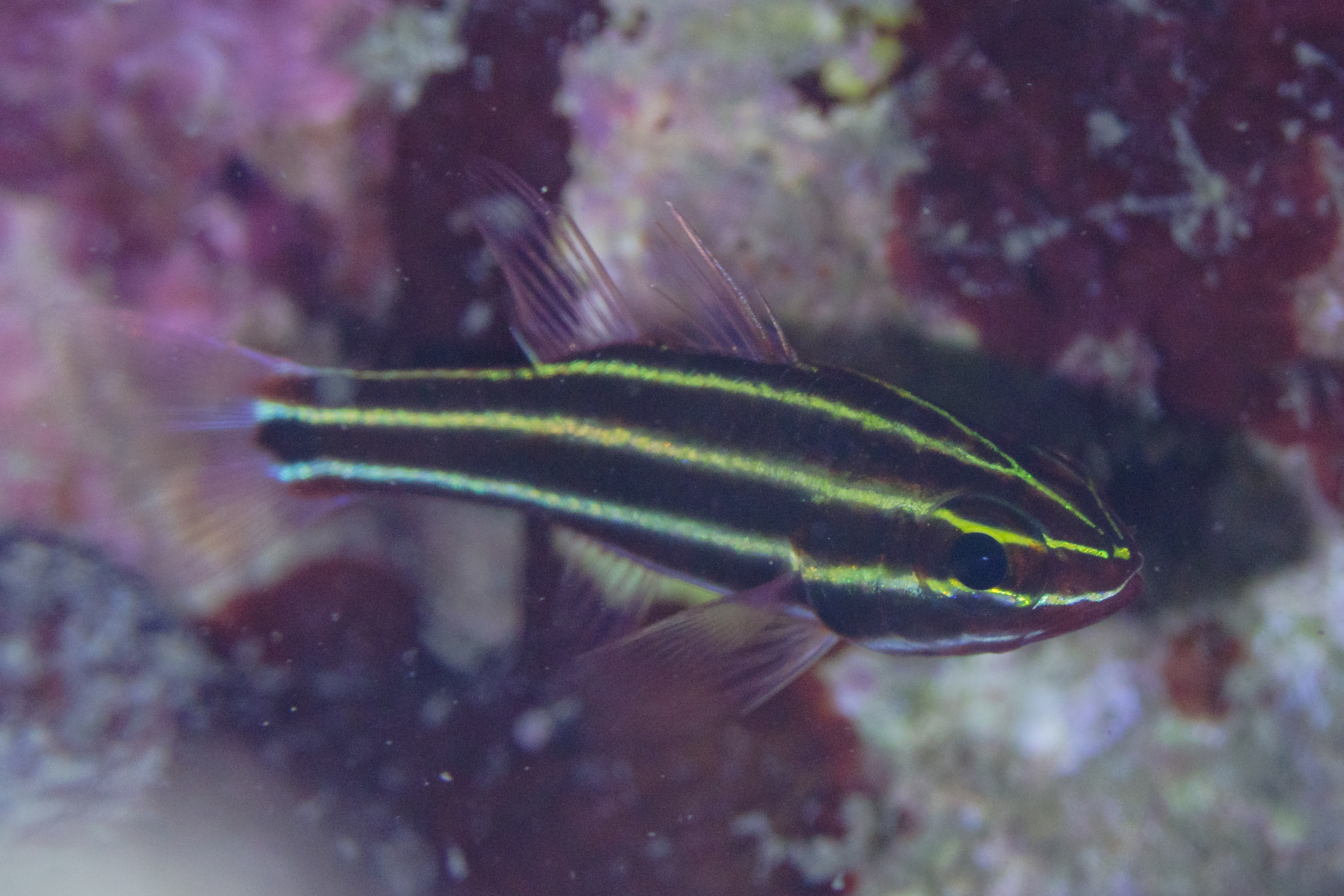
  O. nigrofasciatus
  O. angustatus (H. M. Smith & Radcliffe, 1911), broad-striped cardinalfish
- O. aphanes (T. H. Fraser, 2012)
- O. apogonoides (Bleeker, 1856), short-tooth cardinalfish or goldbelly cardinalfish
- O. aroubiensis (Hombron & Jacquinot, 1853)
- O. aterrimus (Günther, 1867)
- O. atrogaster (H. M. Smith & Radcliffe, 1912), black-belly cardinalfish
- O. aureus (Lacépède, 1802), ring-tailed cardinalfish
- O. brevispinis (T. H. Fraser & J. E. Randall, 2003)
- O. bryx (T. H. Fraser, 1998), offshore cardinalfish
- O. capricornis (G. R. Allen & J. E. Randall, 1993), Capricorn cardinalfish
- O. cavitensis (D. S. Jordan & Seale, 1907), white-line cardinalfish
- O. chalcius (T. H. Fraser & J. E. Randall, 1986)
- O. cheni (Hayashi, 1990), Munahosi cardinalfish
- O. chrysopomus (Bleeker, 1854), spotted-gill cardinalfish
- O. chrysotaenia (Bleeker, 1851), yellow-lined cardinalfish
- O. cladophilos (G. R. Allen & J. E. Randall, 2002), shelter cardinalfish
- O. compressus (H. M. Smith & Radcliffe, 1911), ochre-striped cardinalfish
- O. cookii (W. J. Macleay, 1881), Cook's cardinalfish
- O. cyanosoma (Bleeker, 1853), yellow-striped cardinalfish
- O. cyanotaenia (Bleeker, 1853)
- O. dispar (T. H. Fraser & J. E. Randall, 1976), red-spot cardinalfish
- O. diversus (H. M. Smith & Radcliffe, 1912)
- O. doederleini (D. S. Jordan & Snyder, 1901), Doederlein's cardinalfish
- O. elizabethae (Jordan & Seale, 1905)
- O. endekataenia (Bleeker, 1852), candy-stripe cardinalfish
- O. fasciatus (G. Shaw, 1790), broad-banded cardinalfish
- O. flagelliferus (J. L. B. Smith, 1961), coachwhip cardinalfish
- O. flavus (G. R. Allen & J. E. Randall, 1993), brassy cardinalfish
- O. fleurieu Lacépède, 1802, flower cardinalfish
- O. franssedai (G. R. Allen, Kuiter & J. E. Randall, 1994), Frans' cardinalfish
- O. fukuii (Hayashi, 1990)
- O. griffini (Seale, 1910), hook-fin cardinalfish
- O. gularis (T. H. Fraser & Lachner, 1984), gular cardinalfish
- O. hartzfeldii (Bleeker, 1852), Hartzfeld's cardinalfish
- O. hoevenii (Bleeker, 1854), frost-fin cardinalfish
- O. holotaenia (Regan, 1905), copper-striped cardinalfish
- O. ishigakiensis (H. Ida & Moyer, 1974)
- O. jenkinsi (Evermann & Seale, 1907), Spot-nape cardinalfish
- O. kiensis (D. S. Jordan & Snyder, 1901), rifle cardinalfish
- O. komodoensis (G. R. Allen, 1998), komodo cardinalfish
- O. leptofasciatus (G. R. Allen, 2001), slender-line cardinalfish
- O. leslie (J. K. Schultz & J. E. Randall, 2006), Leslie's cardinalfish
- O. limenus (J. E. Randall & Hoese, 1988), Sydney cardinalfish
- O. lineomaculatus (G. R. Allen & J. E. Randall, 2002), line-spot cardinalfish
- O. luteus (J. E. Randall & Kulbicki, 1998) (yellow cardinalfish)
- O. maculiferus (A. Garrett, 1864) (spotted cardinalfish)
- O. margaritophorus (Bleeker, 1855) (red-striped cardinalfish)
- O. melanoproctus (T. H. Fraser & J. E. Randall, 1976), black-vent cardinalfish
- O. microspilos (G. R. Allen & J. E. Randall, 2002), micro-spot cardinalfish
- O. moluccensis (Valenciennes, 1832), Moluccan cardinalfish
- O. monospilus (T. H. Fraser, J. E. Randall & G. R. Allen, 2002)
- O. multilineatus (Bleeker, 1874), many-lined cardinalfish
- O. nanus (G. R. Allen, Kuiter & J. E. Randall, 1994), tiny cardinalfish
- O. neotes (G. R. Allen, Kuiter & J. E. Randall, 1994), Mini cardinalfish
- O. nigripes (Playfair, 1867), black-foot cardinalfish
- O. nigrocincta (H. M. Smith & Radcliffe, 1912), black-belt cardinalfish
- O. nigrofasciatus (Lachner, 1953), black-stripe cardinalfish
- O. norfolcensis (J. D. Ogilby, 1888), Norfolk cardinalfish
- O. notatus (Houttuyn, 1782), spot-nape cardinalfish
- O. novemfasciatus (G. Cuvier, 1828), seven-striped cardinalfish
- O. ocellicaudus (G. R. Allen, Kuiter & J. E. Randall, 1994), tail-eye cardinalfish
- O. oxina (T. H. Fraser, 1999)
- O. oxygrammus (G. R. Allen, 2001), sharp-line cardinalfish
- O. pallidofasciatus (G. R. Allen, 1987), pale-striped cardinalfish
- O. pallidus (G. R. Allen & Erdmann, 2017)
- O. parvulus (H. M. Smith & Radcliffe, 1912)
- O. pleuron (T. H. Fraser, 2005), Rib-bar cardinalfish
- O. properuptus (Whitley, 1964), southern orange-lined cardinalfish
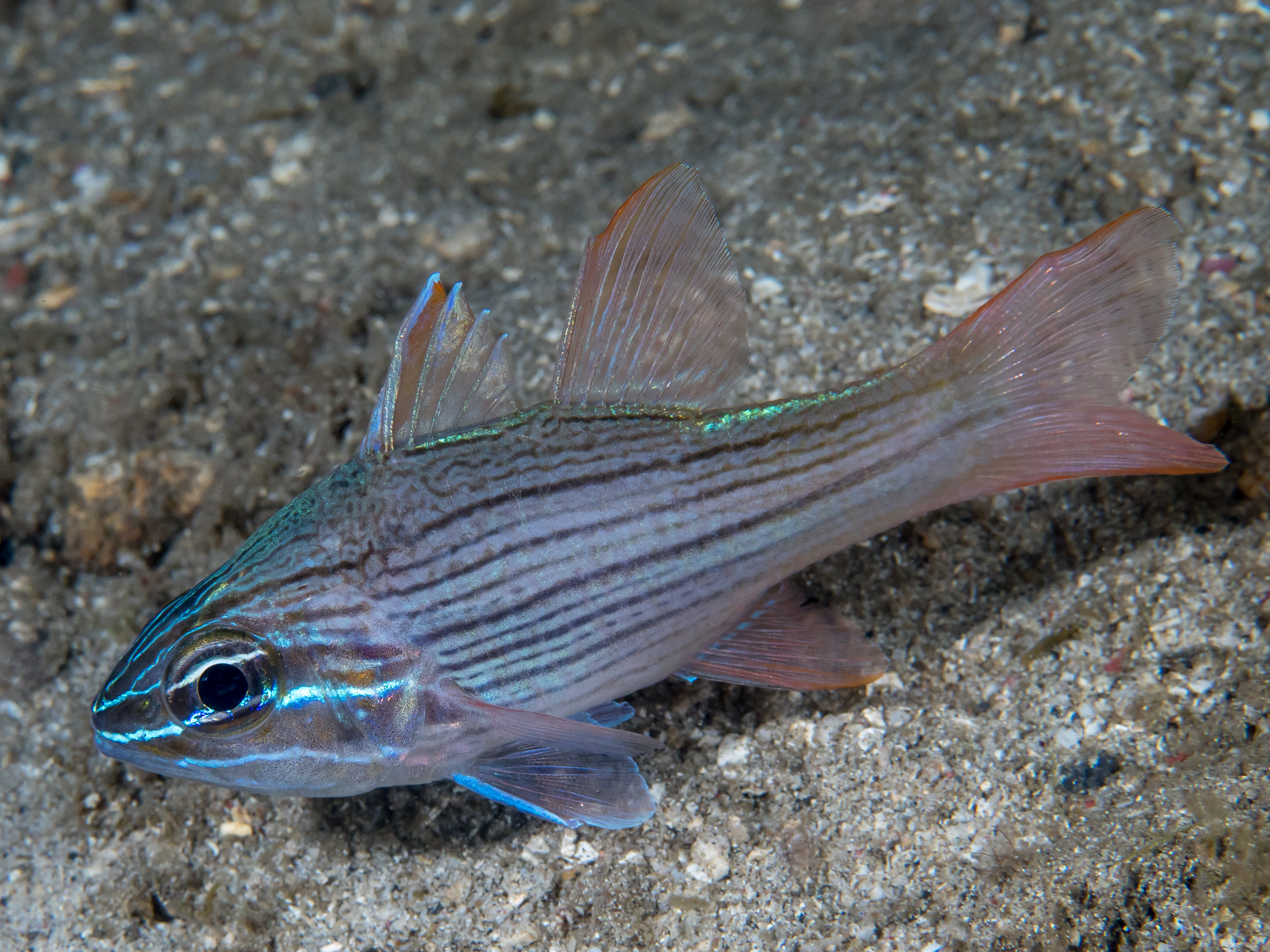
- O. multilineatus
  O. pselion (J. E. Randall, T. H. Fraser & Lachner, 1990)
- O. quadrifasciatus (Cuvier, 1828)
- O. quinquestriatus (Regan, 1908)
- O. radcliffei (Fowler, 1918)
- O. regula (T. H. Fraser & J. E. Randall, 2003)
- O. relativus (J. E. Randall, 2001)
- O. rubrimacula (J. E. Randall & Kulbicki, 1998), ruby-spot cardinalfish
- O. rueppellii (Günther, 1859), western gobbleguts
- O. schlegeli (Bleeker, 1855), Schlegel's cardinalfish
- O. sealei (Fowler, 1918), Seale's cardinalfish
- O. selas (J. E. Randall & Hayashi, 1990), meteor cardinalfish
- O. semilineatus (Temminck & Schlegel, 1843), half-lined cardinalfish
- O. septemstriatus (Günther, 1880), seven-band cardinalfish
- O. sinus (J. E. Randall, 2001)
- O. spilurus (Regan, 1905)
- O. taeniophorus (Regan, 1908), reef-flat cardinalfish
- O. unitaeniatus (G. R. Allen, 1995)
- O. victoriae (Günther, 1859), western striped cardinalfish
- O. wassinki (Bleeker, 1861), Kupang cardinalfish
- O. wilsoni (Fowler, 1918)
- O. yamato Yoshida, Hayashi & Motomura, 2018

Incertae sedis

- O. magnifica (Seale, 1910)
- O. melanopterus (Fowler & B. A. Bean, 1930)
- O. mydrus (D. S. Jordan & Seale, 1905)
- O. nigricans (F. Day, 1875)
- O. popur (Montrouzier, 1857)
