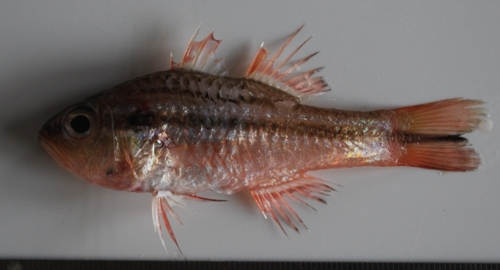

Scientific classification
- Kingdom: Animalia
- Phylum: Chordata
- Class: Actinopterygii
- Order: Gobiiformes
- Family: Apogonidae
- Genus: Ostorhinchus
- Species: O. fasciatus

Binomial name
- Ostorhinchus fasciatus White, 1790

Synonyms
- Mullus fasciatus White 1790; Apogon fasciatus (White 1790); Apogon quadrifasciatus Cuvier 1828; Amia quadrifasciata (Cuvier 1828); Ostorhinchus quadrifasciatus (Cuvier, 1828); Apogonichthyes quadrifasciatus (Cuvier, 1828); Apogonicthyes quadrifasciatus (Cuvier, 1828); Apogon monogramma Günther, 1880; Apogon evanidus Fowler, 1904; Amia elizabethae Jordan & Seale, 1905; Apogon elizabethae (Jordan & Seale, 1905)

= Ostorhinchus fasciatus =

Species of fish

Ostorhinchus fasciatus, commonly known as the broad-banded cardinalfish, is a marine fish native to the Indian and Pacific Oceans which is a Lessepsian migrant to the eastern Mediterranean through the Suez Canal from the Red Sea, it was first recorded off Israel in 2008 and has now reached the southern coast of Turkey. It has a number of vernacular names including barred striped cardinalfish, four-banded soldier-fish, striped cardinalfish and twostripe cardinalfish.

== Description ==
Ostorhinchus fasciatus is an ovoid shaped fish with large eyes, a blunt snout, a large, oblique mouth which reaches the eye and a forked caudal fin. The body shows slight ventral compression. In colour it is a generally white to pinkish grey in colour with two dark stripes on the dorsal half of body: one is a broad, plain stripe either side of the lateral line from the tip of the snout to the central rays of the caudal fin; the second is a narrower stripe starting above eye and reaching to the upper part of the caudal peduncle. It frequently has an incomplete dusky stripe which lies between the two main stripes. Its colour fades to silvery white on the posterior portion of the belly. It has two dorsal fins, the first of which has a tiny spine at the front with the second and third spines being much longer. The anal fin lies directly below the posterior dorsal fin. The colour of the fins is pinkish-orange and larger fish have a line of brown spots on the membranes of second dorsal fin and the anal fin. It grows to a maximum total length of 10.3 cm but is normally 7 cm, standard length

== Distribution ==
Ostorhinchus fasciatus has a natural distribution which is Indo-West Pacific from the Red Sea and Persian Gulf south to Mozambique in the west, eastwards through the Indian Ocean to the western Pacific where it occurs as far north as Japan and as far south as Sydney. Also present in the eastern Basin of the Mediterranean Sea since its first appearance off Israel in 2009, it is now very common from Egypt to Turkey.

== Biology ==
Ostorhinchus fasciatus is a nocturnal species which spends the day among rocks and corals and emerges into more open areas at night to feed on zooplankton. It is a paternal mouthbrooder: the male incubates the eggs in his mouth. In Australia it is known to be preyed upon by the greater crested tern, little pied cormorant and Australian pied cormorant. It is known to be a host of the endoparasitic trematode worms Macvicaria shotteri and Opegaster queenslandicus.

== Naming ==
Ostorhinchus fasciatus was originally described as Mullus fasciatus by the Surgeon-General of New South Wales John White in 1790 in his book Journal of a Voyage to New South Wales. The type locality was Port Jackson.
