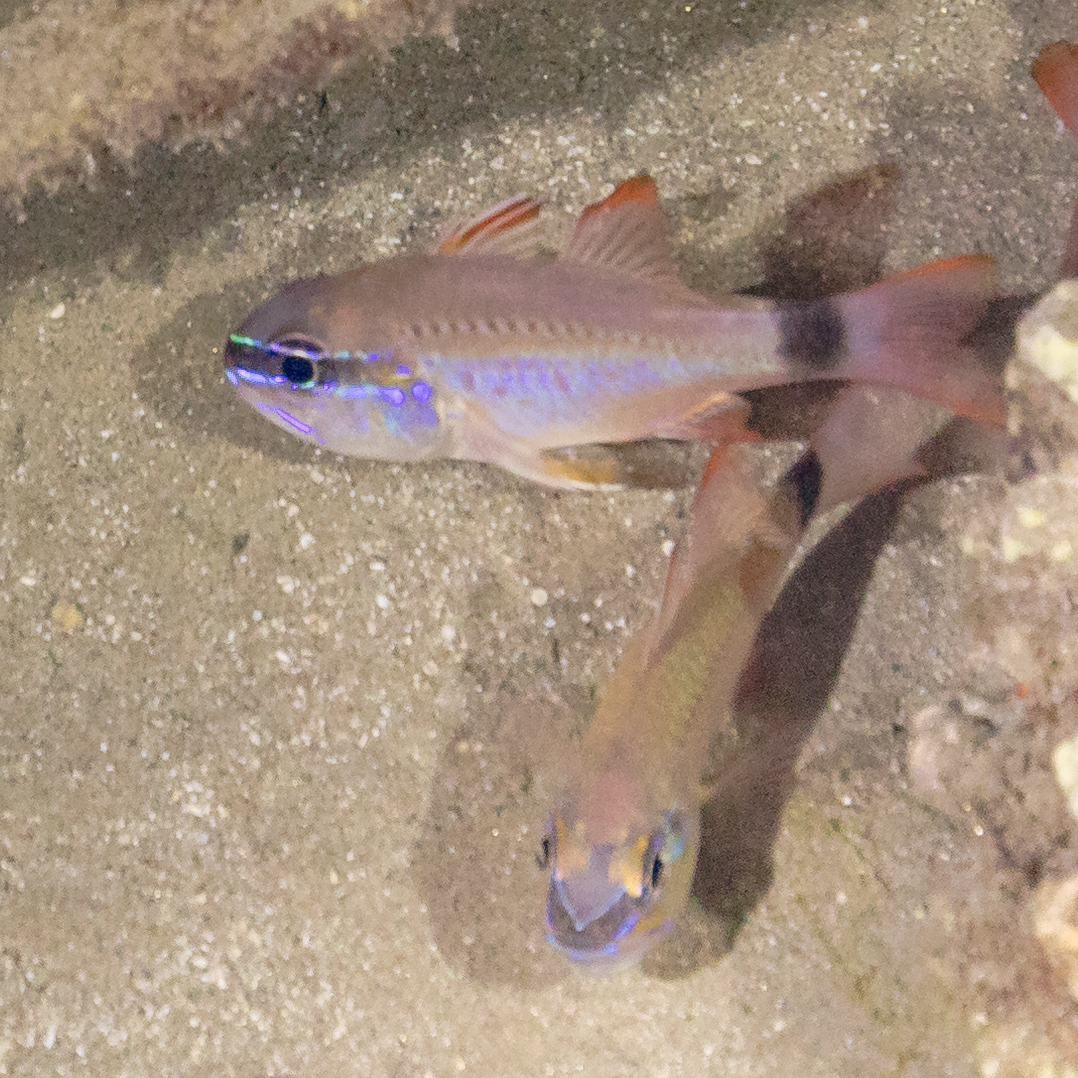

Conservation status
- Least Concern (IUCN 3.1)

Scientific classification
- Kingdom: Animalia
- Phylum: Chordata
- Class: Actinopterygii
- Division: Teleostei
- Order: Gobiiformes
- Family: Apogonidae
- Genus: Ostorhinchus
- Species: O. fleurieu

Binomial name
- Ostorhinchus fleurieu Lacépède, 1802

Synonyms
- Apogon fleurieu (Lacepède, 1802)

= Ostorhinchus fleurieu =

Species of fish

Ostorhinchus fleurieu, the flower cardinalfish, bullseye cardinalfish, gold cardinalfish or ringtail cardinalfish, is a species of marine ray-finned fish belonging to the family Apogonidae, the cardinalfishes. This cardinalfish is found in the Indian and Pacific Oceans.

== Taxonomy ==
Ostorhinchus fleurieu was first formally described as in 1802 by the French naturalist Bernard Germain de Lacépèdewith its type locality given as the Pacific. When Lacépède described this specoies he also described a new genus, Ostorhinchus, with this species as its only species meaning that O. fleurieu is type species of this genus by monotypy. This genus is the only one in the tribe Ostorhinchini within the subfamily Apogoninae. The family Apogonidae is in the suborder Apogonoidei in the order Gobiiformes.

== Etymology ==
Ostorhinchus fleurieu is the type species of the genus Ostorhinchus, this name means "bony snout" and refers to the bony, jagged edges of the jaws of this species which are used like teeth. The specific name fleurieu, honours the French explotrer and hydrographer Charles Pierre Claret, comte de Fleurieu, a friend and colleague of Lacépède.

== Description ==
Ostorhinchus fleurieu has an overall iridescent coppery to pale dusky-pink colour with a wide dark band around the caudal peduncle that is wider in the centre than at the edges, a dark stripe on the snout, and vivid blue lines on the face. The juveniles have a dark spot on the centre of the caudal peduncle instead of a band or bar. This species reaches a standard length of 14.2 cm (5.6 in) and has a short, deep body with a compressed cross section. The first dorsal fin contains 7 spines, the second dorsal fin has a single spine and 9 soft rays and the anal fin has 2 spines and 8 soft rays.

== Distribution and habitat ==
Ostorhinchus fleurieu has a wide Indo-Pacific distribution from the eastern coats of Africa from the Red Sea and Persian Gulf to KwaZulu Natal in South Africa east across the Indian Ocean into Southeast Asia and the Malay Archipelago and into the Pacific south to New Guinea, north to southern China. In Australian waters it is restricted to Ashmore Reef in the Timor Sea. Adults occur in small schools made up of pairs of fish from seven metres (twenty-three feet) to at least seventy-three metres (240 ft) in depth, associated with coral reefs. It normally occurs in shallow areas with coral reefswhere there are moderate currents. It is found with small to large schools which shelter in crevices.
