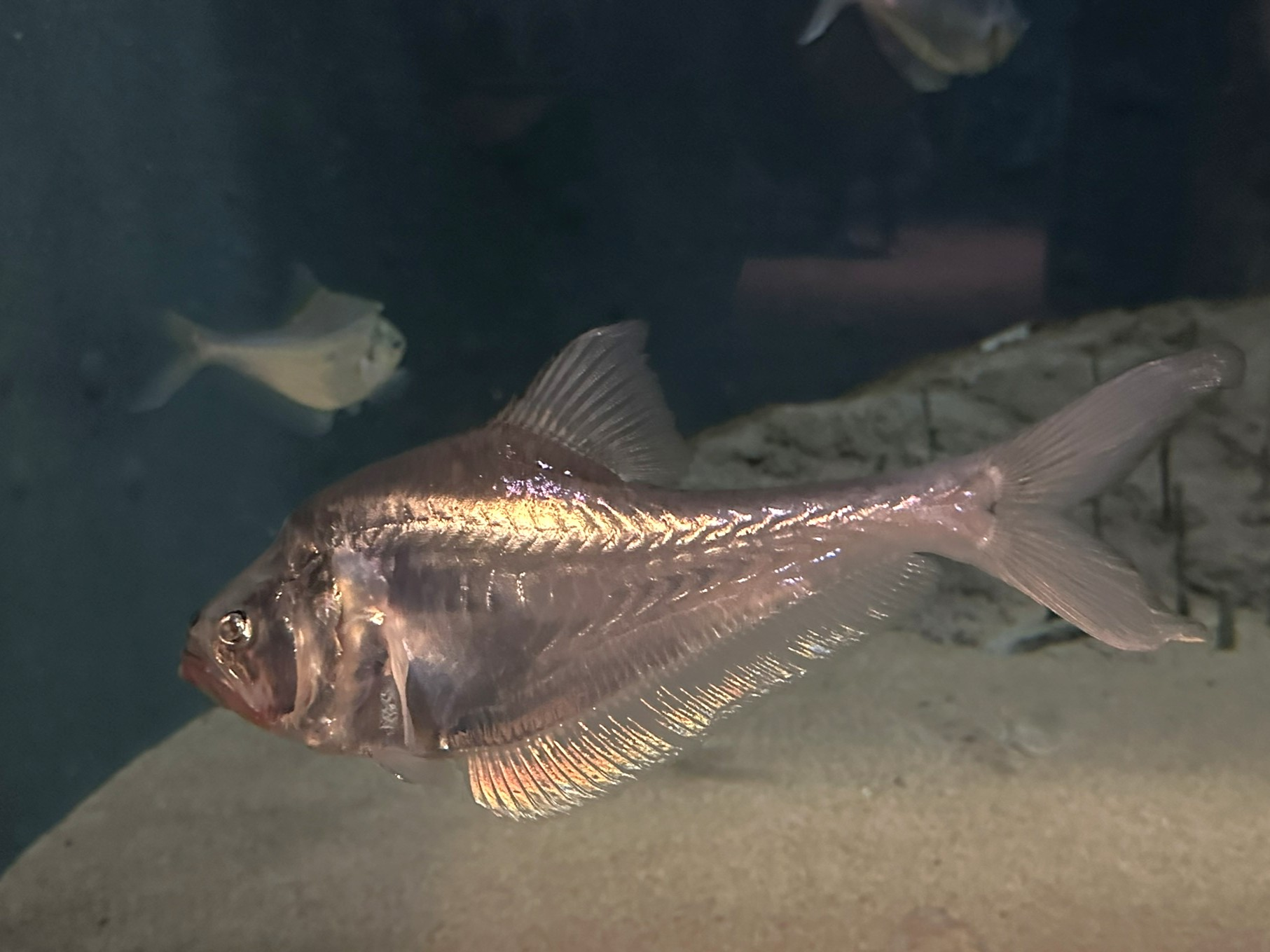
- Kurtus gulliveri
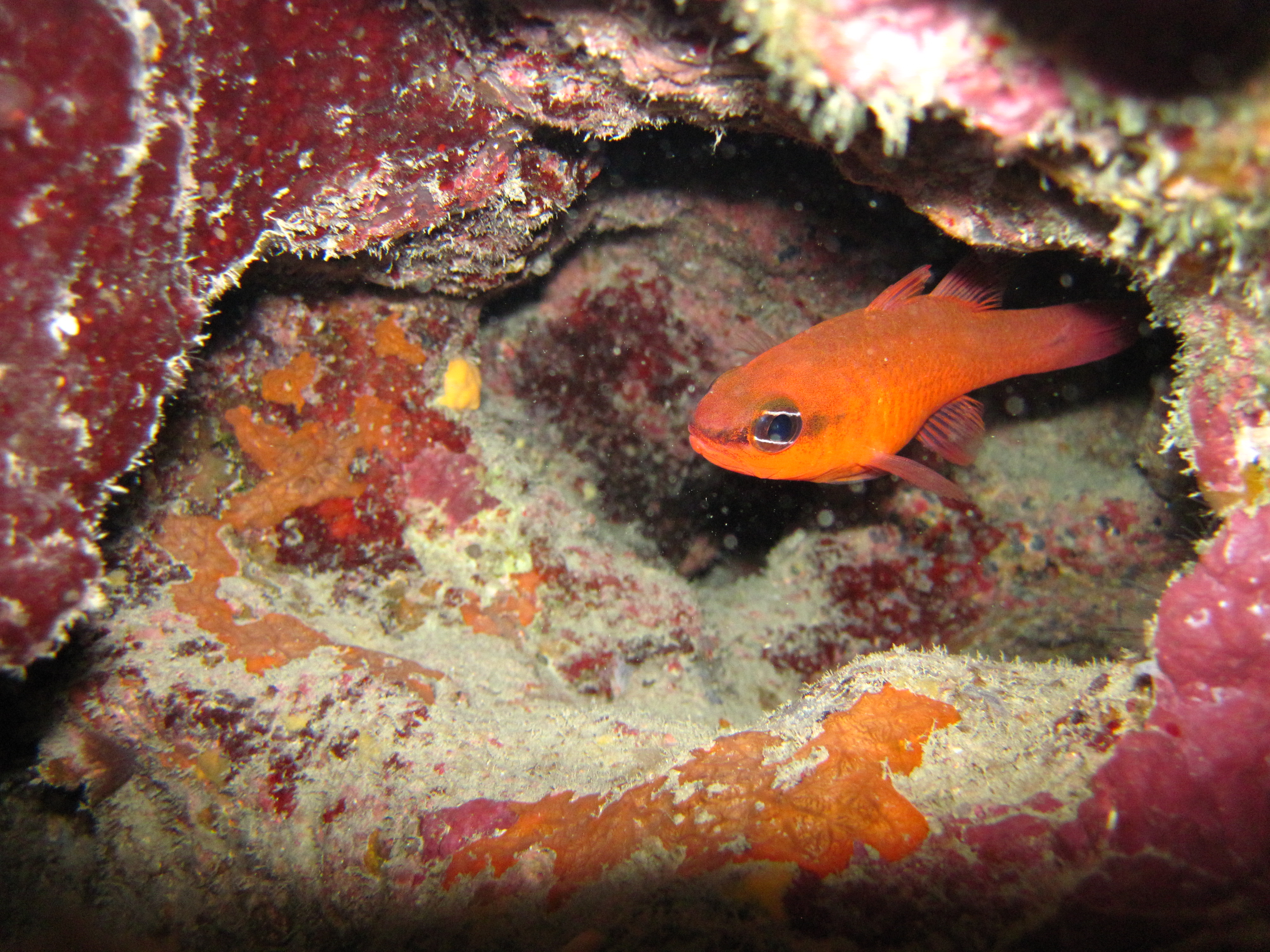
- Apogon imberbis

Scientific classification
- Kingdom: Animalia
- Phylum: Chordata
- Class: Actinopterygii
- Order: Gobiiformes
- Suborder: Apogonoidei; Thacker, 2009

Families
- Kurtidae Bleeker, 1859; Apogonidae Günther, 1859

Synonyms
- Kurtiformes D.S. Jordan, 1923

= Apogonoidei =

Apogonoidei Temporal range: Maastrichtian–present

Order of ray-finned fishes

The Apogonoidei is a suborder of gobiiform fish consisting of two families: the Indo-Pacific Kurtidae (consisting solely of two species in the genus Kurtus) and the much more diverse and widespread Apogonidae (the cardinalfishes). The order is part of the Percomorpha clade and, based on phylogenetic evidence, is considered a sister taxon to the gobies and sand divers. In some older treatments, it is instead treated as its own order, Kurtiformes (/ˈkɜːrtɪfɔːrmiːz/).

== Relationships and defining characteristics ==
A close relationship between the Kurtidae and Apogonidae was postulated based on the similarity of constituent parts of their dorsal gill arches and that in both groups the eggs have filaments on the micropyle, which enable the eggs to form a mass. This mass is brooded in the mouth in the Apogonidae and borne on the supraoccipital hook of at least one of the two nursery fishes in the Kurtidae. They also have horizontal and vertical rows of sensory papillae on their heads and bodies, which are often arranged in a pattern resembling a grid (similar patterns of sensory papillae can be observed in some species in the Gobiiformes). The two families comprising the Kurtiformes are recovered as sister groups in some molecular phylogenies, but others instead recover them as successive sisters to the Gobiiformes.

== Families ==
Two extant families are classified under the suborder Apogonoidei:

- Kurtidae (Bleeker, 1859) - nurseryfish
- Apogonidae Günther, 1859 - cardinalfish

The suborder was also treated as containing the Pempheridae, but this is now known to be inaccurate, with the pempherids actually belonging to the Acropomatiformes. The earliest fossil evidence of the group is apogonid otoliths from the Maastrichtian.
