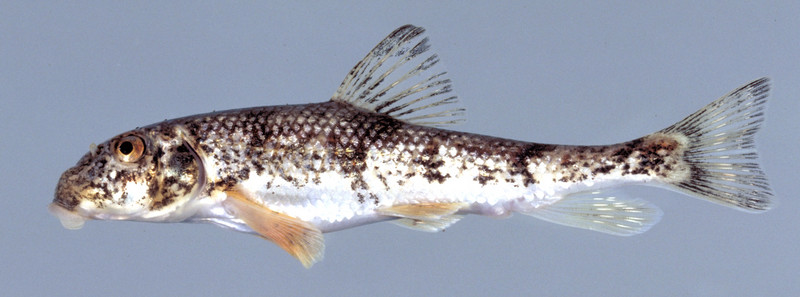

Conservation status
- Least Concern (IUCN 3.1)

Scientific classification
- Kingdom: Animalia
- Phylum: Chordata
- Class: Actinopterygii
- Order: Cypriniformes
- Family: Catostomidae
- Genus: Hypentelium
- Species: H. roanokense

Binomial name
- Hypentelium roanokense Raney & Lachner, 1947

= Roanoke hogsucker =

Species of fish

The Roanoke hogsucker (Hypentelium roanokense) is a freshwater ray-finned fish found in the upper and middle Roanoke River basin in North Carolina and Virginia. It is very similar to and lives in the same area as the northern hogsucker. They are in the sucker family, Catostomidae. They are not considered a game fish and are considered significantly rare due to their limited distribution.

== Description ==
The Roanoke hogsucker can grow to a maximum length of 16 cm. It has a body shape similar to the other hogsuckers, with a boxy head, protruding lips, and dark saddles. The Roanoke hogsucker is often mistaken for the northern hogsucker, but can be distinguished by four features: it has light horizontal lines on its back and sides, poorly developed dark saddles between its head and dorsal fin, 41 scales on its lateral line, and 31 pectoral fin rays.

== Taxonomy ==
The species was first described in 1947 by Edward Cowden Raney and Ernest A. Lachner.

== Distribution and habitat ==
The Roanoke hogsucker is indigenous to the Dan River subdrainage of the upper and middle Roanoke River Basin in North Carolina and Virginia. They have been found in several small tributaries of the Ararat River in the upper Yadkin-Pee Dee River system in North Carolina and Virginia but is believed to have been introduced there from bait buckets.

The Roanoke hogsucker is well adapted to many environments and can be found typically on the bottom throughout its fresh water river ecosystem. It is found in cool and warm streams. It can be found in fast flowing rocky streams and sandy silty bottom pools.

== Diet ==
The Roanoke hogsucker eats small crustaceans, insect larvae (mostly fly larvae), and vegetation on rocks.

== Behavior ==
=== Reproduction ===
The Roanoke hogsucker's life cycle and reproduction have not been fully studied. Males are reproductively mature after one or two years and typically live for four years. Females mature in three years and typically live for five years. Spawning occurs early to mid-spring. Very little is known about their breeding habits.

== Human interest ==
The Roanoke hogsucker is often found in the same areas as bass but is not considered a game fish. It is considered "significantly rare" by the North Carolina Natural Heritage Program because of its limited distribution. It poses no threat to humans. The populations are in no immediate danger but could be quickly harmed if the habitat they live in is not protected from human damage.

== See also ==
- Hypentelium etowanum (D. S. Jordan, 1877) (Alabama hog sucker)
- Hypentelium nigricans (Lesueur, 1817) (northern hog sucker)
