= Nectamia annularis =

Conservation status
- Least Concern (IUCN 3.1)

Scientific classification
- Kingdom: Animalia
- Phylum: Chordata
- Class: Actinopterygii
- Division: Teleostei
- Order: Gobiiformes
- Family: Apogonidae
- Genus: Nectamia
- Species: N. annularis

Binomial name
- Nectamia annularis Rüppell, 1829

Synonyms
- Apogon annularis Rüppell, 1829; Apogon erdmani Lachner, 1951

Species of fish

Nectamia annularis, the tailring cardinalfish, ringtail cardinalfish or blackring cardinalfish, is a species of marine ray-finned fish belonging to the family Apogonidae, the cardinalfishes. This cardinalfish is found in the Western Indian Ocean.

== Taxonomy ==
Nectamia annularis was first formally described as Apogon annularis in 1829 by the German naturalist and explorer Eduard Rüppell with its type locality given as El-Tor, on the Sinai coast of Egypt in the Gulf of Suez, northern Red Sea. This species is now classified in the genus Nectamia, which was described in 1917 by David Starr Jordan with Apogon fuscus as its type species by monotypy. This genus is placed in the tribe Sphaeramiini, which contains five other genera, within the subfamily Apogoninae. The family Apogonidae is in the suborder Apogonoidei in the order Gobiiformes.

== Etymology ==
Nectamia annularis is a classified in the genus Nectamia, a name which Jordan did not explain. It prefixes Amia, a non binomial name originally coined by Laurens Theodorus Gronovius for the genus Apogon which is now used as a common suffix for genus names within the cardinalfish family, with nect- may be derived from the Greek nḗktēs, which means "swimmer". however the fishes in this genus are not very strong swimmers. The specific name annularis, means "ring-shaped" in Latin, which may refer to the silver-coloured ring round the pupil or the wide blackish-brown ring around the caudal peduncle.

== Description ==
Nectamia annularis is a small sized fish which grows up to 7 cm. Its body has an elongate appearance, compressed laterally and with a round profile. It has two translucide dorsal fins, one lateral line, a large mouth and big round eyes. Its body coloration is uniformy copper or bronze with a white margined black ring around the caudal peduncle.

== Distribution & habitat ==
Nectamia annularis is found in tropical waters of the western part of the Indian Ocean, including the Red Sea and the Gulf of Aden, having been recorded in the sea off Egypt, Eritrea, Israel and Yemen . They are found in shallow water near coral reefs up to 17 metres (56 ft) depth.

== Feeding ==
Nectamia annularis is a zooplankton-eater.

== Behaviour ==
Tailring cardinalfish is a nocturnal species which when feeding, may be solitary or gather in small groups in shallow water above the coral reef. During daytime, they usually hide in reef crevices and caves.
