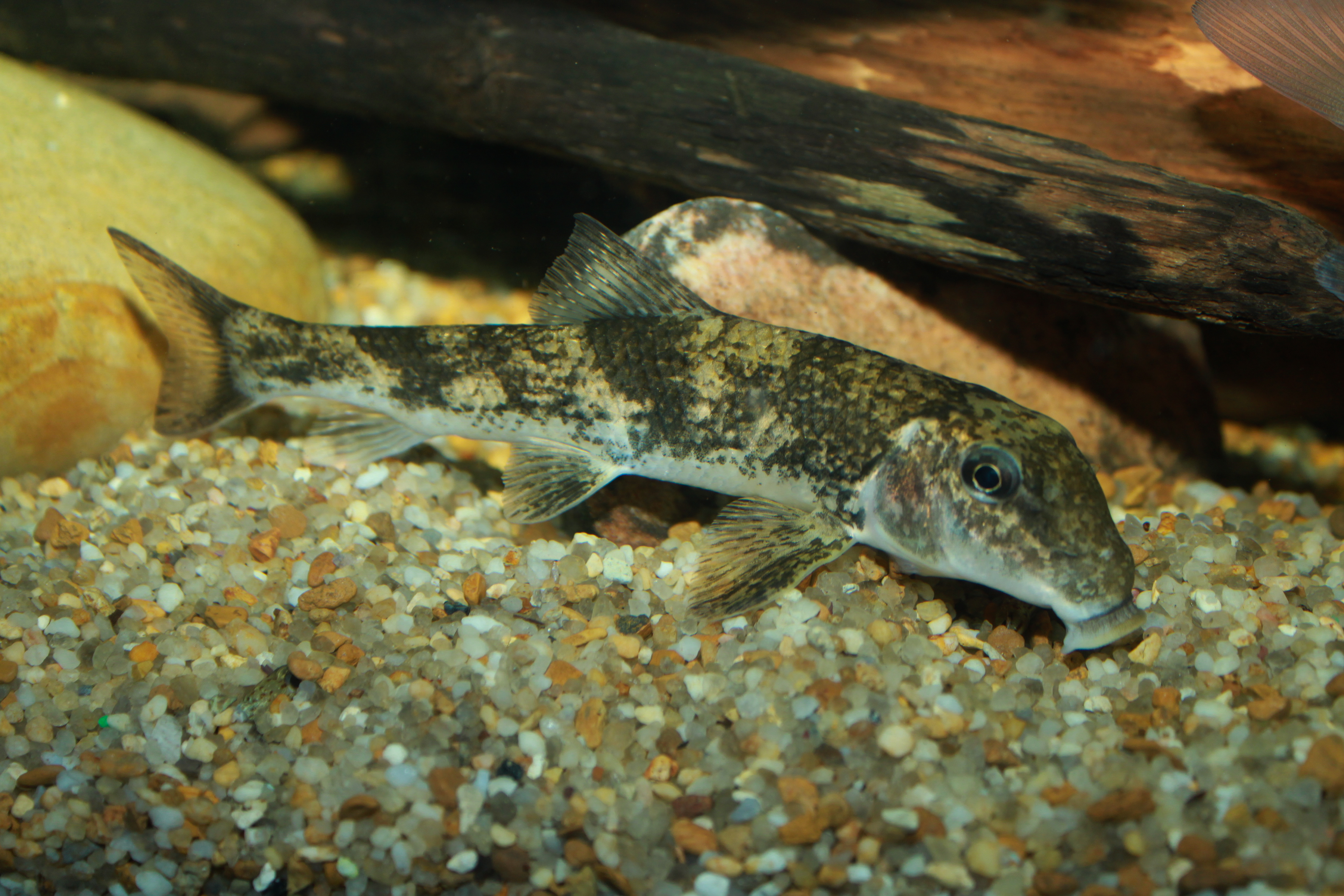
- Northern hogsucker, H. nigricans

Scientific classification
- Kingdom: Animalia
- Phylum: Chordata
- Class: Actinopterygii
- Order: Cypriniformes
- Family: Catostomidae
- Subfamily: Catostominae
- Genus: Hypentelium; Rafinesque, 1818

Type species
- Exoglossum macropterum Rafinesque, 1818

= Hypentelium =

Genus of fishes

Hypentelium is a genus of suckers found in eastern United States and Canada. There are three recognized species of them.

== Species ==
- Hypentelium etowanum (D. S. Jordan, 1877) (Alabama hog sucker)
- Hypentelium nigricans (Lesueur, 1817) (Northern hog sucker)
- Hypentelium roanokense Raney & Lachner, 1947 (Roanoke hog sucker)
