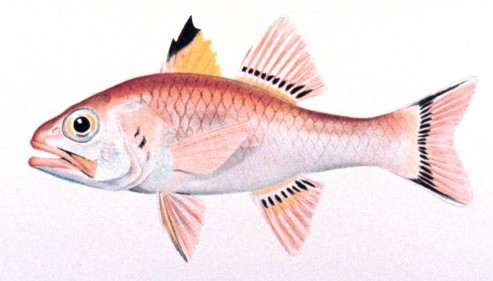

Conservation status
- Least Concern (IUCN 3.1)

Scientific classification
- Kingdom: Animalia
- Phylum: Chordata
- Class: Actinopterygii
- Division: Teleostei
- Order: Gobiiformes
- Family: Apogonidae
- Genus: Pristiapogon
- Species: P. taeniopterus

Binomial name
- Pristiapogon taeniopterus (Bennett, 1836)

Synonyms
- Apogon taeniopterus Bennett, 1836; Apogon menesemops Lachner, 1953

= Pristiapogon taeniopterus =

Species of fish

Pristiapogon taeniopterus, the bandfin cardinal fish, is a species of marine ray-finned fish in the family Apogonidae, the cardinalfishes. This cardinalfish has a scatteted distribution in the Indian Ocean but is more widespread in the Western Pacific Ocean..

== Taxonomy ==
Pristiapogon taeniopterus was first formally described as Apogon taeniopterus in 1836 by the English zoologist Edward Turner Bennett with its type locality given as Mauritius. It has since been placed in the genus Pristiapogon, which was described by Carl Benjamin Klunzinger, as a subgenus of Apogon, in 1870 with A. fraenatus Valenciennes, 1832 as its type species by monotypy. The genus Pristiapogon is sometimes classified as the type genus of the tribe Pristiapogonini in the subfamily Apogoninae and the family Apogonidae in the suborder Apogonoidei in the order Gobiiformes.

== Etymology ==
Pristiapogon taeniopterus belongs to the genus Pristiapogon, a anme which prefixes the genus name Apopgon with pristi-, which means "sawyer", probably a reference to the serrated ridge on the preoperculum of the type species, P. fraenatus. The specific name, taeniopterus means "ribbon-finned", an allusion to the black band on the margin of the caudal fin.

== Description ==
Pristiapogon taeniopterus has a short, deep body with a compressed cross section which reaches a total length of 19.6 cm (7.7 in). The first dorsal fin has eight spines while the second has one spine and nine soft rays. The anal fin has two spines and eight soft rays. The main distinguishing feature of this cardinalfish is that the black band at the base of both lobes of the caudal fin is interrupted at the centre. The upper body and head are dark brown, the lower body is silvery to dusky tan; the scale margins of many scales above the lateral line are pale. The pectoral fins are pale pink; the black bar on the anal fin has a milky white borders, the bllack markings on the second dorsal fin has a white rear border. The caudal pedunclehas a black band circling round it. The outer rays of the caudal fin are whitish, the tips of its rays and membranes are blackish.

== Distribution and habitat ==
Pristiapogon taeniopterus is found near the smaller islands of the Indian Ocean at St. Brandon, the western Mascarenes, Cocos (Keeling) Islands and Christmas Island. In the Western Pacific Ocean it has a wider distribution but still avoids the larger islands and continental shelf. Its Pacific range extends from Indonesia and encompasses the Mariana Islands, Caroline Islands, Micronesia, New Caledonia, Marshall Islands, the Samoan Islands, Phoenix Islands, Tonga, Cook Islands, Line Islands, Society Islands, Tuamotu Archipelago, Marquesas Islands and Pitcairn Islands. In Hawaii and the Johnston Atoll the similar P. menesmus replaces this taxon. The bandfin cardinalfish is found on rocky and seaward reefs around islands.

== Biology ==
Pristiapogon taeniopterus feeds on zoobenthos, small fishes, and crustaceans. It is a nocturnal fish which shelters in the reef during the day.
