= Gobiopsis woodsi =

Conservation status
- Least Concern (IUCN 3.1)

Scientific classification
- Kingdom: Animalia
- Phylum: Chordata
- Class: Actinopterygii
- Order: Gobiiformes
- Family: Gobiidae
- Genus: Gobiopsis
- Species: G. woodsi

Binomial name
- Gobiopsis woodsi Lachner & McKinney, 1978

Species of fish

Gobiopsis woodsi, also known as Woods' barbelgoby, is a species of goby found in the Indo-west Pacific.

== Description ==
This species reaches a length of 4.2 cm (1.7 in).

== Etymology ==
The fish is named in honor of Loren P. Woods (1914–1979), the Curator of Fishes, at the Field Museum of Natural History in Chicago, it was he who collected all but two of the known specimens at the time.
