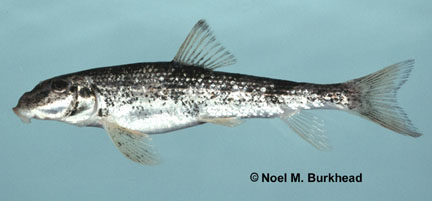
- Hypentelium etowanum

Conservation status
- Least Concern (IUCN 3.1)

Scientific classification
- Kingdom: Animalia
- Phylum: Chordata
- Class: Actinopterygii
- Order: Cypriniformes
- Family: Catostomidae
- Genus: Hypentelium
- Species: H. etowanum

Binomial name
- Hypentelium etowanum (D. S. Jordan, 1877)

= Alabama hog sucker =

Species of fish

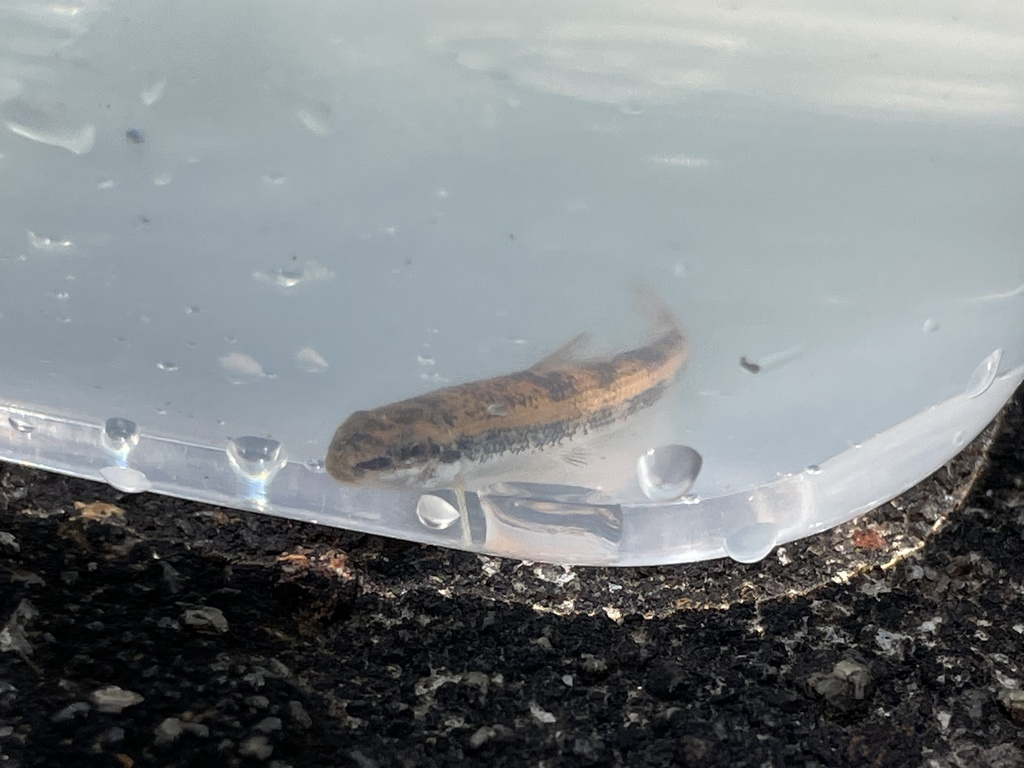
Juvenile captured from Disharoon Creek, Georgia

The Alabama hog sucker (Hypentelium etowanum) is a species of fish in the family Catostomidae, the suckers. It is native to several river systems in the southeastern United States. Its range includes much of the state of Alabama and extends into parts of Mississippi, Tennessee, and Georgia.

== Description ==
This fish grows up to 23 centimeters in length. It has dark bars along its back, horizontal pale stripes, and orange fins.

== Taxonomy ==
This is one of three species in the genus Hypentelium. Hypentelium roanokense inhabits the Atlantic slope. There is a historical connection of the Tennessee River with the Mobile Basin, suggesting a closer sister relationship between Hypentelium nigricans and H. etowanum.

== Distribution ==
The fish lives in the Chattahoochee River and Mobile Bay drainages and nearby creeks. The species was named for the Etowah River of Georgia.

== Biology and ecology ==
This species lives in clear water on rocky and gravelly substrates in riffles, creeks, and streams.

It feeds on bottomdwelling life by rummaging through rocks with its bony head, long snout, and sucker mouth. A diet analysis showed that 90.6% of the contents in their stomachs were Diptera, with Chironomidae larvae making up 88.8% of all food items.

This species likely has a lifespan of over five years. Sexual maturity is attained around three years of age or at a length around 110 millimeters. It grows in size and weight most rapidly in spring due to increased feeding spurred by the impending spawning season. It spawns over gravel in pools and riffles. Typically when spawning, one female is flanked on each side by two males. Once eggs are released and fertilized there is no parental care invested and they hatch after ten days.

== Conservation and management ==
This species is not considered to be threatened or endangered. It has a limited range but the population is relatively large and stable and divided into many subpopulations. There are no major threats. It is considered to be a common fish in its range.
