= Pristicon trimaculatus =

Conservation status
- Least Concern (IUCN 3.1)

Scientific classification
- Kingdom: Animalia
- Phylum: Chordata
- Class: Actinopterygii
- Division: Teleostei
- Order: Gobiiformes
- Family: Apogonidae
- Genus: Pristicon
- Species: P. trimaculatus

Binomial name
- Pristicon trimaculatus (Cuvier, 1828)

Synonyms
- Apogon trimaculatus Cuvier, 1828; Apogon koilomatodon Bleeker, 1853

Species of fish

Pristicon trimaculatus, the three-spot cardinalfish, is a species of is a species of marine ray-finned fish belonging to the family Apogonidae, the cardinalfishes. This cardinalfish is found in the eastern Indian and western Pacific Oceans.

== Taxonomy ==
Pristicon trimaculatus was first formally described as Apogon trimaculatus in 1828 by the French zoologist Georges Cuvier in volume 2 of Histoire naturelle des poissons with its type locality given as Buro Island in the Moluccas. This species is now classified in the genus Pristicon, which was described in 1972 by Thomas Henry Fraser as a subgenus of Apogon with this species designated as its type species. The genus Pristicon along with Pristiapogon, is placed in the tribe Pristiapogonini within the subfamily Apogoninae. The family Apogonidae is in the suborder Apogonoidei in the order Gobiiformes.

== Etymology ==
Pristicon trimaculatus is the type species of the genus Pristicon, this name combines pristis, meaning "sawyer", although in this case it is used to mean "saw", an allusion to the serrated bones on the head, with icon, meaning and "image" or "representation" which refers to its similarity to Pristiapogon.

== Description ==
Pristicon trimaculatus has a fusiform body with a compressed cross section and it reaches a maximum standard length of 14.2 cm (5.6 in). The dorsal fins have a total of 7 spines and 9 soft rays while the anal fin has 2 spines and 8 soft rays. The overall colour of this species is pale grey or brown with black bars under the dorsal fin, some of which are vertical and some of which are slightly oblique, one forms a Y shape. There is often a circular black spot on the cheek and another on the caudal peduncle.

== Distribution and habitat ==
Pristicon trimaculatus is found in the eastern Indian Ocean through the Malay Archipelago into the western Pacific Ocean as far north as southern Japan, east to the Marshall Islands, Samoa and Tonga, south to Australia and New Caledonia. It is found at depths between 1 and 35 m (3 ft 3 in and 114 ft 10 in) in crevices and ledges on coral and rocky reefs.

== Behaviour ==
Pristicon trimaculatus is a nocturnal, solitary species. They form distinct pairs when spawning and the males are mouthbrooders.
