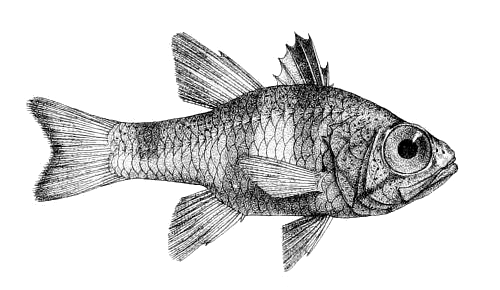
- Nectamia savayensis

Scientific classification
- Kingdom: Animalia
- Phylum: Chordata
- Class: Actinopterygii
- Order: Gobiiformes
- Family: Apogonidae
- Subfamily: Apogoninae
- Genus: Nectamia; D. S. Jordan, 1917

Type species
- Apogon fuscus Quoy & Gaimard, 1825

= Nectamia =

Genus of fishes

Nectamia is a genus of cardinalfishes native to the Indian Ocean and the western and central Pacific Ocean.

== Species ==
The 9 recognized species in this genus are:

- Nectamia annularis (Rüppell, 1829) (ringtail cardinalfish)
- Nectamia bandanensis (Bleeker, 1854) (bigeye cardinalfish)
- Nectamia fusca (Quoy & Gaimard, 1825) (ghost cardinalfish)
- Nectamia ignitops T. H. Fraser, 2008 (fire-eye cardinalfish)
- Nectamia luxuria T. H. Fraser, 2008 (multibarred cardinalfish)
- Nectamia savayensis (Günther, 1872) (Samoan cardinalfish)
- Nectamia similis T. H. Fraser, 2008 (similar cardinalfish)
- Nectamia viria T. H. Fraser, 2008 (bracelet cardinalfish)
- Nectamia zebrinus (T. H. Fraser, J. E. Randall & Lachner, 1999)
