= Platygobiopsis =

Scientific classification
- Kingdom: Animalia
- Phylum: Chordata
- Class: Actinopterygii
- Order: Gobiiformes
- Family: Gobiidae
- Genus: Platygobiopsis; V. G. Springer & J. E. Randall, 1992

Type species
- Platygobiopsis akihito V. G. Springer & J. E. Randall, 1992

Genus of fishes

Platygobiopsis is a genus of gobies native to the western Pacific Ocean.

== Species ==
There are currently four recognized species in this genus:

- Platygobiopsis akihito V. G. Springer & J. E. Randall, 1992 (Imperial goby)
- Platygobiopsis dispar Prokofiev, 2008
- Platygobiopsis hadiatyae Larson, Jaafar, H. H. Tan & Peristiwady, 2020
- Platygobiopsis tansei Okiyama, 2008
