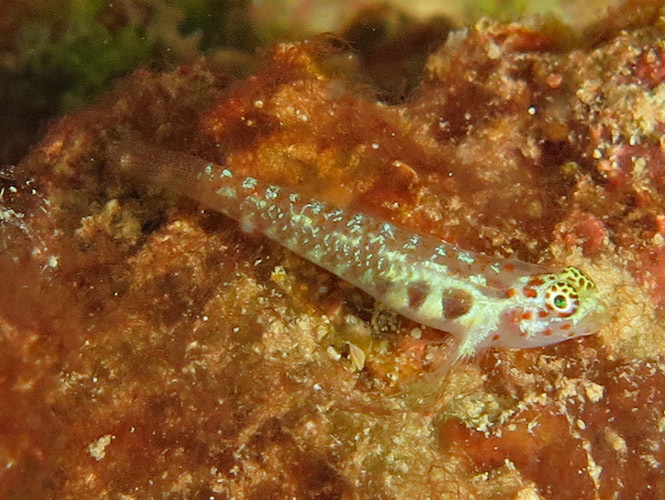

Scientific classification
- Kingdom: Animalia
- Phylum: Chordata
- Class: Actinopterygii
- Division: Teleostei
- Order: Gobiiformes
- Family: Gobiidae
- Genus: Eviota
- Species: E. guttata

Binomial name
- Eviota guttata Lachner & Karnella, 1978

= Eviota guttata =

Species of fish

Eviota guttata, the spotted dwarfgoby, is a species of ray-finned fish from the family Gobiidae, the "true gobies". It is found in the western Indian Ocean.

== Description ==
Eviota guttata has a total of 6–7 spines in its dorsal fins and a total of 8–9 soft rays. The anal fin has a single spine and 8-9 soft rays. It closely resembles Eviota albolineata and its counts or measurements match closely. There are, however, distinct differences in colour, both in live and preserved specimens with this species having a dark spot on the underside of the head about in line with the rear part of the jaws and it also has a few scattered melanophores on the ventral side of the lower jaw near its tip, the intensity of the dark pigmentation varies, from just a few melanophores to a patch of very dark colour, this feature is absent in E. albolineata. They grow to a total length of 3.2 centimetres (1.3 in).

== Distribution ==
Eviota guttata was originally described from specimens taken in the Red Sea and the Gulf of Oman, with the holotype being from an Ethiopian Navy base, Massawa, in modern Eritrea. It is now known to occur in the western Indian Ocean including the Maldives, Seychelles, Red Sea, Gulf of Aqaba, and the Gulf of Oman. Records from the Pacific are probably misidentifications of similar species of Eviota gobies, such as Eviota theresae in Fiji.

== Biology ==
Eviota guttata occurs in inshore areas near continental and island shores where it is associated with shallow reefs with a mixture of coral and algal growths. It can be found in water of less than 15 metres (49 ft) in depth.
