= Gobiopsis springeri =

Scientific classification
- Kingdom: Animalia
- Phylum: Chordata
- Class: Actinopterygii
- Order: Gobiiformes
- Family: Gobiidae
- Genus: Gobiopsis
- Species: G. springeri

Binomial name
- Gobiopsis springeri Lachner & McKinney, 1979

Species of fish

Gobiopsis springeri, also known as Springer's barbelgoby, is a species of goby found in the western-central Pacific Ocean.

== Description ==
This species reaches a length of 3.2 cm (1.3 in).

== Etymology ==
The fish is named in honor of Victor G. Springer (b. 1928), the Curator of Fishes, of the U.S. National Museum, who collected the type specimen.
