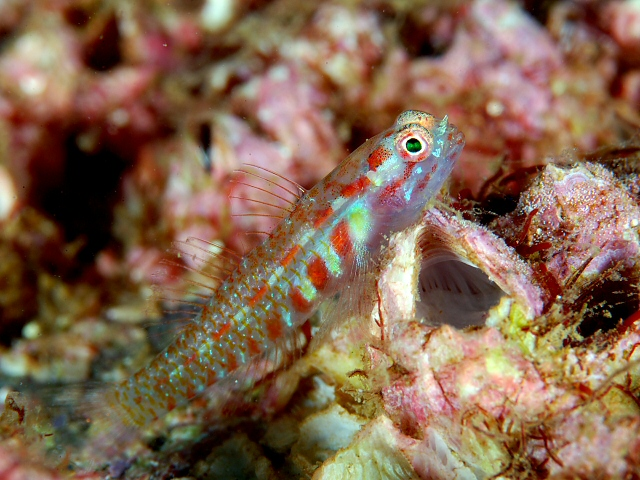
- Eviota albolineata
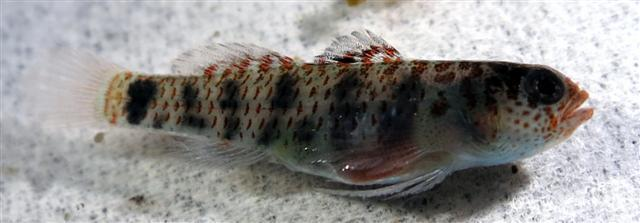
- Eviota epiphanes

Scientific classification
- Kingdom: Animalia
- Phylum: Chordata
- Class: Actinopterygii
- Division: Teleostei
- Order: Gobiiformes
- Family: Gobiidae
- Genus: Eviota; O. P. Jenkins, 1903

Type species
- Eviota epiphanes O. P. Jenkins, 1903

Synonyms
- Allogobius Waite, 1904; Eviotops Smith, 1957; Pennatuleviota Prokofiev, 2007

= Eviota =

Genus of fishes

Eviota is a genus of fishes in the family Gobiidae. Species of the genus are commonly known as dwarfgobies and found in the Indo-Pacific region from Japan to Australia and from Africa to Pitcairn Island. Species of the genus Eviota are mainly associated with coral reefs. Many of these fish are short-lived, with life cycles as brief as 3.5 weeks in the tropics. Some species are hermaphrodites and some representatives live symbiotically among the tentacles of the mushroom coral.

== Species ==
The following species are recognized in the genus Eviota:

- Eviota abax (D. S. Jordan & Snyder, 1901)
- Eviota afelei D. S. Jordan & Seale, 1906 (Afele's dwarfgoby)
- Eviota albolineata S. L. Jewett & Lachner, 1983 (Spotted fringe-fin dwarfgoby)
- Eviota algida D. W. Greenfield & Erdmann, 2014 (Upwelling dwarfgoby)
- Eviota amamiko Fujiwara, Suzuki & Motomura, 2019
- Eviota amphipora Greenfield & Erdmann, 2020
- Eviota ancora D. W. Greenfield & T. Suzuki, 2011* Eviota ancora D. W. Greenfield & T. Suzuki, 2011
- Eviota angustifascia D. W. Greenfield & Erdmann, 2020
- Eviota aquila D. W. Greenfield & S. L. Jewett, 2014 (Dark dwarfgoby)
- Eviota asymbasia D. W. Greenfield & S. L. Jewett, 2016 (Inconsistent dwarfgoby)
- Eviota atauroensis Erdmann, D. W. Greenfield & Tornabene, 2023
- Eviota atriventris D. W. Greenfield & T. Suzuki, 2012 (Black-belly dwarfgoby)
- Eviota bacata D. W. Greenfield, Erdmann & & Teitelbaum, 2024
- Eviota bifasciata Lachner & Karnella, 1980 (Two-stripe dwarfgoby)
- Eviota bilunula D. W. Greenfield & T. Suzuki, 2016 (Crescent dwarfgoby)
- Eviota bimaculata Lachner & Karnella, 1980 (Two-spot fringe-fin dwarfgoby)
- Eviota bipunctata D. W. Greenfield & S. L. Jewett, 2016
- Eviota brahmi D. W. Greenfield & Tornabene, 2014 (Brahm's dwarfgoby)
- Eviota cometa S. L. Jewett & Lachner, 1983 (Comet dwarfgoby)
- Eviota dalyi David W. Greenfield & Luke Gordon, 2019
- Eviota deminuta Tornabene, Ahmadia & J. T. Williams, 2013 (Diminutive dwarfgoby)
- Eviota disrupta Karnella & Lachner, 1981
- Eviota distigma D. S. Jordan & Seale, 1906 (Distigma dwarfgoby)
- Eviota dorsimaculata Tornabene, Ahmadia & J. T. Williams, 2013 (Dorsal-spot dwarfgoby)
- Eviota dorsogilva D. W. Greenfield & J. E. Randall, 2011 (Cream-back dwarfgoby)
- Eviota dorsopurpurea D. W. Greenfield & J. E. Randall, 2011 (Purple dwarfgoby)
- Eviota epiphanes O. P. Jenkins, 1903 (Divine dwarfgoby)
- Eviota epistigmata D. W. Greenfield & S. L. Jewett, 2014 (Twin-spot dwarfgoby)
- Eviota erdmanni Tornabene & D. W. Greenfield, 2016 (Erdmann's dwarfgoby)
- Eviota eyreae D. W. Greenfield & J. E. Randall, 2016 (Eyre's dwarfgoby)
- Eviota fallax D. W. Greenfield & G. R. Allen, 2012 (Twin dwarfgoby)
- Eviota fasciola Karnella & Lachner, 1981 (Barred dwarfgoby)
- Eviota filamentosa T. Suzuki & D. W. Greenfield, 2014 (Thread-fin dwarfgoby)
- Eviota flaviarma D. W. Greenfield & Erdmann, 2021
- Eviota flavipinnata T. Suzuki, D. W. Greenfield & Motomura, 2015 (Yellow-fin dwarfgoby)
- Eviota flebilis D. W. Greenfield, T. Suzuki & Shibukawa, 2014 (Tearful dwarfgoby)
- Eviota fluctiphila D. W. Greenfield, Erdmann & Ronald Mambrasar, 2023 (Surge Dwarfgoby)
- Eviota geminata D. W. Greenfield & Bogorodsky, 2014 (Geminate dwarfgoby)
- Eviota gunawanae Greenfield, Tornabene & Erdmann, 2019
- Eviota guttata Lachner & Karnella, 1978 (Spotted dwarfgoby)
- Eviota herrei D. S. Jordan & Seale, 1906 (Herre's dwarfgoby)
- Eviota hinanoae Tornabene, Ahmadia & J. T. Williams, 2013 (Hinano's dwarfgoby)
- Eviota hoesei A. C. Gill & S. L. Jewett, 2004 (Doug's dwarfgoby)
- Eviota indica Lachner & Karnella, 1980
- Eviota infulata (J. L. B. Smith, 1957) (Epaulet dwarfgoby)
- Eviota inutilis Whitley, 1943 (Chest-spot dwarfgoby)
- Eviota irrasa Karnella & Lachner, 1981 (Unpolished dwarfgoby)
- Eviota japonica S. L. Jewett & Lachner, 1983
- Eviota jewettae D. W. Greenfield & R. Winterbottom, 2012 (Jewett's dwarfgoby)
- Eviota karaspila D. W. Greenfield & J. E. Randall, 2010 (Eastern head-spot dwarfgoby)
- Eviota kermadecensis Hoese & A. L. Stewart, 2012
- Eviota korechika Shibukawa & T. Suzuki, 2005 (Korechika's dwarfgoby)
- Eviota lachdeberei Giltay, 1933 (Red-light dwarfgoby)
- Eviota lacrimae Sunobe, 1988
- Eviota lacrimosa Tornabene, Ahmadia & J. T. Williams, 2013 (Weeping dwarfgoby)
- Eviota lateritea D. W. Greenfield & R. Winterbottom, 2016 (Laterite dwarfgoby)
- Eviota latifasciata S. L. Jewett & Lachner, 1983 (Brown-banded dwarfgoby)
- Eviota lentiginosa Greenfield & Randall 2017
- Eviota longirostris Tornabene, Greenfield & Erdmann 2021
- Eviota maculibotella D. W. Greenfield & R. Winterbottom, 2016 (Spotted-dick dwarfgoby)
- Eviota maculosa Greenfield, Tornabene & Erdmann 2018
- Eviota marerubrum Tornabene, Greenfield & Erdmann 2021
- Eviota marteynae David W. Greenfield & Mark V. Erdmann, 2020
- Eviota masudai Matsuura & Senou, 2006
- Eviota melanosphena D. W. Greenfield & S. L. Jewett, 2016 (Wedge dwarfgoby)
- Eviota melasma Lachner & Karnella, 1980 (Head-spot dwarfgoby)
- Eviota mikiae G. R. Allen, 2001 (White-line dwarfgoby)
- Eviota mimica D. W. Greenfield & J. E. Randall, 2016 (Mimic dwarfgoby)
- Eviota minuta D. W. Greenfield & S. L. Jewett, 2014 (Minute dwarfgoby)
- Eviota monostigma Fourmanoir, 1971 (Single-spot dwarfgoby)
- Eviota natalis G. R. Allen, 2007 (Christmas dwarfgoby)
- Eviota nebulosa J. L. B. Smith, 1958 (Nebulous dwarfgoby)
- Eviota nigramembrana D. W. Greenfield & T. Suzuki, 2013 (Black-bar dwarfgoby)
- Eviota nigripinna Lachner & Karnella, 1980
- Eviota nigrispina D. W. Greenfield & T. Suzuki, 2010 (Black-spine dwarfgoby)
- Eviota nigriventris Giltay, 1933 (Red-belly dwarfgoby)
- Eviota notata D. W. Greenfield & S. L. Jewett, 2012 (Bar-head dwarfgoby)
- Eviota occasa D. W. Greenfield, R. Winterbottom & T. Suzuki, 2014 (Sunset dwarfgoby)
- Eviota ocellifer Shibukawa & T. Suzuki, 2005
- Eviota oculineata Tornabene, Greenfield & Erdmann 2021
- Eviota oculopiperita D. W. Greenfield & Bogorodsky, 2014 (Peppermint-eye dwarfgoby)
- Eviota pamae G. R. Allen, Brooks & Erdmann, 2013
- Eviota pardalota Lachner & Karnella, 1978 (Leopard dwarfgoby)
- Eviota partimacula J. E. Randall, 2008
- Eviota pellucida Larson, 1976 (Neon dwarfgoby)
- Eviota perspicilla Fujiwara, Suzuki & Motomura 2019
- Eviota pictifacies Greenfield & Erdmann 2017
- Eviota pinocchioi D. W. Greenfield & R. Winterbottom, 2012 (Pinocchio dwarfgoby)
- Eviota piperata D. W. Greenfield & R. Winterbottom, 2014 (Peppered dwarfgoby)
- Eviota prasina (Klunzinger, 1871) (Green dwarfgoby)
- Eviota prasites D. S. Jordan & Seale, 1906 (Hair-fin dwarfgoby)
- Eviota pseudaprica Richard Winterbottom & David W. Greenfield, 2020
- Eviota pseudostigma Lachner & Karnella, 1980
- Eviota pseudozebrina Tornabene, Greenfield & Erdmann 2021
- Eviota punctulata S. L. Jewett & Lachner, 1983 (Dotted dwarfgoby)
- Eviota punyit Tornabene, Valdez & Erdmann, 2016
- Eviota queenslandica Whitley, 1932 (Queensland dwarfgoby)
- Eviota raja G. R. Allen, 2001 (King dwarfgoby)
- Eviota randalli D. W. Greenfield, 2009 (Randall's dwarfgoby)
- Eviota readerae A. C. Gill & S. L. Jewett, 2004 (Sally's dwarfgoby)
- Eviota richardi D. W. Greenfield & J. E. Randall, 2016 (Rick's dwarfgoby)
- Eviota rubra D. W. Greenfield & J. E. Randall, 1999
- Eviota rubriceps D. W. Greenfield & S. L. Jewett, 2011 (Red-headed dwarfgoby)
- Eviota rubriguttata D. W. Greenfield & T. Suzuki, 2011
- Eviota rubrimaculata T. Suzuki, D. W. Greenfield & Motomura, 2015 (Red-spot dwarfgoby)
- Eviota rubrisparsa D. W. Greenfield & J. E. Randall, 2010 (Red-speckled dwarfgoby)
- Eviota rubrostriata Shen, Hung & Chen 2024
- Eviota saipanensis Fowler, 1945
- Eviota samota Greenfield, Erdmann & Putra 2025
- Eviota santanai D. W. Greenfield & Erdmann, 2013 (Santana's dwarfgoby)
- Eviota sebreei D. S. Jordan & Seale, 1906
- Eviota sebreei D. S. Jordan & Seale, 1906 (Striped dwarfgoby)
- Eviota shibukawai T. Suzuki & D. W. Greenfield, 2014 (Shibukawa's dwarfgoby)
- Eviota shimadai D. W. Greenfield & J. E. Randall, 2010 (Shimada's dwarfgoby)
- Eviota sigillata S. L. Jewett & Lachner, 1983 (Adorned dwarfgoby)
- Eviota singula D. W. Greenfield & R. Winterbottom, 2016 (One-spot dwarfgoby)
- Eviota smaragdus D. S. Jordan & Seale, 1906 (Emerald dwarfgoby)
- Eviota sodwanaensis D. W. Greenfield & R. Winterbottom, 2016 (Sodwana dwarfgoby)
- Eviota sparsa S. L. Jewett & Lachner, 1983 (Speckled dwarfgoby)
- Eviota specca D. W. Greenfield, T. Suzuki & Shibukawa, 2014
- Eviota spilota Lachner] & Karnella, 1980 (Spotted-fin dwarfgoby)
- Eviota springeri D. W. Greenfield & S. L. Jewett, 2012 (Springer's dwarfgoby)
- Eviota storthynx (Rofen, 1959) (Storthynx dwarfgoby)
- Eviota susanae D. W. Greenfield & J. E. Randall, 1999
- Eviota taeiae Erdmann, D. W. Greenfield & Tornabene, 2023
- Eviota teresae D. W. Greenfield & J. E. Randall, 2016 (Terry's dwarfgoby)
- Eviota tetha D. W. Greenfield & Erdmann, 2014 (Tetha's dwarfgoby)
- Eviota thamani D. W. Greenfield & J. E. Randall, 2016 (Thaman's dwarfgoby)
- Eviota tigrina D. W. Greenfield & J. E. Randall, 2008
- Eviota toshiyuki D. W. Greenfield & J. E. Randall, 2010
- Eviota vader Greenfield, Erdmann & Ishida 2025
- Eviota variola Lachner & Karnella, 1980 (Fin-spot dwarfgoby)
- Eviota winterbottomi D. W. Greenfield & J. E. Randall, 2010 (Dusky-bar dwarfgoby)
- Eviota zebrina Lachner & Karnella, 1978 (Zebra dwarfgoby)
- Eviota zonura D. S. Jordan & Seale, 1906 (Zoned dwarfgoby)
