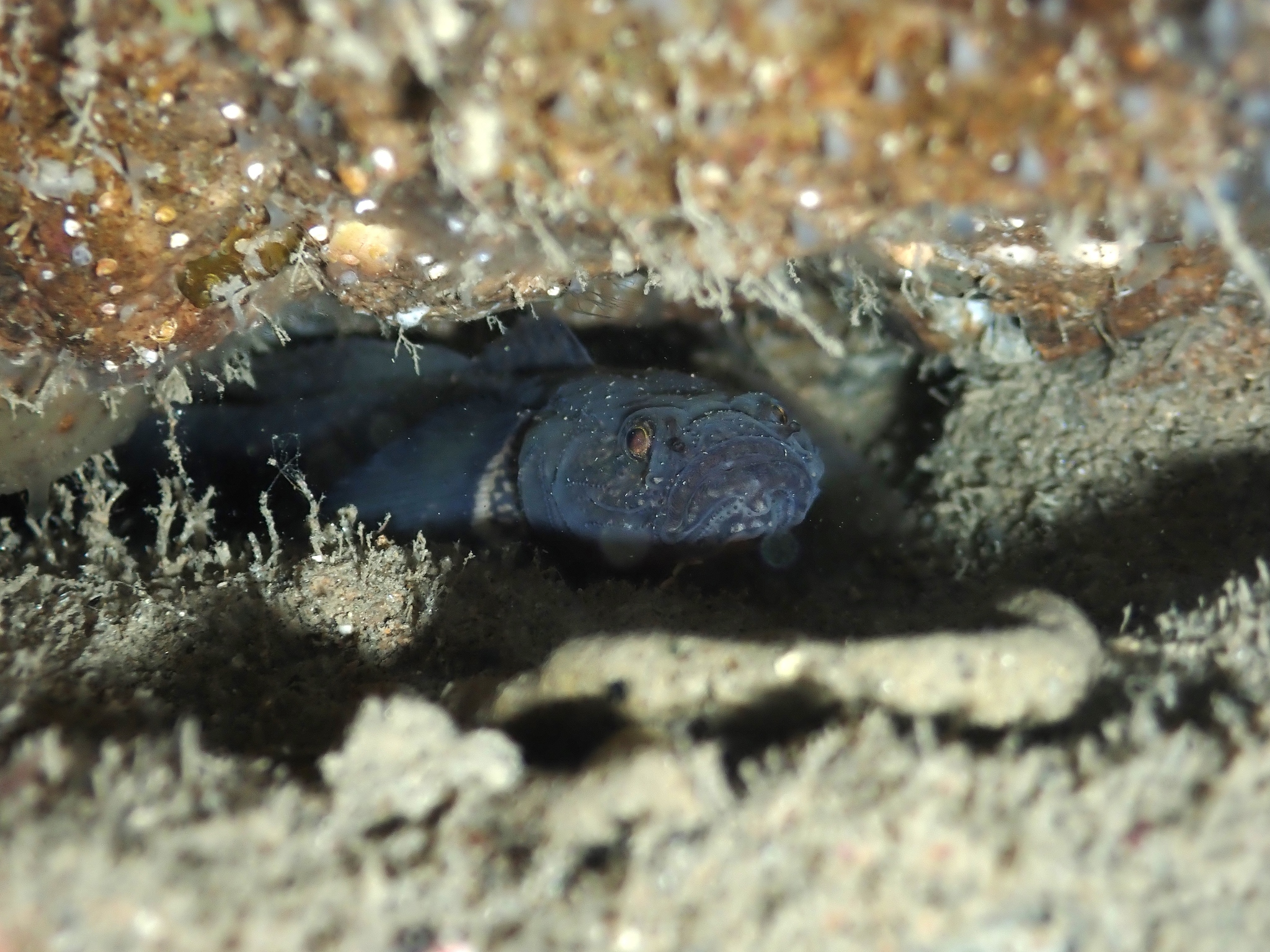

Scientific classification
- Kingdom: Animalia
- Phylum: Chordata
- Class: Actinopterygii
- Division: Teleostei
- Order: Gobiiformes
- Family: Gobiidae
- Genus: Gobiopsis
- Species: G. atrata

Binomial name
- Gobiopsis atrata (Griffin, 1933)

Synonyms
- Callogobius atratus Griffin, 1933

= New Zealand black goby =

Species of fish

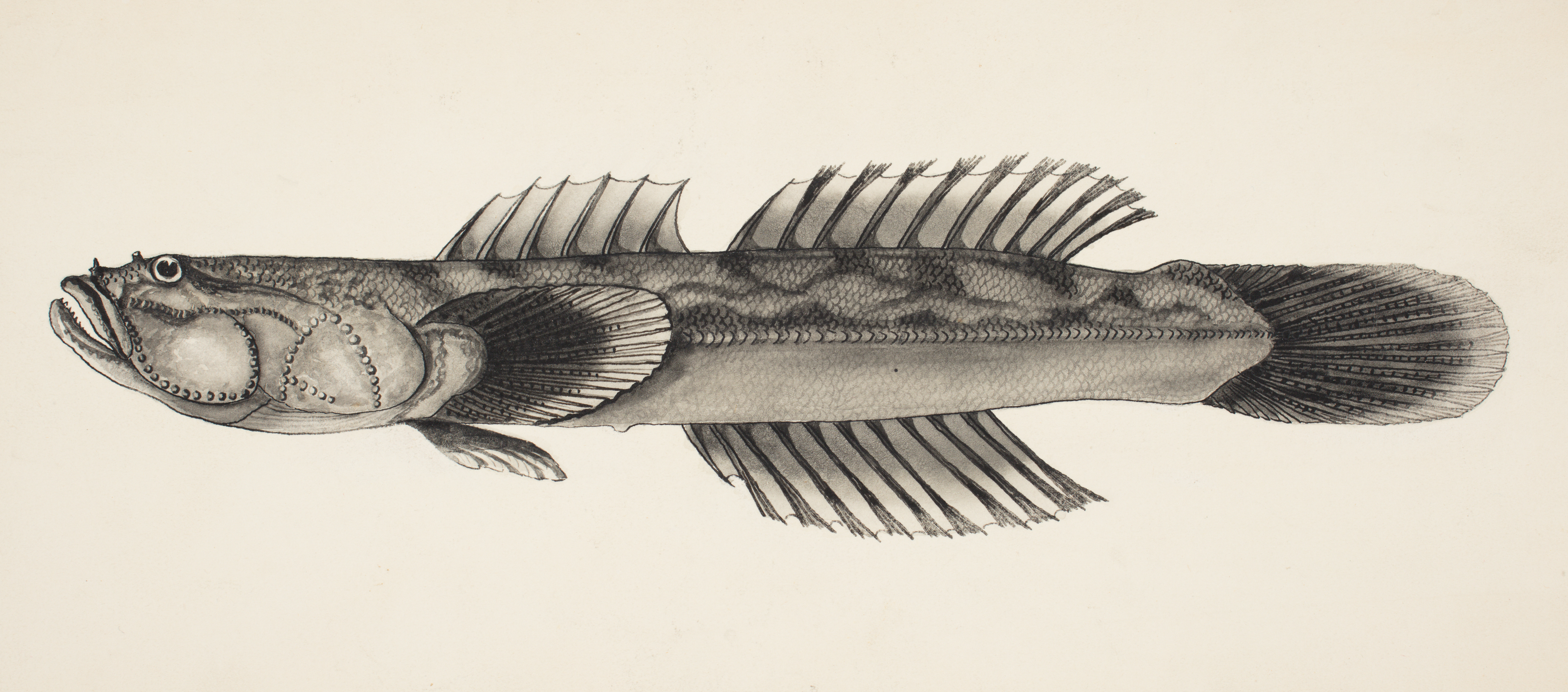
1931 illustration of by Louis Thomas Griffin

Gobiopsis atrata, the New Zealand black goby, is a species of goby endemic to the marine waters around northern New Zealand where it occurs in tide pools and on reefs down to depths of about 30 metres (98 ft). It lives in narrow crevices and is most commonly seen with its head poking out of its lair, to which it will hastily retreat if disturbed.

== Taxonomy ==
First described as a species of Callogobius, then classified as Gobiopsis by Lachner & McKinney in 1979.

== Description ==
The New Zealand black goby is dark brown or black. This species can reach a length of 8.5 centimetres (3.3 in) TL.

== Distribution ==
Endemic to New Zealand waters.
