= Loren P. Woods =

American ichthyologist

Loren Paul Woods (1913–1979) was an American ichthyologist and museum curator at the Field Museum of Natural History In Chicago. He joined the museum's education department as a guide lecturer in 1938. In 1941, he was transferred to the Division of Fishes, from where he retired in 1978. His career was interrupted by a four-year period of duty with the United States Navy during World War II. While he was in the navy, Marion Griswold Grey served as the unpaid curator, becoming an associate at the museum when Woods resumed his post. During his time at the Field Museum, he assembled specimen collections of North American freshwater fish and Atlantic, Indian, and Pacific Ocean marine fish. This material resulted in a major expansion of the museum's fishes holdings, which had previously been a mostly freshwater collection. Woods is best remembered for his publications on damselfish, squirrelfish, and Berycidae.

== Taxon described by him ==
- See Category:Taxa named by Loren P. Woods

== Publications ==
The following are some of Woods' publications:

- Schultz, Leonard P. & Loren P. Woods. 1948 Acanthurus triostegus marquesensis, a new subspecies of surgeonfish, family Acanthuridae, with notes on related forms Journal of the Washington Academy of Sciences 38(7): 248–251.
- Bailey, Reeve M., Ernest A. Lachner, C. C. Lindsey, C. Richard Robins, P. M. Schultz, Leonard P. & Loren P. Woods. 1948 A new name for Synchiropus altivelis Regan, with a key to the genera of the fish family Callionymidae Journal of the Washington Academy of Sciences 38(12): 419–420.
- W. B. Scott & Loren P. Woods. 1960 A list of common and scientific names of fishes from the United States and Canada (second edition) American Fisheries Society Special Publication(2): i–ii, 1–102.
- Schultz, Leonard P. & Loren P. Woods. 1949 Keys to the genera of echelid eels and the species of Muraenichthys of the Pacific, with two new species Journal of the Washington Academy of Sciences 39(5): 169–174.
- Woods, Loren P. & R. H. Kanazawa. 1951 New species and new records of fishes from Bermuda Fieldiana Zoology, New Series 31: 629–644.
- Schultz, Leonard P., Earl S. Herald, Ernest A. Lachner, Arthur D. Welander & Loren P. Woods. 1953 Fishes of the Marshall and Marianas Islands. Volume 1. Families from Asymmetrontidae through Siganidae : i–xxxii, 1–685, pls. 1–74.
- Woods, Loren P. & Leonard P. Schultz. 1953 Subfamily Pomacanthinae
- Woods, Loren P. & R. F. Inger. 1957 The cave, spring, and swamp fishes of the family Amblyopsidae of central and eastern United States The American Midland Naturalist 58(1): 232–256.
- Woods, Loren P. 1955 Western Atlantic species of the genus Holocentrus Fieldiana Zoology, New Series 37: 91–119.
- Woods, Loren P. 1958 A new genus and species of fish from the Gulf of Mexico (family Emmelichthyidae) Fieldiana Zoology, New Series 39: 249–252.
- Woods, Loren P. 1959 Parahollardia schmidti, a new triacanthodid fish from the western Caribbean Copeia 1959(3): 222–225.
- Schultz, Leonard P., W. M. Chapman, Ernest A. Lachner & Loren P. Woods. 1960 Fishes of the Marshall and Marianas Islands. Volume 2. Families from Mullidae through Stromateidae : i–ix, 1–438, pls. 75–123.
- Woods, Loren P. 1961 Chaeotodon goniodes, a new butterfly fish from Puerto Rico Bulletin of Marine Science of the Gulf and Caribbean 10(4): 417–420.
- Woods, Loren P. 1961 A new berycoid fish from Brazil (family Trachichthyidae) Fieldiana Zoology, New Series 39: 525–531.
- Woods, Loren P. 1961 A new species of flatfish, Monolene megalepis, from Puerto Rico and the western Caribbean Sea Copeia 1961(2): 192–195.
- Woods, Loren P. 1965 A new squirrel fish, Adioryx poco of the family Holocentridae from the Bahama Islands Notulae Naturae(377): 1–5.
- Schultz, Leonard P., Loren P. Woods & Ernest A. Lachner. 1966 Fishes of the Marshall and Marianas Islands. Volume 3. Families Kraemeriidae through Antennariidae: i–vii, 1–176, pls. 124–148.
- Woods, Loren P. 1970 Fishes Follett Pub Co ISBN 069542890X
- Woods, Loren P. 1971 Tropical Fish Follett Pub Co. ISBN 9780695301750
- Woods, Loren P. & P. M. Sonoda. 1973 Order Berycomorphi (Beryciformes)
- Greenfield, David W. & Loren P. Woods. 1974 Eupomacentrus diencaeus Jordan and Rutter a valid species of damselfish form the western tropical Atlantic Fieldiana Zoology, New Series 65(2): 9–20.
- Allen, Gerald R. & Loren P. Woods. 1980 A review of the damselfish genus Stegastes from the eastern Pacific with the description of a new species Records of the Western Australian Museum 8(2): 171–198.
- Greenfield, David W. & Loren P. Woods. 1980 Review of the deep-bodied species of Chromis (Pisces: Pomacentridae) from the eastern Pacific, with descriptions of three new species Copeia 1980(4): 626–641.
- Miller, G. C. & Loren P. Woods. 1988 A new species of sciaenid fish, Pareques iwamotoi, from the western Atlantic, with color descriptions of prejuvenile and juvenile Pareques acuminatus and Pareques umbrosus Bulletin of Marine Science 43(1): 88–92.

== Taxon named in his honor ==
As a mark of their respect Woods fellow ichthyologists honoured him with eponyms in the specific names given to new species being described.

These included the

- swallowtail bass (Anthias woodsi),
- Woods's chromis (Chromis woodsi),
- Woods's clingfish (Gobiesox woodsi)

and the

- whitespot soldierfish (Myripristis woodsi).
- The Woods' barbelgoby, Gobiopsis woodsi, Lachner & McKinney, 1978 is a species of goby found in the Indo-west Pacific.

== Personal life ==
Woods was married twice. His first wife was Adele Woods. They had two children. They divorced. He married again on February 14, 1966. They had two more children. His second wife, Mary, and one child from his first marriage and two from his second survive.
