= Eugnathogobius illotus =

Conservation status
- Least Concern (IUCN 3.1)

Scientific classification
- Kingdom: Animalia
- Phylum: Chordata
- Class: Actinopterygii
- Order: Gobiiformes
- Family: Oxudercidae
- Genus: Eugnathogobius
- Species: E. illotus

Binomial name
- Eugnathogobius illotus (Larson, 1999)

Synonyms
- Calamiana illota Larson, 1999

Species of fish

Eugnathogobius illotus is a species of goby native to marine, brackish and fresh waters of Singapore, Thailand, Brunei and the Philippines.

== Taxonomy ==
This species was initially placed in genus Calamiana with the name C. illota. Later research treated Calamiana as a junior synonym of Eugnathogobius; consequently, the species has been classified in the genus Eugnathogobius with the name E. illotus as of 2009. This has been followed by FishBase and IUCN.
