= Gobiopsis canalis =

Conservation status
- Least Concern (IUCN 3.1)

Scientific classification
- Kingdom: Animalia
- Phylum: Chordata
- Class: Actinopterygii
- Division: Teleostei
- Order: Gobiiformes
- Family: Gobiidae
- Genus: Gobiopsis
- Species: G. canalis

Binomial name
- Gobiopsis canalis Lachner & McKinney, 1978

Species of fish

Gobiopsis canalis, the checkered goby, is a species of goby found in the western Indian Ocean, from south-western India to the Persian Gulf, and Oman.

== Description ==
This species reaches a length of 6.3 cm (2.5 in).
