= G. exigua =

G. exigua may refer to:

- Galenia exigua, a perennial herb
- Gentiana exigua, a flowering plant
- Geodia exigua, a marine sponge
- Gobiopsis exigua, a true goby
- Grammoptera exigua, a longhorn beetle
- Grapholita exigua, a tortrix moth
