= Platygobiopsis hadiatyae =

Scientific classification
- Domain: Eukaryota
- Kingdom: Animalia
- Phylum: Chordata
- Class: Actinopterygii
- Order: Gobiiformes
- Family: Gobiidae
- Genus: Platygobiopsis
- Species: P. hadiatyae

Binomial name
- Platygobiopsis hadiatyae Larson, Jaafar, H. H. Tan & Peristiwady, 2020

Species of goby

Platygobiopsis hadiatyae is a species of goby, commonly known as a Renny's flat goby.

== Distribution ==
- Currently only known from Panaitan Strait along the Sunda Strait in Indonesia.

== Etymology ==
- This species is named Renny Kurnia Hadiaty (21 August 1960 to 30 January 2019) of the Indonesian Institute of Sciences, Hadiaty co-authored 19 gobioid species names in addition to many other taxa.

== Size ==
This species reaches a length of 4.3 cm (1.7 in).
