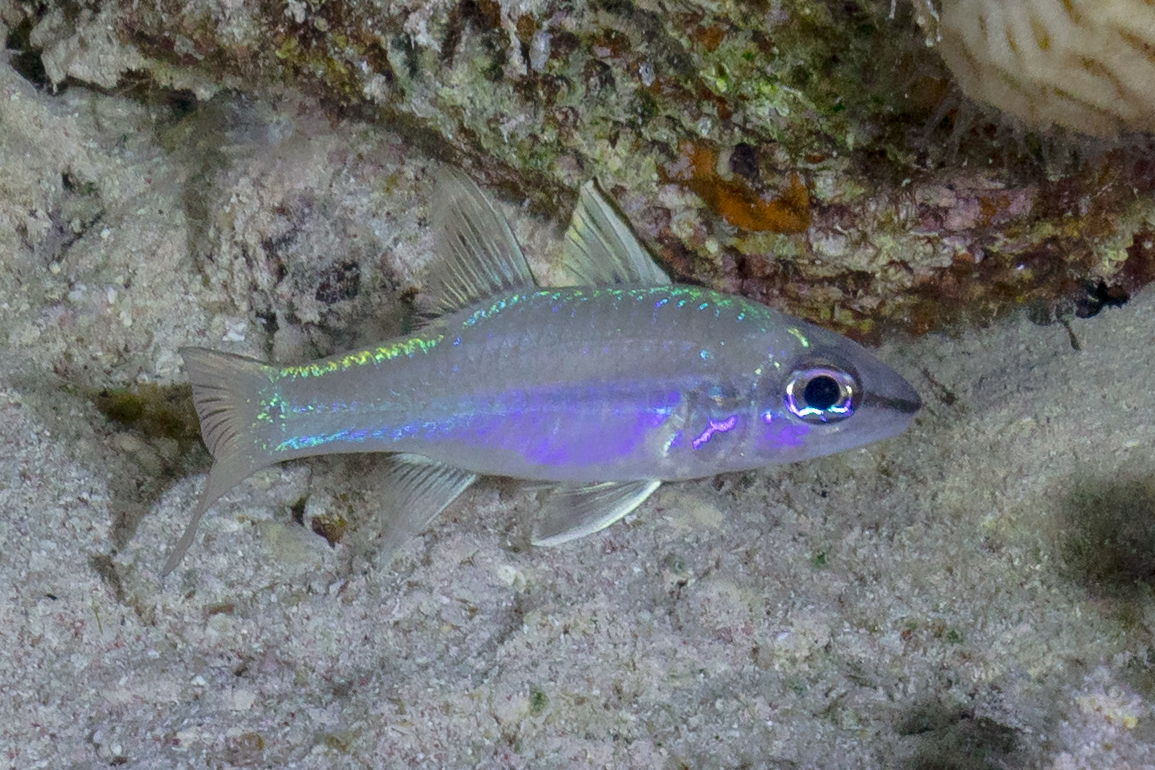

Conservation status
- Least Concern (IUCN 3.1)

Scientific classification
- Kingdom: Animalia
- Phylum: Chordata
- Class: Actinopterygii
- Division: Teleostei
- Order: Gobiiformes
- Family: Apogonidae
- Genus: Pristiapogon
- Species: P. exostigma

Binomial name
- Pristiapogon exostigma (D. S. Jordan & Starks, 1906)

Synonyms
- Amia exostigma D. S. Jordan & Starks, 1906; Apogon exostigma (D. S. Jordan & Starks, 1906)

= Pristiapogon exostigma =

Species of fish

Pristiapogon exostigma, the oneline cardinalfish, eyeshadow cardinalfish, finebridled cardinalfish or narrowstripe cardinalfish, is a species of is a species of marine ray-finned fish belonging to the family Apogonidae, the cardinalfishes. This cardinalfish has a wide distribution in the Indian and Pacific Oceans.

== Taxonomy ==
Pristiapogon exostigma was first formally described as Amia exostigma in 1906 by the American ichthyologists David Starr Jordan and Edwin Chapin Starks with its type locality given as Apia, Upolu Island, Samoa. This species is now classified in the genus Pristiapogon, which was described in 1870 by Carl Benjamin Klunzinger as a monotypuc subgenus of Apogon with Apogon fraenatus its type species by monotypy. The genus Pristiapogon, along with Pristicon, is placed in the tribe Pristiapogonini within the subfamily Apogoninae. The family Apogonidae is in the suborder Apogonoidei in the order Gobiiformes.

== Etymology ==
Pristiapogon exostigma is classified in the genus Pristiapogon, this name prefixes pristis, meaning "sawyer", although in this case it is used to mean "saw" onto the genus name Apogon and is an allusion to the serrated ridge in front of the gill cover in A. fraenatus. The specific name, exostigma, comnines éxō, which means "outer" or "external", with stígma, meaning "mark" or "spot", thought to be an allusion to the obvious circular black spot on the caudal peduncle at the base of the caudal fin rays.

== Description ==
Pristiapogon exostigma has a fusiform body with a compressed cross section and it reaches a maximum total length of 12 cm (4.7 in). This species has 7 spines in the first dorsal fin and a single spine and 9 soft rays in the second dorsal fin, while the anal fin has 2 spines and 8 soft rays. The overal colour is pinkish-brown to pale silvery greyish and there is a tapering stripe along the middle of the flank frequently edged above and below by thin iridescent white stripes. There is a small dark spot on the caudal peduncle just above the lateral line, and the first dorsal fin has a black leading edge.

== Distribution and habitat ==
Pristiapogon exostigma is widely distributed in the Indian and Western Pacific Oceans. In the Indian Ocean it occurs in the Red Sea and in the Comoro Islands, northern Madagascar, Seychelles, Maldives, Sri Lanka, British Indian Ocean Territory, Andaman and Nicobar Islands and Australian territories of Christmas Island and Cocos (Keeling) Islands. In the Pacific Ocean it is found from the Malay Archipelago east to the Line Islands and Pitcairn Islands, north to southern Taiwan and south to northern Australia and New Caledonia. In Australian Pacific waters the oneline cardinalfish is found at Ashmore reef in the Timor Sea, the far north of the Great Barrier Reef and reefs in the Coral Sea at least as far south as the Capricorn Group. P. exostigma is found at depths between 3 and 20 m (9.8 and 65.6 ft), hiding beneath ledges or in isolated coral heads in the inner reef areas.
