= Eugnathogobius =

Scientific classification
- Domain: Eukaryota
- Kingdom: Animalia
- Phylum: Chordata
- Class: Actinopterygii
- Order: Gobiiformes
- Family: Oxudercidae
- Subfamily: Gobionellinae
- Genus: Eugnathogobius; H. M. Smith, 1931

Type species
- Eugnathogobius microps H. M. Smith, 1931

Synonyms
- Calamiana Herre, 1945; Gnathogobius H. M. Smith, 1945

Genus of fishes

Eugnathogobius is a genus of gobies native to fresh, brackish and marine waters of the Indian Ocean and the western Pacific Ocean region.

== Species ==
As of 2025, there are ten recognized species in this genus:

- Eugnathogobius illotus (Larson, 1999)
- Eugnathogobius indicus Larson, 2009
- Eugnathogobius kabilia (Herre, 1940)
- Eugnathogobius mas (Hora, 1923)
- Eugnathogobius mindora (Herre, 1945) (Stripe-face Calamiana)
- Eugnathogobius siamensis (Fowler, 1934)
- Eugnathogobius stictos Larson, 2009
- Eugnathogobius taiwanensis (originally Calamiana) (Chen, Shao & Huang, 2024)
- Eugnathogobius umbra (originally Tamanka) (Herre, 1927)
- Eugnathogobius variegatus (W. K. H. Peters, 1868)
