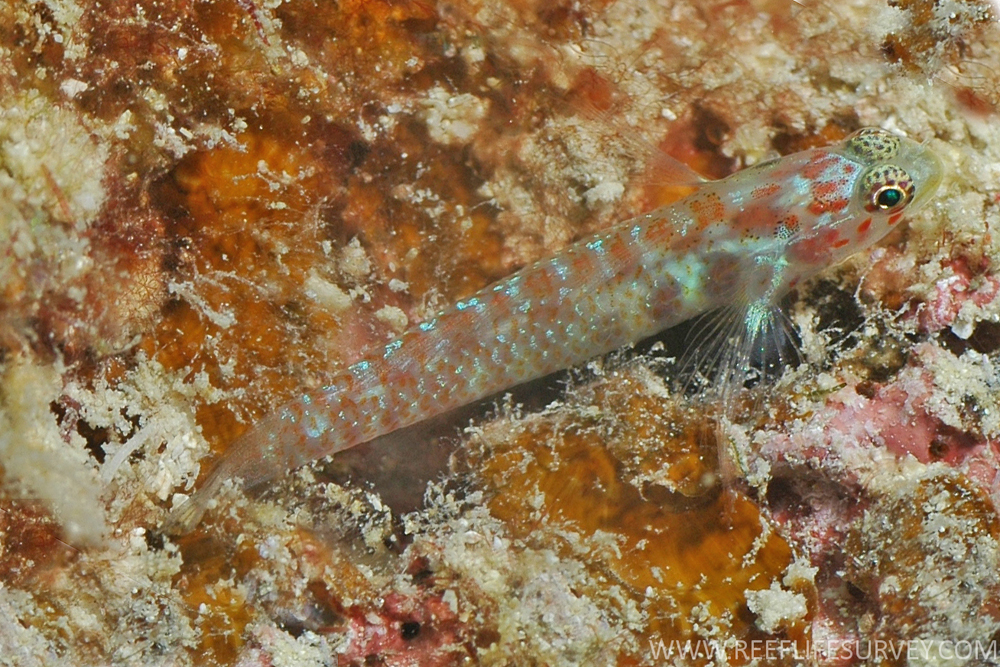

Conservation status
- Least Concern (IUCN 3.1)

Scientific classification
- Kingdom: Animalia
- Phylum: Chordata
- Class: Actinopterygii
- Order: Gobiiformes
- Family: Gobiidae
- Genus: Eviota
- Species: E. melasma

Binomial name
- Eviota melasma Lachner & Karnella, 1980

= Eviota melasma =

Species of fish

Eviota melasma, commonly called headspot eviota or melasma pygmy goby among various other vernacular names, is a species of marine fish in the family Gobiidae.

The headspot eviota has been documented only in Australia; records of the fish elsewhere are thought to be misidentifications. The fish is found on offshore reefs and coastal reefs, just below the tidal zone.

The headspot eviota is a small-sized fish, growing up to 30 millimetres (1.2 in) length. It is a semi-transparent pygmy goby marked with irregular rufous internal bars along the length of its body, with a black spot above the opening of the gills, irregular reddish blotches on its nape, and three reddish blotches which are separated by whitish barring on the belly. It also has a thin white stripe at the base of the pectoral fin.
