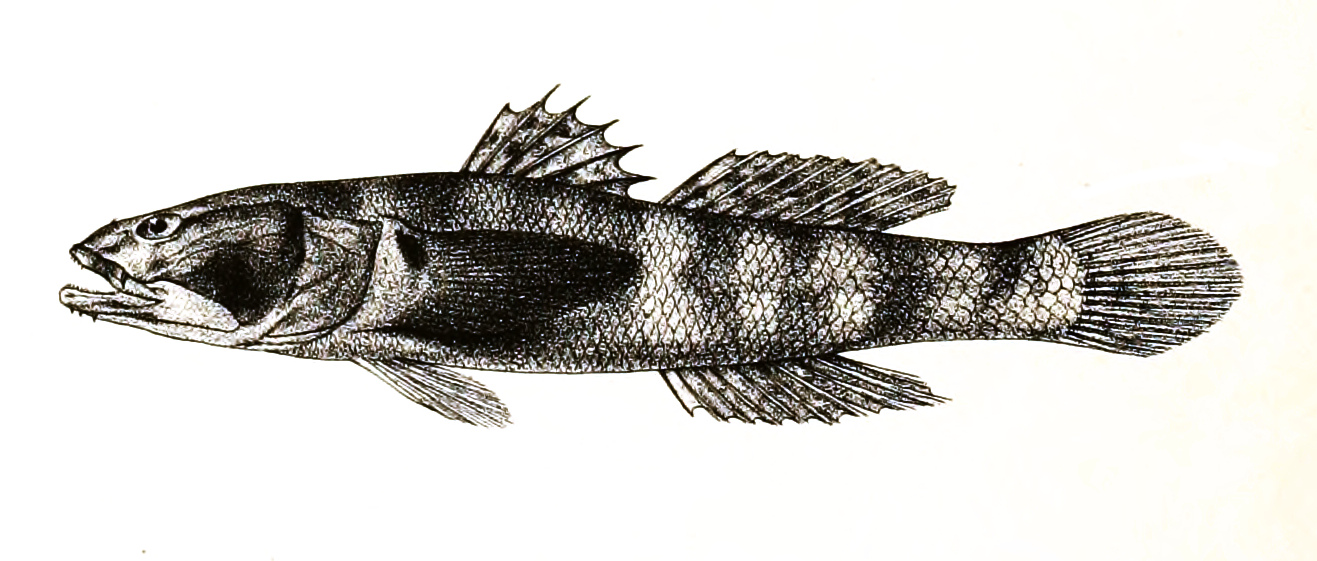
- Gobiopsis macrostoma

Scientific classification
- Kingdom: Animalia
- Phylum: Chordata
- Class: Actinopterygii
- Order: Gobiiformes
- Family: Gobiidae
- Subfamily: Gobiinae
- Genus: Gobiopsis; Steindachner, 1861

Type species
- Gobiopsis macrostomus Steindachner, 1861

= Gobiopsis =

Genus of fishes

Gobiopsis is a genus of fish in the family Gobiidae native to the Indian and Pacific Ocean.

== Species ==
There are currently 15 recognized species in this genus:

- Gobiopsis angustifrons Lachner & McKinney, 1978 (Narrow-nape barbelgoby)
- Gobiopsis arenaria (Snyder, 1908) (Patch-work barbelgoby)
- Gobiopsis atrata (Griffin, 1933) (New Zealand barbelgoby)
- Gobiopsis bravoi (Herre, 1940) (Bravo's barbelgoby)
- Gobiopsis canalis Lachner & McKinney, 1978 (Checkered barbelgoby)
- Gobiopsis exigua Lachner & McKinney, 1979
- Gobiopsis liolepis (Koumans, 1931)
- Gobiopsis macrostoma Steindachner, 1861 (Long-jaw barbelgoby)
- Gobiopsis malekulae (Herre, 1935) (Striped barbelgoby)
- Gobiopsis namnas Shibukawa, 2010
- Gobiopsis pinto (J. L. B. Smith, 1947) (Snake-head barbelgoby)
- Gobiopsis quinquecincta (H. M. Smith, 1931) (Five-band barbelgoby)
- Gobiopsis springeri Lachner & McKinney, 1979 (Springer's barbelgoby)
- Gobiopsis uranophilus Prokofiev, 2016
- Gobiopsis woodsi Lachner & McKinney, 1978 (Woods' barbelgoby)
