= Gobiopsis angustifrons =

Scientific classification
- Kingdom: Animalia
- Phylum: Chordata
- Class: Actinopterygii
- Order: Gobiiformes
- Family: Gobiidae
- Genus: Gobiopsis
- Species: G. angustifrons

Binomial name
- Gobiopsis angustifrons Lachner & McKinney, 1978

Species of fish

Gobiopsis angustifrons, the narrownape barbelgoby, is a species of goby found in the western-central Pacific Ocean from Indonesia, to Australia, and the Solomon Islands.

== Description ==
This species reaches a length of 4.5 cm (1.8 in).
