= Platygobiopsis tansei =

Scientific classification
- Domain: Eukaryota
- Kingdom: Animalia
- Phylum: Chordata
- Class: Actinopterygii
- Order: Gobiiformes
- Family: Gobiidae
- Genus: Platygobiopsis
- Species: P. tansei

Binomial name
- Platygobiopsis tansei Okiyama, 2008

Species of fish

Platygobiopsis tansei is a species of goby found around Japan. This species reaches a length of 4.7 cm (1.9 in).

== Etymology ==
The goby is named for the research vessel Tansei-maru of the Ocean Research Institute, University of Tokyo which is now Japan Marine Science and Technology Center. The ship was involved in collecting many specimens from Suruga Bay, including the type specimen of this goby.
