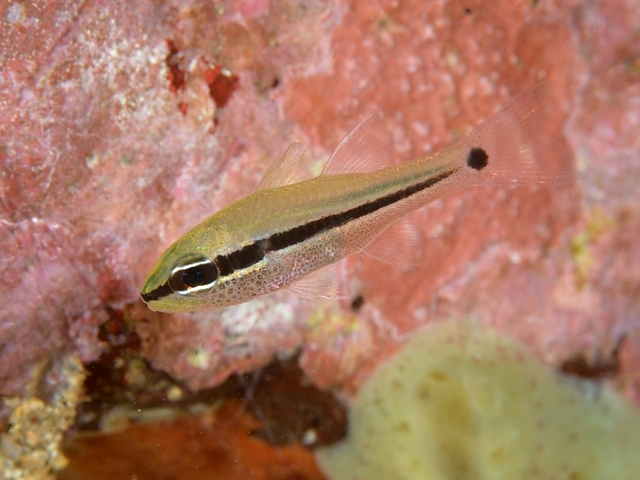
- Pristiapogon fraenatus

Scientific classification
- Kingdom: Animalia
- Phylum: Chordata
- Class: Actinopterygii
- Division: Teleostei
- Order: Gobiiformes
- Family: Apogonidae
- Subfamily: Apogoninae
- Genus: Pristiapogon; Klunzinger, 1870

Type species
- Apogon fraenatus Valenciennes, 1832

= Pristiapogon =

Genus of fishes

Pristiapogon is a genus of cardinalfishes native to the Indian and Pacific Oceans.

== Species ==
The recognized species in this genus are:

- Pristiapogon abrogramma (T. H. Fraser & Lachner, 1985) (lateral-striped cardinalfish)
- Pristiapogon exostigma (D. S. Jordan & Starks, 1906) (narrow-striped cardinalfish)
- Pristiapogon fraenatus (Valenciennes, 1832) (bridled cardinalfish)
- Pristiapogon kallopterus (Bleeker, 1856) (iridescent cardinalfish)
- Pristiapogon menesemus (O. P. Jenkins 1903)
- Pristiapogon taeniopterus (E. T. Bennett, 1836) (bandfin cardinalfish)
- Pristiapogon unitaeniatus (Allen, 1995) (single-striped cardinalfish)
