= Gobiopsis uranophilus =

Scientific classification
- Domain: Eukaryota
- Kingdom: Animalia
- Phylum: Chordata
- Class: Actinopterygii
- Order: Gobiiformes
- Family: Gobiidae
- Genus: Gobiopsis
- Species: G. uranophilus

Binomial name
- Gobiopsis uranophilus Prokofiev, 2016

Species of fish

Gobiopsis uranophilus is a species of goby, which is a type of fish.
