= Eviota fluctiphila =

Conservation status
- Data Deficient (IUCN 3.1)

Scientific classification
- Kingdom: Animalia
- Phylum: Chordata
- Class: Actinopterygii
- Order: Gobiiformes
- Family: Gobiidae
- Genus: Eviota
- Species: E. fluctiphila

Binomial name
- Eviota fluctiphila D. W. Greenfield, Erdmann & Ronald Mambrasar, 2022

Species of fish

Eviota fluctiphila, commonly known as the surge dwarfgoby, is a species of small fish belonging to the family Gobiidae. It was first described by Greenfield, Erdmann, and Mambrasar in 2022.

== Description ==
Eviota fluctiphila is a tiny fish, with females reaching a length of about 14.3 mm (0.56 in). The species is characterized by its dark brown coloration with lighter spots, which provides effective camouflage in its natural habitat. Males display a green coloration.

== Size ==
This species reaches a length of 1.43 cm (0.56 in).

== Habitat and distribution ==
This species is found in the shallow, high-energy reef habitats of West Papua, Indonesia, specifically around Batu Hitam in the Kawe Island group of the Raja Ampat Archipelago. It inhabits areas with depths ranging from 0.2 to 2 metres (1 to 7 ft).

== Behavior and diet ==
Eviota fluctiphila is a nocturnal predator, feeding primarily on small insects, crustaceans, and other aquatic invertebrates. It uses its barbels to detect food in the substrate and is known for its opportunistic feeding habits.

== Conservation status ==
The conservation status of Eviota fluctiphila has not been extensively studied. Due to its limited distribution, the species may be vulnerable to habitat degradation and changes in water quality. Conservation efforts are needed to ensure its long-term survival.

== Human interaction ==
Eviota fluctiphila is not commonly targeted by local fishermen and is primarily of interest to researchers and aquarists. Its presence in the aquarium trade is limited due to its specific habitat requirements.

== Research and studies ==
Further research is needed to fully understand the ecology, behavior, and conservation needs of Eviota fluctiphila. Efforts to study its population dynamics and habitat preferences are crucial for ensuring its long-term survival.
