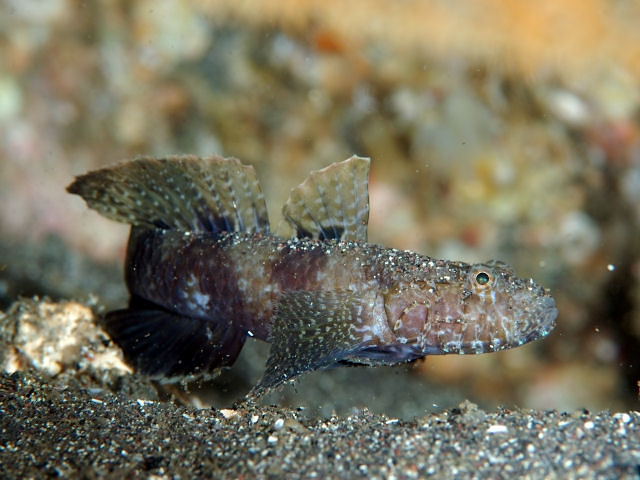

Scientific classification
- Domain: Eukaryota
- Kingdom: Animalia
- Phylum: Chordata
- Class: Actinopterygii
- Order: Gobiiformes
- Family: Gobiidae
- Genus: Callogobius
- Species: C. snelliusi

Binomial name
- Callogobius snelliusi Koumans, 1953

= Callogobius snelliusi =

Species of fish

Callogobius snelliusi is a species of goby found in the western Pacific Ocean from Japan to Indonesia and the eastern coast of northern Australia.

== Description ==
This species reaches a length of 3.3 cm (1.3 in).

== Etymology ==
The fish is named in honor of the Dutch hydrographic research vessel Snellius, which was involved in collecting the type specimen.
