= Gobiopsis malekulae =

Scientific classification
- Domain: Eukaryota
- Kingdom: Animalia
- Phylum: Chordata
- Class: Actinopterygii
- Order: Gobiiformes
- Family: Gobiidae
- Genus: Gobiopsis
- Species: G. malekulae

Binomial name
- Gobiopsis malekulae (Herre, 1935)

Synonyms
- Macgregorella bravoi Herre, 1940

Species of fish

Gobiopsis malekulae, the striped barbelgoby, is a species of goby found in the western-central Pacific Ocean.

== Description ==
This species reaches a length of 3.0 cm (1.2 in).

== Etymology ==
The fish is named in honor of Malekula Island, Vanuatu,.
