= Larsonella =

Conservation status
- Least Concern (IUCN 3.1)

Scientific classification
- Kingdom: Animalia
- Phylum: Chordata
- Class: Actinopterygii
- Division: Teleostei
- Order: Gobiiformes
- Family: Gobiidae
- Genus: Larsonella; J. E. Randall & Senou, 2001
- Species: L. pumila

Binomial name
- Larsonella pumila (Larson & Hoese, 1980)

Synonyms
- Lubricogobius pumilus Larson & Hoese, 1980; Larsonella pumilis (Larson & Hoese, 1980)

Species of fish

Larsonella pumila is a species of goby native to the Indian Ocean from the coast of Africa to the western Pacific Ocean. This species grows to a length of 1.9 centimetres (0.75 in) SL. This species is the only known member of its genus. The specific name honours the ichthyologist Helen K. Larson who was the Curator of Fishes at the Museum and Art Gallery of the Northern Territory in Darwin, for her work on the taxonomy of Indo-Pacific gobies.
