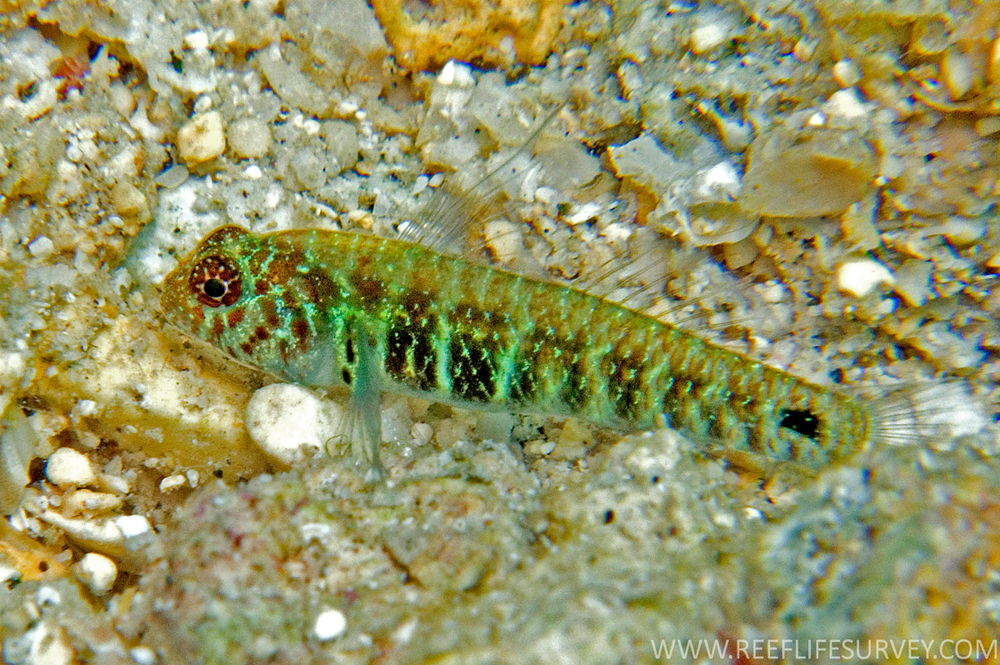

Scientific classification
- Domain: Eukaryota
- Kingdom: Animalia
- Phylum: Chordata
- Class: Actinopterygii
- Order: Gobiiformes
- Family: Gobiidae
- Genus: Eviota
- Species: E. hoesei

Binomial name
- Eviota hoesei A. C. Gill & S. L. Jewett, 2004

= Eviota hoesei =

Species of fish

Eviota hoesei, Doug's eviota, is a species of goby associated with reefs and tide pools. It has a limited distribution in the southwest Pacific, being found around New Caledonia, Lord Howe Island, Norfolk Island and the Elizabeth and Middleton Reefs at depths of from 0 to 25 metres (0 to 82 ft). Within this limited area this is an abundant species.

Like most members of its genus, this is a tiny fish reaching a length of 2 centimetres (0.79 in) SL. Coloration seems to vary with depth: those found near to the surface tend to be green while those found at depths of 18 m or deeper tend to be red. The most prominent diagnostic feature is two dark spots at the base of the pectoral fin.

== Etymology ==
The specific name honours the ichthyologist Douglass Fielding Hoese of the Australian Museum in Sydney who has made an important contribution to the study of fishes in the order Gobiiformes.
