= Eugnathogobius siamensis =

Conservation status
- Least Concern (IUCN 3.1)

Scientific classification
- Kingdom: Animalia
- Phylum: Chordata
- Class: Actinopterygii
- Order: Gobiiformes
- Family: Oxudercidae
- Genus: Eugnathogobius
- Species: E. siamensis

Binomial name
- Eugnathogobius siamensis (Fowler, 1934)

Synonyms
- Vaimosa siamensis Fowler, 1934; Calamiana siamensis (Fowler, 1934); Pseudogobiopsis siamensis (Fowler, 1934); Vaimosa mawaia Herre, 1936; Mugilogobius mawaia (Herre, 1936); Vaimosa jurongensis Herre, 1940; Mugilogobius jurongensis (Herre, 1940); Pseudogobiopsis jurongensis (Herre, 1940); Vaimosa oratai Herre, 1940; Pseudogobius oratai (Herre, 1940); Pseudogobiopsis wuhanlini Zhong & Chen, 1997

Species of fish

Eugnathogobius siamensis is a species of goby.

It has been found in China, Thailand, Malaysia, Singapore, Brunei, and Indonesia.
