= Gobiopsis namnas =

Scientific classification
- Domain: Eukaryota
- Kingdom: Animalia
- Phylum: Chordata
- Class: Actinopterygii
- Order: Gobiiformes
- Family: Gobiidae
- Genus: Gobiopsis
- Species: G. namnas

Binomial name
- Gobiopsis namnas Shibukawa, 2010

Synonyms
- Macgregorella bravoi Herre, 1940

Species of fish

Gobiopsis namnas is a species of goby found in the north-western Pacific Ocean off Japan.

== Description ==
This species reaches a length of 3.2 cm (1.3 in).

== Etymology ==
The fish is named with the abbreviation of National Museum of Nature and Science in Tokyo, Japan, which conducted the deep-water biological survey that collected the type specimens.
