= Eviota vader =

Scientific classification
- Kingdom: Animalia
- Phylum: Chordata
- Class: Actinopterygii
- Order: Gobiiformes
- Family: Gobiidae
- Genus: Eviota
- Species: E. vader

Binomial name
- Eviota vader Erdmann & Ichida, 2025

Species of fish

Eviota vader is a species of marine fish in the family Gobiidae.

== Taxonomy ==
=== Etymology ===
The specific epithet vader refers to Darth Vader from the Star Wars franchise, alluding to the species' exceptionally dark coloration among described dwarfgobies.

== Description ==
Eviota vader is distinguished by its purplish-black coloration, not reported in other species of dwarfgoby. Additional diagnostic features include a complete cephalic sensory-canal pore system, a dorsal/anal fin-ray formula of 8/7, and the presence of a fifth pelvic fin ray. It lacks dark spots on the head and at the bases of the dorsal and caudal fins, and males possess a broad, fringed urogenital papilla. The holotype measures 11.5 mm standard length.

== Habitat and distribution ==
Eviota vader is known only from the volcanic fjord region of Tufi, Papua New Guinea, specifically McLaren Fjord. The holotype was collected at a depth of 4 m from a small burrow on a reef crest. The habitat consists of large Porites and other massive corals, transitioning into branching and foliose corals along a slope descending to 40-50 m depth. The species may occur more broadly in Papua New Guinea, but its full distribution remains unknown.
