= Gobiopsis liolepis =

Scientific classification
- Domain: Eukaryota
- Kingdom: Animalia
- Phylum: Chordata
- Class: Actinopterygii
- Order: Gobiiformes
- Family: Gobiidae
- Genus: Gobiopsis
- Species: G. liolepis

Binomial name
- Gobiopsis liolepis (Koumans, 1931)

Species of fish

Gobiopsis liolepis is a species of goby, a type of fish.
