= Gobiopsis pinto =

Conservation status
- Least Concern (IUCN 3.1)

Scientific classification
- Kingdom: Animalia
- Phylum: Chordata
- Class: Actinopterygii
- Order: Gobiiformes
- Family: Gobiidae
- Genus: Gobiopsis
- Species: G. pinto

Binomial name
- Gobiopsis pinto (J. L. B. Smith, 1947)

Synonyms
- Abranches pinto Smith, 1947

Species of fish

Gobiopsis pinto, the snakehead goby, is a species of goby found in the western Indian Ocean.

== Description ==
This species reaches a length of 6.5 cm (2.6 in).

== Etymology ==
The fish is named in honor of Adolfo Abranches Pinto (1895–1981), the Military Commander of Mozambique, where this goby is endemic.
