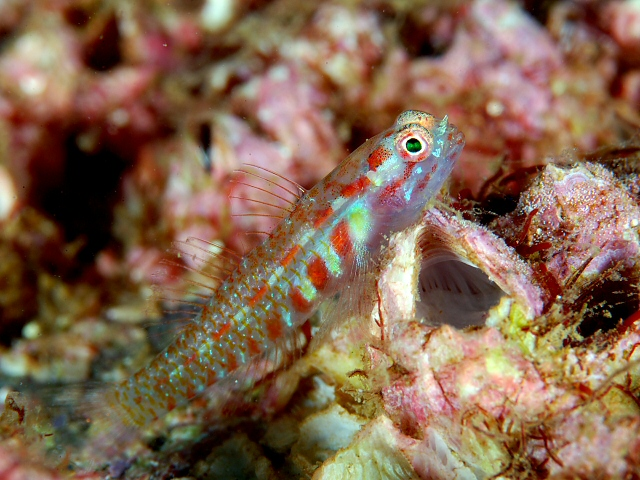

Scientific classification
- Kingdom: Animalia
- Phylum: Chordata
- Class: Actinopterygii
- Order: Gobiiformes
- Family: Gobiidae
- Genus: Eviota
- Species: E. albolineata

Binomial name
- Eviota albolineata Jewett & Lachner, 1983

= Eviota albolineata =

Species of fish

Eviota albolineata, commonly called spotted fringefin goby or whitelined eviota among various other vernacular names, is a species of marine fish in the family Gobiidae.

This species is restricted to the Society Islands, Line Islands and Tuamotu Archipelago, records elsewhere are thought to refer to misidentifications of Eviota guttata, a very similar species to E. albolineata.

The spotted fringefin goby is a small sized fish, it can grow up to a size from 19 and 26 millimetres (1.0 in) length.
