= Eviota readerae =

Scientific classification
- Domain: Eukaryota
- Kingdom: Animalia
- Phylum: Chordata
- Class: Actinopterygii
- Order: Gobiiformes
- Family: Gobiidae
- Genus: Eviota
- Species: E. readerae

Binomial name
- Eviota readerae A. C. Gill & S. L. Jewett 2004

Species of fish

Eviota readerae is a species of goby associated with reefs and tide pools. It has a very limited distribution in the southwest Pacific, being found only on the Elizabeth and Middleton Reefs and the Lord Howe Rise in the Tasman Sea.

Like most members of its genus, this is a tiny fish, the standard length never exceeding 18 mm. This is a pale species with a series of dark marks along the back. In juveniles these marks extend down below the midline, gradually being reduced to much smaller dark saddles in mature specimens. There is also a single black spot at the base of the pectoral fin.

== Etymology ==
The specific name honours the ichthyologist Sally E. Reader of the Australian Museum in Sydney who helped Anthony Gill with the collection of many of the type specimens, as well as arranging the loan of specimens from the museum for his study.
