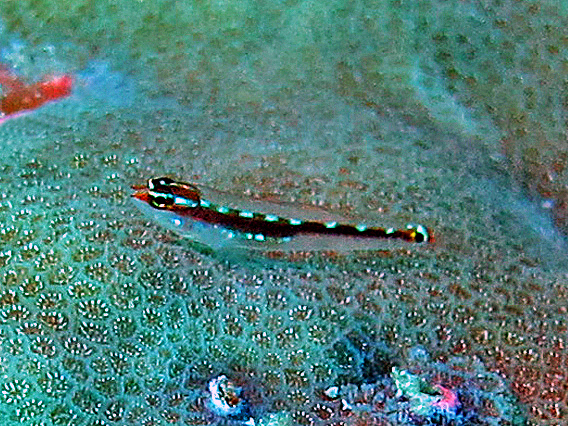
- Eviota sebreei from Maldives

Conservation status
- Least Concern (IUCN 3.1)

Scientific classification
- Kingdom: Animalia
- Phylum: Chordata
- Class: Actinopterygii
- Order: Gobiiformes
- Family: Gobiidae
- Genus: Eviota
- Species: E. sebreei

Binomial name
- Eviota sebreei D. S. Jordan & Seale, 1906

Synonyms
- Eviota seebreei Jordan & Seale, 1906; Eviota seebrei Jordan & Seale, 1906

= Eviota sebreei =

Species of fish

Eviota sebreei, common name Sebree's pygmy goby or striped dwarfgoby, is a species of fishes belonging to the family Gobiidae.

== Etymology ==
The fish is named in honor of Capt. Uriel Sebree (1848-1922), of the U.S. Navy, he was commandant at the U.S. Naval Station Tutuila in American Samoa, and through whom the gunboat Wheeling and its equipment were placed at the describers disposal.

== Distribution ==
This species is widespread and common throughout the Indo-Pacific Ocean, from the Red Sea, Persian Gulf and Madagascar east to Marshall Islands, Tonga and Samoa and north to southern Japan, south to Western Australia, Queensland and New Caledonia.

== Habitat ==
These tropical marine neritic fishes are associated with clear waters coral reef, at depths of 0 to 30 m.

== Description ==
Eviota sebreei can reach a body length of about 25 mm (0.98 in). This species has six dorsal spines, 8-10 dorsal soft rays, one anal spine and 8-9 anal soft rays. The dorsal/anal-fin formula is 9/8. The fifth pelvic-fin ray is about 50-80% of the fourth ray. These fishes are characterized by a reddish longitudinal stripe in the mid-body, with a broken white line and some white spots The pectoral rays are unbranched. On the caudal fin base there is a pale-edged black spot.

== Biology and behavior ==
These fishes usually perch on live coral of lagoon reefs and on reef-slopes, sometimes in company of some other fishes of the same species.

== Bibliography ==
- Greenfield, D. W.; Randall, J. E. (2016). A review of the dwarfgobies of Fiji, including descriptions of five new species (Teleostei: Gobiidae: Eviota). Zenodo.
- Liu, J.Y. [Ruiyu] (ed.). (2008). Checklist of marine biota of China seas. China Science Press. 1267 pp.
- Myers, R.F. (1991) Micronesian reef fishes., Second Ed. Coral Graphics, Barrigada, Guam. 298 p.
- Randall, J.E. and M. Goren (1993) A review of the gobioid fishes of the Maldives., Ichthyol. Bull. J. L. B. Smith Inst. Ichthyol. (58):1-37, 5 pls.
