= Gobiopsis quinquecincta =

Conservation status
- Least Concern (IUCN 3.1)

Scientific classification
- Kingdom: Animalia
- Phylum: Chordata
- Class: Actinopterygii
- Order: Gobiiformes
- Family: Gobiidae
- Genus: Gobiopsis
- Species: G. quinquecincta

Binomial name
- Gobiopsis quinquecincta (H. M. Smith, 1931)

Synonyms
- Pipidonia quinquecincta Smith, 1931; Papidonia quinquecinta Smith, 1931

Species of fish

Gobiopsis quinquecincta, the fiveband barbelgoby, is a species of goby found in the Indo-West Pacific and Asia areas.

== Size ==
This species reaches a length of 2.4 cm (0.94 in).
