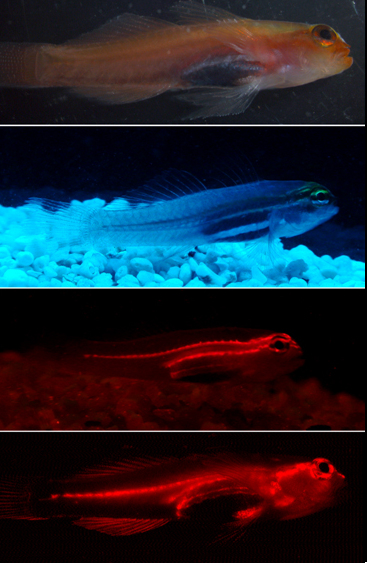
- Eviota pellucida under four viewing conditions

Conservation status
- Least Concern (IUCN 3.1)

Scientific classification
- Kingdom: Animalia
- Phylum: Chordata
- Class: Actinopterygii
- Order: Gobiiformes
- Family: Gobiidae
- Genus: Eviota
- Species: E. pellucida

Binomial name
- Eviota pellucida Larson, 1976

= Eviota pellucida =

Species of fish

Eviota pellucida, commonly called neon pygmy goby or pellucida pygmy goby, is a species of marine fish in the family Gobiidae.

== Description ==
It reaches a maximum size of 21 millimetres (0.83 in) in length. Its body is a transparent orange/red colour, with a yellow/gold line stretching from its head the base of its tail, one on its side stretching through its eye to 2/3 of the way down its body, and two lines over its head. All lines originate near the upper lip. A white line along the stomach is also present.

== Distribution ==
The Neon pygmy goby is widespread throughout the tropical waters of the Pacific Ocean and has been recorded from the Ryukyu Islands, Pohnpei, Guam, Marshall Islands and Abaiang Atoll in Kiribati records elsewhere represent Eviota atriventris.

It can be found at depths of 3–30 metres (98 ft).

== Behavior ==
Sticking to lagoonal areas with much shelter, these fishes are often found in groups, browsing for microinvertebrates (and seeking refuge) among the branches of small-polyped stony corals, as well as sometimes cleaning parasites and dead tissues from larger fish.

== Captivity ==
Occasionally making its way into the aquarium trade, this is a hardy little specimen. Its diet in captivity consists of small invertebrates including copepods and amphipod larvae, and they may occasionally be seen clearing other fish of parasites and dead tissues. They will sometimes accept pelleted foods and often frozen foods like mysis shrimp. An environment that is branchy or with many perches is most suitable, and SPS will often be enjoyed as a home. Macroalgaes and porous rock will provide much enjoyable browsing for these fish.
