= Gobiopsis bravoi =

Scientific classification
- Domain: Eukaryota
- Kingdom: Animalia
- Phylum: Chordata
- Class: Actinopterygii
- Order: Gobiiformes
- Family: Gobiidae
- Genus: Gobiopsis
- Species: G. bravoi

Binomial name
- Gobiopsis bravoi (Herre, 1940)

Synonyms
- Macgregorella bravoi Herre, 1940

Species of fish

Gobiopsis bravoi, or Bravo's bearded goby, is a species of goby found in the western Pacific Ocean from the Philippines, Irian Jaya, and possibly Okinawa, Ryukyu Islands and Palau.

== Description ==
This species reaches a length of 4.1 cm (1.6 in).

== Etymology ==
The fish is named in honor of Pablo Bravo, Herre's illustrator for many years.
