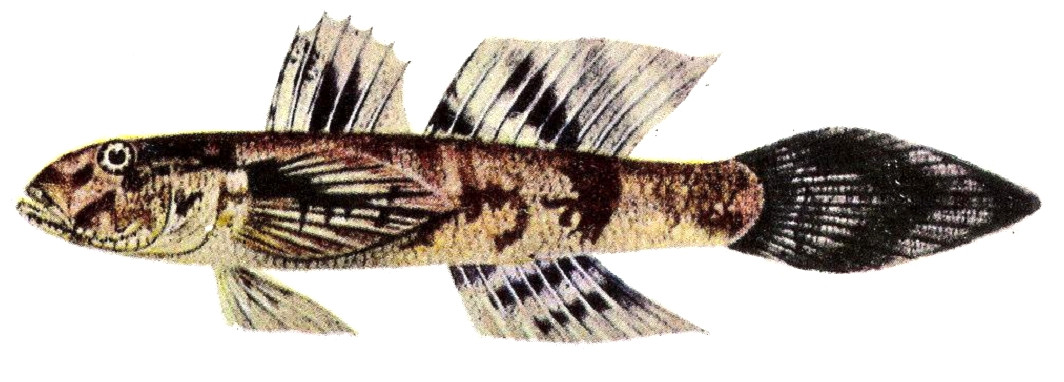
- Callogobius hasseltii

Scientific classification
- Kingdom: Animalia
- Phylum: Chordata
- Class: Actinopterygii
- Order: Gobiiformes
- Family: Gobiidae
- Subfamily: Gobiinae
- Genus: Callogobius; Bleeker, 1874

Type species
- Eleotris hasseltii Bleeker, 1851

= Callogobius =

Genus of fishes

Callogobius is a genus of fish in the family Gobiidae found in brackish and marine waters of the Indian and Pacific Ocean.

These small gobies are distinguished by ridges of papillae on their heads.

== Species ==
The circumscription of the genus is unclear, but there are 41 species in the genus as it is currently known. Species include:

- Callogobius albipunctatus Akihito & Ikeda, 2021
- Callogobius amikami Goren, Miroz & Baranes, 1991
- Callogobius andamanensis Menon & Chatterjee, 1974 (Andaman flap-headed goby)
- Callogobius aquilus Li & Chen, 2024
- Callogobius bauchotae Goren, 1979 (Bauchot's flap-headed goby)
- Callogobius bifasciatus (J. L. B. Smith, 1958) (Double-bar flap-headed goby)
- Callogobius bothriorrhynchus (Herzenstein, 1896)
- Callogobius centrolepis M. C. W. Weber, 1909 (Centre-scale flap-headed goby)
- Callogobius clarki (Goren, 1978)
- Callogobius clitellus McKinney & Lachner, 1978 (Saddled flap-headed goby)
- Callogobius crassus McKinney & Lachner, 1984 (Stout flap-headed goby)
- Callogobius depressus (E. P. Ramsay & J. D. Ogilby, 1886) (Flap-headed goby)
- Callogobius dori Goren, 1980
- Callogobius dorsomaculatus Akihito & Ikeda, 2021
- Callogobius falx Fujiwara, Suzuki & Motomura, 2021
- Callogobius flavobrunneus (J. L. B. Smith, 1958) (Slimy flap-headed goby)
- Callogobius hasseltii (Bleeker, 1851) (Hasselt's flap-headed goby)
- Callogobius hastatus McKinney & Lachner, 1978 (Spear-fin flap-headed goby)
- Callogobius irrasus (J. L. B. Smith, 1959)
- Callogobius kuderi (Herre, 1943)
- Callogobius maculipinnis (Fowler, 1918) (Ostrich flap-headed goby)
- Callogobius mannarensis K. Rangarajan, 1970
- Callogobius mucosus (Günther, 1872) (Sculptured flap-headed goby)
- Callogobius nigromarginatus J. P. Chen & K. T. Shao, 2000
- Callogobius okinawae (Snyder, 1908) (Okinawa flap-headed goby)
- Callogobius pilosimentum Delventhal, Mooi, Bogorodsky & A. O. Mal, 2016 (Hairy-chinned flap-headed goby)
- Callogobius plumatus (J. L. B. Smith, 1959) (Feather flap-headed goby)
- Callogobius productus (Herre, 1927) (Elongate flap-headed goby)
- Callogobius sclateri (Steindachner, 1879) (Pacific flap-headed goby)
- Callogobius sheni I. S. Chen, J. P. Chen & L. S. Fang, 2006
- Callogobius shunkan Takagi, 1957
- Callogobius snelliusi Koumans, 1953
- Callogobius snyderi (Fowler, 1946)
- Callogobius stellatus McKinney & Lachner, 1978 (Stellar flap-headed goby)
- Callogobius swifti Gerald R. Allen, Mark V. Erdmann & William M. Brooks, 2020
- Callogobius tanegasimae (Snyder, 1908)
- Callogobius trifasciatus Menon & Chatterjee, 1976
- Callogobius tutuilae (D. S. Jordan & Seale, 1906)
- Callogobius vanclevei (Herre, 1950)
- Callogobius williamsi Delventhal & Mooi, 2023
- Callogobius winterbottomi Delventhal and Mooi, 2013 (Winterbottom's flap-headed goby)
