= Tombigbee darter =

Conservation status
- Least Concern (IUCN 3.1)

Scientific classification
- Kingdom: Animalia
- Phylum: Chordata
- Class: Actinopterygii
- Order: Perciformes
- Family: Percidae
- Genus: Etheostoma
- Species: E. lachneri

Binomial name
- Etheostoma lachneri Suttkus & R. M. Bailey, 1994

Species of fish

The Tombigbee darter (Etheostoma lachneri) is a species of freshwater ray-finned fish, a darter from the subfamily Etheostomatinae, part of the family Percidae, which also contains the perches, ruffes and pikeperches. It is endemic to the eastern United States, where it occurs in the Tombigbee River system in northeastern Mississippi and Alabama. It inhabits sand- and rock-bottomed pools of headwaters, creeks, and small rivers, and small streams with mixed sand-gravel substrate, and creeks with mixed sand, gravel, and hard clay or bedrock substrate. The Tombigbee darter was first formally described in 1994 by Royal Dallas Suttkus and Reeve Maclaren Bailey with the type locality given as Wolf Creek, a tributary to the Little Souwilpa Creek near Alabama State Route 17 in Choctaw County, Alabama.

== Etymology ==
The specific name honors the American ichthyologist Ernest A. Lachner (1915–1996).
