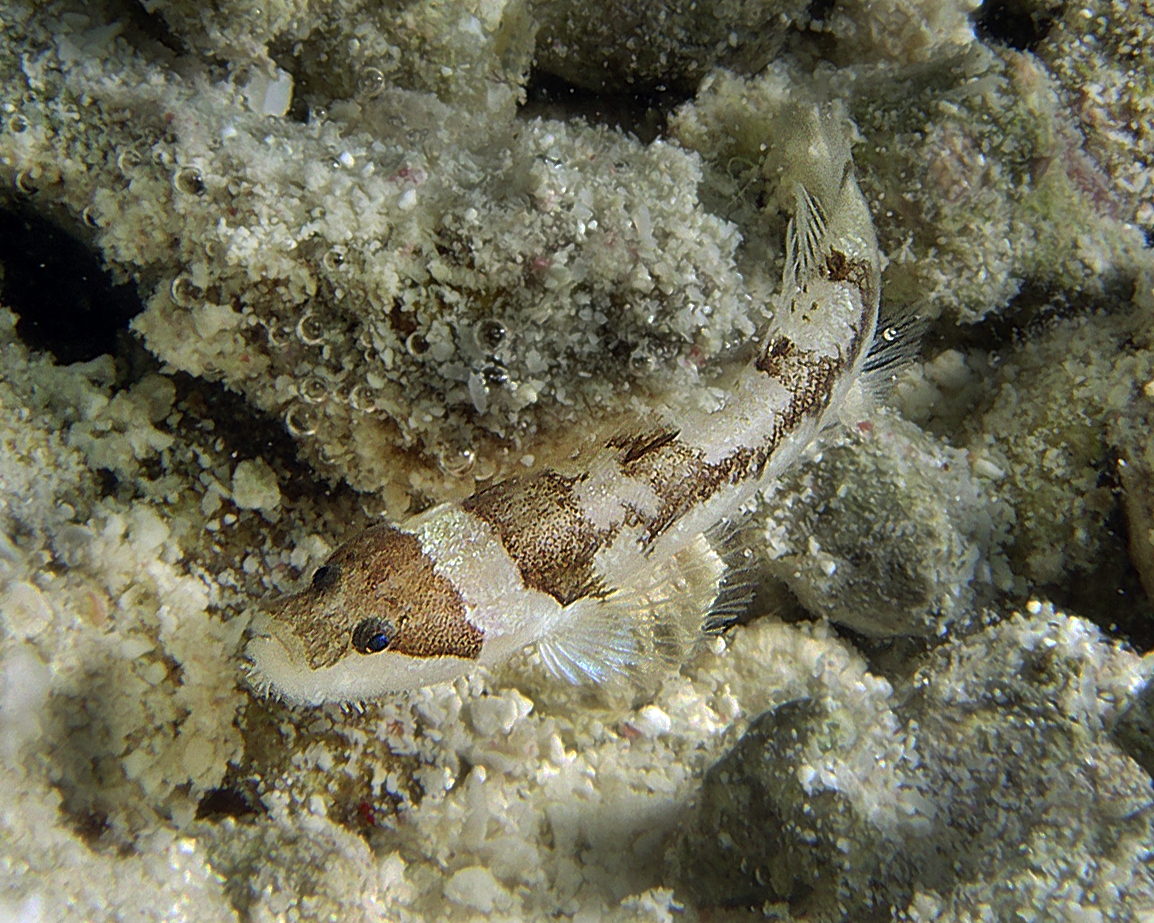

Scientific classification
- Domain: Eukaryota
- Kingdom: Animalia
- Phylum: Chordata
- Class: Actinopterygii
- Order: Gobiiformes
- Family: Gobiidae
- Genus: Gobiopsis
- Species: G. arenaria

Binomial name
- Gobiopsis arenaria (Snyder, 1908)

Synonyms
- Hetereleotris arenarius Snyder, 1908

= Gobiopsis arenaria =

Species of fish

Gobiopsis arenaria, the patchwork barbelgoby, is a species of goby found in the Indo-West Pacific from Japan south to Australia.

== Description ==
This species reaches a length of 1.6 cm (0.63 in).
