= Platygobiopsis akihito =

Scientific classification
- Domain: Eukaryota
- Kingdom: Animalia
- Phylum: Chordata
- Class: Actinopterygii
- Order: Gobiiformes
- Family: Gobiidae
- Genus: Platygobiopsis
- Species: P. akihito

Binomial name
- Platygobiopsis akihito V. G. Springer & J. E. Randall, 1992

Species of goby

Platygobiopsis akihito, or the Imperial goby, is a species of goby known only from the area of Flores, Indonesia. This species reaches a length of 13 cm (5.1 in).

== Etymology ==
The goby is named for Emeritus Emperor Akihito of Japan (b. 1933), honoring his contribution to the expansion of knowledge of gobioid fishes.
