= Eviota mikiae =

Scientific classification
- Kingdom: Animalia
- Phylum: Chordata
- Class: Actinopterygii
- Order: Gobiiformes
- Family: Gobiidae
- Genus: Eviota
- Species: E. mikiae

Binomial name
- Eviota mikiae (G. R. Allen, 2001)

Species of fish

Eviota mikiae, commonly called Miki's pygmy-goby or white-line eviota among various other vernacular names, is a species of marine fish in the family Gobiidae.

== Etymology ==
The fish is named in honor of Miki Tonozuka of Bali, Indonesia, for her assistance in the field during the Weh Island survey, during which the type specimen was collected.

== Distribution ==
The Miki's pygmy-goby is widespread throughout the tropical waters of the Indian Ocean.

== Size ==
This pygmy goby is a small sized fish. It can grow up to a size of 35 millimetres (1.4 in) length.
