= Platygobiopsis dispar =

Scientific classification
- Domain: Eukaryota
- Kingdom: Animalia
- Phylum: Chordata
- Class: Actinopterygii
- Order: Gobiiformes
- Family: Gobiidae
- Genus: Platygobiopsis
- Species: P. dispar

Binomial name
- Platygobiopsis dispar Prokofiev, 2008

Species of goby

Platygobiopsis dispar is a species of goby known only from the area off central Vietnam in the South China Sea. This species reaches a length of 6.5 cm (2.6 in).
