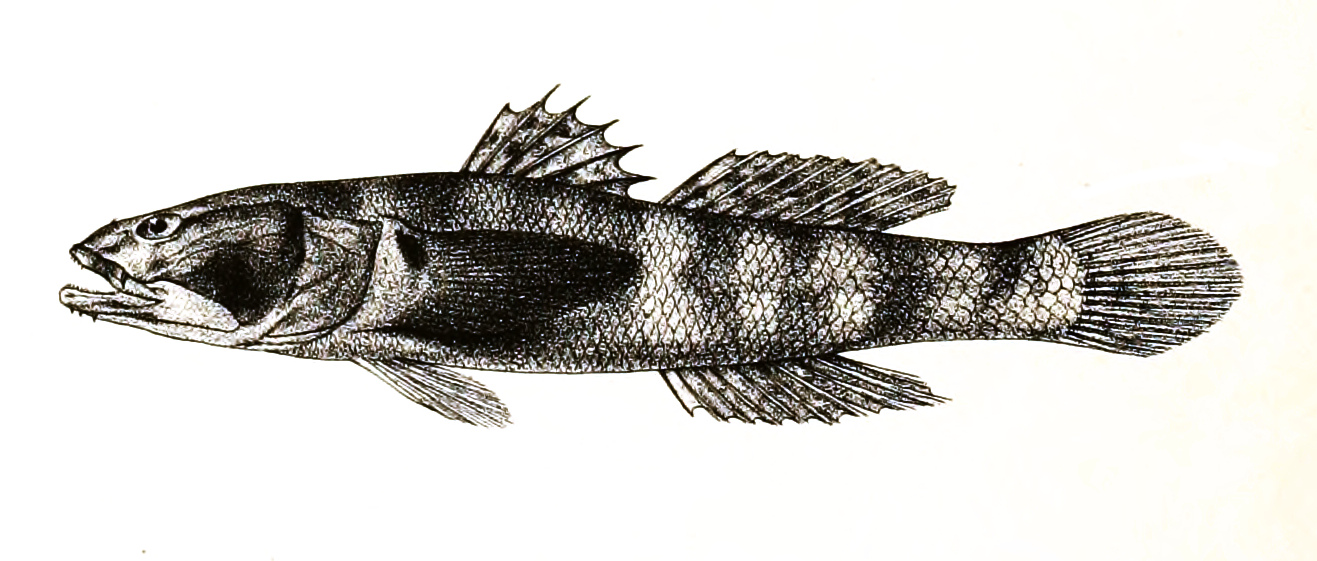

Conservation status
- Least Concern (IUCN 3.1)

Scientific classification
- Kingdom: Animalia
- Phylum: Chordata
- Class: Actinopterygii
- Order: Gobiiformes
- Family: Gobiidae
- Genus: Gobiopsis
- Species: G. macrostoma

Binomial name
- Gobiopsis macrostoma Steindachner, 1861

= Gobiopsis macrostoma =

Species of fish

Gobiopsis macrostoma, also known as longjaw goby and lockjaw goby, is a species of goby found in the Indo-West Pacific from western India to the Mekong River.

== Description ==
This species reaches a length of 10.0 cm (3.9 in).
