= Gobiopsis exigua =

Conservation status
- Least Concern (IUCN 3.1)

Scientific classification
- Kingdom: Animalia
- Phylum: Chordata
- Class: Actinopterygii
- Order: Gobiiformes
- Family: Gobiidae
- Genus: Gobiopsis
- Species: G. exigua

Binomial name
- Gobiopsis exigua Lachner & McKinney, 1979

Synonyms
- Myctophum fulgens A. B. Brauer, 1904

Species of fish

Gobiopsis exigua is a species of goby found in the western-central Pacific Ocean.
