= Eviota susanae =

Scientific classification
- Kingdom: Animalia
- Phylum: Chordata
- Class: Actinopterygii
- Division: Teleostei
- Order: Gobiiformes
- Family: Gobiidae
- Genus: Eviota
- Species: E. susanae

Binomial name
- Eviota susanae Greenfield & Randall, 1999

Species of goby

Eviota susanae, the Susan's dwarfgoby, is a species of ray-finned fish from the family Gobiidae, the "true gobies".
