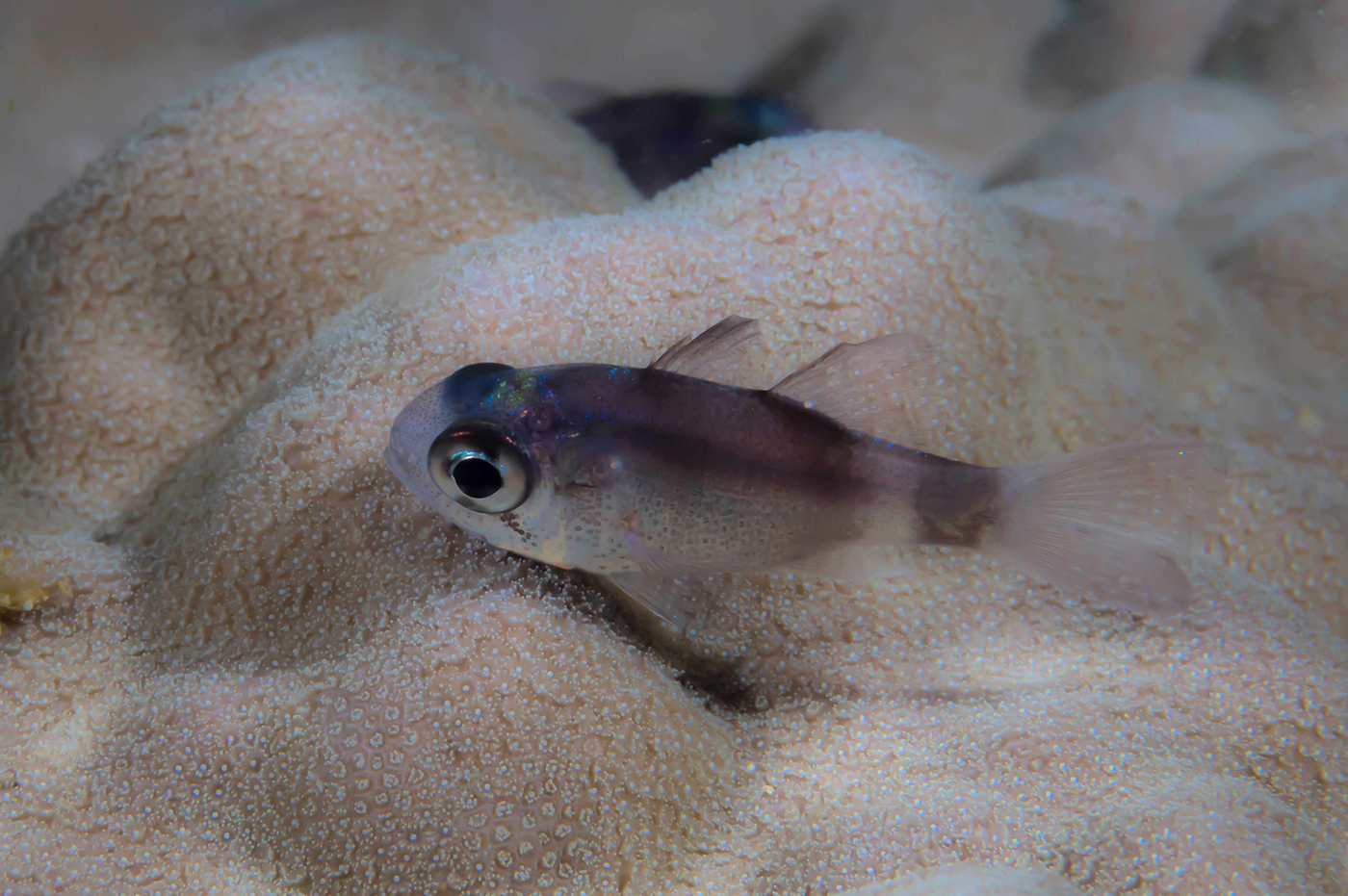

Conservation status
- Least Concern (IUCN 3.1)

Scientific classification
- Kingdom: Animalia
- Phylum: Chordata
- Class: Actinopterygii
- Division: Teleostei
- Order: Gobiiformes
- Family: Apogonidae
- Genus: Nectamia
- Species: N. fusca

Binomial name
- Nectamia fusca (Quoy & Gaimard, 1825)

Synonyms
- Apogon fuscus Quoy & Gaimard, 1825; Ostorhinchus fuscus (Quoy & Gaimard, 1825); Apogon guamensis Valenciennes, 1832; Ostorhinchus guamensis (Valenciennes, 1832); Apogon nubilos Garman, 1903; Apogon ocellatus Fourmanoir & Crosnier, 1964; Ostorhynchus spongicolus J. L. B. Smith, 1965

= Nectamia fusca =

Species of fish

Nectamia fusca, the ghost cardinalfish, dusky cardinalfish, Guam cardinalfish, pearl cardinalfish ot three-saddled cardinalfish, is a species of marine ray-finned fish belonging to the family Apogonidae, the cardinalfishes. This cardinalfish is found in the Indian and Pacific Oceans.

== Taxonomy ==
Nectamia fusca was first formally described as Apogon fuscus in 1825 by the French naturalists and explorers Jean René Constant Quoy and Joseph Paul Gaimard with its type locality given as Guam in the Mariana Islands. In 1917 David Starr Jordan described the genus Nectamia with Apogon fuscus as its type species by monotypy. This genus is placed in the tribe Sphaeramiini, which contains five other genera, within the subfamily Apogoninae. The family Apogonidae is in the suborder Apogonoidei in the order Gobiiformes.

== Etymology ==
Nectamia fusca is the type species of the genus Nectamia, a name which Jordan did not explain. It prefixes Amia, a non binomial name originally coined by Laurens Theodorus Gronovius for the genus Apogon which is now used as a common suffix for genus names within the cardinalfish family, with nect- may be derived from the Greek nḗktēs, which means "swimmer". however the fishes in this genus are not very strong swimmers. The specific name fusca, means "dusky", "dark" or "swarthy", an allusion to the brown colour of this fish's body.

== Description ==
Nectamia fusca reaches a total length of 11.2 cm (4.4 in). The first dorsal fin contains 7 spines, the second dorsal fin has a single spine and 9 soft rays and the anal fin has 2 spines and 8 soft rays. The head and body are bronzy to brownish and may have indistinct bars, there are no stripes on body or fins. The cheek has a dark marking which is uniformally slender to the near angle of preopercle; there is a yellowish mark under the eye. The first dorsal fin has dusky membranes between the second and fourth spines and the other fins are pale. There is a diffuse spt or bar on the caudal peduncle which is mainly above the lateral line.

== Distribution and habitat ==
Nectamia fusca has a wide Indo-Pacific distribution; in the Western Indin Ocean it is found along the eastern African coast from the Red Sea to Mozambique, through Madagascar, Comoro Islands, Mascarenes, Chagos Archipelago, Maldives and India, but not the Seychelles. Fae=trther east it is found in Indonesia, Ryukyu Islands, Mariana Islands, northern Australia, New Caledonia, Line Islands and Tuamotu Islands. It is found at depths between 6 and 14 m (20 and 46 ft) on outer-reef slopes, sheltering among corals by day and feeds on free-swimming invertebrates at night.
