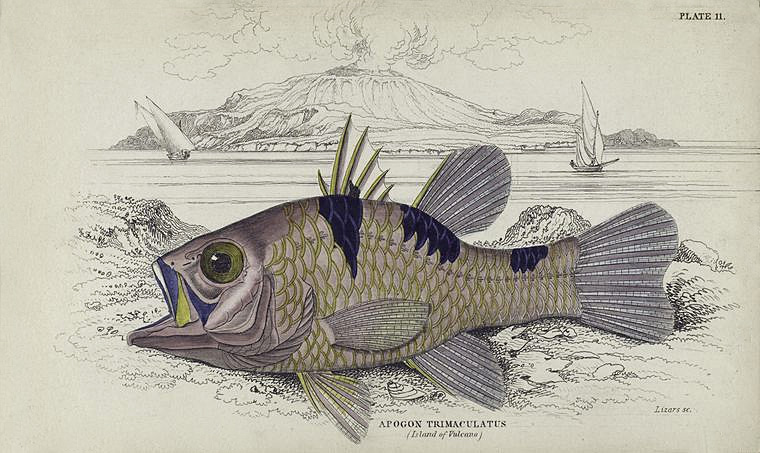
- Pristicon trimaculatus

Scientific classification
- Kingdom: Animalia
- Phylum: Chordata
- Class: Actinopterygii
- Order: Gobiiformes
- Family: Apogonidae
- Subfamily: Apogoninae
- Genus: Pristicon; T. H. Fraser, 1972

Type species
- Apogon trimaculatus Cuvier, 1828

= Pristicon =

Genus of fishes

Pristicon is a genus of cardinalfishes native to the western Pacific Ocean.

== Species ==
The recognized species in this genus are:

- Pristicon rhodopterus (Bleeker, 1852) (redfin cardinalfish)
- Pristicon rufus (J. E. Randall & T. H. Fraser, 1999) (rufous cardinalfish)
- Pristicon trimaculatus (G. Cuvier, 1828) (three-spot cardinalfish)
