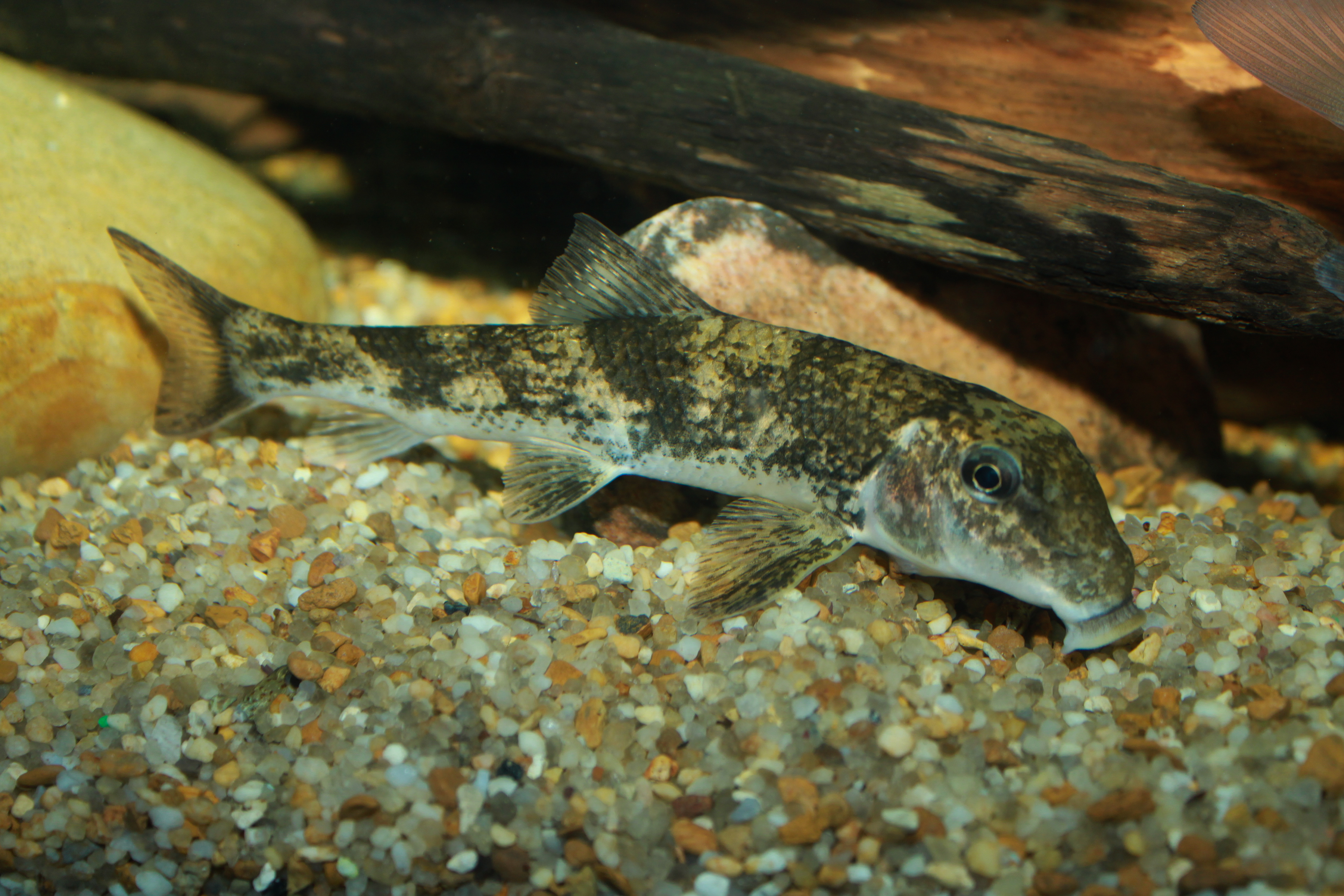

Conservation status
- Least Concern (IUCN 3.1)

Scientific classification
- Kingdom: Animalia
- Phylum: Chordata
- Class: Actinopterygii
- Division: Teleostei
- Order: Cypriniformes
- Family: Catostomidae
- Genus: Hypentelium
- Species: H. nigricans

Binomial name
- Hypentelium nigricans (Lesueur, 1817)

Synonyms
- Catostomus nigricans Lesueur, 1817

= Northern hogsucker =

Species of fish

The northern hogsucker (Hypentelium nigricans) is a freshwater ray-finned fish belonging to the family Catostomidae, the suckers. It is native to the United States and Canada where it is found in streams and rivers. It prefers clear, fast-flowing water, where it can forage on the riverbed for crustaceans, mollusks, aquatic insects, algae and detritus. It turns over small pebbles and scrapes materials off rocks and sucks up the particles, and other species of fish sometimes station themselves downstream from its activities. Breeding takes place on gravel bottoms in shallow riffles in late spring. This fish is susceptible to such man-made disturbances as channelization, sedimentation, pollution, and dam construction. However, it has a wide range and is a common species so the International Union for Conservation of Nature has rated its conservation status as being of "least concern".

== Distribution ==
A small Northern Hogsucker caught and released in the Huron River of Southeast Michigan

The northern hogsucker is native to southern Canada and much of the eastern and southern United States. It lives in the rivers of the Mississippi River Basin, its range extending from Oklahoma and Alabama northward to Minnesota. It is present in the Great Lakes and rivers of the mid-Atlantic region. Its current range is similar to its historical distribution, except in western areas, where it has experienced some extirpations. Habitat disturbance due to agricultural practices in states such as South Dakota, Iowa, Missouri, Kansas, and Oklahoma have contributed to the extirpation events.

Males can reach sexual maturity in their second season, while females usually do not reach maturity until their third year. Specimens in smaller streams are smaller and take longer to mature. H. nigricans may reach up to 33 cm (13 in) by the end of its fifth growing season. Exceptionally large specimens of this species are usually female. The maximum life span is about eleven years.

== Ecology ==
The fish can be found in or next to riffle areas in warm water, medium-sized creeks and small rivers. It can also occur in cold water streams, tiny creeks and large rivers and on occasion in reservoirs. Its diet mainly consists of insect larvae, crustaceans, mollusks, diatoms, and bits of vegetation. While feeding, it scrapes of the top surface of rubble, turns over stones on the bottom, and sucks the loosened material which contains a variety of small organisms. As it feeds, other fish, such as shiners and smallmouth bass position themselves downstream to feed on the free-flowing materials the hogsucker roots up.

Predators of the northern hogsucker typically vary depending on the environment. During its early years in shallow, fast-moving streams it can fall prey to piscivorous species. Later in life, it is typically one of the larger species in the waterways. In the northern tier of its range, it lives in deeper streams and lakes and are sought by large predatory fish, such as muskellunge and northern pike.

Sometimes it competes with other sucker species and redhorse for breeding habitat. During the egg-laying process, daces, minnows, and chubs will sometimes forage on the freshly expelled eggs.

Spawning takes place in shallow water riffles usually during May, when the water temperature is about 15 °C (59 °F). Breeding males will congregate over these gravel areas where each receptive female may be courted by several males. The spawning activity is violent, and shallow depressions are formed in the gravel from the commotion. The eggs are non-adhesive and settle on the gravel. Young-of-the-year and fry swim in schools and prefer shallower environments (<30 cm) than adult members of their species.

== Relationship with humans ==
Although the species is not currently found on any state or federal threatened and endangered listings, it is still susceptible to the manmade influences that have affected other freshwater fish species. Channelization, sedimentation, pollution, and dam construction always have the potential to alter populations of the species. Lack of suitable spawning habitat could be a detriment in the future and should be monitored closely. Sedimentation degrades living and breeding habitat within the streams. Changes in the temperature of streams as result of urban runoff can prove to be a problem for their habitats H. nigricans can be found in national and state parks throughout its range, the largest being the Great Smoky Mountains National Park. It is common throughout all streams in the park up to 2,800 feet (850 m) in elevation. It is protected in park habitat. The hogsucker is not a threatened species. It is sympatric with threatened species, however, and efforts to conserve these have benefitted the hogsucker. The northern hogsucker is common throughout most of its wide range. No particular threats have been identified and the International Union for Conservation of Nature has assessed its conservation status as being of "least concern". The IGFA world record for northern hogsucker is 1.47 kg (3 lb 4 oz) with the fish being caught near St Cloud, Minnesota in 2023.
