= Helen K. Larson =

Australian ichthyologist

- Education: University of Guam; University of Queensland
- Scientific career
- Workplaces: Australian Museum; Museum and Art Gallery Northern Territory
- Thesis: A revision of the gobiid fish genus Mugilogobius (Teleostei: Gobioidei), and its systematic placement

Helen K. Larson is an Australian ichthyologist who specialises in the fishes of the Indo-Pacific.

In the 1960s and 1970s, she attended the University of Guam to study for her Bachelor's and master's degrees and while there she also worked in the local Marine Laboratory. While there she collected and described a new species of the dwarf goby from the genus Eviota, Eviota pellucida, the description being published in 1976 in the journal Copeia. This was her first description of a new species. Her Masters was called Notes on the biology and comparative behaviour of Eviota zonura and Eviota smaragdus (Pisces:Gobiidae). She gained a PhD in Zoology from the University of Queensland and her thesis was A revision of the gobiid fish genus Mugilogobius (Teleostei: Gobioidei), and its systematic placement.

She moved from Guam in 1974 to work with Douglass F. Hoese at the Australian Museum in Sydney as a Technical Officer and in 1981 she took a position as Curator of Fishes at the Museum and Art Gallery Northern Territory in Darwin. She held this position until she retired in 2009.

Her main interests were in the fishes of the Indo-Pacific, especially the Gobiiformes and she is the author or co-author of over 120 papers. Over the course of her career she has described 72 new species and name 7 new genera. She is on the editorial board of the academic journals Ichthyological Exploration of Freshwaters and aqua, International Journal of Ichthyology. She also reviews papers for a number of other journals. As well as gobies Larson's interests include river sharks, freshwater hardyheads, freshwater grunters, damsel fishes and mackerel emperors, and birdwatching.

== Taxon described by her ==
- See Category:Taxa named by Helen K. Larson

== Taxon named in her honor ==
- The goby genus Larsonella was named in her honour while among the species named after her are
- pygmy pipehorse Idiotropiscis larsonae and the
- triplefin blenny Enneapterygius larsonae.
- The goby Stiphodon larson R. E. Watson, 1996 is named after her.
- The Goby Sueviota larsonae is named for her.
