= Ernest A. Lachner =

American ichthyologist

Ernest Albert Lachner (3 April 1915, New Castle, Pennsylvania – 7 January 1996, Winchester, Virginia) was an American ichthyologist with an international reputation for his research on Indo-Pacific gobies and cardinalfishes.

== Biography ==
Lachner graduated with a bachelor's degree from Pennsylvania State University. While enrolled in college, he went to Mexico and participated in biological and geographical surveys there. By 1939, he worked on New York State ichthyological surveys. During WW II he served as a master sergeant in the United States Army Force. As an oceanographic observer, he flew on B-25s in weather reconnaissance missions over the Indian Ocean. In 1946 he graduated with a Ph.D. in zoology from Cornell University.

Beginning in 1949, Lachner was employed for 34 years by the Smithsonian Institution as a curator of fishes at the National Museum of Natural History. He retired in 1983 as curator emeritus.

Dr. Lachner ... led the effort to add 250,000 fish specimens to the museum's Division of Fish collection during his first 15 years at the Smithsonian. His goal was to build the research collection of preserved fishes that is housed in the division and used by scientists throughout the world for ichthyological studies. Also during his tenure, he modernized the cataloguing system to allow for multiple cross-referencing and later helped with the development of a computerized cataloguing system.

Lachner was the author or co-author of 85 scientific reports on ichthyology and related issues in museum curation. He was awarded Guggenheim Fellowships in 1955 and 1959. He participated in Cruise 4B of the research vessel Anton Bruun. The purpose of the cruise, which lasted from early November to mid-December in 1962, was "to evaluate the relative distribution and abundance of benthic organisms inhabiting the continental shelf and uppoer slope of the Arabian Sea."

== Taxon described by him ==
- See Category:Taxa named by Ernest A. Lachner
- He named Eviota albolineata, commonly called spotted fringefin goby or whitelined eviota.

== Taxon named in his honor ==
Lachneratus phasmaticus and at least four other fish species have been named in his honor.

The Tombigbee darter Etheostoma lachneri is named in his honor.

Mesogobio lachneri Bănărescu & Nalbant 1973 was also named after him.

The Goby Sueviota lachneri R. Winterbottom & Hoese, 1988 is named for him.

== Death ==
Upon his death he was survived by his widow, Anna Mary Lachner, two daughters, a son, and four grandchildren. Another son died at age 10.

== Selected publications ==
- Raney, Edward C.; Lachner, Ernest A. (1939). "Observations on the Life History of the Spotted Darter, Poecilichthys maculatus (Kirtland)". Copeia. 1939 (3): 157–165. doi:10.2307/1436811. JSTOR 1436811.
- Raney, Edward C.; Lachner, Ernest A. (1942). "Studies of the Summer Food, Growth, and Movements of Young Yellow Pike-Perch, Stizostedion V. Vitreum, in Oneida Lake, New York". The Journal of Wildlife Management. 6 (1): 1. doi:10.2307/3795513. ISSN 0022-541X. JSTOR 3795513.
- Raney, E. C.; Lachner, E. A.; Pfeiffer, R. A.; Ross, R. D.; Schultz, L. P.; Reid, E. D. (1947). "Hypentelium roanokense, a new catostomid fish from the Roanoke River in Virginia" (PDF). American Museum Novitates (1333).
- Lachner, Ernest A. (1950). "The comparative food habits of the cyprinid fishes Nocomis biguttatus and Nocomis micropogon in western New York". Journal of the Washington Academy of Sciences. 40 (7): 229–236. JSTOR 24531751.
- Lachner, Ernest A.; Westlake, Edward F.; Handwerk, Paul S. (1950). "Studies on the Biology of Some Percid Fishes from Western Pennsylvania". The American Midland Naturalist. 43 (1): 92–111. doi:10.2307/2421881. JSTOR 2421881.
- Lachner, Ernest A. (1952). "Studies of the Biology of the Cyprinid Fishes of the Chub Genus Nocomis of Northeastern United States". The American Midland Naturalist. 48 (2): 433–466. doi:10.2307/2422260. JSTOR 2422260.
- Lachner, Ernest A. (1954). "A revision of the goatfish genus Upeneus with descriptions of two new species" (PDF). Proceedings of the United States National Museum. 103 (3330): 497–532. doi:10.5479/si.00963801.103-3330.497.
- Lachner, Ernest A.; Jenkins, Robert E. (1967). "Systematics, Distribution, and Evolution of the Chub Genus Nocomis (Cyprinidae) in the Southwestern Ohio River Basin, with the Description of a New Species". Copeia. 1967 (3): 557. doi:10.2307/1442234. ISSN 0045-8511. JSTOR 1442234.
- Lachner, Ernest A.; McKinney, James F. (1974). "Barbuligobius boehlkei, a New Indo-Pacific Genus and Species of Gobiidae (Pisces), with Notes on the Genera Callogobius and Pipidonia". Copeia. 1974 (4): 869–879. doi:10.2307/1442585. JSTOR 1442585.
- Collette, Bruce B.; Lachner, Ernest A. (1976). "Fish Collections in the United States and Canada". Copeia. 1976 (3): 625–642. JSTOR 1443399.
- Lachner, Ernest A.; Karnella, Susan J. (1980). "Fishes of the Indo-Pacific genus Eviota with descriptions of eight new species (Teleostei, Gobiidae)" (PDF). Smithsonian Contributions to Zoology (315): 1–127. doi:10.5479/si.00810282.315.
- Fraser, Thomas H.; Lachner, E. A. (1984). "An unusual Indo-west Pacific cardinalfish of the genus Apogon (Teleostei: Apogonidae)". Proceedings of the Biological Society of Washington. 97 (3): 632–636.
- Fraser, Thomas H.; Randall, John E.; Lachner, Ernest A. (1999). "A review of the Red Sea cardinalfishes of the Apogon bandanensis complex, with a description of a new species". JLB Smith Institute of Ichthyology.
