= Spotted cardinalfish =

Spotted cardinalfish is a common name for several fishes and may refer to:

- Apogon maculatus
- Fowleria variegata
- Ostorhinchus maculiferus
- Sphaeramia nematoptera
