= Polkadot cardinalfish =

Polkadot cardinalfish is a common name for several fishes and may refer to:

- Sphaeramia nematoptera
- Sphaeramia orbicularis
