= Amioides polyacanthus =

Conservation status
- Least Concern (IUCN 3.1)

Scientific classification
- Kingdom: Animalia
- Phylum: Chordata
- Class: Actinopterygii
- Division: Teleostei
- Order: Gobiiformes
- Family: Apogonidae
- Subfamily: Amioidinae
- Genus: Amioides
- Species: A. polyacanthus

Binomial name
- Amioides polyacanthus (Vaillant, 1877)

Synonyms
- Cheilodipterus polyacanthus Vaillant, 1877; Coranthus polyacanthus (Vaillant, 1877)

Genus of fishes

Amioides polyacanthus, the deepwater cardinalfish , is a species of marine ray-finned fish belonging to the family Apogonidae, the cardinalfishes. This cardinalfish has a wide Indo-Pacific distribution.

== Taxonomy ==
Amioides polyacanthus was first formally described as Cheilodipterus polyacanthus in 1877 by the French zoologist Léon Vaillant with its type locality given as Réunion in the Mascarene Islands of the western Indian Ocean. This taxon is now classified in the genus Amioides, a genus proposed by Hugh McCormick Smith and Lewis Radcliffe as a subgenus of Amia Gronow, 1854. However, Amia was preccuppied by Amia Linnaeus, 1758. The type species of Amia Gronow, 1854 is Amia percaeformis, Gronow's description was based on a drawing and no type exists so it is tentatively placed in the Apogonidae. When Smith and Radcliffe were describing Amiodes it was a monospecific genus and its only species was Amiodes grossidens. This taxon was regarded as a synonym of Coranthus J. L. B. Smith, 1961 as the type species of that genus was Cheilodipterus polyacanthus, and A. grossidens was regarded as a synonym of C. polyacanthus. A. grossidens and A. polyacanthus are now regarded as separate species. The genus Amioides is the type genus of the subfamily Amioidinae in the family Apogonidae in the suborder Apogonoidei in the order Gobiiformes.

== Etymology ==
Amioides polyacanthus is classified in the genus Amioides, this name suffixes -oides, meaning "form" or "shape", onto Amia Gronow, 1854, a non-binomial name applies to Apogon and which is now frequently used in the scientific names of cardinalfishes. The specific name, polyacanthus, means "many spined" and refers to the additional first dorsal fin spines, seven rather than the six in other members of Cheilodipterus, the genus Vaillant originally placed this species in.

== Description ==
Amioides polyacanthus has an elongated body with a compressed cross section and reaches a total length of 22 cm (8.7 in). There are 8 dorsal fin spines, 7 in the first doral spine and 1 in the second with 10 dorsal soft rays. The anal fin has 2 spines and 8 soft rays. Both the upper and lower jaws have sharp canine-like teeth. The deepwater cardinal fish is relatively large silvery grey to bronze species with a short dark-brown stripe along the middle of its sides, a yellowish-brown bar at the base of the caudal-fin, a diagonal brown bar underneath the eye running over the cheek, a brown bar on the front part of the gill cover and a dark front margin to the first dorsal fin.

== Distribution and habitat ==
Amioides polyacanthus is found throughout the Indo-West Pacific, it occurs in the Comoro Islands, the Mascarenes, Madagascar, Indonesia and Vanuatu northward to the Philippines, Palau, Taiwan and the Ryukyu Islands of Japan. It is found at depths between 77 and 276 m (253 and 906 ft) where there is a hard seabed and rubble, as well as in caves, near drop-offs and steep reef slopes.

== Biology ==
Amioides polyacanthus is often encountered solitarily, in pairs or as aggregations> It is frequently found in assocaition with coelacanths.
