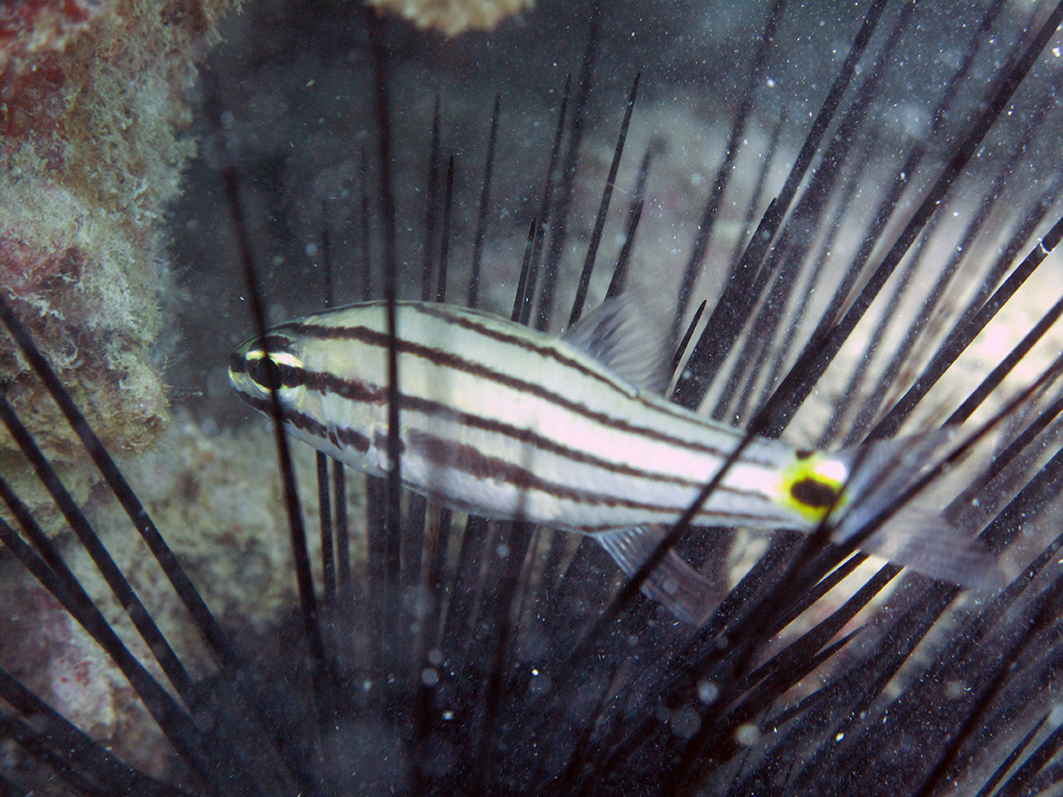

Scientific classification
- Kingdom: Animalia
- Phylum: Chordata
- Class: Actinopterygii
- Division: Teleostei
- Order: Gobiiformes
- Family: Apogonidae
- Genus: Cheilodipterus
- Species: C. novemstriatus

Binomial name
- Cheilodipterus novemstriatus (Rüppell, 1838)

Synonyms
- Apogon novemstriatus Rüppell, 1838; Cheilodipterus bipunctatus (Lachner, 1951); Paramia bipunctata Lachner, 1951

= Cheilodipterus novemstriatus =

Species of fish

Cheilodipterus novemstriatus, the Indian Ocean twospot cardinalfish, is a species of ray-finned fish from the Indian Ocean, which is a member of the family Apogonidae. It has colonised the eastern Mediterranean Sea by way of the Suez Canal since 2011.

== Description ==
Cheilodipterus novemstriatus has a slender body with a short snout, a terminal mouth which has canine-like teeth in both jaws, although no teeth occur at the symphysis of the lower jaw, and a large eye. Of the two dorsal fins, the origin of the first is slightly behind the origin of the pelvic fin. The anal fin is in line with the second dorsal fin and the caudal fin is forked. The body is an overall silver-grey in colour with five contrasting, longitudinal black stripes with the upper running near the base of the dorsal fin. The middle or third stripe starts at the snout running across the eye to the caudal peduncle, while the lower stripe runs along ventral surface in an arc, which terminates in front of the base of the pectoral fin, the portion of this stripe often becomes indistinct towards the base of the anal fin. The caudal peduncle has a large, oval, black spot which is surrounded by yellow background on the caudal peduncle and a second black spot is located on the dorsal surface of caudal peduncle. It is a small species, reaching a maximum length of 8 cm (3.1 in), but more commonly measures 2–6 cm (0.79–2.36 in) in length.

== Distribution ==
C. novemstriatus is native to the western Indian Ocean from the Red Sea to the Persian Gulf. In 2011, it was recorded in the Mediterranean Sea off Israel, then in Lebanon in 2012, southeastern Turkey in 2014 and in Cyprus in 2015. It is now established in the Levantine Sea, most likely introduced from the Red Sea via the Suez Canal.

== Biology ==
C. novemstriatus is common in shallow, sheltered waters and is found at depths of 1–10 metres (3.3–32.8 ft) over rocky reefs or coral, which have holes and ledges. It will shelter among the spines of sea urchins of the genus Diadema in groups of as many as 30 individuals, although this depends on the relative sizes of the urchin to those of the fishes. It has also been recorded from a shipwreck at a depth of 30 metres (98 ft) in the Mediterranean, where it was sympatric with the indigenous Mediterranean cardinalfish Apogon imberbis; it has also been recorded on hard substrates covered with calcareous algae, near rocky crevices and overhangs. It has been recorded sheltering alongside juveniles of the native wrasse Coris julis.

C. novemstriatus is nocturnal and emerges from its daytime shelters to feed in more open areas, and its nocturnal habits may have facilitated its successful invasion of the eastern Mediterranean, as few indigenous nocturnal competitors exist. Its main food is zooplankton, and in the Red Sea, it is frequently encountered at night along sandy shores at depths of 0.5–1.5 m. It is a social species and gathers in large groups, especially in its daytime shelters and even in the newly established Mediterranean populations, large schools have been encountered. Like other species of cardinalfish, C. novemstriatus shows pairing behaviour and courtship and the male broods the eggs in his mouth.
