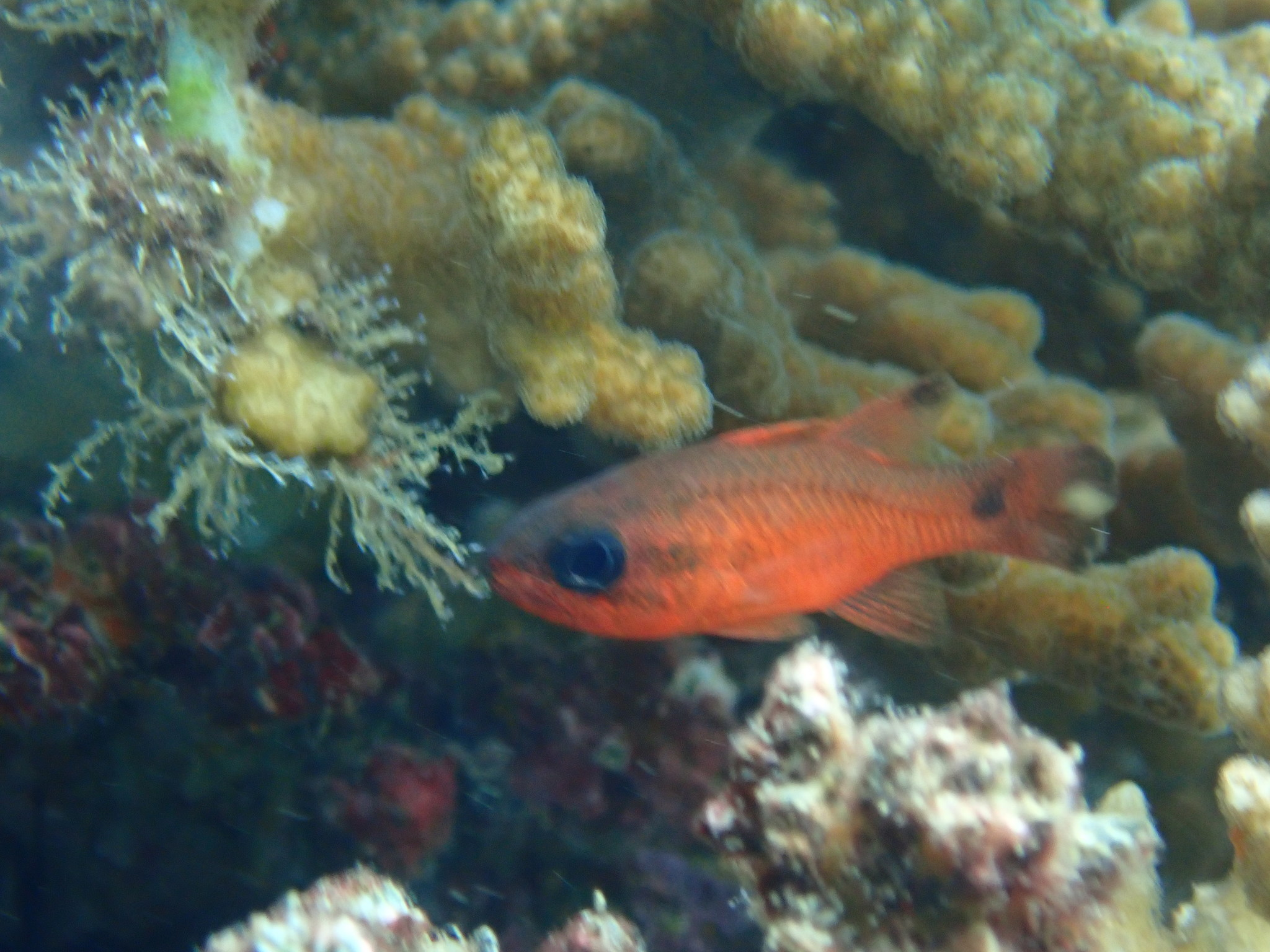

Conservation status
- Least Concern (IUCN 3.1)

Scientific classification
- Kingdom: Animalia
- Phylum: Chordata
- Class: Actinopterygii
- Order: Gobiiformes
- Family: Apogonidae
- Genus: Apogon
- Species: A. dovii

Binomial name
- Apogon dovii Günther, 1861

= Apogon dovii =

Species of fish

Apogon dovii, also known by its common name tailspot cardinalfish, is a species from the genus Apogon. The species was originally described by Albert Günther in 1861.

== Description ==
A. dovii is a red fish with large black spot at the base of the tail fin. It can grow up to 10 cm (3.9 in) in length. The height of the body is one-third of the total length and the length of the head is two-fifths of the total length. It has eyes of which the diameter is more than one-third of the length of the head.

== Look-a-like ==
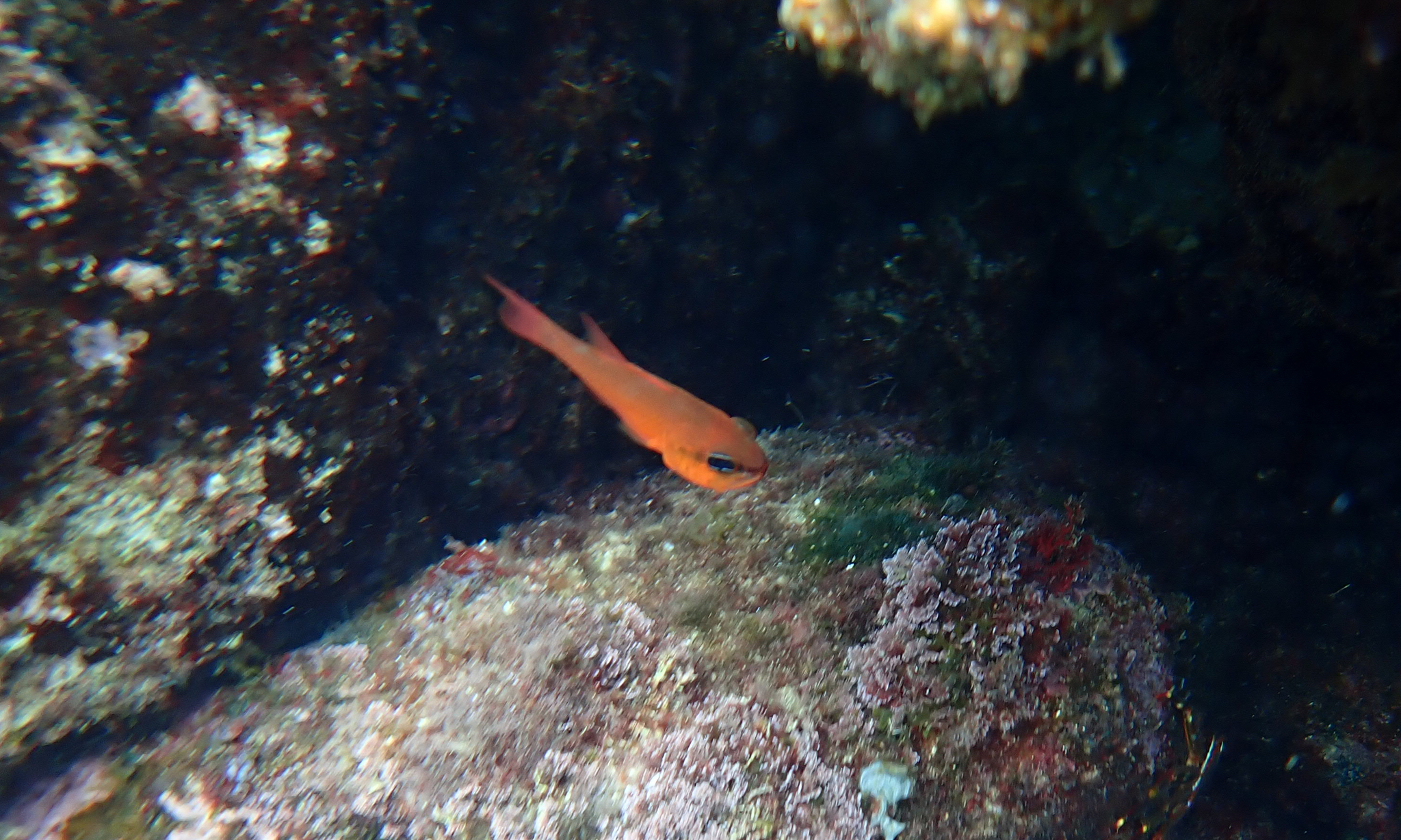
Apogon imberbis is said to look similar to A.dovii

Despite differences in range does the A. dovii looks very similar to the Apogon imberbis, to the extent that Albert Günther suggested considering them the same when he originally described the species.

== Range ==
The species has been observed from Mexico to Panama.
