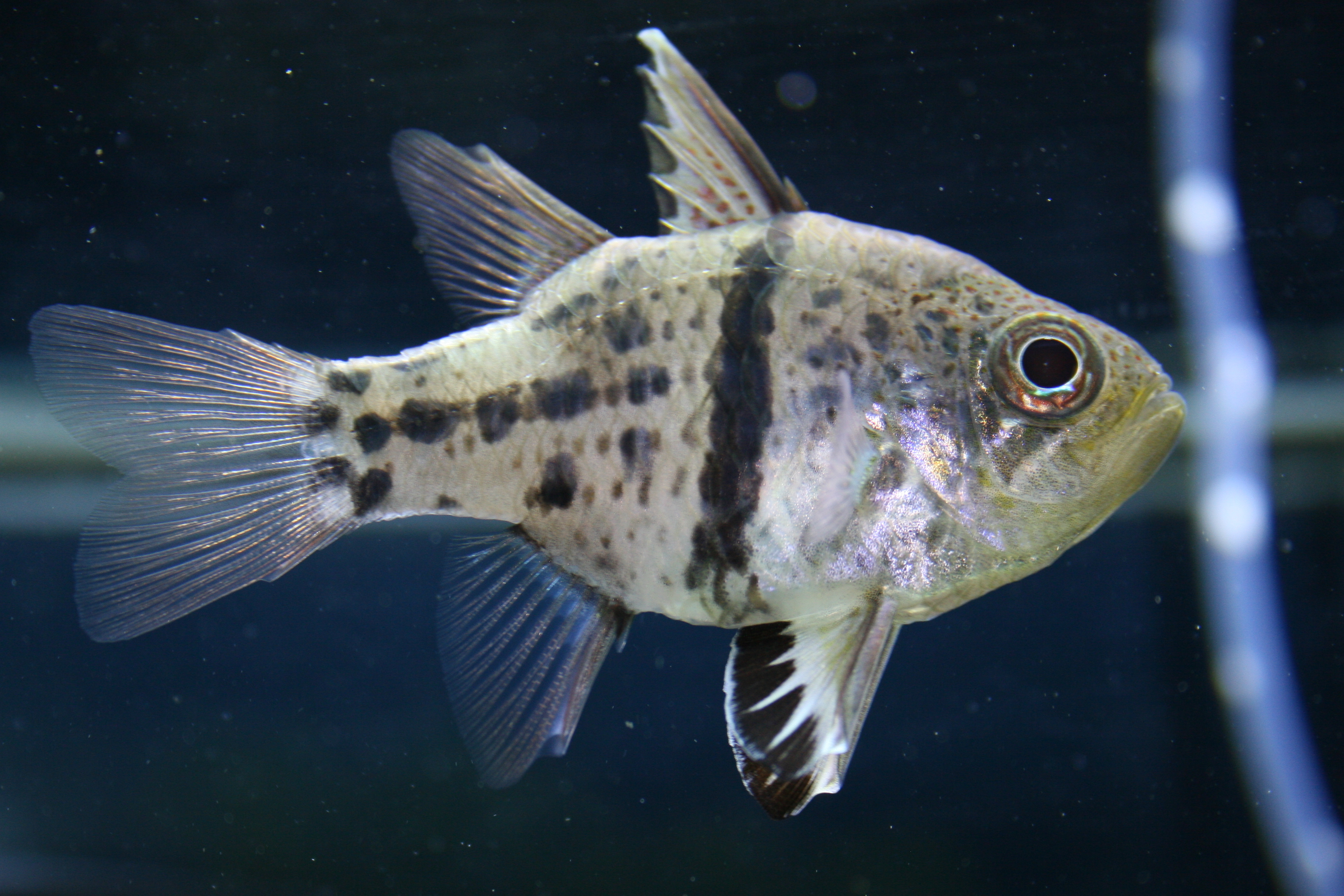

Conservation status
- Least Concern (IUCN 3.1)

Scientific classification
- Kingdom: Animalia
- Phylum: Chordata
- Class: Actinopterygii
- Division: Teleostei
- Order: Gobiiformes
- Family: Apogonidae
- Genus: Sphaeramia
- Species: S. orbicularis

Binomial name
- Sphaeramia orbicularis (G. Cuvier, 1828)

Synonyms"Cof genus"/>
- Apogon orbicularis Cuvier, 1828; Apogon nigromaculatus Hombron & Jacquinot, 1853

= Sphaeramia orbicularis =

Species of fish

Sphaeramia orbicularis, the orbiculate cardinalfish, orbicular cardinalfish, polka-dot cardinalfish, coral cardinal fish or chubby cardinal, is a species of marine ray-finned fish belonging to the family Apogonidae, the cardinalfishes. This cardinalfish is found in the Indian and western Pacific Oceans.

== Taxonomy ==
Sphaeramia orbicularis was first formally described as Apogon orbicularis in 1828 by the French zoologist Georges Cuvier in volume 2 of Histoire naturelle des poissons with its type locality given as Java in Indonesia. This species is now classified in the genus Sphaeramia, which was described in 1930 by Henry Weed Fowler and Barton Appler Bean as a subgenus of Amia with Apogon nematopterus designated as its type species. The genus Sphaeramia along with 5 other genera, is placed in the tribe Sphaeramiini within the subfamily Apogoninae. The family Apogonidae is in the suborder Apogonoidei in the order Gobiiformes.

== Etymology ==
Sphaeramia orbicularis, is one of 2 species in the genus Sphaeramia, a name which prefixes sphaero-, derived from sphaī́ra, meaning "ball", an allusion to the “spherical profile” of S. nematoptera, onto Amia. Amia, in this case, is a non binomial name originally coined by Laurens Theodorus Gronovius for the genus Apogon which is now used as a common suffix for genus names within the cardinalfish family. The specific name, orbicularis, is Latin for "circular" or "disc-shaped", a reference to the disc-like body shape of this fish.

== Description ==
Sphaeramia orbicularis has a short and deep body with a compressed cross section. It reaches a maximum total length of 10 cm (3.9 in), although a standard length of 8.9 cm (3.5 in) is more typical. The first dorsal fin has 6 spines, the second has a single spine and 9 soft rays while the anal fin contains 2 spines and 8 soft rays. The overall colour is light greyish with a dark vertical bar running from the origin of the first dorsal-fin origin to just before the anus, continuing onto the pelvic fin. There is a scattering of dark spots on the posterior part of the body.

== Distribution and habitat ==
Sphaeramia orbicularis is found in the western Indian Ocean, the eastern Indian Ocean and the western Pacific Ocean. In the eastern Indian Ocean this species is found from the southern Red Sea south to Mozambique, occurring in the Comoro Islands and the Seychelles. It is absent from the central Indian Ocean then occurs from the Andaman Sea east to the Gilbert Islands, Fiji and Tonga, north to the Yaeyama Islands of southern Japan and south to northeastern Australia and New Caledonia. This species is found in sheltered inlets and coastlines, forming schools around the roots of mangroves, rocks, debris and below piers.
