= Apogonichthys perdix =

Conservation status
- Least Concern (IUCN 3.1)

Scientific classification
- Kingdom: Animalia
- Phylum: Chordata
- Class: Actinopterygii
- Division: Teleostei
- Order: Gobiiformes
- Family: Apogonidae
- Genus: Apogonichthys
- Species: A. perdix

Binomial name
- Apogonichthys perdix Bleeker, 1854

Synonyms
- Apogon asaedae Seale, 1935; Apogon (Apogonichthys) infuscus Fourmanoir, 1955

Species of fish

Apogonichthys perdix, the perdix cardinalfish or threespot cardinalfish, is a species of marine ray-finned fish belonging to the family Apogonidae, the cardinalfishes. This cardinalfish has a wide distribution across the Indian and Pacific Oceans.

== Taxonomy ==
Apogonichthys perdix was first formally described in 1854 by the Dutch physician and ichthyologist Pieter Bleeker with its type locality given as Larantuka, Flores, East Nusa Tenggara, Indonesia. When he described this species Bleeker also described the new monospecific genus Apogonichthys, this species is the type species of that genus by monotypy. The genus Apogonichthys is classified in the tribe Apogonichthyini, in the subfamily Apogoninae in the family Apogonidae in the suborder Apogonoidei in the order Gobiiformes.

== Etymology ==
Apogonichthys perdix is the type species of the gneus Apongonichthys, a name which suffixes the Greekword for fish, -ichthys on to the genus name Apogon because this taxon is closely relates to that genus. The specific name, perdic, means "partridge", an allusion Bleeker did bot explain but it is thought that it refers to the mottled brown colour of this species.

== Description ==
Apogonichthys perdix has a short and deep body with a compressed cross section and it reaches a total length of 7 cm (2.8 in). The first dorsal fin is supported by 7 spines, the second by a single spine and 9 soft rays while the anal fin contains 2 spines and 8 soft rays. The pectoral fins have 14 rays. The preoperculum margin is poorly ossified and the front nostril has a short flap. The maxilla extends to, or just past, the posterior edge of the orbit. There is a band of tiny villiform teeth on both jaws and the vomer. The body is brownish to reddish in colour, as are the fins other than the pectoral fins. The body often has darkish spots which form indistinct stripes and there are sometimes 3 other darkish markings on the head, one running from the eye onto the cheek, another behind the eye, and the third from the eye to the posttemporal region above the origin of the lateral line.

== Distribution and habitat ==
Apogonichthys perdix has a wide Indo-Pacific range which runs from the eastern coast of Africa from the Red Sea to South Africa east across the Indian Ocean into the Pacific Ocean north to southern Japan, south to Australia and east to French Polynesia. It is a nocturnal species found at depths between 1 and 65 m (3 and 213 ft) in areas with abundant seagrass or algae, coral rubble, reef flats, as well as silted and dead reefs.

== Biology ==
Apogonichthys perdix is a mouthbrooder.
