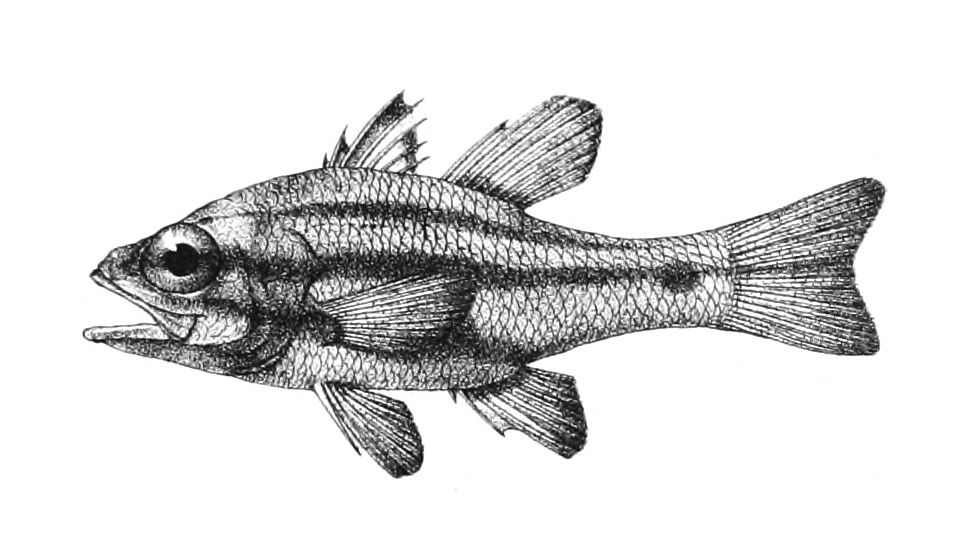

Conservation status
- Least Concern (IUCN 3.1)

Scientific classification
- Kingdom: Animalia
- Phylum: Chordata
- Class: Actinopterygii
- Division: Teleostei
- Order: Gobiiformes
- Family: Apogonidae
- Genus: Lepidamia
- Species: L. kalosoma

Binomial name
- Lepidamia kalosoma Bleeker, 1852

Synonyms
- Apogon kalosoma Bleeker, 1852; Apogon godini Bleeker, 1854; Apogon noordzieki Bleeker, 1859

= Lepidamia kalosoma =

Species of fish

Lepidamia kalosoma, the pinstripe cardinalfish, is a species of marine ray-finned fish belonging to the family Apogonidae, the cardinalfishes. This cardinalfish is found in the Indian and Pacific Oceans.

== Taxonomy ==
Lepidamia kalosoma was first formally described as Apogon kalosama in 1852 by the Dutch physician and ichthyologist Pieter Bleeker with its type locality given as Bangka, Indonesia. In 1863 Theodore Gill described the new genus Lepidamia with A. kalosoma being its only species and its type species by monotypy. This genus is placed in the monotypic tribe Lepidamiini within the subfamily Apogoninae. The family Apogonidae is in the suborder Apogonoidei in the order Gobiiformes.

== Etymology ==
Lepidamia kalosoma is the type species of the genus Lepidamia, this name combines the lepίs, meaning "scale", with Amia, a non binomial name originally coined by Laurens Theodorus Gronovius for the genus Apogon which is now used as a common suffix for genus names within the cardinalfish family. This is an allusion to the greater number of scales on the lateral line of this species than the other Amia Gronow taxa. The specific name, kalosoma, is a combination of kallos which means, "beauty", with sṓma, meaning "body", an allusion to how the golden body was described by Bleeker as “very beautifully marked” (translation) with two broader and several more slender horizontal bands.

== Description ==
Lepidamia kalosoma reaches a standard length of 14 cm (5.5 in). The first dorsal fin contains 8 spines with the eighth spine being tiny and may be hidden under the scales, the second dorsal fin has a single spine and 9 soft rays and the anal fin has 2 spines and 8 soft rays. Adult pinstripe cardinalfishes are reddish in colour with many thin reddish or dark brown horizontal stripes. The juveniles have three dark spots, one at the base of the first two spines in the dorsal fin, another to the rear of the dorsal fin and the third behind the anal fin.

== Distribution and habiatat ==
Lepidamia kalosoma is found from western and eastern India, Sri Lanka, Saint Martin's Island in Bangladesh, Thailand, Malaysia, Singapore, the northeast coast of Sumatra and Borneo in Indonesia, Brunei, the Philippines and Taiwan. Records from the Indian Ocean west of India may need to be verified. This species is found at depths between 3 and 15 m (10 and 50 ft), it occurs in estuaries and in caves and ledges in coral reefs.
