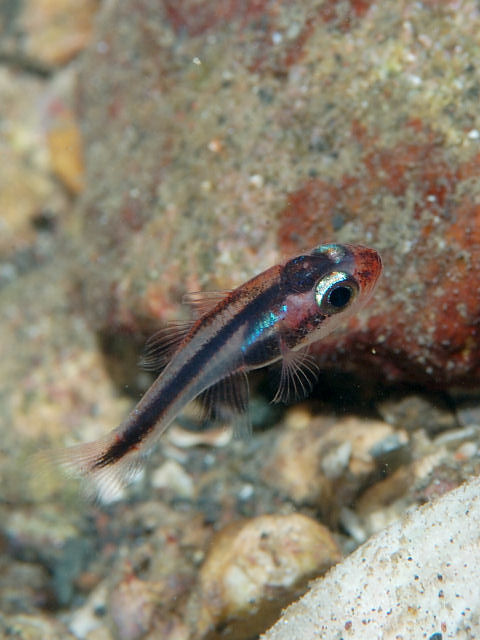

Conservation status
- Least Concern (IUCN 3.1)

Scientific classification
- Kingdom: Animalia
- Phylum: Chordata
- Class: Actinopterygii
- Division: Teleostei
- Order: Gobiiformes
- Family: Apogonidae
- Genus: Apogon
- Species: A. semiornatus

Binomial name
- Apogon semiornatus W. K. H. Peters, 1876

Synonyms
- Apogon warreni Regan, 1908; Amia diencaea Smith & Radcliffe, 1912

= Apogon semiornatus =

Species of fish

Apogon semiornatus, the oblique-banded cardinalfish, halfband cardinalfish or threeband cardinal fish, is a species of marine ray-finned fish belonging to the family Apogonidae, the cardinalfishes. This cardinalfish has a wide Indo-Pacific distribution.

== Taxonomy ==
Apogon semiornatus was first formally described in 1876 by the German naturalist and explorer Wilhelm Peters with its type locality given as Île aux Fouquets, 8 km (5.0 mi) east of Mahébourg in Mauritius. This species is classified in the genus Apogon, the type genus of the tribe Apogonini, the subfamily Apogoninae and the family Apogonidae in the suborder Apogonoidei in the order Gobiiformes.

== Etymology ==
Apogon semiornatus is a species in the genus Apogon, this name means "beardless", as the type species A. imberbis was thought to be a mullet with no barbels, and known as the "king of mullets". The specific name, semiornatus, combines semi, meaning "half", with ornatus, which means "decorated". Peters did not explain this but it may be an allusion to the wide, reddish stripe that extends from the snout to the base of the anal fin, i.e. half the length of the body.

== Description ==
Apogon semiornatus has a short, deep, laterally compressed body which reaches a total length of 7.5 cm (3.0 in). The dorsal fin is supported by 7 spines and 9 soft rays while the anal fin contains 2 spines and 8 soft rays. This fish is a transluscent grey and ref species with red on the snout, a short black stripe running from behind the eye to the anus and s econd balck band from the eye to the caudal peduncle.

== Distribution and habitat ==
Apogon semiornatus has a wide Indo-Pacific distribution from the coast of East Africa and Arabia through the Indian Ocean islands, the Malay Archipelago, north to southern Japan and south to northern Australia from Houtman Abrolhos, Western Australia, around the north coast and south to Montague Island, New South Wales, including reefs in the Coral Sea and Christmas Island. It extends east into the Pacific as far as Fiji and the Phoenix Islands of Kiribati. The oblique-banded cardinalfish is a retiring and solitary fish which hides beneath ledges, in caves and crevices and among rocks in coral reefs and seaward slopes.
