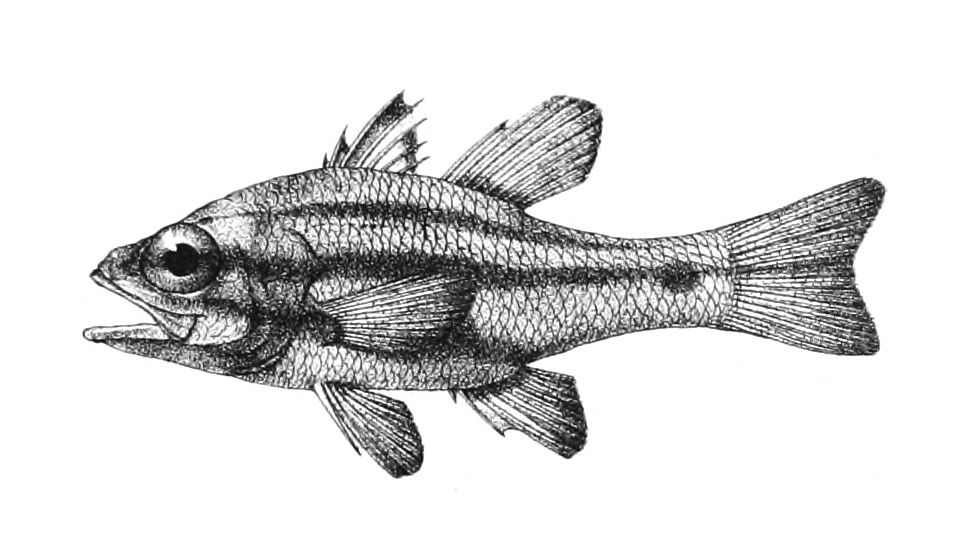
- Lepidamia kalasoma

Scientific classification
- Kingdom: Animalia
- Phylum: Chordata
- Class: Actinopterygii
- Order: Gobiiformes
- Family: Apogonidae
- Subfamily: Apogoninae
- Genus: Lepidamia; T. N. Gill, 1863

Type species
- Apogon kalosoma Bleeker, 1852

= Lepidamia =

Genus of fishes

Lepidamia is a genus of fishes in the family Apogonidae, the cardinalfishes.

== Species ==
The currently recognized species in this genus are:

- Lepidamia kalosoma (Bleeker, 1852) (pinstripe cardinalfish)
- Lepidamia multitaeniata (G. Cuvier, 1828) (smallscale cardinalfish)
- Lepidamia natalensis (Gilchrist & W. W. Thompson, 1908)
- Lepidamia omanensis (Gon & Mee, 1995) (Oman cardinalfish)
