= Amioides =

- Deepwater cardinalfish (Amioides polyacanthus)

Scientific classification
- Kingdom: Animalia
- Phylum: Chordata
- Class: Actinopterygii
- Division: Teleostei
- Order: Gobiiformes
- Family: Apogonidae
- Subfamily: Amioidinae
- Genus: Amioides; H. M. Smith & Radcliffe, 1912

Type species
- Amia (Amioides) grossidens H. M. Smith & Radcliffe, 1912

Synonyms
- Coranthus J. L. B. Smith, 1961

Genus of fishes

Amioides is a genus of marine ray-finned fishes belonging to the family Apogonidae, the cardinalfishes. These cardinalfishes are found in the Indo-Pacific region.

== Species ==
Amioides contains the following valid species:

- Amioides grossidens (H. M. Smith & Radcliffe, 1912)
- Amioides polyacanthus (Vaillant, 1877)
