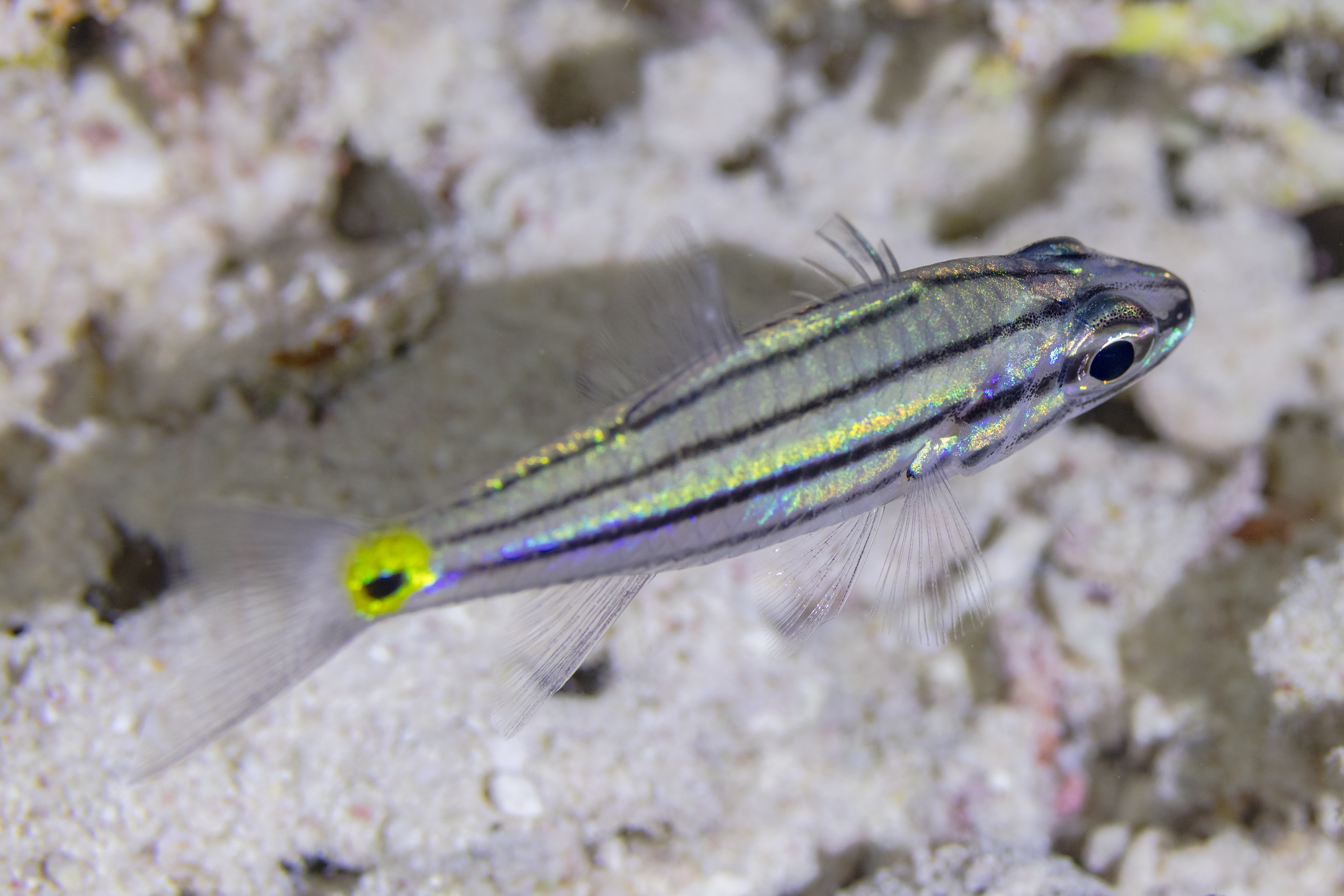

Scientific classification
- Kingdom: Animalia
- Phylum: Chordata
- Class: Actinopterygii
- Order: Gobiiformes
- Family: Apogonidae
- Genus: Cheilodipterus
- Species: C. quinquelineatus

Binomial name
- Cheilodipterus quinquelineatus Cuvier, 1828

Synonyms
- Ostorhinchus popur (Montrouzier, 1857); Paramia quinquelineata (Cuvier, 1828); Cheilodipterus popur Montrouzier, 1857

= Five-lined cardinalfish =

Species of ray-finned fish

The five-lined cardinalfish (Cheilodipterus quinquelineatus) is a species of marine fish in the family Apogonidae. It is widespread throughout the tropical waters of the Indo-Pacific region, Red Sea included. It can reach a maximum size of 13 cm (5.1 in) in length.
