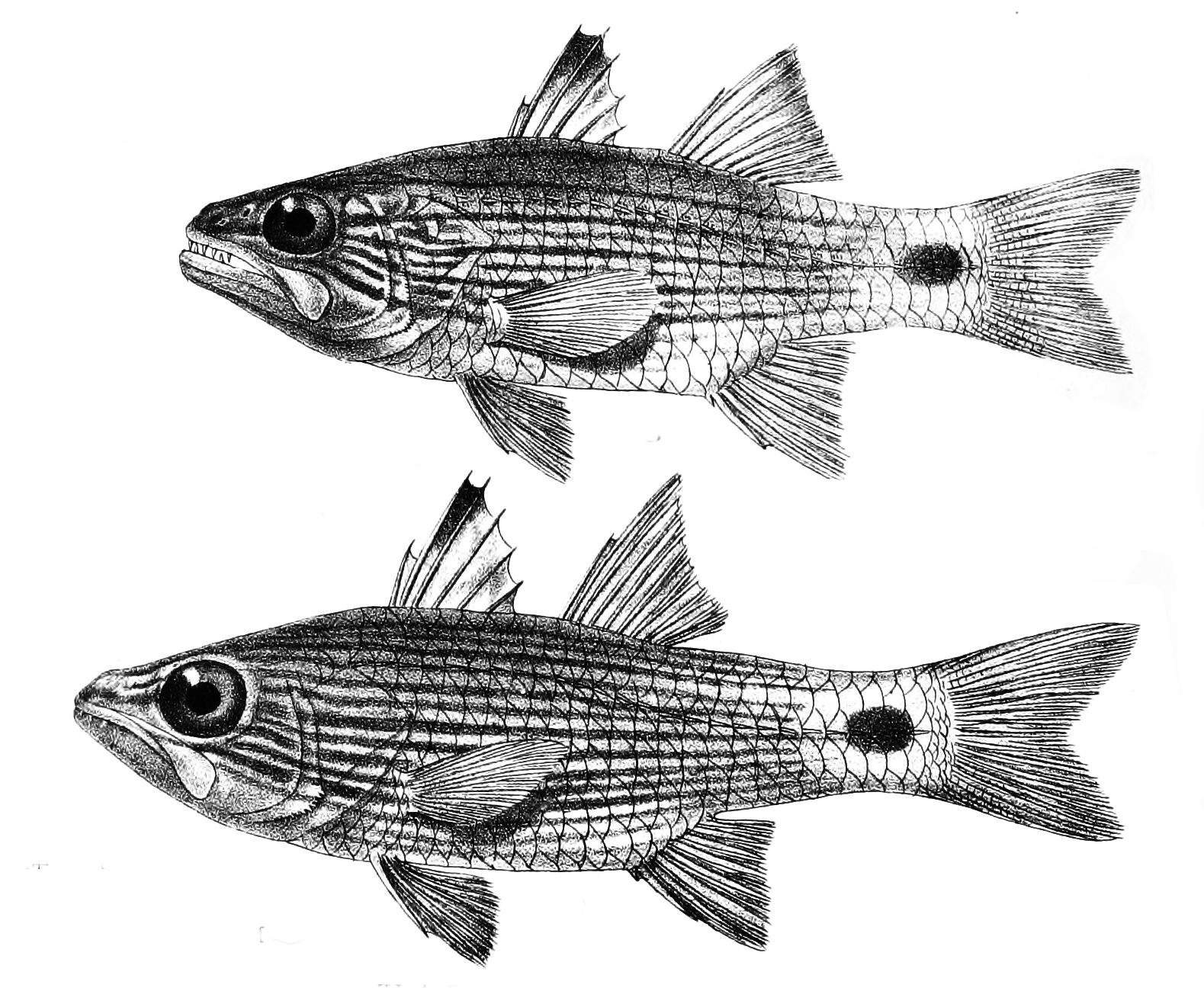

Scientific classification
- Kingdom: Animalia
- Phylum: Chordata
- Class: Actinopterygii
- Division: Teleostei
- Order: Gobiiformes
- Family: Apogonidae
- Genus: Cheilodipterus
- Species: C. arabicus

Binomial name
- Cheilodipterus arabicus (Gmelin, 1789)

Synonyms
- Perca arabica Gmelin, 1798; Perca lineata Forsskål, 1775; Cheilodipterus lineatus (Forsskål, 1775); Cheilodipterus caninus J. L. B. Smith, 1949; Cheilodipterus lachneri Klausewitz, 1959

= Cheilodipterus arabicus =

Species of fish

Cheilodipterus arabicus the tiger cardinalfish, dogtooth cardinalfish or Arabian cardinalfish, is a species of marine ray-finned fish belonging to the family Apogonidae, the cardinalfishes. This cardinalfish is found in the Western Indian Ocean.

== Taxonomy ==
Cheilodipterus arabicus was first formally described as Perca arabica by the German naturalist, chemist and biologist Johann Friedrich Gmelin with its type locality given as Jeddah on the Red Sea coast of Saudi Arabia. P. arabica was a replacement for P. lineata Forsskål, 1775 which was preoccupied by Perca lineata Linnaeus, 1758. However, some authorities have regarded P. lineata Forsskål, 1755 as a valid name for this taxon but others point out that no petition has been made to the International Commission on Zoological Nomenclature to confirm its validity. This species is classified in the genus Cheilodipterus, a genus that was described in 1801 by Bernard Germain de Lacépède with Cheilodipterus lineatus Lacépède 1801 being designated as its type species in 1917 by David Starr Jordan. The genus Cheilodipterus is classified in the monotypic tribe Cheilodipterini, in the subfamily Apogoninae in the family Apogonidae in the suborder Apogonoidei in the order Gobiiformes.

== Etymology ==
Cheilodipterus arabicus is a member of the genus Cheilodipterus, this name combines cheī́los, which means "lip" and is a reference to the extensible upper lip of C. lineatus, and di, which means "two", and pterus, meaning "fin," a reference to the two dorsal fins, a characteristic common to all cardinalfishes.

== Description ==
Cheilodipterus arabicus has a fusiform body and reaches a standard length of 18 cm (7.1 in). The background colour is light brown with between 13 and 16 darker brown longitudinal stripes, these may become irregular in larger specimens. There is a small dark spot surrounded by a yellow area on the caudal peduncle, this spot is sometimes enlarged to create a dark brown bar around the caudal peduncle. There is a clear white bar between the dark spot, or bar, and the rear ends of stripes on the body. The first dorsal fin is dusky to dark brown and the other fins are pale in younger fish darkening to dusky, but never as dark as the first dorsal fin. The snout is rather darker than the body.

== Distribution and habitat ==
Cheilodipterus arabicus is found in the Western Indian Ocean where it has been recorded from Pakistan, the Gulf of Oman, Arabian Sea, Red Sea, Tanzania, Mozambique, Seychelles and India but it has not been recorded from the Gulf of Aqaba, the Persian Gulf and the Maldives. This species is encountered in small shoals on rocky and coral reefs.
