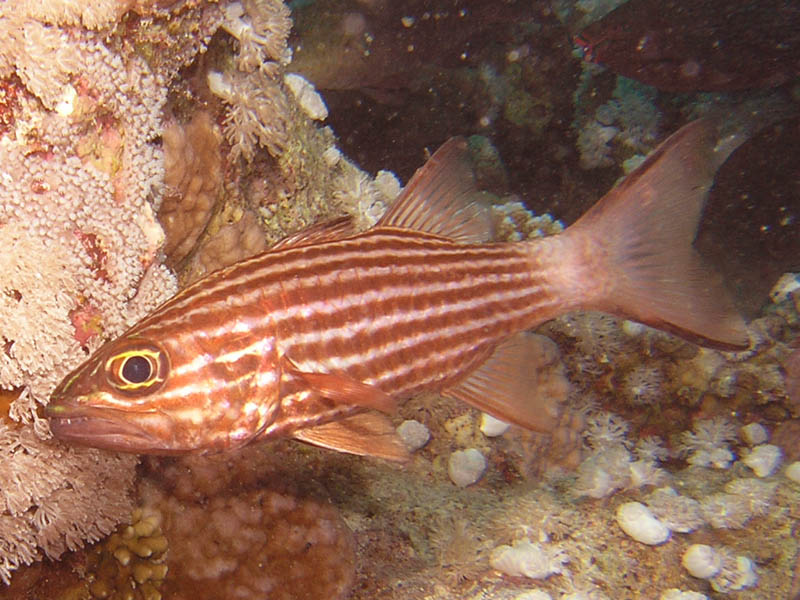

Conservation status
- Least Concern (IUCN 3.1)

Scientific classification
- Kingdom: Animalia
- Phylum: Chordata
- Class: Actinopterygii
- Division: Teleostei
- Order: Gobiiformes
- Family: Apogonidae
- Genus: Cheilodipterus
- Species: C. macrodon

Binomial name
- Cheilodipterus macrodon (Lacépède, 1802)

Synonyms
- Centropomus macrodon Lacépède, 1802; Apogon melanurus Bleeker, 1860; Paramia octolineata Bleeker, 1872; synonyms_ref =

= Cheilodipterus macrodon =

Species of fish

Cheilodipterus macrodon, the large-toothed cardinalfish, big-toothed cardinalfish big-toothed percelle, eight-lined cardinalfish or tiger cardinalfish, is a species of marine ray-finned fish in the family Apogonidae, the cardinalfishes. It is widespread throughout the tropical waters of the Indo-Pacific region, including the Red Sea.

== Taxonomy ==
Cheilodipterus macrodon was first formally described in 1802 as Centropomus macrodon by the French naturalist Bernard Germain de Lacépèdewith its type locality given as Mauritius. Lacépède's description was based on a drawing in a manuscript by Philibert Commerson. In 1929 Max C. W. Weber and Lieven Ferdinand de Beaufort reclassified this species in the genus Cheilodipterus, which Lacépède had named in 1801. The type species of this genus was designated as C. lineatus Lacépède, 1801 by David Starr Jordan in 1917, C. macrodon has been regarded as a synonymous with C. lineatus. The genus Cheilodipterus is sometomes classified in the tribe Cheilodipterini, in the subfamily Apogoninae and the family Apogonidae in the suborder Apogonoidei in the order Gobiiformes.

== Etymology ==
Cheilodipterus macrodon belongs to the genus Cheilodipterus, a name which combines cheilos, meaning "lip", with dyo, which means "two", and pterus, which means "fin". This is a reference to the extensible upper lip of C. lineatus, the type species, and the two dorsal fins typical of cardinalfishes. The specific name, macrodon, means "large tooth", an allusion to the row of long, pointed teeth on each jaw, these are longer and sharper longer than the villiform teeth of Centropomus, the genus Lacépède originally classified this species in.

== Description ==
Cheilodipterus macrodon has a short, deep body with a compressed cross section which reaches a total length of 25 cm (9.8 in), the deepest part is around one third to two fifths of the standard length . The first dorsal fin has six spines while the second has one spine and nine soft rays. The anal fin has two spines and eight soft rays. There is a row of large canine-like teeth in each jaw and the margin of the gill cover is serrated. The adults have eight broad reddish brown stripes on a light grey background colour, the base of the caudal fin is whoitish and the caudal fin margin is dark. The juveniles have a large black blotch on the caudal peduncle which becomes indistinct as they mature.

== Distribution and habitat ==
Cheilodipterus macrodon has a wide distribution which includes the REd Sea south to the Aliwal Shoal, east across the Indian Ocean into the Western Pacific, north to southern Japan and south to Australia, east as far as the Marshall Islands and Pitcairn Islands. This species is common on the outer slopes of reefs at depths between 0.5 to 40 m (1 ft 8 in to 131 ft 3 in), as well as in caves and ledges on lagoon and seaward reefs.

== Biology ==
Cheilodipterus macrodon reach sexual maturity at 8 cm (3.1 in) in length. The adults are typically found in pairs or small groups made up of several pairs. The juveniles are solitary or aggregate in small groups. This is a monogamous species that always forms pairs that hold home ranges, but not an exclusive territory. The adults feed mainly on small fishes.
