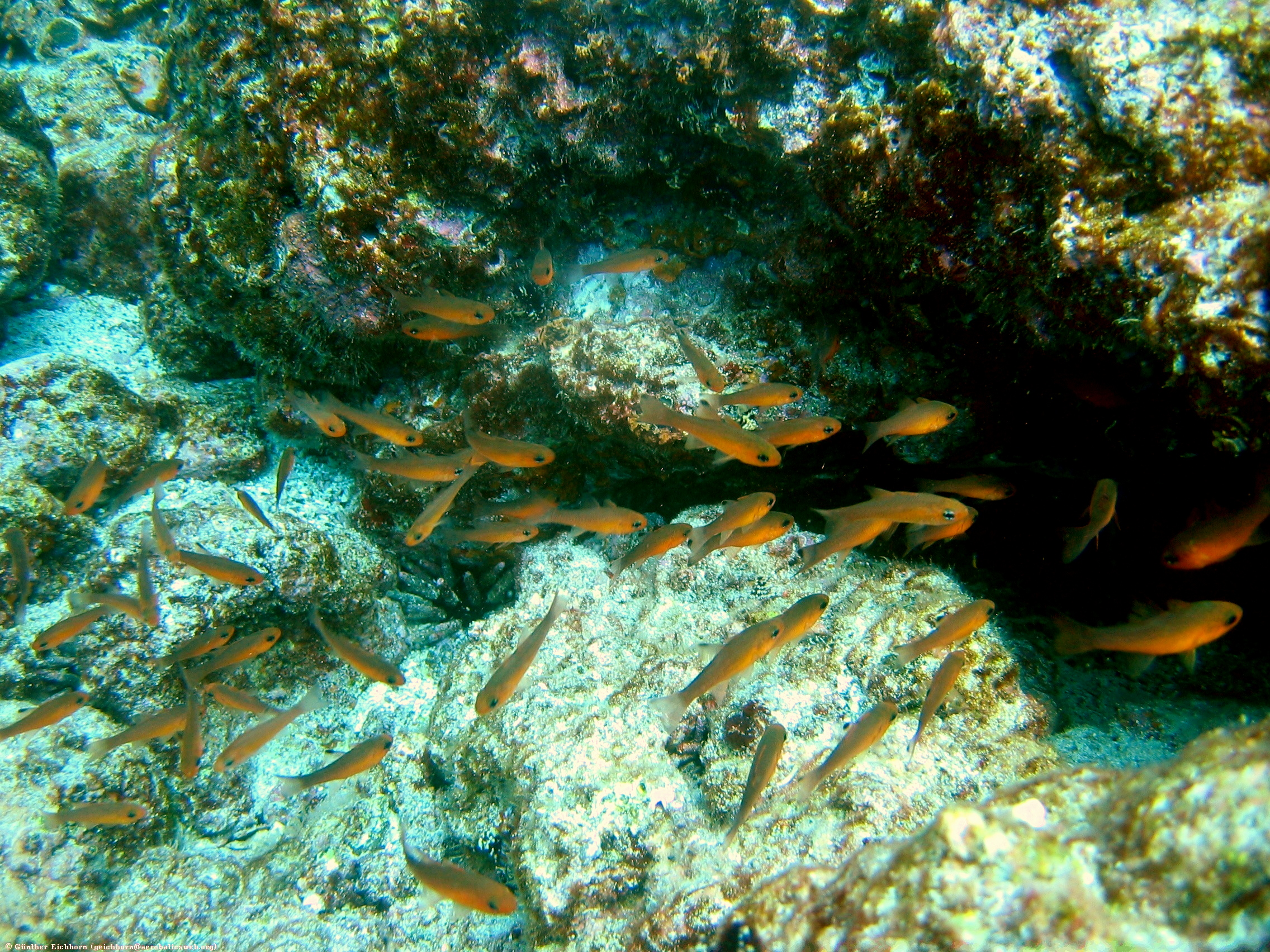
- Apogon atradorsatus

Conservation status
- Least Concern (IUCN 3.1)

Scientific classification
- Kingdom: Animalia
- Phylum: Chordata
- Class: Actinopterygii
- Order: Gobiiformes
- Family: Apogonidae
- Genus: Apogon
- Species: A. atradorsatus

Binomial name
- Apogon atradorsatus Heller & Snodgrass, 1903

= Blacktip cardinalfish =

Species of fish

The blacktip cardinalfish (Apogon atradorsatus) is a reef fish in the South Pacific. They inhabit rocky reefs at depths from 3–45 m. They stay under ledge overhangs and other shaded areas on rocky reefs and slopes during the day and feeds in the open at night.

== Distribution ==
The blacktip cardinalfish is found in Galapagos, Cocos and Malpelo Islands
