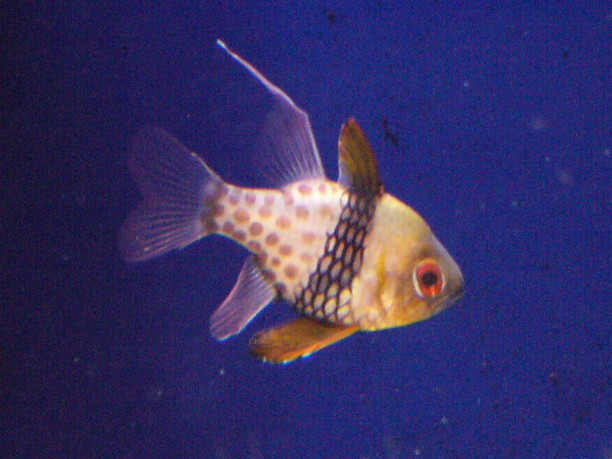
- Sphaeramia nematoptera

Scientific classification
- Kingdom: Animalia
- Phylum: Chordata
- Class: Actinopterygii
- Order: Gobiiformes
- Family: Apogonidae
- Subfamily: Apogoninae
- Genus: Sphaeramia; Fowler & B. A. Bean, 1930

Type species
- Apogon nematopterus Bleeker 1856

= Sphaeramia =

Genus of fishes

Sphaeramia is a genus of the Apogonidae (cardinalfishes). They are marine fish that live in shallow tropical reefs in the Indian and Pacific Oceans

== Species ==
The recognized species in this genus are:

- Sphaeramia nematoptera (Bleeker, 1856) (pajama cardinalfish)
- Sphaeramia orbicularis (G. Cuvier, 1828) (orbiculate cardinalfish)
