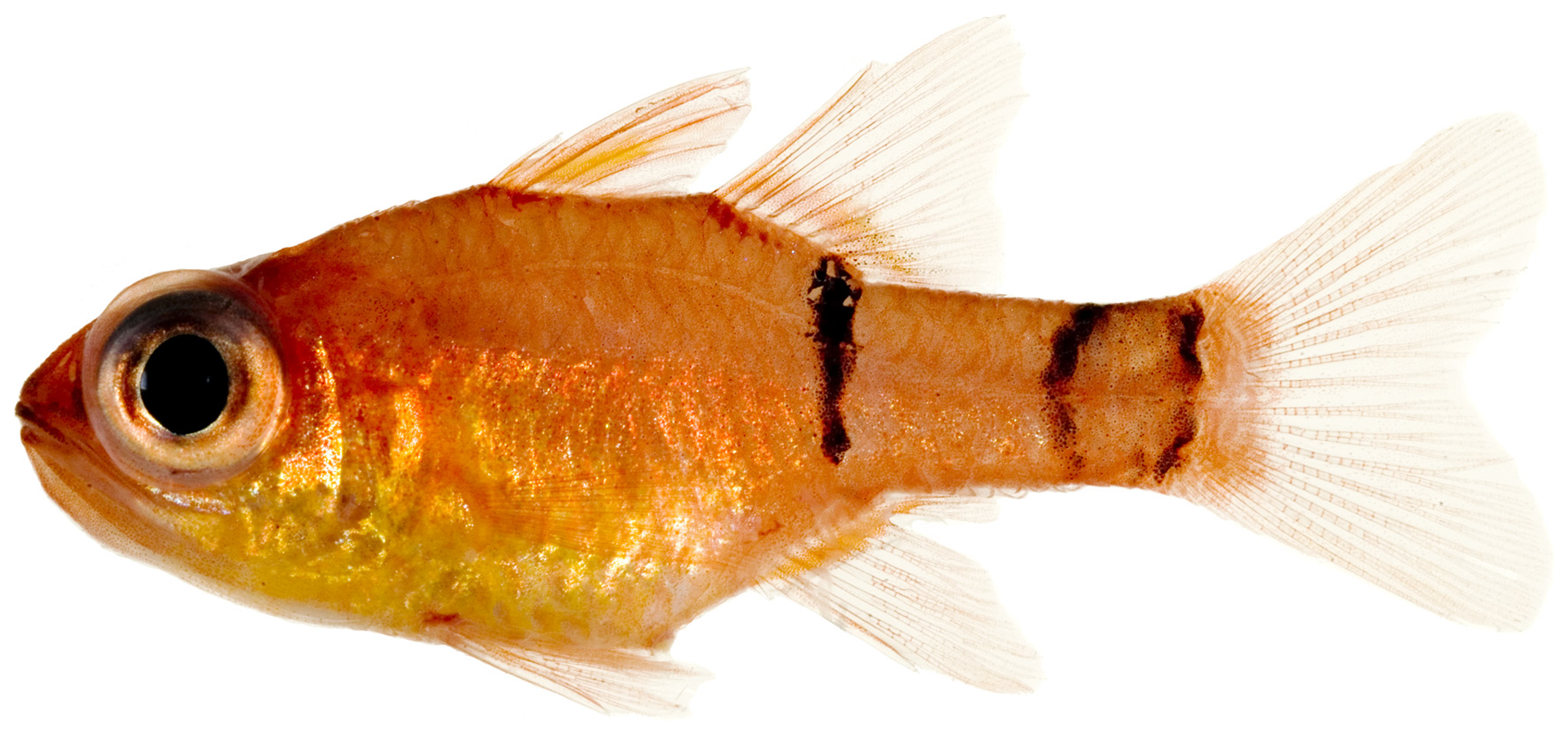
- Apogon townsendi

Conservation status
- Least Concern (IUCN 3.1)

Scientific classification
- Kingdom: Animalia
- Phylum: Chordata
- Class: Actinopterygii
- Order: Gobiiformes
- Family: Apogonidae
- Genus: Apogon
- Species: A. townsendi

Binomial name
- Apogon townsendi Breder, 1927

= Belted cardinalfish =

Species of fish

The belted cardinalfish (Apogon townsendi) is a tropical marine fish in the genus Apogon. They grow up to 6.5 centimetres (2.6 in) in length. Belted cardinalfish are found in the waters of the western Atlantic Ocean, off Central and South America, inhabiting caves and holes. They are pinkish-red on the dorsal side and yellowish-red on the ventral side. Their eggs are carried in the mouth of the adult as they mature.

== Description ==
Belted cardinalfish reach a maximum length of 6.5 centimetres (2.6 in). They have two dorsal fins; there are six spines in the first and one on the first with nine rays. The pectoral fins have 12 rays and the anal fins have two spines and eight rays. The caudal (tail) fin is forked with twelve scales around the caudal peduncle.

The dorsal side is red or reddish-pink, whereas the ventral side is reddish-yellow. A dark ring is present anterior to the caudal fin, lightening towards the caudal fin. A dark, thin belt extends from the base of the second dorsal fin to the base of the anal fin. The scales of the belted cardinalfish have a toothed margin and are shed periodically. The eggs are carried in the mouth of the adult as they mature. The edibility of this species has been described as "poor".

== Distribution and habitat ==
Belted cardinalfish are marine fish. They are distributed through the Caribbean Sea, Gulf of Mexico, and in waters off of northeastern South America. They are found in waters from northern South America north to southern Florida, including Bermuda. Their range comprises the Antilles as well. Belted cardinalfish are found in rocky areas and reefs near drop-offs. They are often found near reefs at depths of 3 to 55 metres (9.8 to 180.4 ft). Belted cardinalfish inhabit caves and holes, and may be found among the spines of the long-spined urchin.
