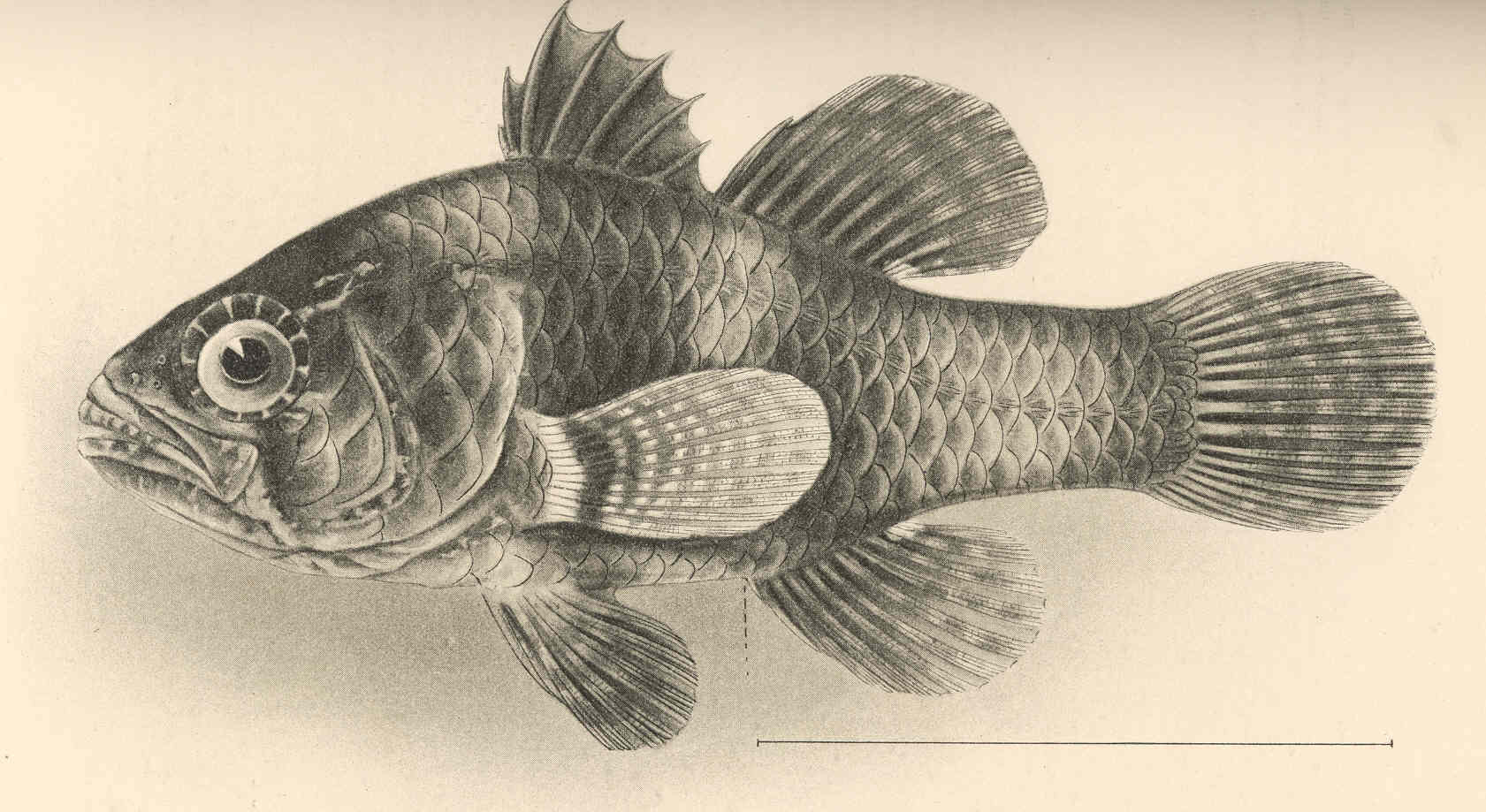
- Apogonichthys perdix

Scientific classification
- Kingdom: Animalia
- Phylum: Chordata
- Class: Actinopterygii
- Division: Teleostei
- Order: Gobiiformes
- Family: Apogonidae
- Subfamily: Apogoninae
- Genus: Apogonichthys; Bleeker, 1854

Type species
- Apogonichthys perdix Bleeker, 1854

= Apogonichthys =

Genus of fishes

Apogonichthys is a genus of cardinalfishes native to the Indian Ocean and the western Pacific Ocean.

== Species ==
The recognized species in this genus are:

- Apogonichthys ahimsa Whitley, 1959
- Apogonichthys ocellatus (M. C. W. Weber, 1913) (ocellated cardinalfish)
- Apogonichthys perdix Bleeker, 1854 (perdix cardinalfish)
- Apogonichthys waikiki Jordan & Evermann, 1903 (Waikiki cardinalfish)

FishBase also includes Apogonichthys landoni which Eschmeyer's Catalog of Fishes classifies as Foa landoni, but only recognises four species in total, with A. ahimsa as Apogonichthyoides chrysurus and A. waikiki synonymised with A. perdix.
