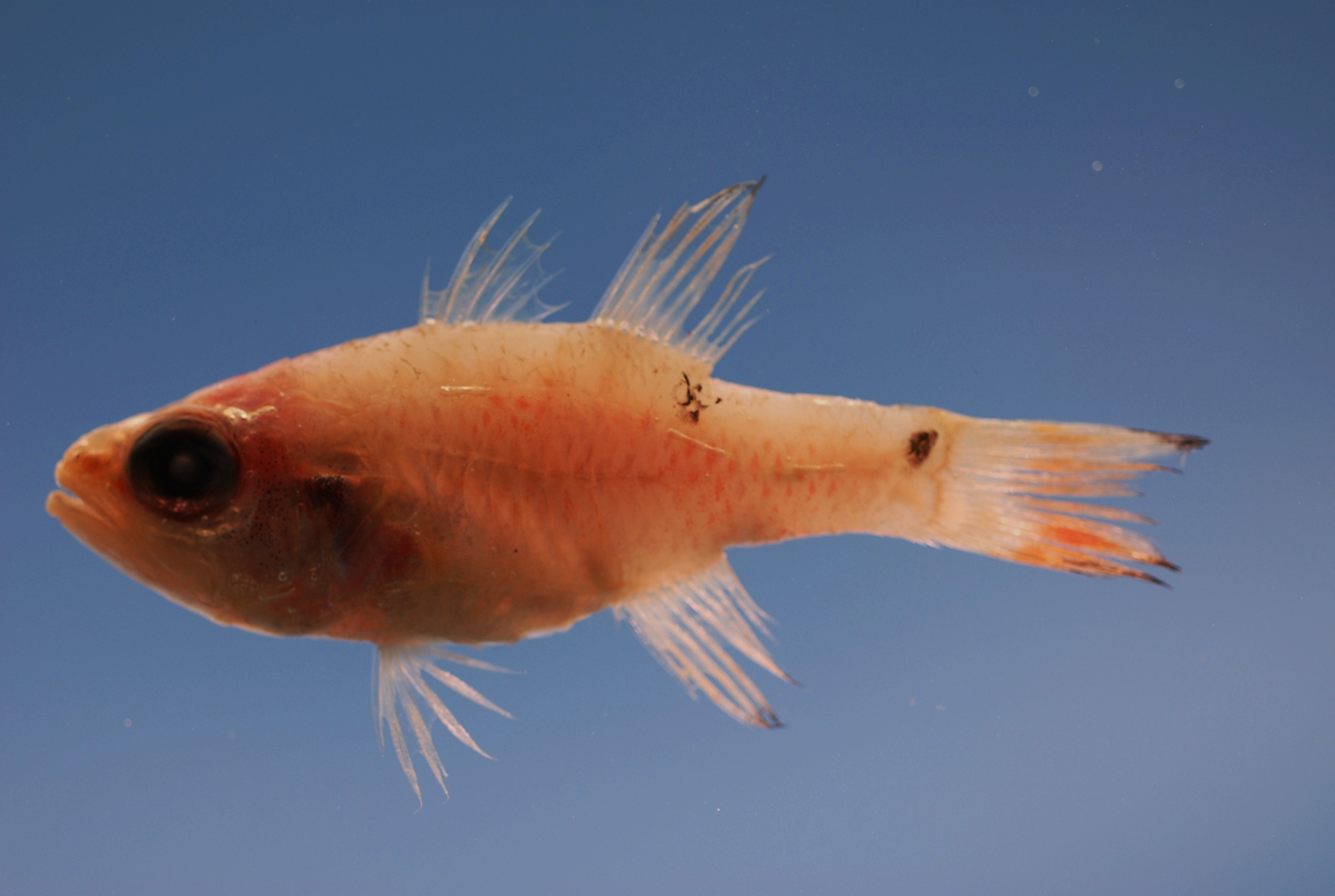

Conservation status
- Least Concern (IUCN 3.1)

Scientific classification
- Domain: Eukaryota
- Kingdom: Animalia
- Phylum: Chordata
- Class: Actinopterygii
- Order: Gobiiformes
- Family: Apogonidae
- Genus: Apogon
- Species: A. pseudomaculatus

Binomial name
- Apogon pseudomaculatus Longley, 1932

= Apogon pseudomaculatus =

Species of fish

The twospot cardinalfish (Apogon pseudomaculatus) is a species of fish in the family Apogonidae. It is found in the western Atlantic Ocean from southern Georgia to São Paulo, Brazil. A lionfish caught off Onslow Bay, North Carolina had a twospot cardinalfish in its gut contents and records from as far north as New England are most likely to be vagrants. It is also found in the eastern Atlantic from the islands of São Tomé and Príncipe in the Gulf of Guinea and Ascension Island. It is common on hard or semi-hard substrates of the continental shelf such as in harbours, around pilings and over sea walls and offshore to the outer reefs. It is a mouthbrooder. It is active at night and feeds on plankton.
