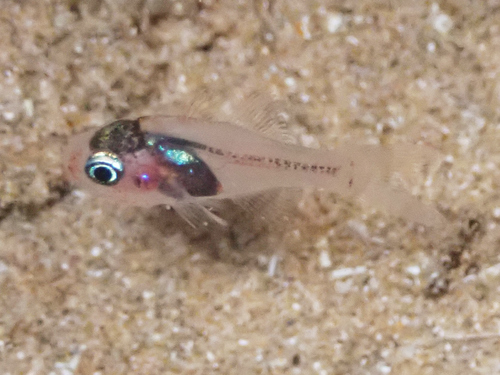

Scientific classification
- Kingdom: Animalia
- Phylum: Chordata
- Class: Actinopterygii
- Order: Gobiiformes
- Family: Apogonidae
- Genus: Apogon
- Species: A. erythrinus

Binomial name
- Apogon erythrinus Snyder, 1904

= Apogon erythrinus =

Species of fish

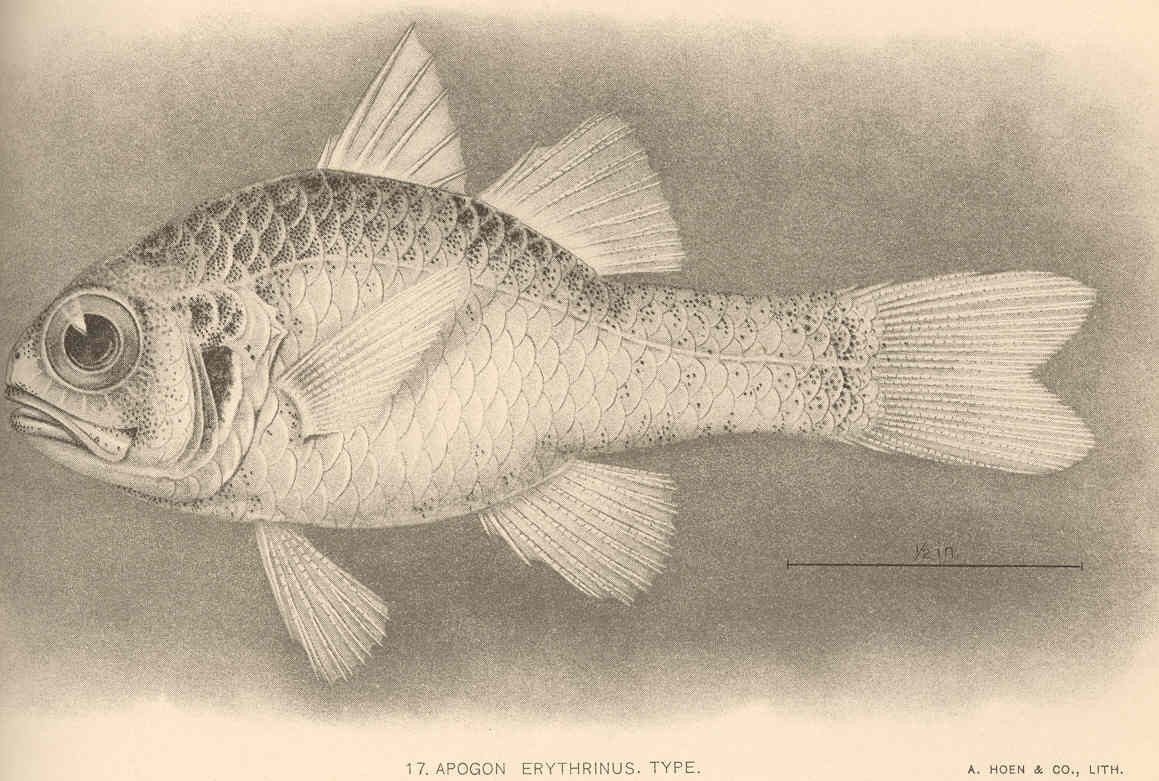
Apogon erythrinus

Apogon erythrinus, also called Hawaiian ruby cardinalfish, is a marine fish species endemic to Hawaii. It belongs to the family Apogonidae and the subfamily Apogoninae.

== Description ==
The Hawaiian ruby cardinalfish is a relatively small red fish with a somewhat transparent appearance. They can grow up to 1.57 in (4.0 cm). They have a second dorsal fin spine that reaches at least to the base of the third ray of their second dorsal fin when depressed, and they have 14 pectoral fin rays. They live for about four months.

== Distribution and habitat ==
The Hawaiian ruby cardinalfish is endemic to the Hawaiian islands. These fish are very shy, nocturnal, and prefer to hide in and patrol along holes and crevices.
