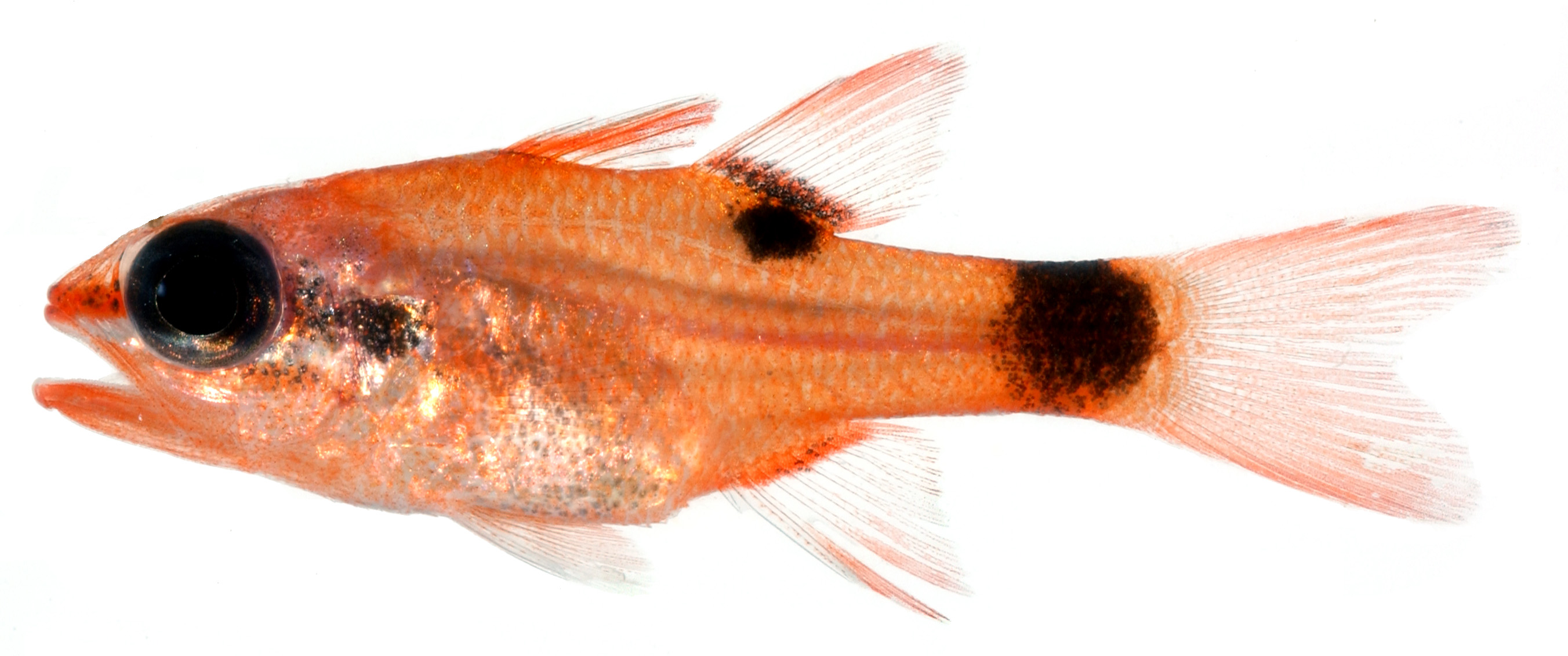
- A young Apogon maculatus

Conservation status
- Least Concern (IUCN 3.1)

Scientific classification
- Kingdom: Animalia
- Phylum: Chordata
- Class: Actinopterygii
- Division: Teleostei
- Order: Gobiiformes
- Family: Apogonidae
- Genus: Apogon
- Species: A. maculatus

Binomial name
- Apogon maculatus Poey, 1860

= Apogon maculatus =

Species of fish

Apogon maculatus, commonly known as the flamefish, is a species of cardinalfish from the Western Atlantic. The flamefish is nocturnal and typically hides in shadowy areas. It is also known as cardenal manchado or the spotted cardinalfish.

== Description ==
The flamefish can grow to a size of 6–11.1 cm (2.4–4.4 in), depending on its environment. The body of the flamefish is reddish-orange with small spots of black, and a large dark area on its tail. The color combination is similar to fire, which gives the fish its name. A long black stripe is present on the fish's snout. Within the flamefish's scales, there are small comb-like spines for protection and flexibility. Additionally, it has pre-dorsal scales that protect its gills. The flamefish also has around 11-13 pectoral fins that help in changing direction and speed.

== Distribution ==
The flamefish is usually found in the waters of the Western Atlantic Ocean. It primarily resides near the Gulf of Mexico, Florida, and the Caribbeans. However, the flamefish has also been reported in Canada, Massachusetts, Bermuda, the Bahamas, and Brazil.

== Habitat ==
Due to its small size, the flamefish hides from predators within coral reefs. Since coral reefs have abundant resources, they have become a popular mating site for flamefish.

== Breeding ==
The flamefish participates in oral brooding or oral incubation. After the female lays eggs, a male will fertilize them and keep the eggs in its mouth. Although, the male flamefish's mouth is relatively protective, stress may decrease its parental care.

== Human use ==
In captivity the fish's color tends to fade unless it's fed color enhancing vitamins. It grows to a size of 11 centimetres (4.3 inches) in captivity. This fish can be aggressive towards other cardinalfish. Only one should be kept in a tank, unless it is a mated pairs. Two flamefish are suggested to be placed in a 55-imperial-gallon (250 L; 66 US gal) or larger tank. Otherwise it does well with peaceful tank mates as long as it has caves and places to hide. The ideal water conditions are temperatures of 72–78 °F (22–26 °C), with a pH of 8.1 to 8.4, sg 1.020–1.025, and dKH at 8 to 12. The flamefish occasionally makes its way into the aquarium trade because of its uniqueness.

The flamefish thrives in aquariums with only fish. Rocks and hiding areas are necessary to help the flamefish feel safe. If felt threatened by another tank fish, the flamefish may remain dormant by hiding during the day. In captivity, the flamefish eats minced crustaceans and clams daily. Some suggest that the flamefish should be fed in the early morning and evening.
