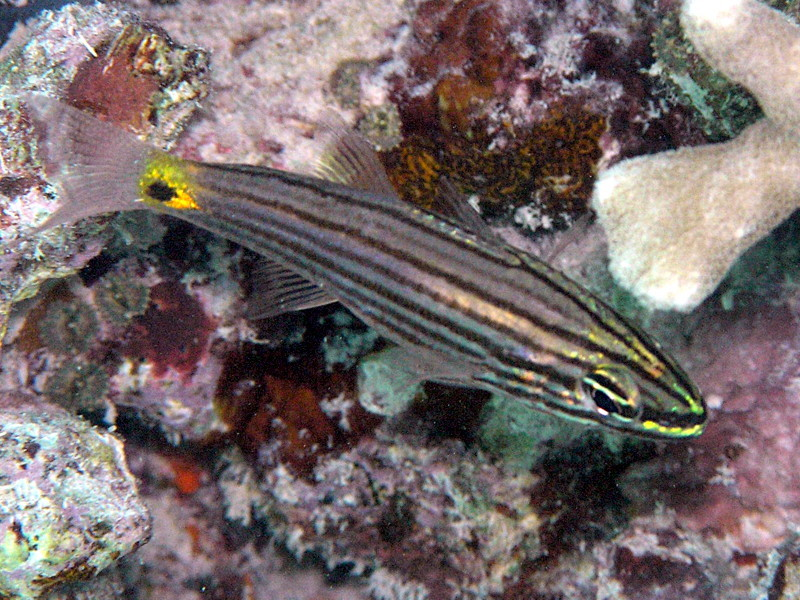
- Cheilodipterus artus
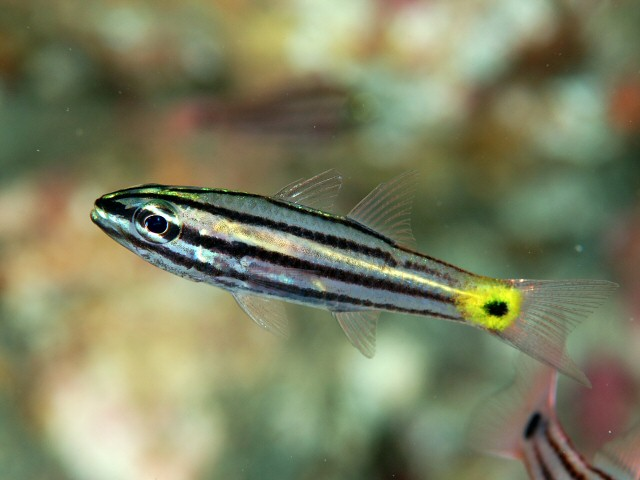
- Cheilodipterus intermedius

Scientific classification
- Kingdom: Animalia
- Phylum: Chordata
- Class: Actinopterygii
- Division: Teleostei
- Order: Gobiiformes
- Family: Apogonidae
- Subfamily: Apogoninae
- Genus: Cheilodipterus; Lacépède, 1801

Type species
- Cheilodipterus lineatus Lacépède, 1801

= Cheilodipterus =

Genus of fishes

Cheilodipterus is a genus of fishes in the family Apogonidae, the cardinalfishes. They are native to the Indian Ocean and the western Pacific Ocean.

== Species ==
The 19 recognized species in this genus are:

- Cheilodipterus alleni Gon, 1993 (Allen's cardinalfish)
- Cheilodipterus arabicus (Gmelin, 1789) (tiger cardinalfish)
- Cheilodipterus artus J. L. B. Smith, 1961 (wolf cardinalfish)
- Cheilodipterus heptazona Bleeker, 1849
- Cheilodipterus intermedius Gon, 1993 (intermediate cardinalfish)
- Cheilodipterus isostigma (L. P. Schultz, 1940) (dog-toothed cardinalfish)
- Cheilodipterus lachneri Klausewitz, 1959 (Aqaba cardinalfish)
- Cheilodipterus lineatus Lacépède, 1801
- Cheilodipterus macrodon (Lacépède, 1802) (large-toothed cardinalfish)
- Cheilodipterus nigrotaeniatus H. M. Smith & Radcliffe, 1912
- Cheilodipterus novemstriatus (Rüppell, 1838) (Indian Ocean two-spot cardinalfish)
- Cheilodipterus octovittatus G. Cuvier, 1828
- Cheilodipterus parazonatus Gon, 1993 (mimic cardinalfish)
- Cheilodipterus persicus Gon, 1993 (Persian cardinalfish)
- Cheilodipterus pygmaios Gon, 1993
- Cheilodipterus quinquelineatus G. Cuvier, 1828 (five-lined cardinalfish)
- Cheilodipterus singapurensis Bleeker, 1860 (truncated cardinalfish)
- Cheilodipterus subulatus M. C. W. Weber, 1909
- Cheilodipterus zonatus H. M. Smith & Radcliffe, 1912 (yellowbelly cardinalfish)
