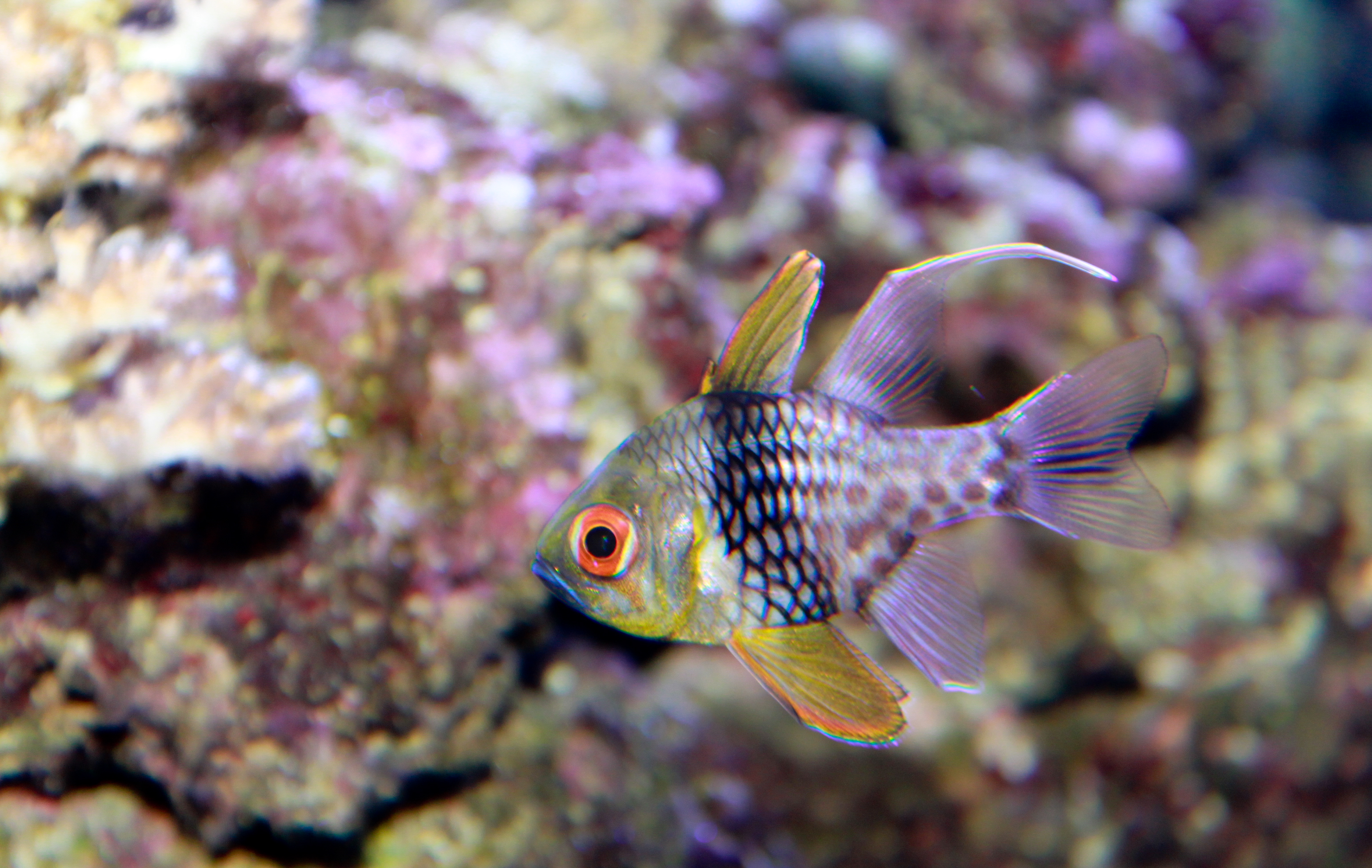

Conservation status
- Least Concern (IUCN 3.1)

Scientific classification
- Kingdom: Animalia
- Phylum: Chordata
- Class: Actinopterygii
- Order: Gobiiformes
- Family: Apogonidae
- Genus: Sphaeramia
- Species: S. nematoptera

Binomial name
- Sphaeramia nematoptera (Bleeker, 1856)

Synonyms
- Apogon nematopterus Bleeker, 1856

= Sphaeramia nematoptera =

Pajama cardinalfish

Species of fish

The pajama cardinalfish, spotted cardinalfish, coral cardinalfish, or polkadot cardinalfish (Sphaeramia nematoptera) is a species of fish belonging to the family Apogonidae. It is a popular aquarium fish. It grows to a total length around 8.5 cm (3.3 in) and features distinctive red eyes and a broad, dark, vertical 'waistband' with scattered red spots toward the tail. It is considered to be of low vulnerability, and is distributed throughout much of the western Pacific Ocean, from Java to Fiji, and from the Ryukyu Islands south to the Great Barrier Reef. The male pajama cardinalfish incubates the eggs in his mouth until they hatch.

== Description ==
Pajama cardinalfish display a rainbow of colors. They have greenish-yellow faces, bright orange eyes, and silver-based bodies dressed with a bold black scalar margin and posteriors dotted with orange polka dots. Though their bold coloration may stand out, S. nematoptera fish have a peaceful nature that lets them blend perfectly into most community saltwater aquaria. Like many other schooling fish, pajama cardinalfish form a strict hierarchy when kept in small groups within the aquarium. However, unlike some social fish, this member of the family Apogonidae does not use aggression to exert dominance over other cardinalfish.

== Reproduction ==
Sphaeramia nematoptera is socially monogamous, meaning that any individual male fish will form a long-term bond with just a single female. The two fish stay close to one another and mate with each other for several breeding cycles, though extra-pair fertilizations have been observed in the species. If one partner dies or is otherwise removed, the widowed fish is likely to form another bond. Both males and females prefer to mate with fish that are of similar size to themselves.

Copulation occurs year-round and throughout the day, but is more common at night. While mating, the two fish may become aggressive towards conspecifics. To mate, the female will deposit eggs directly into the water column. Then, the male will quickly fertilize the eggs and scoop them into its mouth. Like other cardinalfish, male Sphaeramia nematoptera are mouthbrooders; holding the fertilized eggs in their mouths for 8–31 days. This practice occurs even if the eggs are not all related to the male (though this is uncommon). In these cases, the male will be carrying an average of 18% of genetically unrelated eggs. Both males and females have been recorded to mate outside their bonded pair, leading to males carrying eggs from multiple partners. In total, only around 70% of all egg clutches will be the result of monogamy with bonded social partners.

== Gallery ==
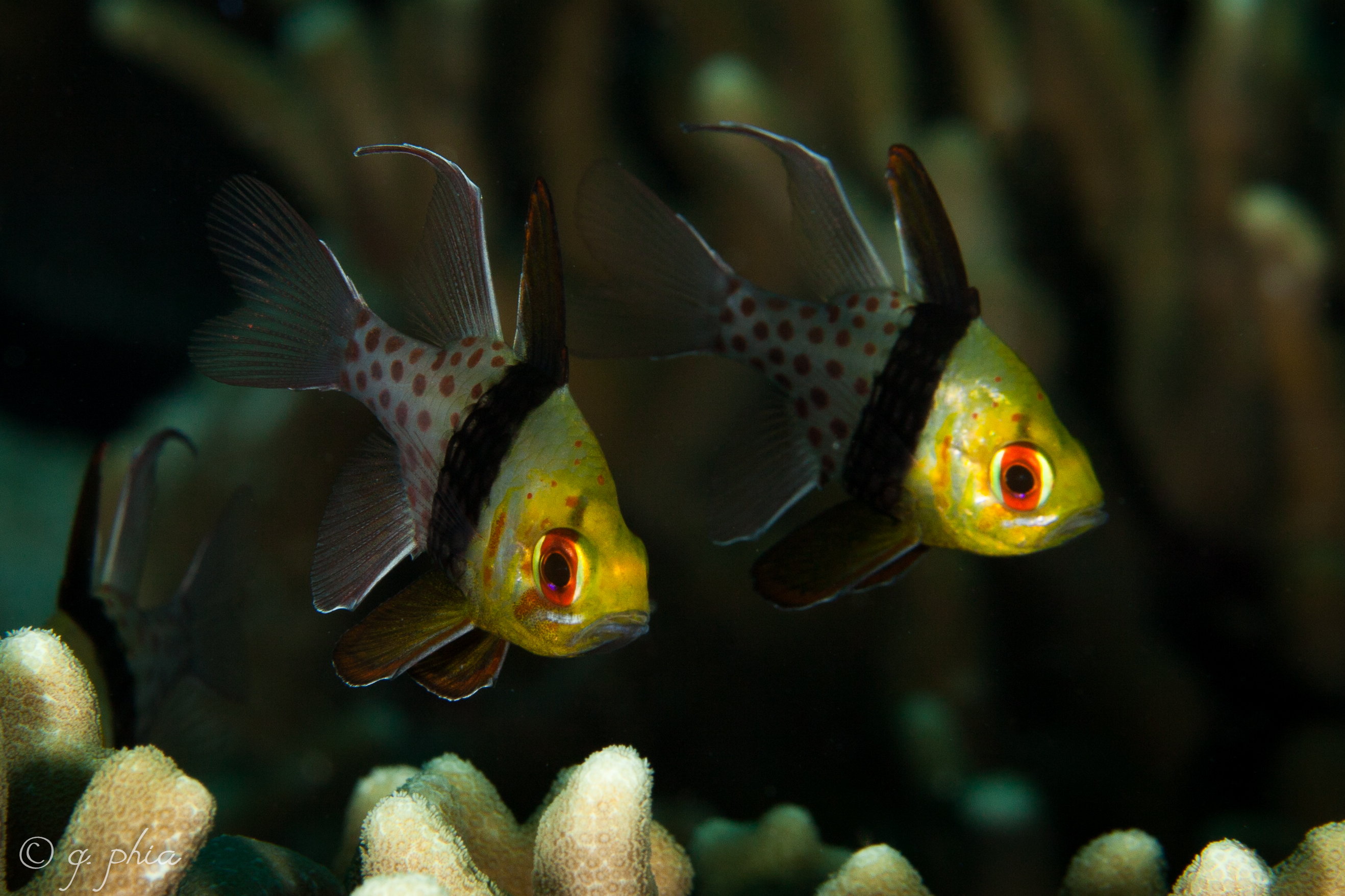
Pyjama cardinal twins at Wakatobi National Park Indonesia, 2016

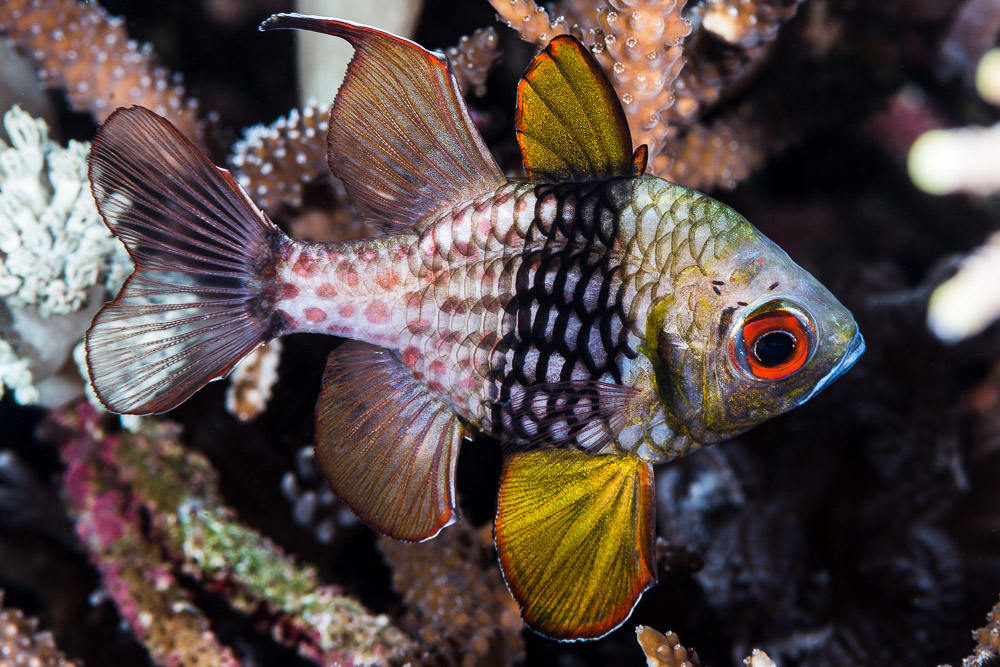
Pajama Cardinalfish at South Komodo Island, Indonesia, 2015

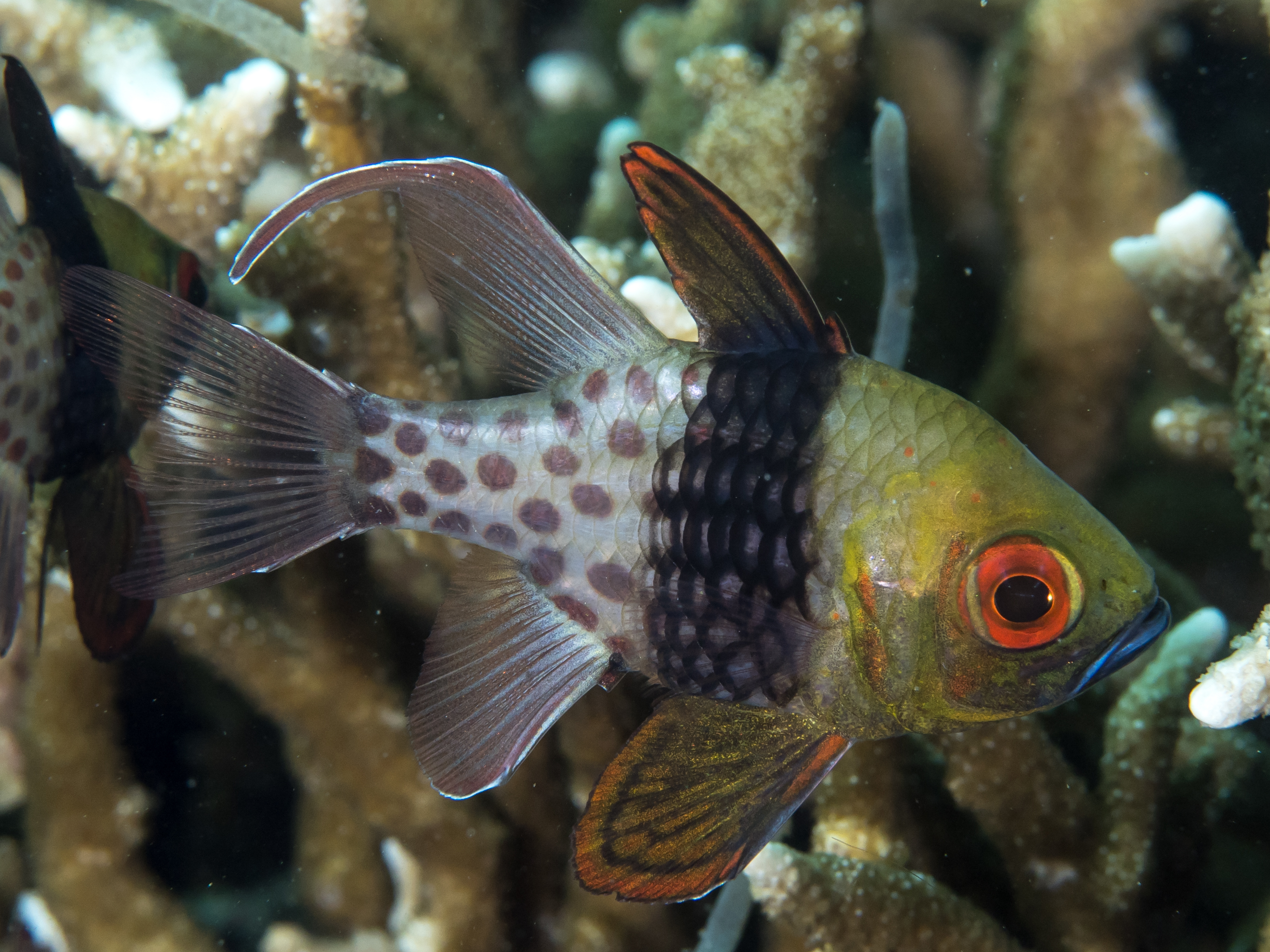
Pajama Cardinalfish at Lembeh, Indonesia, 2018
