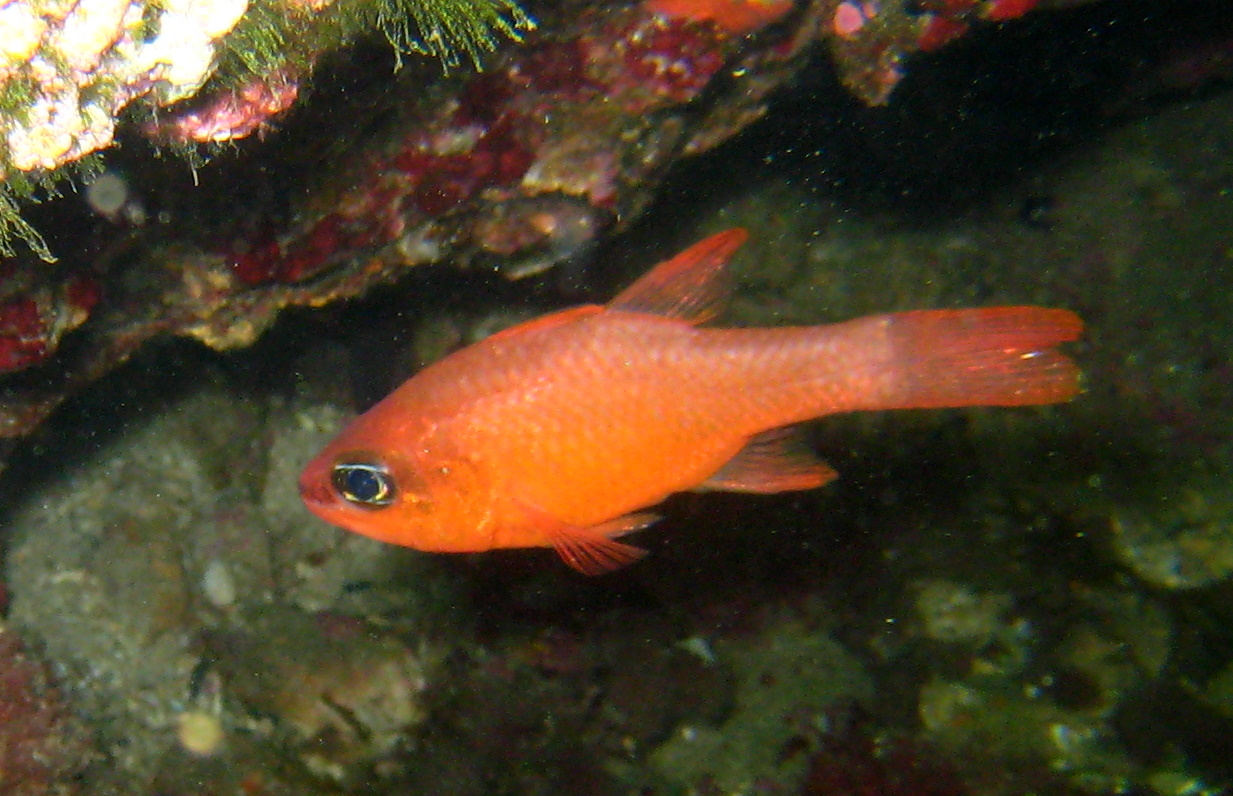

Conservation status
- Least Concern (IUCN 3.1)

Scientific classification
- Kingdom: Animalia
- Phylum: Chordata
- Class: Actinopterygii
- Division: Teleostei
- Order: Gobiiformes
- Family: Apogonidae
- Genus: Apogon
- Species: A. imberbis

Binomial name
- Apogon imberbis (Linnaeus, 1758)

Synonyms
- Apogon rexmullorum Cuvier, 1828; Apogon ruber Lacépède, 1801; Kuhlia rubens (Spinola, 1807); Amia imberbis (Linnaeus, 1758); Mullus imberbis Linnaeus, 1758

= Apogon imberbis =

Species of fish

Apogon imberbis, the cardinalfish, the Mediterranean cardinalfish or king of the mullets, is a species of ray-finned fish, a cardinalfish belonging to the family Apogonidae. It is widely distributed in the Mediterranean and along the warm temperate and tropical eastern Atlantic coasts from Portugal south to the Gulf of Guinea.

== Description ==
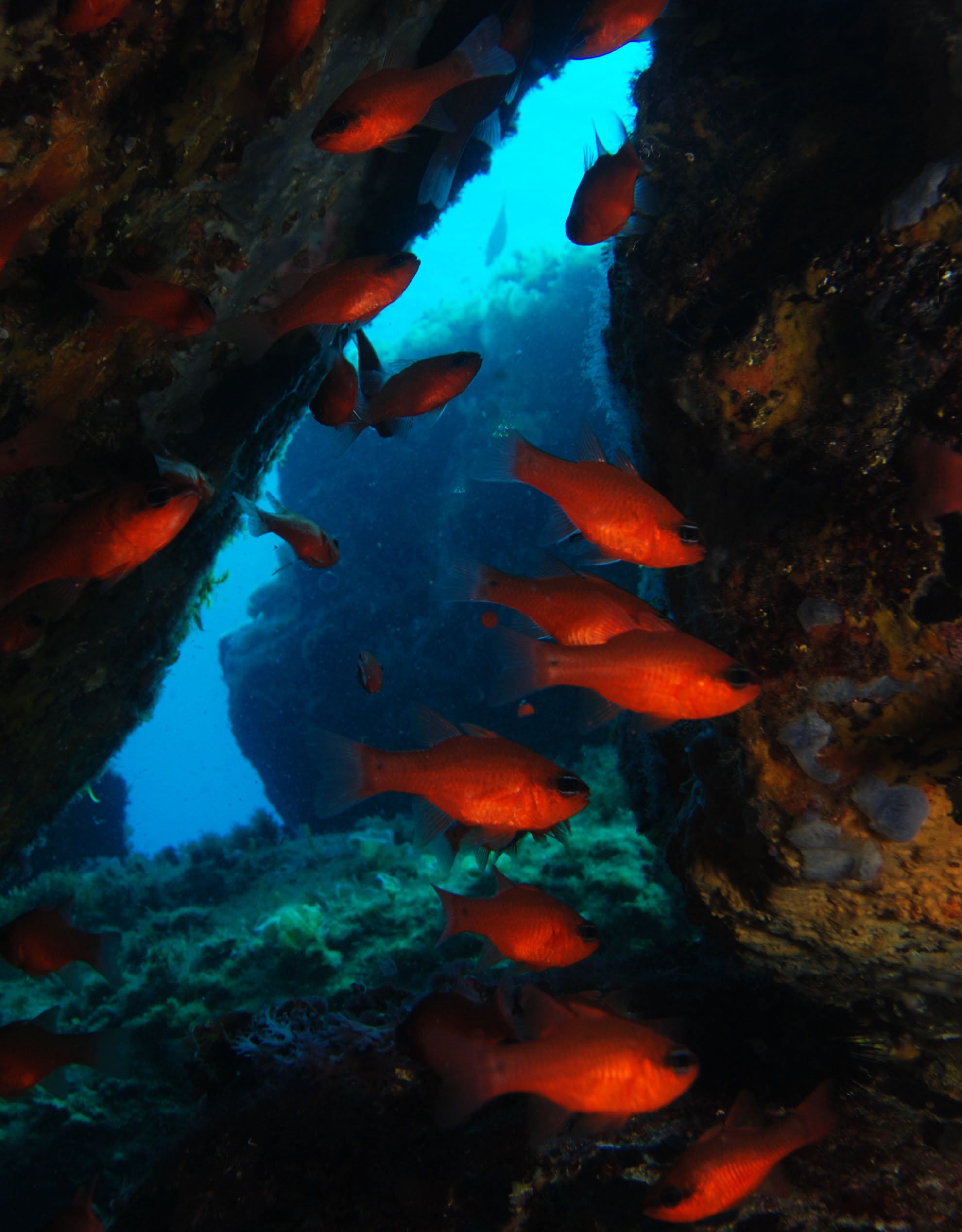
School of A. imberbis

Apogon imberbis has a compressed, ovate body with a large head and a very large eye head large which is much larger than the snout. It has a large, oblique mouth with a protruding lower jaw, which contains rows of small villiform teeth on the mandible, palatine and vomer. The preopercular margin is only slightly serrated and the preopercular ridge is smooth. The pectoral fin is long, reaching to at least the origin of anal fin and the caudal fin shows slight emargination. The scales are large and ctenoid in form, and the lateral line numbers 22-30 scales. The body and fins are coloured red or pink, duskier on the back and upper surface of head. There are two or three dark spots, which are occasionally joined, along base of caudal fin. The maximum recorded size is 15 cm standard length, although 10–12 cm is more usual. The two dorsal fins have a total of 7 spines and 9-10 soft rays 9-10; the anal fin has 2 spines and 8-9 soft rays.

== Distribution ==
Apogon imberbis is widely distributed in the eastern Atlantic from Gibraltar and southern Portugal to Angola and includes the Canary Islands, Madeira, Azores, Cape Verde Islands and the islands of the Gulf of Guinea. It is found throughout the Mediterranean Sea but does not extend north into the Black Sea.

== Biology ==
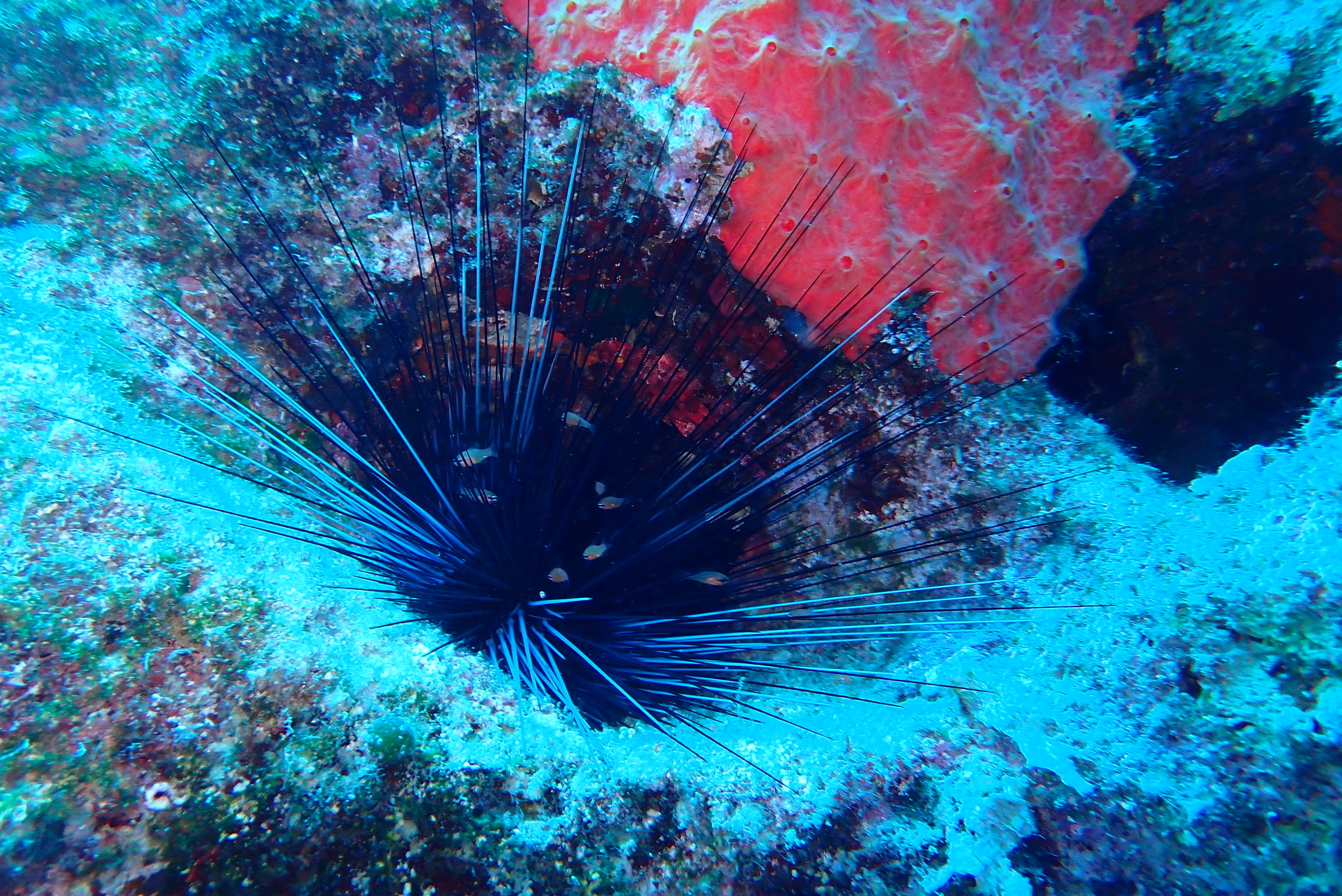
Young A. imberbis amongst the spines of a sea urchin, in Crete

Apogon imberbis is frequently found on rocky reefs as well as artificial structured reefs from 2-20m in depth. In a study in southern Italy, especially where there are rocky cliffs and caves. It feeds on small fish, invertebrates and plankton. In the Atlantic, A. imberbis associates with coral and rocky reefs. It is nocturnal and spends the day in cavities or caves either individually or in groups. They can often be abundant on artificial reefs, especially in the Mediterranean.

A. imberbis breed in June to September, it is a mouthbrooding fish, after internal fertilisation of the eggs the male broods the balls of eggs in his mouth. They are commonly found from two to 20 m depth and are also known to school in large numbers. In winter they appear to move to deeper waters.

== Uses ==
Apogon imberbis is occasionally used as bait for hook and line fishing but in some parts of its range it is consumed by humans. It is occasionally traded in the aquarium trade.
