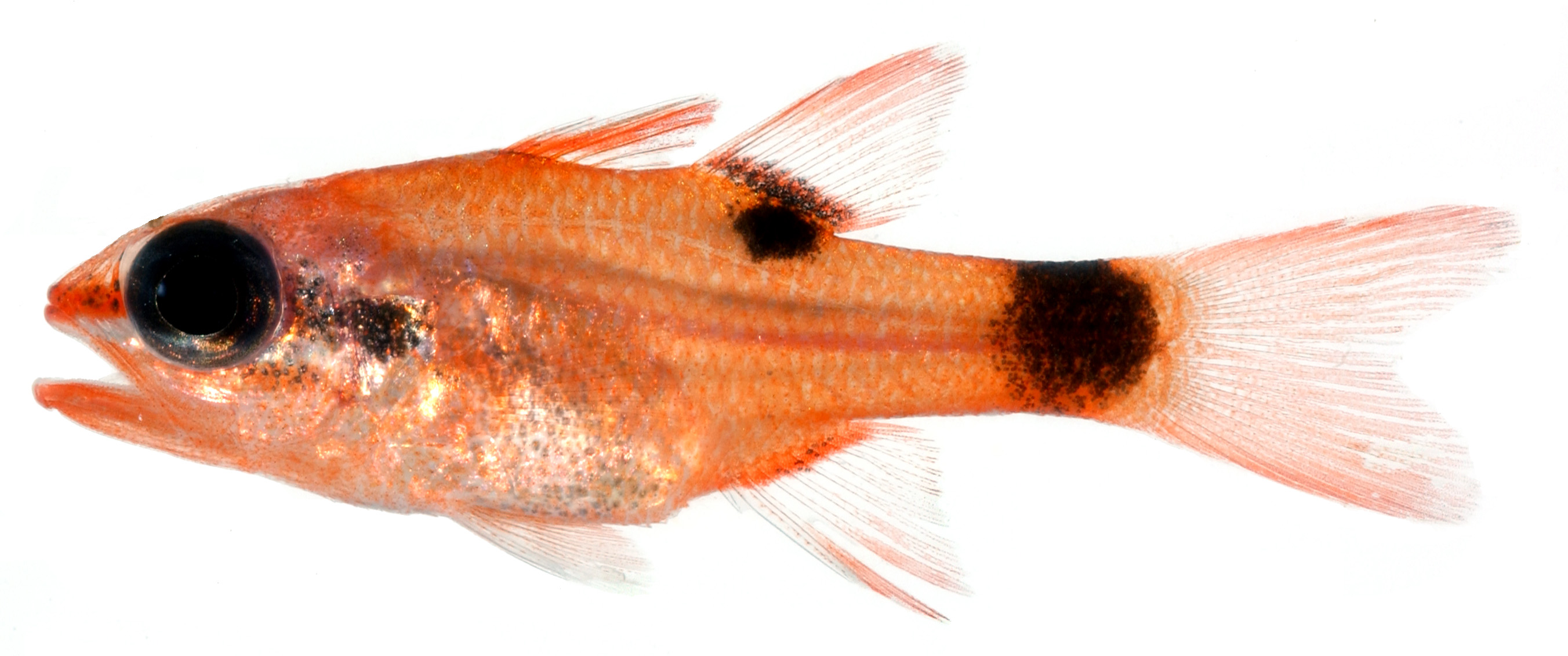
- Apogon maculatus

Scientific classification
- Kingdom: Animalia
- Phylum: Chordata
- Class: Actinopterygii
- Division: Teleostei
- Order: Gobiiformes
- Family: Apogonidae
- Subfamily: Apogoninae
- Genus: Apogon; Lacépède, 1801

Type species
- Apogon ruber Lacépède, 1801

= Apogon =

Apogon Temporal range: 55–0 Ma Eocene to present

Genus of fishes

Apogon is a large genus of fish in the family Apogonidae, the cardinalfishes. They are among the most common fish on coral reefs. Over 200 species have been classified in genus Apogon as members of several subgenera. Some of these subgenera, such as Ostorhinchus, have been elevated to genus status, leaving just over 50 species in the genus.

== Species ==
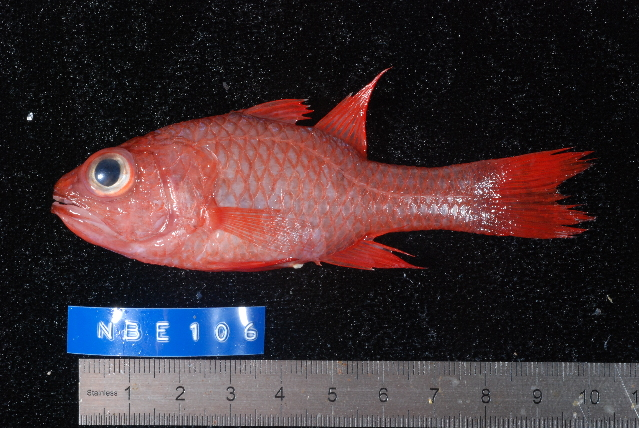
A. caudicinctus

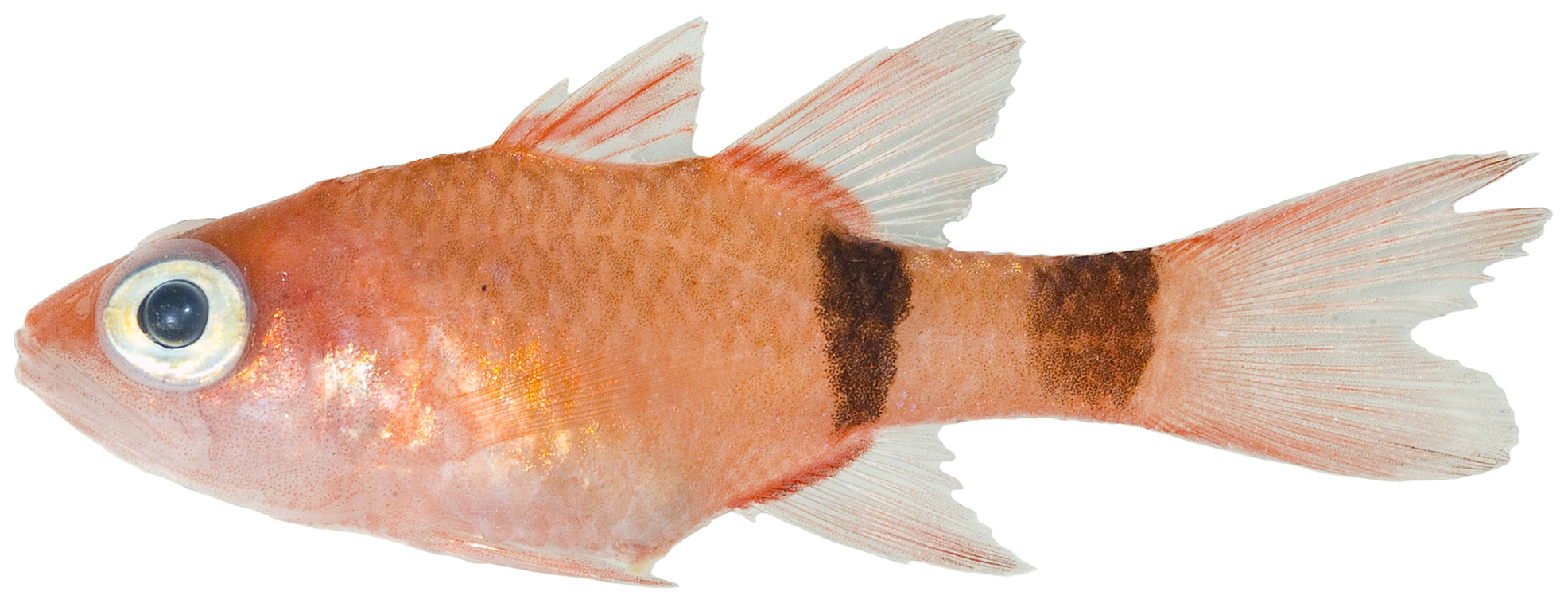
A. robinsi

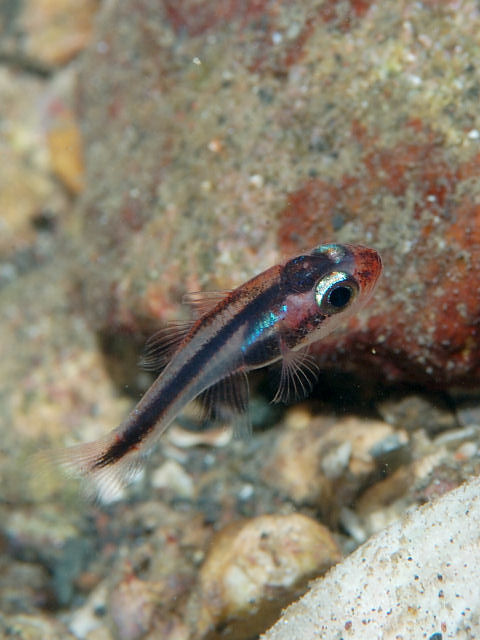
A. semiornatus

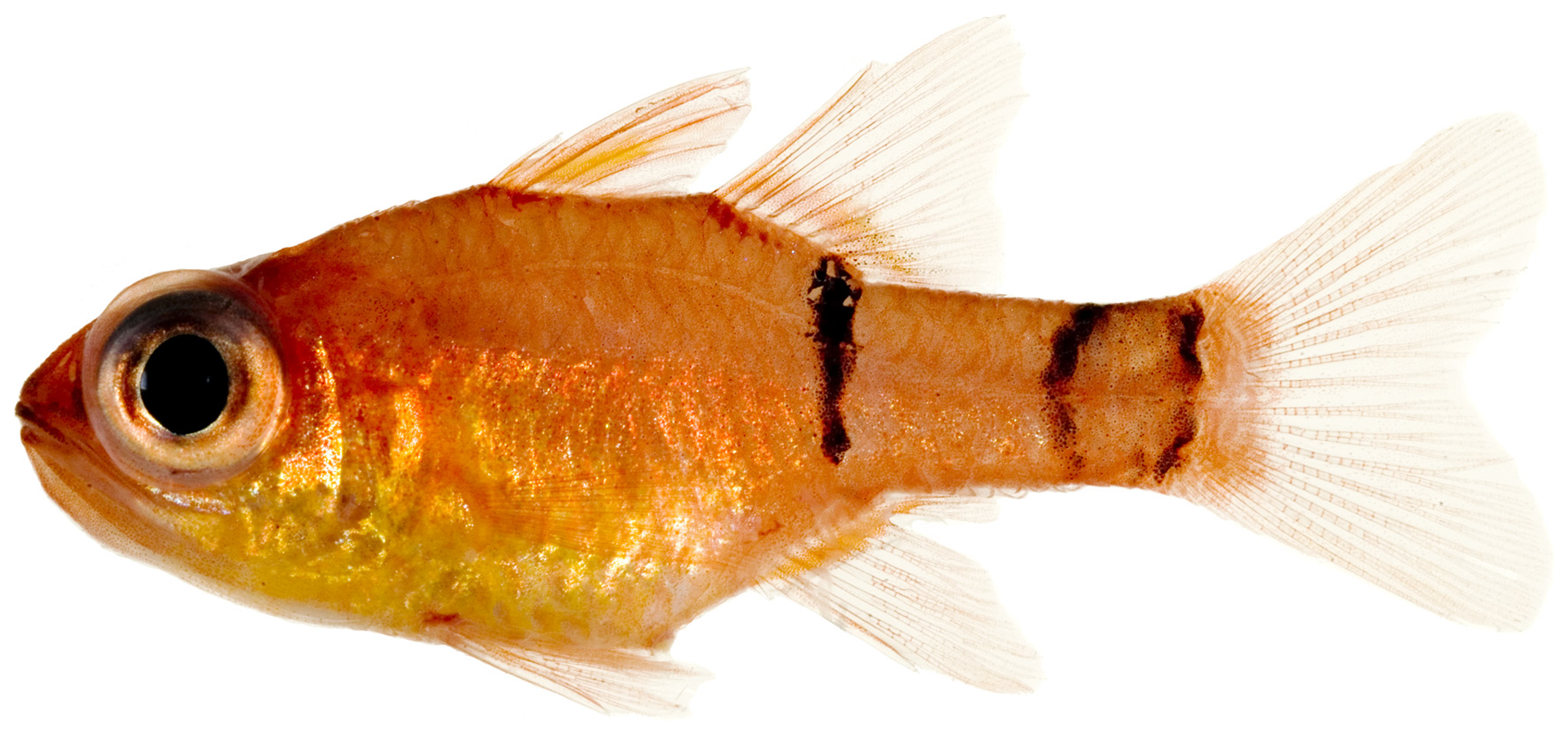
A. townsendi

The 50 recognized species in this genus are:

- A. americanus Castelnau, 1855 (Brazilian flamefish)
- A. atradorsatus Heller & Snodgrass, 1903 (blacktip cardinalfish)
- A. atricaudus D. S. Jordan & E. A. McGregor, 1898 (plain cardinalfish)
- A. aurolineatus (Mowbray, 1927) (bridle cardinalfish)
- A. axillaris Valenciennes, 1832 (axillary-spot cardinalfish)
- A. binotatus (Poey, 1867) (barred cardinalfish)
- A. campbelli J. L. B. Smith, 1949
- A. cardinalis Seale, 1910
- A. caudicinctus J. E. Randall & C. L. Smith, 1988 (little tailband cardinalfish)
- A. coccineus Rüppell, 1838 (ruby cardinalfish)
- A. crassiceps Garman, 1903 (transparent cardinalfish)
- A. dammermani M. C. W. Weber & de Beaufort, 1929
- A. deetsie J. E. Randall, 1998 (Deetsie's cardinalfish)
- A. dianthus T. H. Fraser & J. E. Randall, 2002
- A. doryssa (D. S. Jordan & Seale, 1906) (longspine cardinalfish)
- A. dovii Günther, 1862 (tailspot cardinalfish)
- A. erythrinus Snyder, 1904 (Hawaiian ruby cardinalfish)
- A. erythrosoma Gon & J. E. Randall, 2003
- A. gouldi Smith-Vaniz, 1977 (deepwater cardinalfish)
- A. guadalupensis (R. C. Osburn & Nichols, 1916) (Guadalupe cardinalfish)
- A. hypselonotus Bleeker, 1855
- A. imberbis (Linnaeus, 1758) (cardinalfish)
- A. indicus D. W. Greenfield, 2001 (Indian cardinalfish)
- A. kautamea D. W. Greenfield & J. E. Randall, 2004 (Rapanui cardinalfish)
- A. kominatoensis Ebina, 1935
- A. lachneri J. E. Böhlke, 1959 (whitestar cardinalfish)
- A. lativittatus J. E. Randall, 2001
- A. leptocaulus C. R. Gilbert, 1972 (slendertail cardinalfish)
- A. maculatus (Poey, 1860) (flamefish)
- A. marquesensis D. W. Greenfield], 2001
- A. mosavi Dale, 1977 (dwarf cardinalfish)
- A. pacificus (Herre, 1935) (pink cardinalfish)
- A. phenax J. E. Böhlke & J. E. Randall, 1968 (mimic cardinalfish)
- A. pillionatus J. E. Böhlke & J. E. Randall, 1968 (broadsaddle cardinalfish)
- A. planifrons Longley & Hildebrand, 1940 (pale cardinalfish)
- A. posterofasciatus G. R. Allen & J. E. Randall, 2002 (rearbar cardinalfish)
- A. pseudomaculatus Longley, 1932 (twospot cardinalfish)
- A. quadrisquamatus Longley, 1934 (sawcheek cardinalfish)
- A. retrosella (T. N. Gill, 1862) (barspot cardinalfish)
- A. robbyi C. R. Gilbert & J. C. Tyler, 1997 (striped cardinalfish)
- A. robinsi J. E. Böhlke & J. E. Randall, 1968 (roughlip cardinalfish)
- A. rubellus (J. L. B. Smith], 1961)
- A. rubrifuscus D. W. Greenfield & J. E. Randall, 2004 (flathead cardinalfish)
- A. seminigracaudus D. W. Greenfield, 2007 (darktail cardinalfish)
- A. semiornatus W. K. H. Peters, 1876 (oblique-banded cardinalfish)
- A. susanae D. W. Greenfield, 2001
- A. talboti J. L. B. Smith, 1961 (flame cardinalfish)
- A. townsendi (Breder, 1927) (belted cardinalfish)
- A. tricinctus G. R. Allen & Erdmann, 2012 (threeband cardinalfish)
- A. unicolor Steindachner & Döderlein (de), 1883 (big red cardinalfish)
