= Fish jaw =

Element of fish anatomy

External videos
- Video of a slingjaw wrasse catching prey by protruding its jaw
- Video of a red bay snook catching prey by suction feeding

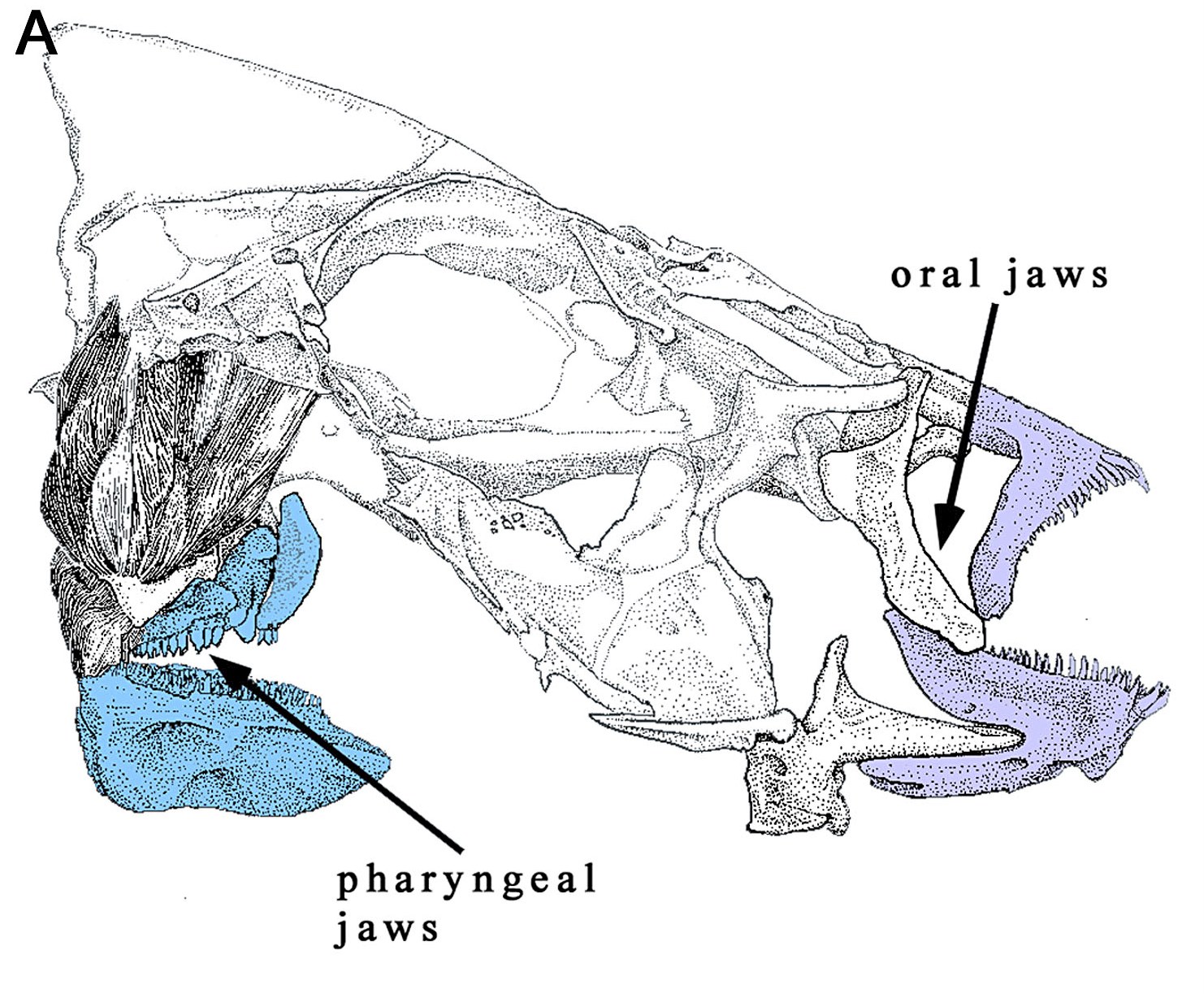
Skull of a generalized cichlid, showing a lateral view of the oral jaws (purple) and the pharyngeal jaws (blue)

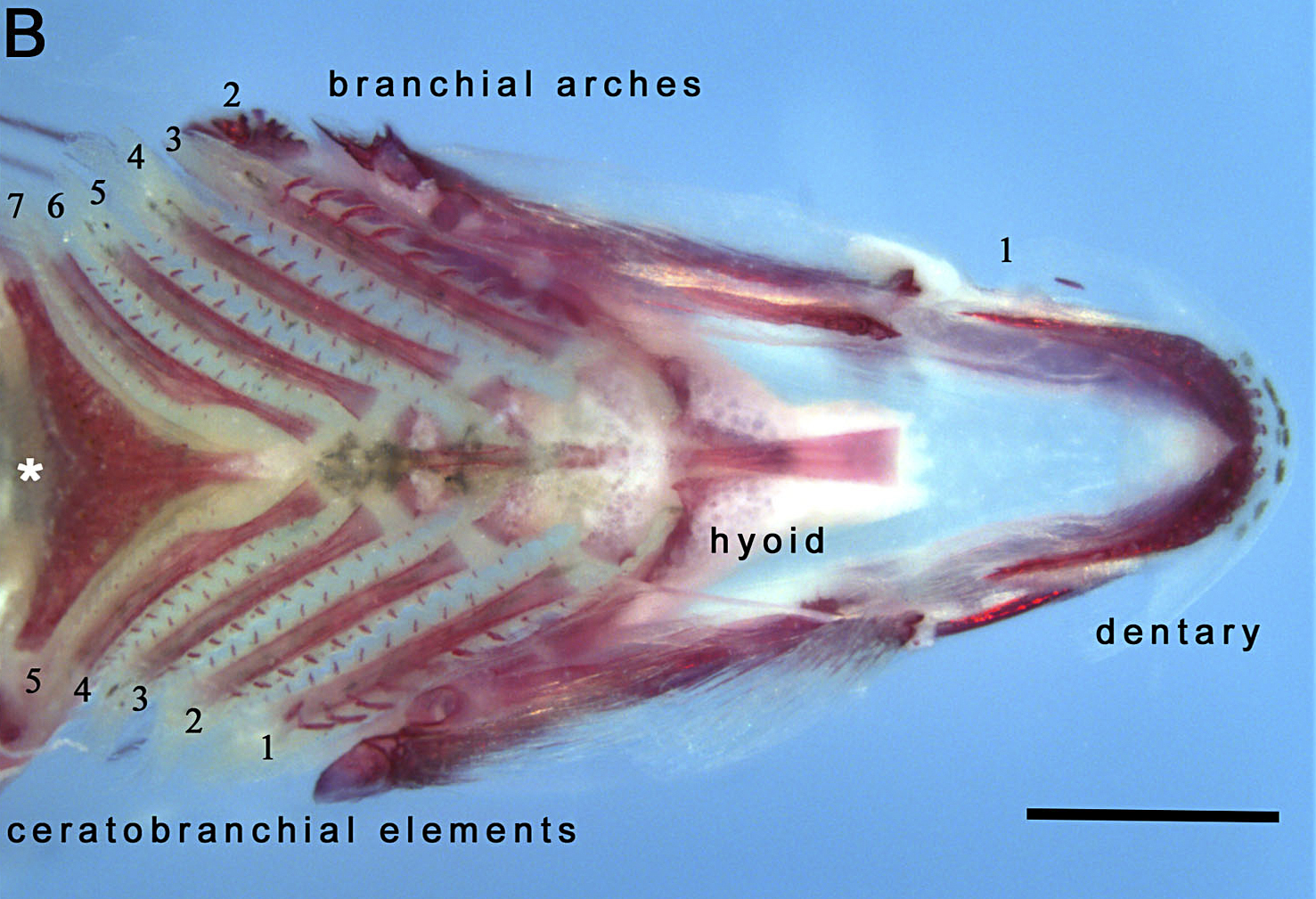
Dorsal view of the lower pharyngeal and oral jaws of a juvenile Malawi eyebiter showing the branchial (pharyngeal) arches and ceratobrachial elements (arch bones). The white asterisk indicates the toothed pharyngeal jaw. Scale bar represents 500 μm.

Most bony fishes have two sets of jaws made mainly of bone. The primary oral jaws open and close the mouth, and a second set of pharyngeal jaws are positioned at the back of the throat. The oral jaws are used to capture and manipulate prey by biting and crushing. The pharyngeal jaws, so-called because they are positioned within the pharynx, are used to further process the food and move it from the mouth to the stomach.

Cartilaginous fishes, such as sharks and rays, have one set of oral jaws made mainly of cartilage. They do not have pharyngeal jaws. Generally jaws are articulated and oppose vertically, comprising an upper jaw and a lower jaw and can bear numerous ordered teeth. Cartilaginous fishes grow multiple sets (polyphyodont) and replace teeth as they wear by moving new teeth laterally from the medial jaw surface in a conveyor-belt fashion. Teeth are replaced multiple times also in most bony fishes, but unlike cartilaginous fishes, the new tooth erupts only after the old one has fallen out.

Jaws probably originated in the pharyngeal arches supporting the gills of jawless fish. The earliest jaws appeared in now extinct placoderms and spiny sharks during the Silurian, about 430 million years ago. The original selective advantage offered by the jaw was probably not related to feeding, but to increased respiration efficiency—the jaws were used in the buccal pump to pump water across the gills. The familiar use of jaws for feeding would then have developed as a secondary function before becoming the primary function in many vertebrates. All vertebrate jaws, including the human jaw, evolved from early fish jaws. The appearance of the early vertebrate jaw has been described as "perhaps the most profound and radical evolutionary step in the vertebrate history". Fish without jaws had more difficulty surviving than fish with jaws, and most jawless fish became extinct.

Jaws use linkage mechanisms. These linkages can be especially common and complex in the head of bony fishes, such as wrasses, which have evolved many specialized feeding mechanisms. Especially advanced are the linkage mechanisms of jaw protrusion. For suction feeding a system of linked four-bar linkages is responsible for the coordinated opening of the mouth and the three-dimensional expansion of the buccal cavity. The four-bar linkage is also responsible for protrusion of the premaxilla, leading to three main four-bar linkage systems to generally describe the lateral and anterior expansion of the buccal cavity in fishes. The most thorough overview of the different types of linkages in animals has been provided by M. Muller, who also designed a new classification system, which is especially well suited for biological systems.

== Skull ==
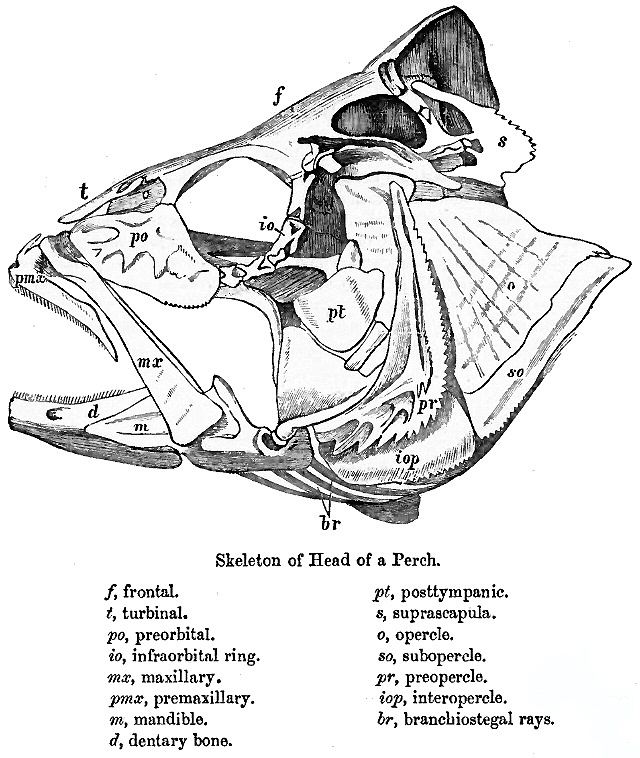

The skull of fishes is formed from a series of loosely connected bones. Lampreys and sharks only possess a cartilaginous endocranium, with both the upper and lower jaws being separate elements. Bony fishes have additional dermal bone, forming a more or less coherent skull roof in lungfish and holost fish.

The simpler structure is found in jawless fish, in which the cranium is represented by a trough-like basket of cartilaginous elements only partially enclosing the brain, and associated with the capsules for the inner ears and the single nostril.

Cartilaginous fish, such as sharks, also have simple skulls. The cranium is a single structure forming a case around the brain, enclosing the lower surface and the sides, but always at least partially open at the top as a large fontanelle. The most anterior part of the cranium includes a forward plate of cartilage, the rostrum, and capsules to enclose the olfactory organs. Behind these are the orbits, and then an additional pair of capsules enclosing the structure of the inner ear. Finally, the skull tapers towards the rear, where the foramen magnum lies immediately above a single condyle, articulating with the first vertebra. There are, in addition, at various points throughout the cranium, smaller foramina for the cranial nerves. The jaws consist of separate hoops of cartilage, almost always distinct from the cranium proper.

In ray-finned fishes, there has also been considerable modification from the primitive pattern. The roof of the skull is generally well formed, and although the exact relationship of its bones to those of tetrapods is unclear, they are usually given similar names for convenience. Other elements of the skull, however, may be reduced; there is little cheek region behind the enlarged orbits, and little, if any bone in between them. The upper jaw is often formed largely from the premaxilla, with the maxilla itself located further back, and an additional bone, the symplectic, linking the jaw to the rest of the cranium.

Although the skulls of fossil lobe-finned fish resemble those of the early tetrapods, the same cannot be said of those of the living lungfishes. The skull roof is not fully formed, and consists of multiple, somewhat irregularly shaped bones with no direct relationship to those of tetrapods. The upper jaw is formed from the pterygoids and vomers alone, all of which bear teeth. Much of the skull is formed from cartilage, and its overall structure is reduced.

== Oral jaws ==
=== Lower ===
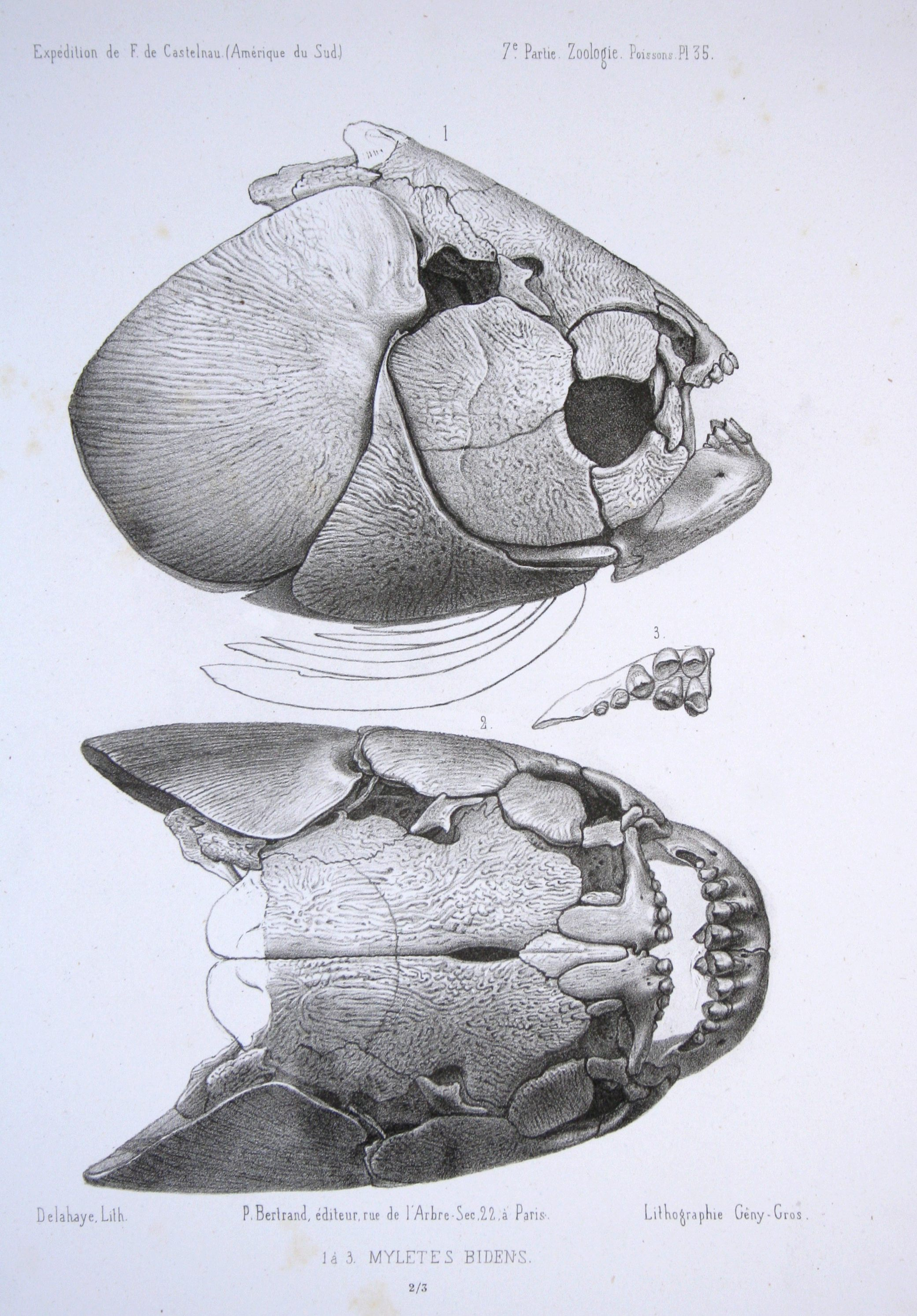
Oral jaw from side and above of Piaractus brachypomus, a close relative of piranhas

In vertebrates, the lower jaw (mandible or jawbone) is a bone forming the skull with the cranium. In lobe-finned fishes and the early fossil tetrapods, the bone homologous to the mandible of mammals is merely the largest of several bones in the lower jaw. It is referred to as the dentary bone, and forms the body of the outer surface of the jaw. It is bordered below by a number of splenial bones, while the angle of the jaw is formed by a lower angular bone and a suprangular bone just above it. The inner surface of the jaw is lined by a prearticular bone, while the articular bone forms the articulation with the skull proper. Finally a set of three narrow coronoid bones lie above the prearticular bone. As the name implies, the majority of the teeth are attached to the dentary, but there are commonly also teeth on the coronoid bones, and sometimes on the prearticular as well.

This complex primitive pattern has, however, been simplified to various degrees in the great majority of vertebrates, as bones have either fused or vanished entirely. In teleosts, only the dentary, articular, and angular bones remain. Cartilaginous fish, such as sharks, do not have any of the bones found in the lower jaw of other vertebrates. Instead, their lower jaw is composed of a cartilaginous structure homologous with the Meckel's cartilage of other groups. This also remains a significant element of the jaw in some primitive bony fish, such as sturgeons.

=== Upper ===
The upper jaw, or maxilla is a fusion of two bones along the palatal fissure that form the upper jaw. This is similar to the mandible (lower jaw), which is also a fusion of two halves at the mandibular symphysis. In bony fish, the maxilla is called the "upper maxilla," with the mandible being the "lower maxilla". The alveolar process of the maxilla holds the upper teeth, and is referred to as the maxillary arch. In most vertebrates, the foremost part of the upper jaw, to which the incisors are attached in mammals consists of a separate pair of bones, the premaxillae. In bony fish, both maxilla and premaxilla are relatively plate-like bones, forming only the sides of the upper jaw, and part of the face, with the premaxilla also forming the lower boundary of the nostrils. Cartilaginous fish, such as sharks and rays also lack a true maxilla. Their upper jaw is instead formed from a cartilagenous bar that is not homologous with the bone found in other vertebrates.

Some fish have permanently protruding upper jawbones called rostrums. Billfish (marlin, swordfish and sailfish) use rostrums (bills) to slash and stun prey. Paddlefish, goblin sharks and hammerhead sharks have rostrums packed with electroreceptors which signal the presence of prey by detecting weak electrical fields. Sawsharks and the critically endangered sawfish have rostrums (saws) which are both electro-sensitive and used for slashing. The rostrums extend ventrally in front of the fish. In the case of hammerheads the rostrum (hammer) extends both ventrally and laterally (sideways).

Fish with rostrums (extended upper jawbones)

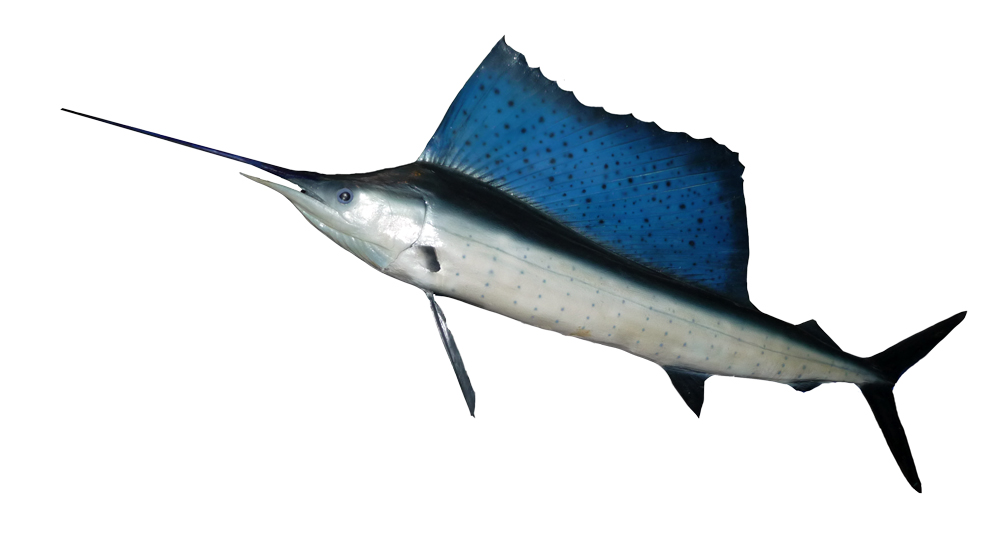
Sailfish, like all billfish, have a rostrum (bill) which evolved from the upper jawbone

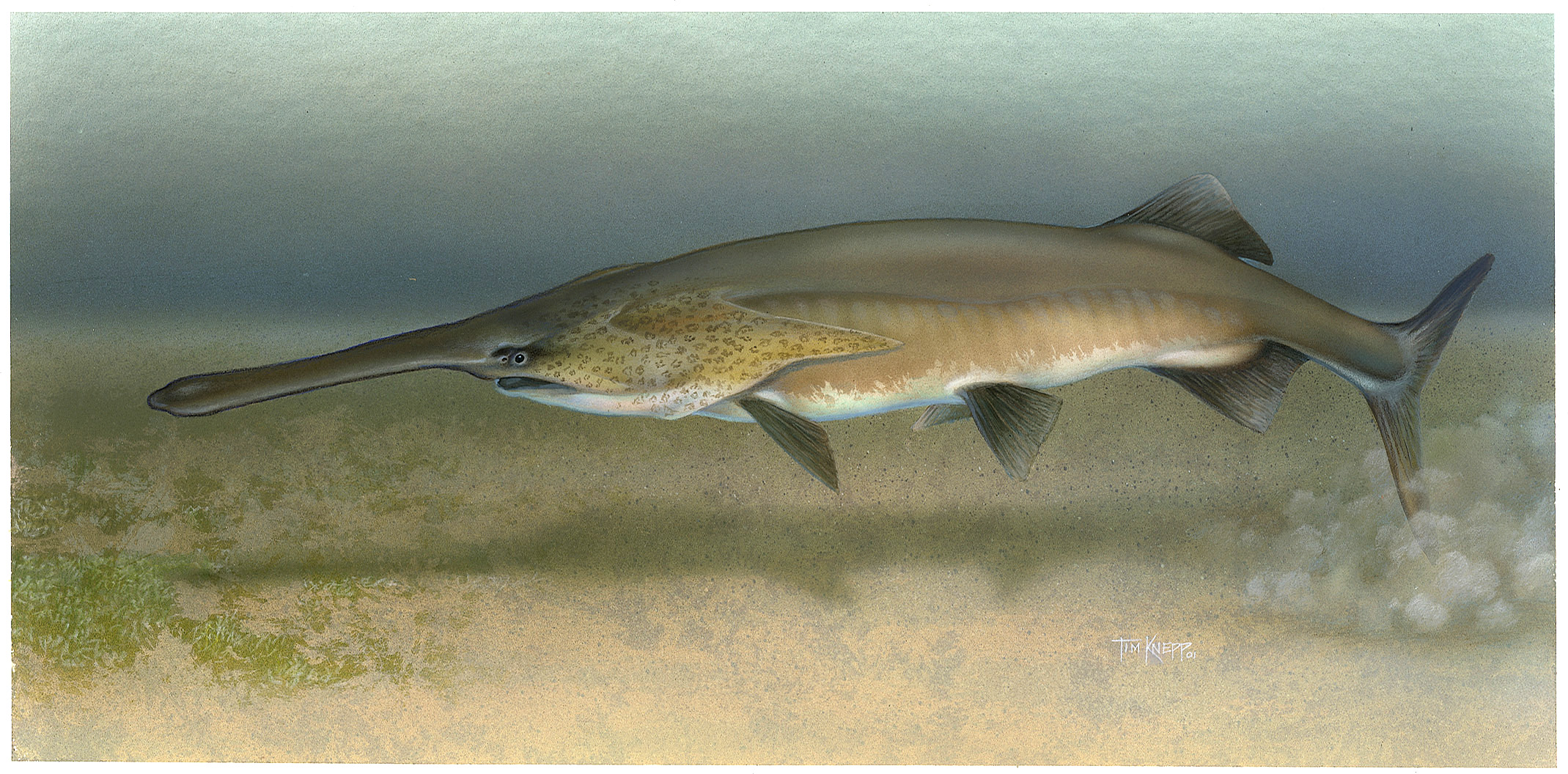
The paddlefish has a rostrum packed with electroreceptors

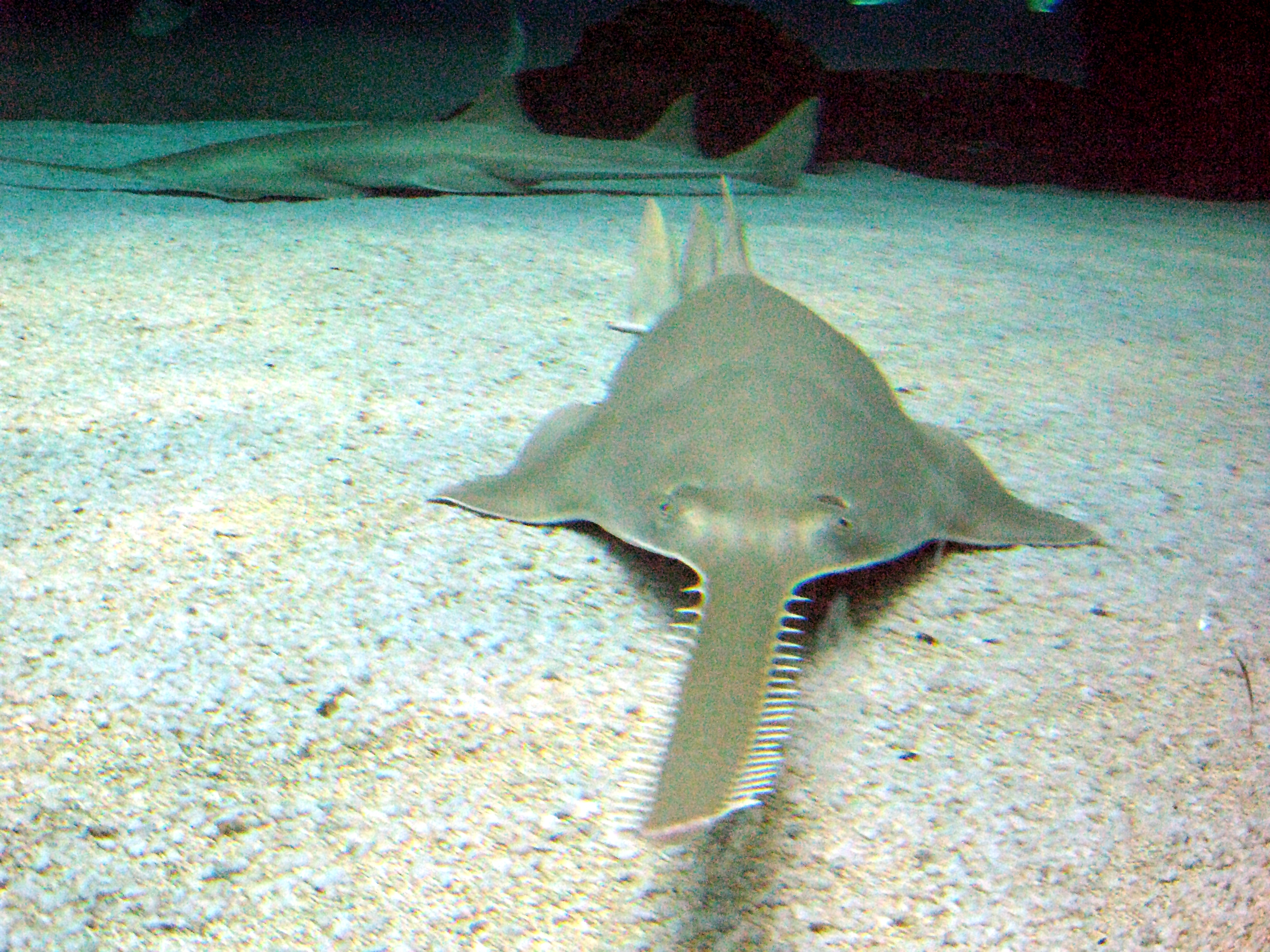
Sawfish have an electro-sensitive rostrum (saw) which is also used to slash at prey

=== Jaw protrusion ===
Teleosts have a movable premaxilla (a bone at the tip of the upper jaw) and corresponding modifications in the jaw musculature which make it possible for them to protrude their jaws outwards from the mouth. This is of great advantage, enabling them to grab prey and draw it into the mouth. In more derived teleosts, the enlarged premaxilla is the main tooth-bearing bone, and the maxilla, which is attached to the lower jaw, acts as a lever, pushing and pulling the premaxilla as the mouth is opened and closed. These protrusible jaws are evolutionary novelties in teleosts that evolved independently at least five times.

The premaxilla is unattached to the neurocranium (braincase); it plays a role in protruding the mouth and creating a circular opening. This lowers the pressure inside the mouth, sucking the prey inside. The lower jaw and maxilla (main upper fixed bone of the jaw) are then pulled back to close the mouth, and the fish is able to grasp the prey. By contrast, mere closure of the jaws would risk pushing food out of the mouth. In more advanced teleosts, the premaxilla is enlarged and has teeth, while the maxilla is toothless. The maxilla functions to push both the premaxilla and the lower jaw forward. To open the mouth, an adductor muscle pulls back the top of the maxilla, pushing the lower jaw forward. In addition, the maxilla rotates slightly, which pushes forward a bony process that interlocks with the premaxilla.

Teleosts achieve this jaw protrusion using one of four different mechanisms involving the ligamentous linkages within the skull.

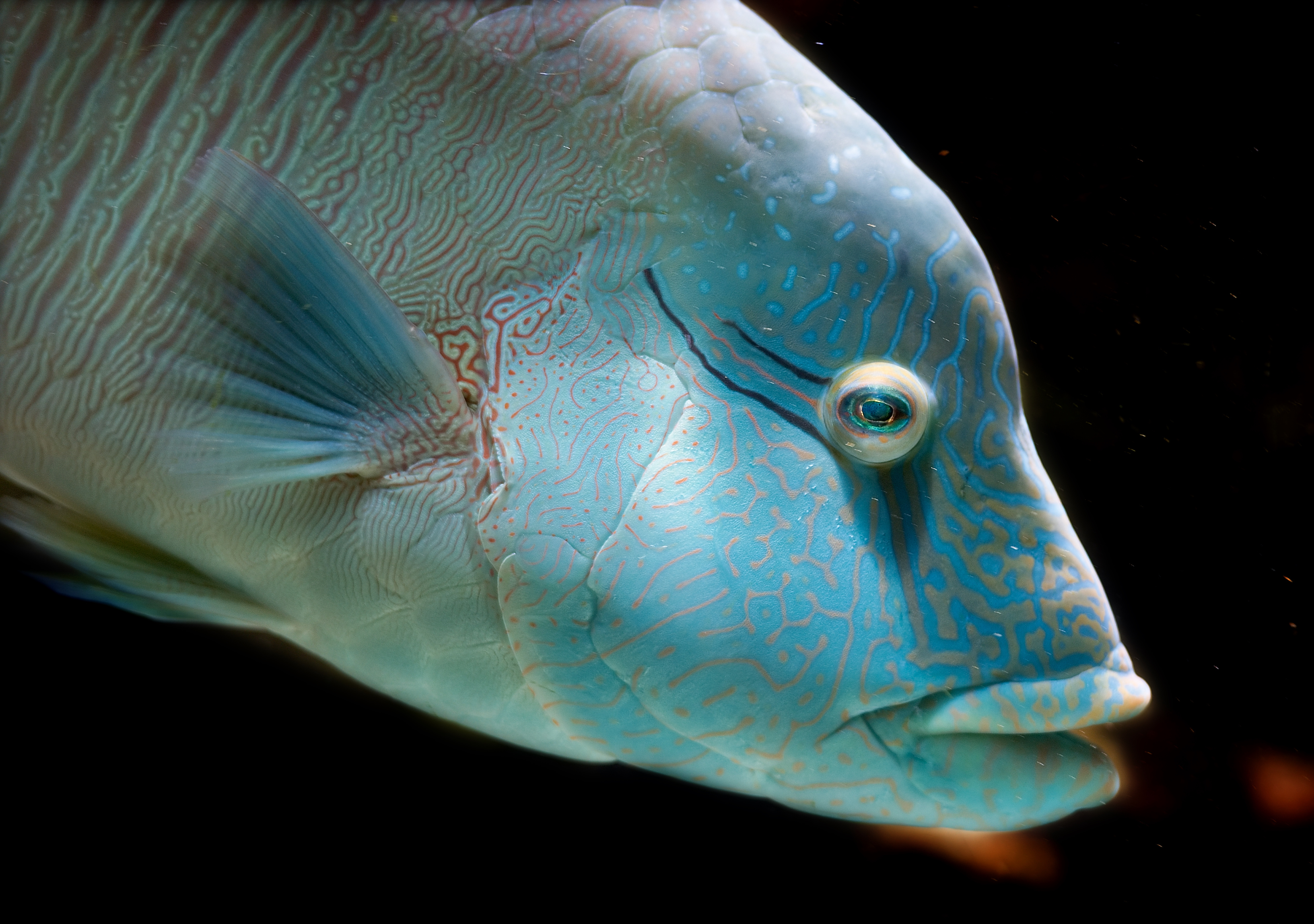
Lips of a humphead wrasse

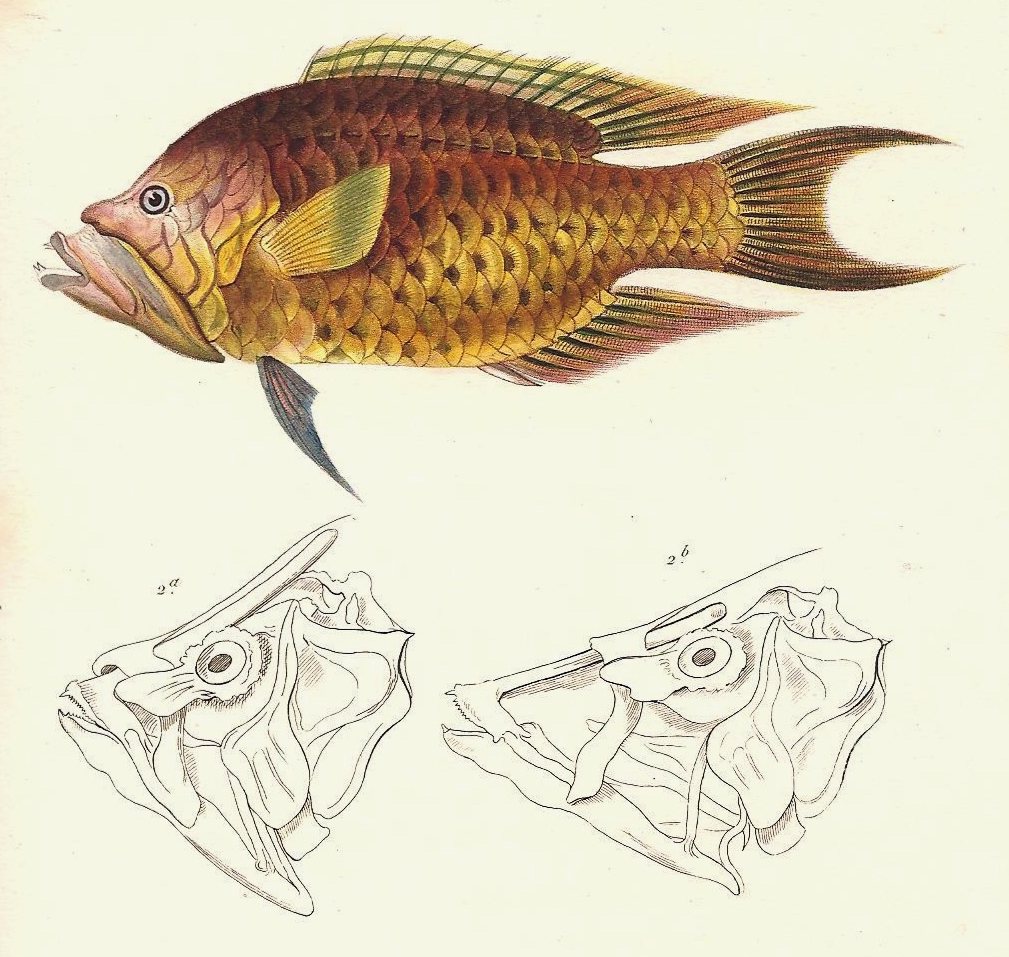
The sling-jaw wrasse has the most extreme jaw protrusion of all fishes.

Slingjaw wrasse protruding its jaw – YouTube

- Mandibular depression mechanism: The depression of the lower jaw (mandible) pulls or pushes the premaxilla into protrusion via force transmission through ligaments and tendons connected to the upper jaws (e.g. Cyprinus, Labrus). This is the most commonly used mechanism.
- Twisting maxilla mechanism: The depression of the mandible causes the maxilla to twist about the longitudinal axis resulting in the protrusion of the premaxilla (e.g. Mugil).
- Decoupled mechanism: Protrusion of the premaxilla is accomplished through elevation of the neurocranium causing the premaxilla to move anteriorly. Movements of the neurocranium are not coupled with the kinematics of the upper jaw (e.g. Spathodus erythrodon), allowing for more versatility and modularity of the jaws during prey capture and manipulation.
- Suspensorial abduction mechanism: The lateral expansion of the suspensorium (a combination of the palatine, pterygoid series, and quadrate bones) pulls on a ligament which causes the premaxilla to protrude anteriorly (e.g. Petrotilapia tridentiger).

Some teleosts use more than one of these mechanisms (e.g. Petrotilapia).

Wrasses have become a primary study species in fish-feeding biomechanics due to their jaw structure. They have protractile mouths, usually with separate jaw teeth that jut outwards. Many species can be readily recognized by their thick lips, the inside of which is sometimes curiously folded, a peculiarity which gave rise to the German name of "lip-fishes" (Lippfische).

The nasal and mandibular bones are connected at their posterior ends to the rigid neurocranium, and the superior and inferior articulations of the maxilla are joined to the anterior tips of these two bones, respectively, creating a loop of 4 rigid bones connected by moving joints. This "four-bar linkage" has the property of allowing numerous arrangements to achieve a given mechanical result (fast jaw protrusion or a forceful bite), thus decoupling morphology from function. The actual morphology of wrasses reflects this, with many lineages displaying different jaw morphology that results in the same functional output in a similar or identical ecological niche.

The most extreme jaw protrusion found in fishes occurs in the slingjaw wrasse, Epibulus insidiator . This fish can extend its jaws up to 65% the length of its head. This species utilizes its quick and extreme jaw protrusion to capture smaller fishes and crustaceans. The genus this species belongs to possess one unique ligament (vomero-interopercular) and two enlarged ligaments (interoperculo-mandibular and premaxilla-maxilla), which along with a few changes to the form of cranial bones, allow it to achieve extreme jaw protrusion.

== Pharyngeal jaws ==
Moray eels have two sets of jaws: the oral jaws that capture prey and the pharyngeal jaws that advance into the mouth and move prey from the oral jaws to the esophagus for swallowing

Pharyngeal jaws are a second set of jaws distinct from the primary (oral) jaws. They are contained within the throat, or pharynx, of most bony fish. They are believed to have originated, in a similar way to oral jaws, as a modification of the fifth gill arch which no longer has a respiratory function. The first four arches still function as gills. Unlike the oral jaw, the pharyngeal jaw has no jaw joint, but is supported instead by a sling of muscles.

Pharyngeal jaw of an asp carrying some pharyngeal teeth

A notable example occurs with the moray eel. The pharyngeal jaws of most fishes are not mobile. The pharyngeal jaws of the moray are highly mobile, perhaps as an adaptation to the constricted nature of the burrows they inhabit which inhibits their ability to swallow as other fishes do by creating a negative pressure in the mouth. Instead, when the moray bites prey, it first bites normally with its oral jaws, capturing the prey. Immediately thereafter, the pharyngeal jaws are brought forward and bite down on the prey to grip it; they then retract, pulling the prey down the moray eel's gullet, allowing it to be swallowed.

All vertebrates have a pharynx, used in both feeding and respiration. The pharynx arises during development through a series of six or more outpocketings called pharyngeal arches on the lateral sides of the head. The pharyngeal arches give rise to a number of different structures in the skeletal, muscular and circulatory systems in a manner which varies across the vertebrates. Pharyngeal arches trace back through chordates to basal deuterostomes who also share endodermal outpocketings of the pharyngeal apparatus. Similar patterns of gene expression can be detected in the developing pharynx of amphioxus and hemichordates. However, the vertebrate pharynx is unique in that it gives rise to endoskeletal support through the contribution of neural crest cells.

== Cartilaginous jaws ==
Cartilaginous fishes (sharks, rays and skates) have cartilaginous jaws. The jaw's surface (in comparison to the vertebrae and gill arches) needs extra strength due to its heavy exposure to physical stress. It has a layer of tiny hexagonal plates called "tesserae", which are crystal blocks of calcium salts arranged as a mosaic. This gives these areas much of the same strength found in the bony tissue found in other animals.

Generally sharks have only one layer of tesserae, but the jaws of large specimens, such as the bull shark, tiger shark, and the great white shark, have two to three layers or more, depending on body size. The jaws of a large great white shark may have up to five layers. In the rostrum (snout), the cartilage can be spongy and flexible to absorb the power of impacts.

In sharks and other extant elasmobranchs the upper jaw is not fused to the cranium, and the lower jaw is articulated with the upper. The arrangement of soft tissue and any additional articulations connecting these elements is collectively known as the jaw suspension. There are several archetypal jaw suspensions: amphistyly, orbitostyly, hyostyly, and euhyostyly. In amphistyly, the palatoquadrate has a postorbital articulation with the chondrocranium from which ligaments primarily suspend it anteriorly. The hyoid articulates with the mandibular arch posteriorly, but it appears to provide little support to the upper and lower jaws. In orbitostyly, the orbital process hinges with the orbital wall and the hyoid provides the majority of suspensory support. In contrast, hyostyly involves an ethmoid articulation between the upper jaw and the cranium, while the hyoid most likely provides vastly more jaw support compared to the anterior ligaments. Finally, in euhyostyly, also known as true hyostyly, the mandibular cartilages lack a ligamentous connection to the cranium. Instead, the hyomandibular cartilages provide the only means of jaw support, while the ceratohyal and basihyal elements articulate with the lower jaw, but are disconnected from the rest of the hyoid.

== Teeth ==
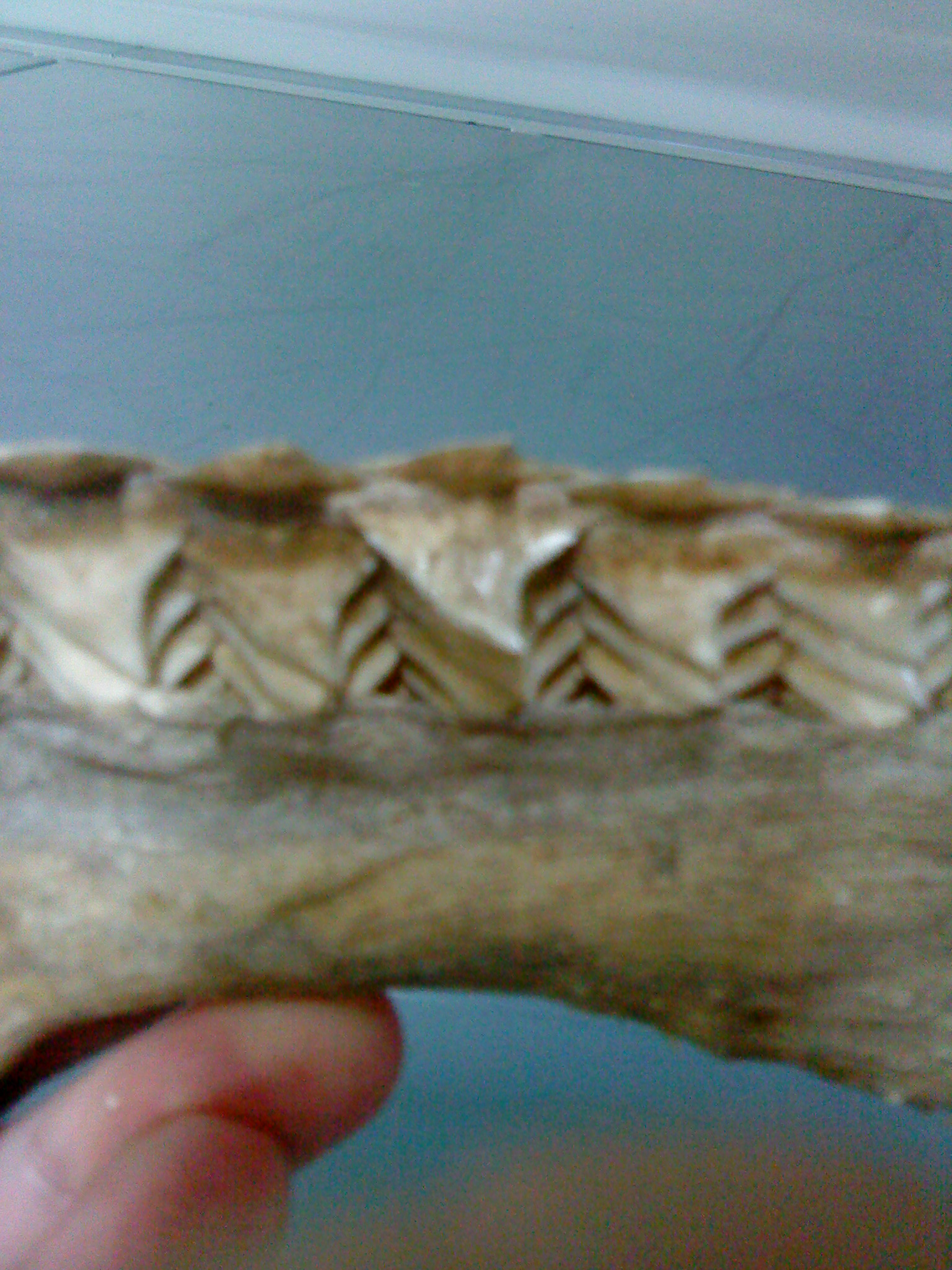
Inside of a shark jaw where new teeth move forward as though on a conveyor belt

Jaws provide a platform in most bony fish for simple pointed teeth, however, there are many exceptions. Some fish like carp and zebrafish have pharyngeal teeth only. Sea horses, pipefish, and adult sturgeon have no teeth of any type. In fish, Hox gene expression regulates mechanisms for tooth initiation.

While both sharks and bony fish continuously produce new teeth throughout their lives, they do so via different mechanism. Shark teeth are embedded in the gums rather than directly affixed to the jaw as in some fish. Shark teeth form within the jaw move outward in rows until they are eventually dislodged in a manner similar to a conveyor belt. Their scales, called dermal denticles, and teeth are homologous organs. Some sharks lose 30,000 or more teeth in their lifetime. The rate of tooth replacement varies from once every 8 to 10 days to several months, although few studies have been able to quantify this. In most species of bony fish, teeth are replaced one at a time as opposed to the simultaneous replacement of an entire row. However, in piranhas and pacus, all the teeth on one side of the jaw are replaced at a time.

Tooth shape depends on the shark's diet: those that feed on mollusks and crustaceans have dense and flattened teeth used for crushing, those that feed on fish have needle-like teeth for gripping, and those that feed on larger prey such as mammals have pointed lower teeth for gripping and triangular upper teeth with serrated edges for cutting. The teeth of plankton-feeders such as the basking shark and whale sharks are very small.

Cartilaginous jaws and their teeth

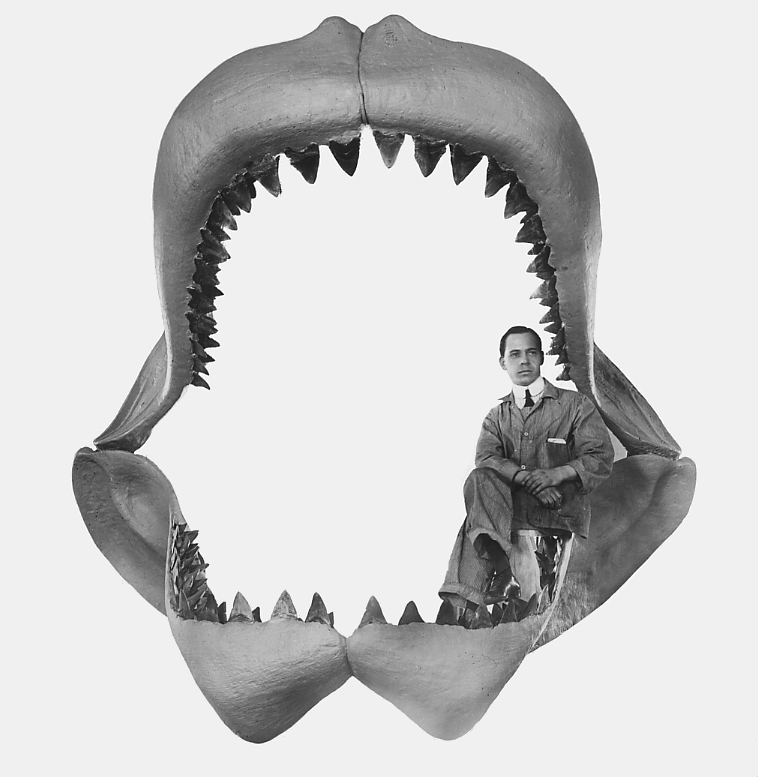
Jaw reconstruction of the extinct Carcharodon megalodon, 1909

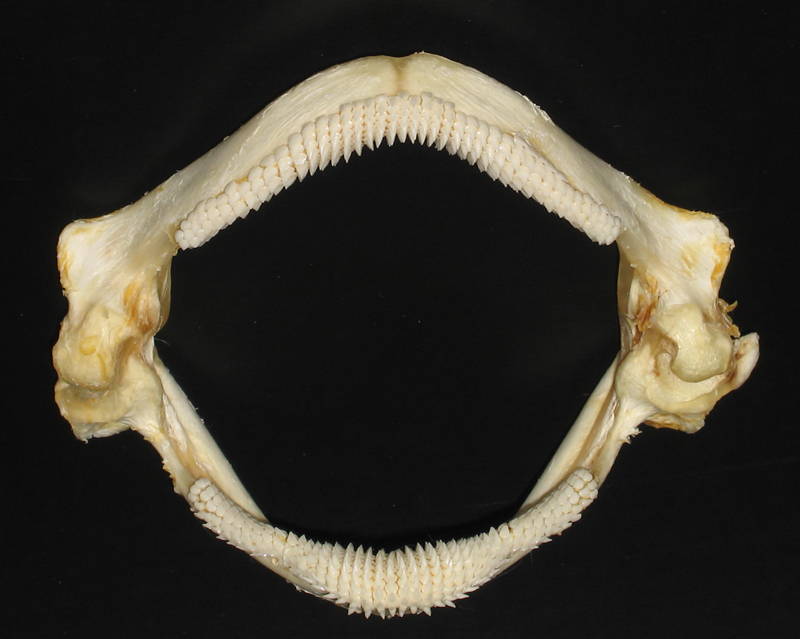
The thornback ray has teeth adapted to feed on crabs, shrimps and small fish.

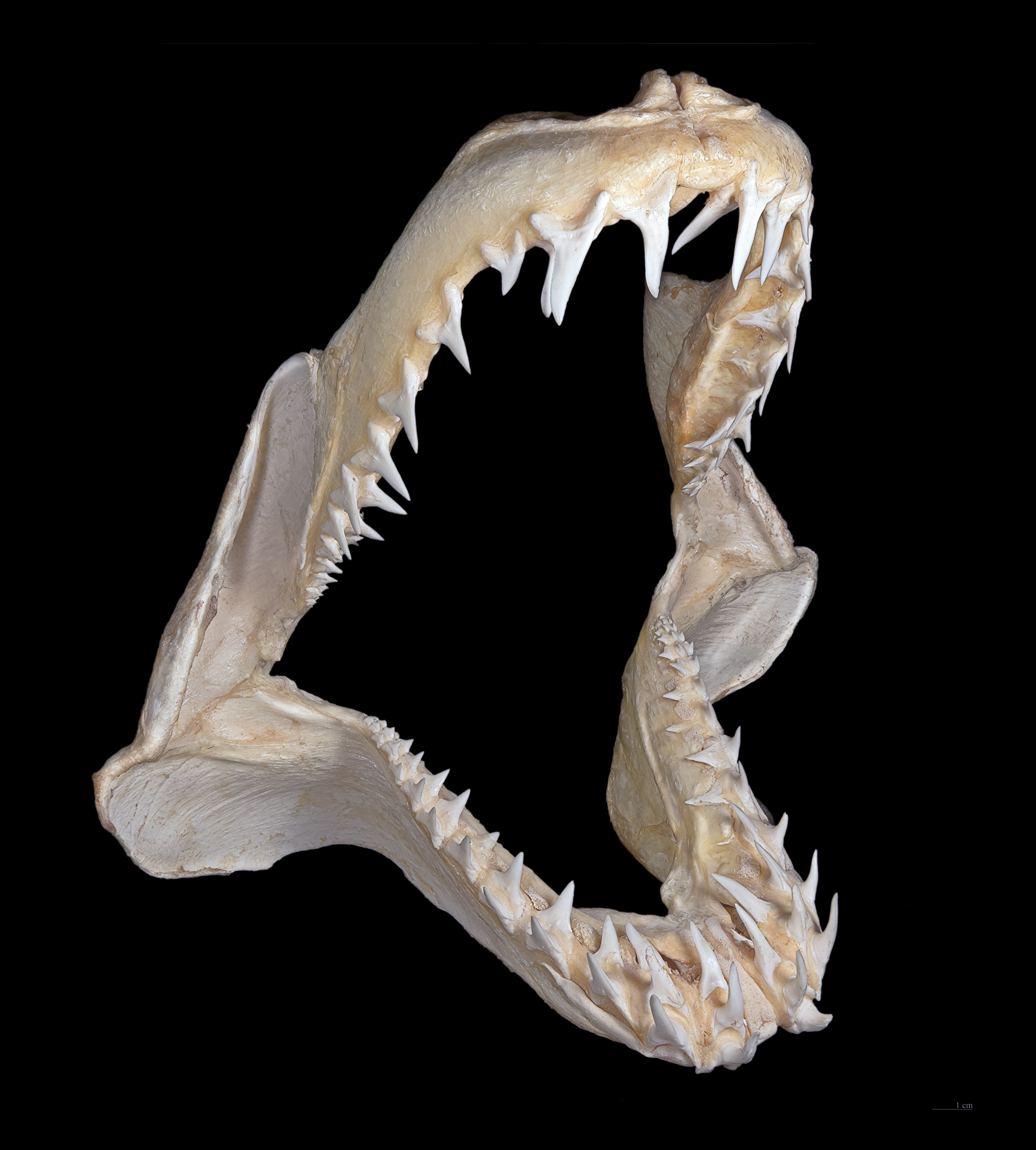
The shortfin mako shark lunges vertically and tears flesh from prey

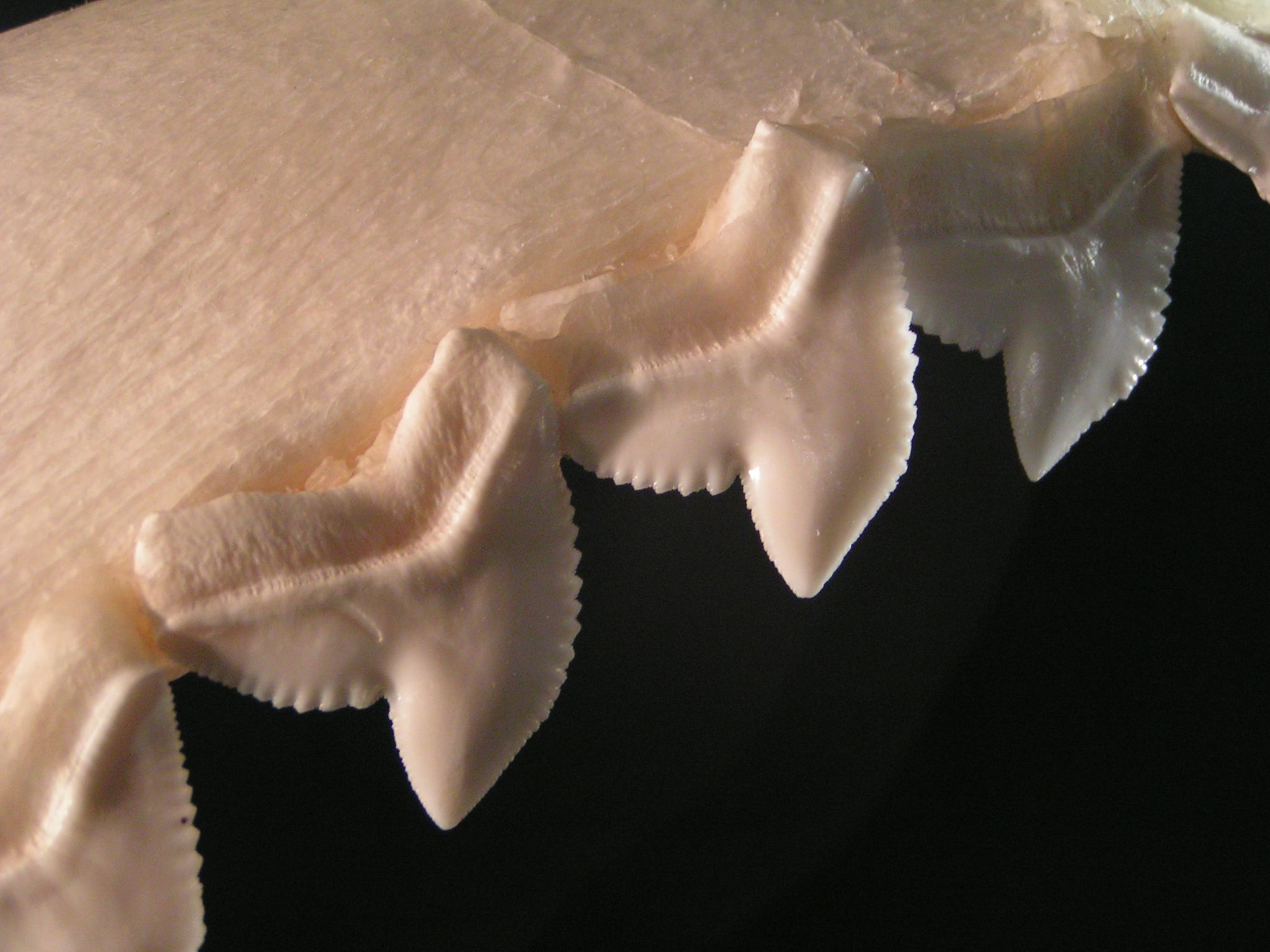
Tiger shark teeth are oblique and serrated to saw through flesh

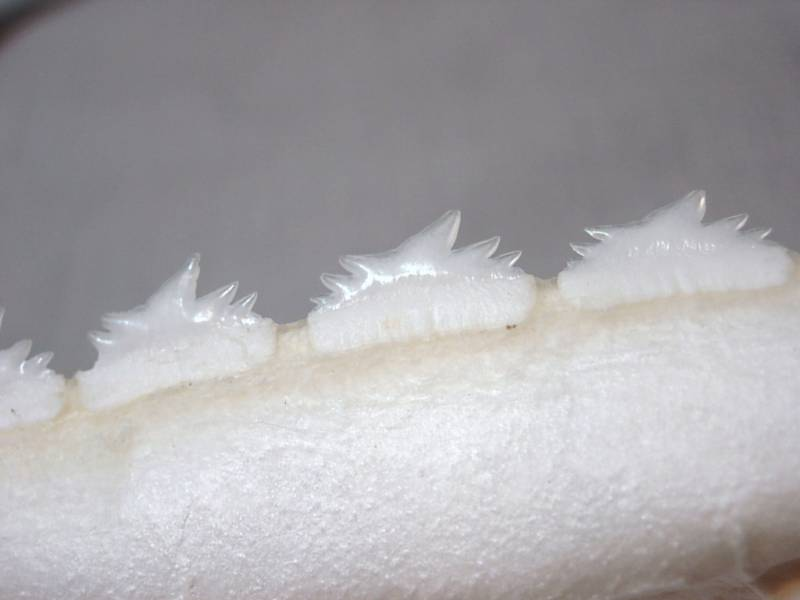
The prickly shark has knife-like teeth with main cusps flanked by lateral cusplets

== Examples ==
=== Salmon ===
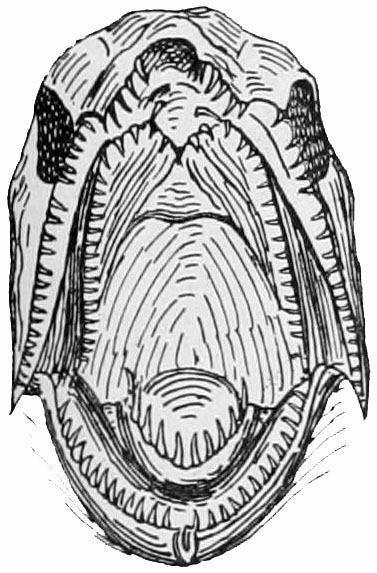
Open mouth of a salmon showing the second set of pharyngeal jaws positioned at the back of the throat

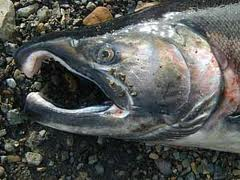
Kype of a spawning male salmon

Male salmon often remodel their jaws during spawning runs so they have a pronounced curvature. These hooked jaws are called kypes. The purpose of the kype is not altogether clear, though they can be used to establish dominance by clamping them around the base of the tail (caudal peduncle) of an opponent.

=== Cichlids ===
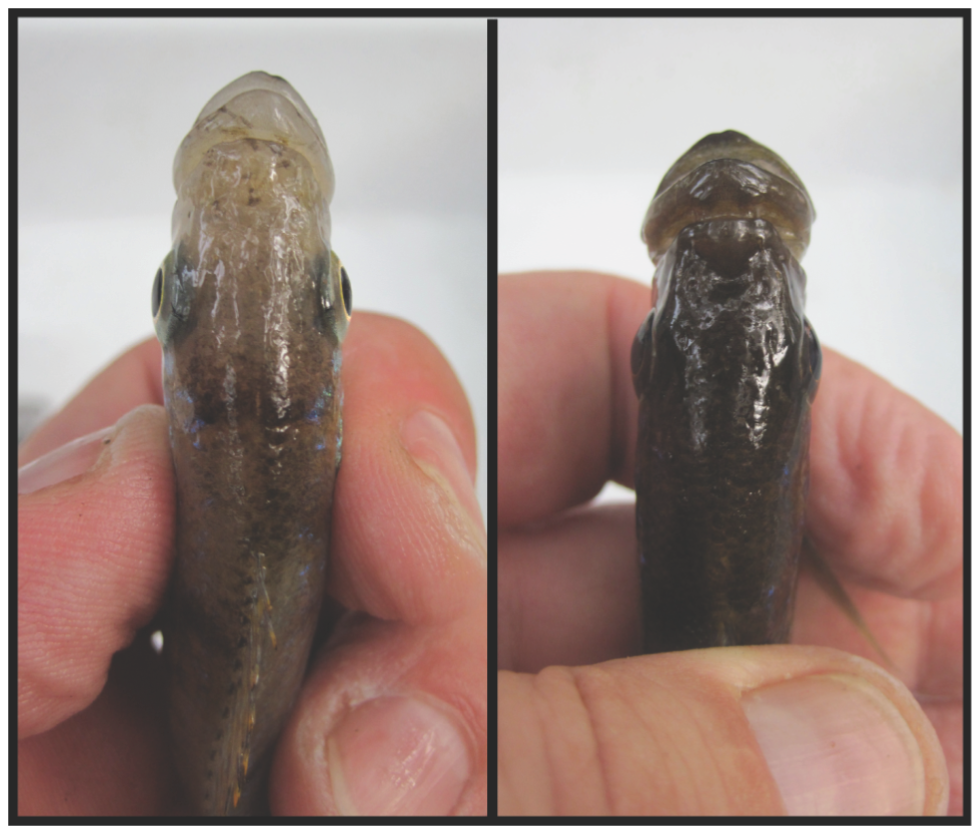
Dorsal view of right-bending (left) and left-bending (right) jaw morphs

Fish jaws, like vertebrates in general, normally show bilateral symmetry. An exception occurs with the parasitic scale-eating cichlid Perissodus microlepis. The jaws of this fish occur in two distinct morphological forms. One morph has its jaw twisted to the left, allowing it to eat scales more readily on its victim's right flank. The other morph has its jaw twisted to the right, which makes it easier to eat scales on its victim's left flank. The relative abundance of the two morphs in populations is regulated by frequency-dependent selection.

In cichlids generally, the oral and pharyngeal teeth differ with different species in ways that allow them to process different kinds of prey. Primary oral jaws contain teeth which are used to capture and hold food, while pharyngeal jaws have pharyngeal teeth which function as a chewing tool.

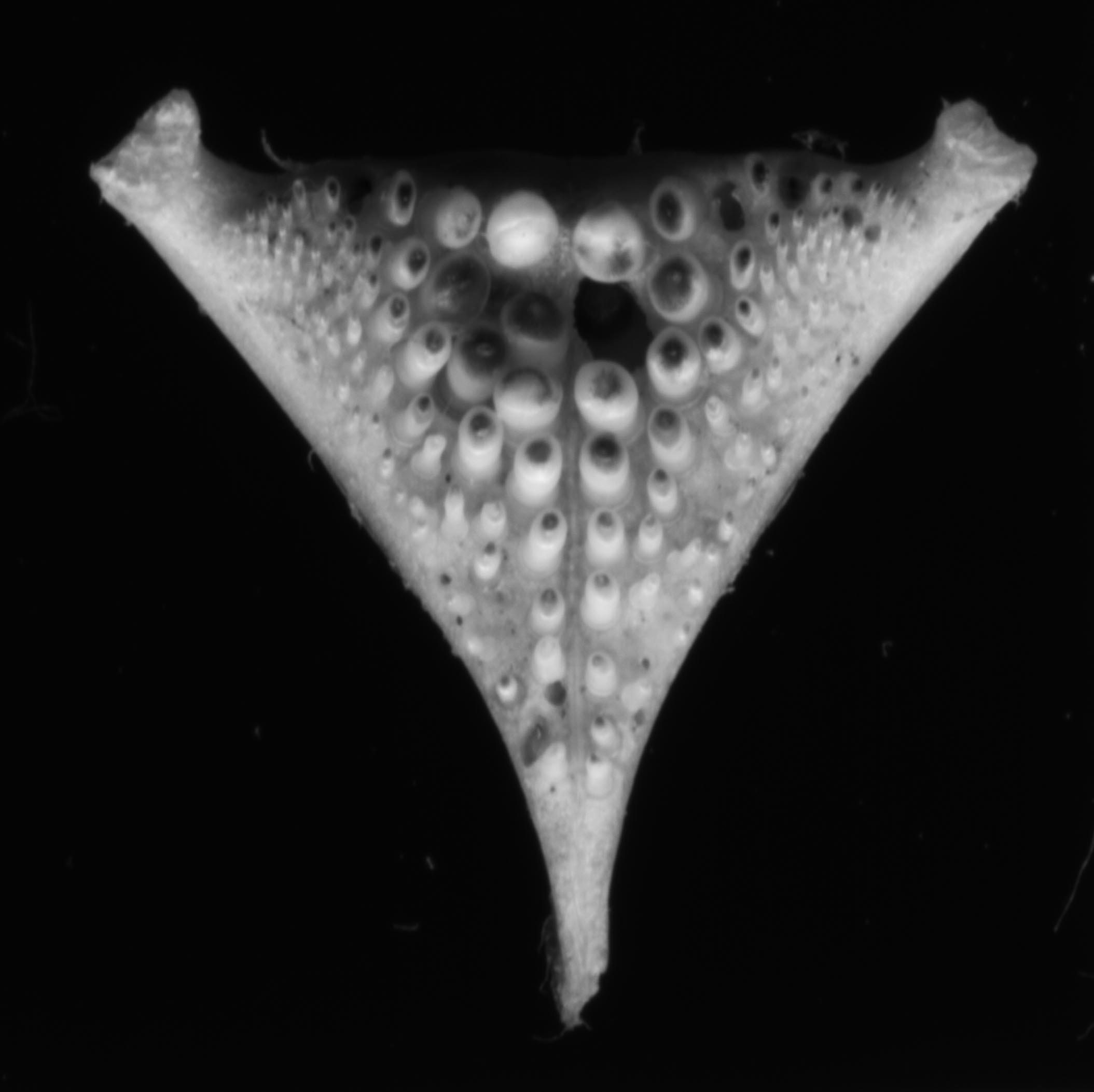
Lower jawbone with molariform teeth (Ctenochromis horei)

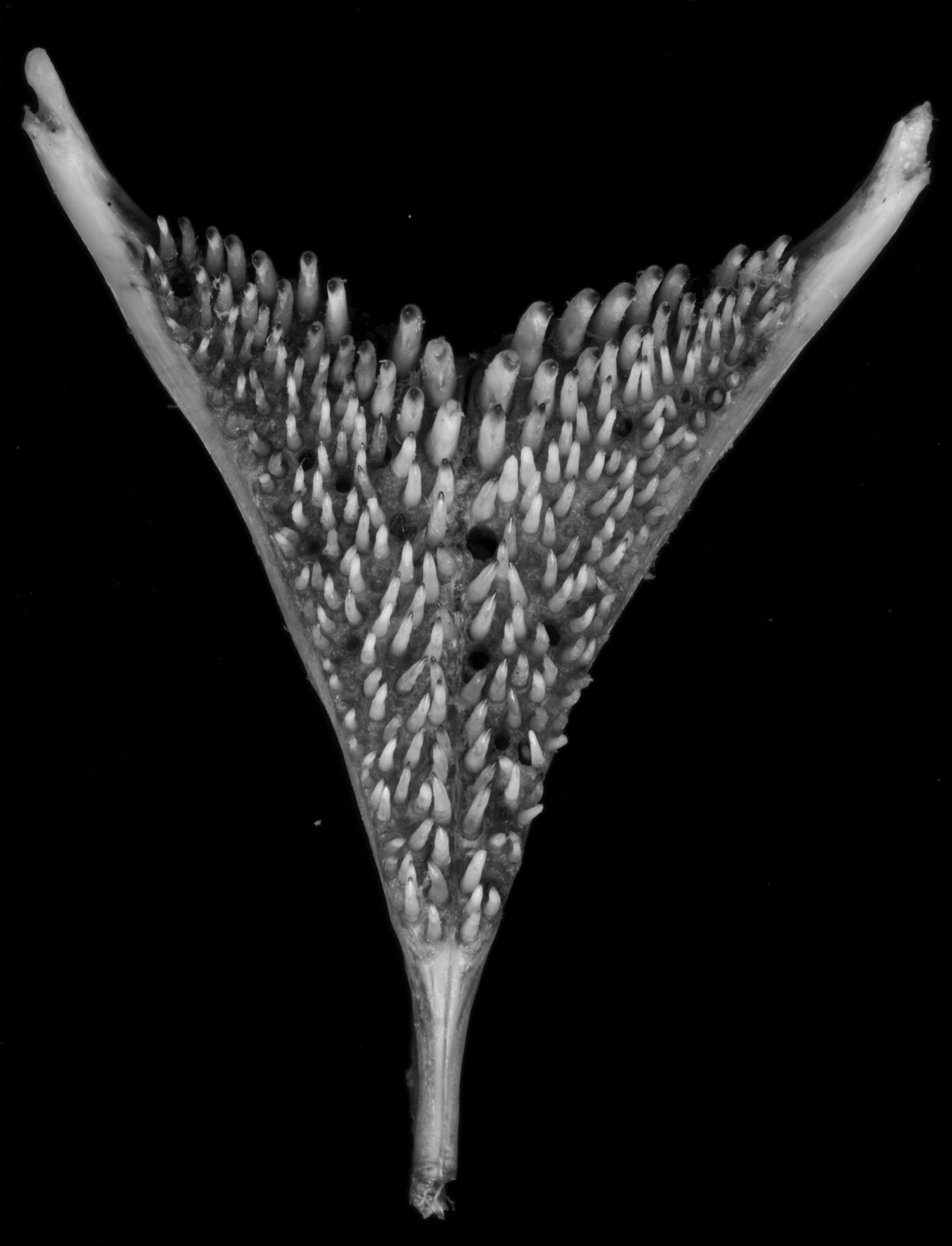
Lower jawbone with conical teeth (giant cichlid)

This allows for different nutritional strategies, and because of this, cichlids are able to colonize different habitats. The structural diversity of the lower pharyngeal jaw could be one of the reasons for the occurrence of so many cichlid species. Convergent evolution took place over the course of the cichlid radiation, synchronous with different trophic niches. The pharyngeal jaw apparatus consists of two upper and one single lower plate, all of which have dentations that differ in size and type. The structure of the lower pharynx is often associated with the species of food of the species.

In order to crack shellfish considerable force must be generated, which is why cichlids that feed on molluscs (e.g. the cichlid bass, Crenicichla minuano), have molariform teeth and a strengthened jawbone bone. To grab and bite prey not armoured with shells, predators need conical, bent back teeth. Herbivorous cichlids also have structural differences in their teeth. Cichlids that specialise in algae (e.g. Pseudotropheus) tend to have small conical teeth. Species that feed on pods or seeds require large conical teeth for chewing their food.

=== Other ===
Stoplight loosejaw

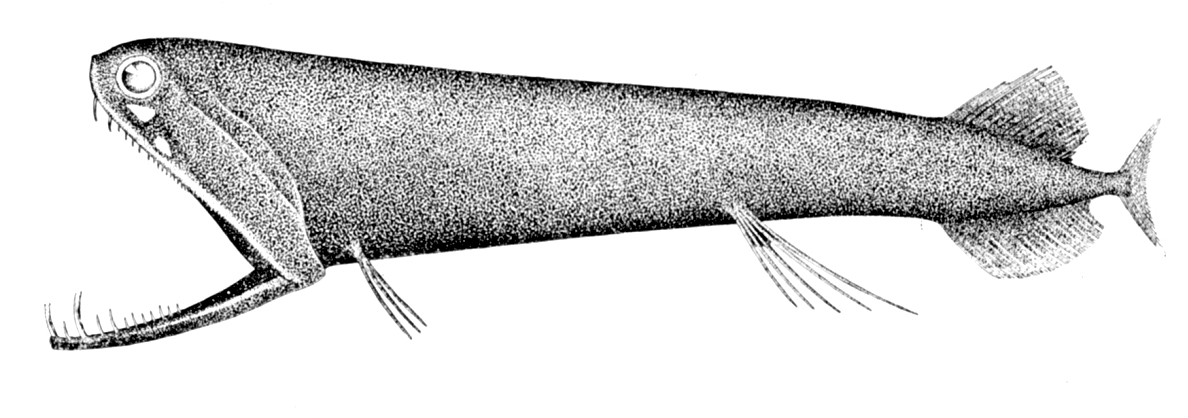
Relative to its size the stoplight loosejaw has one of the widest gapes of any fish

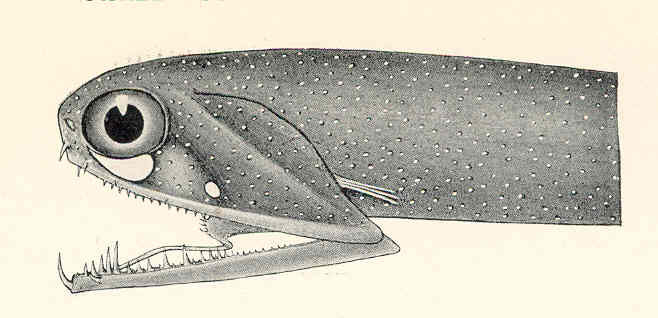
Closeup of jaw

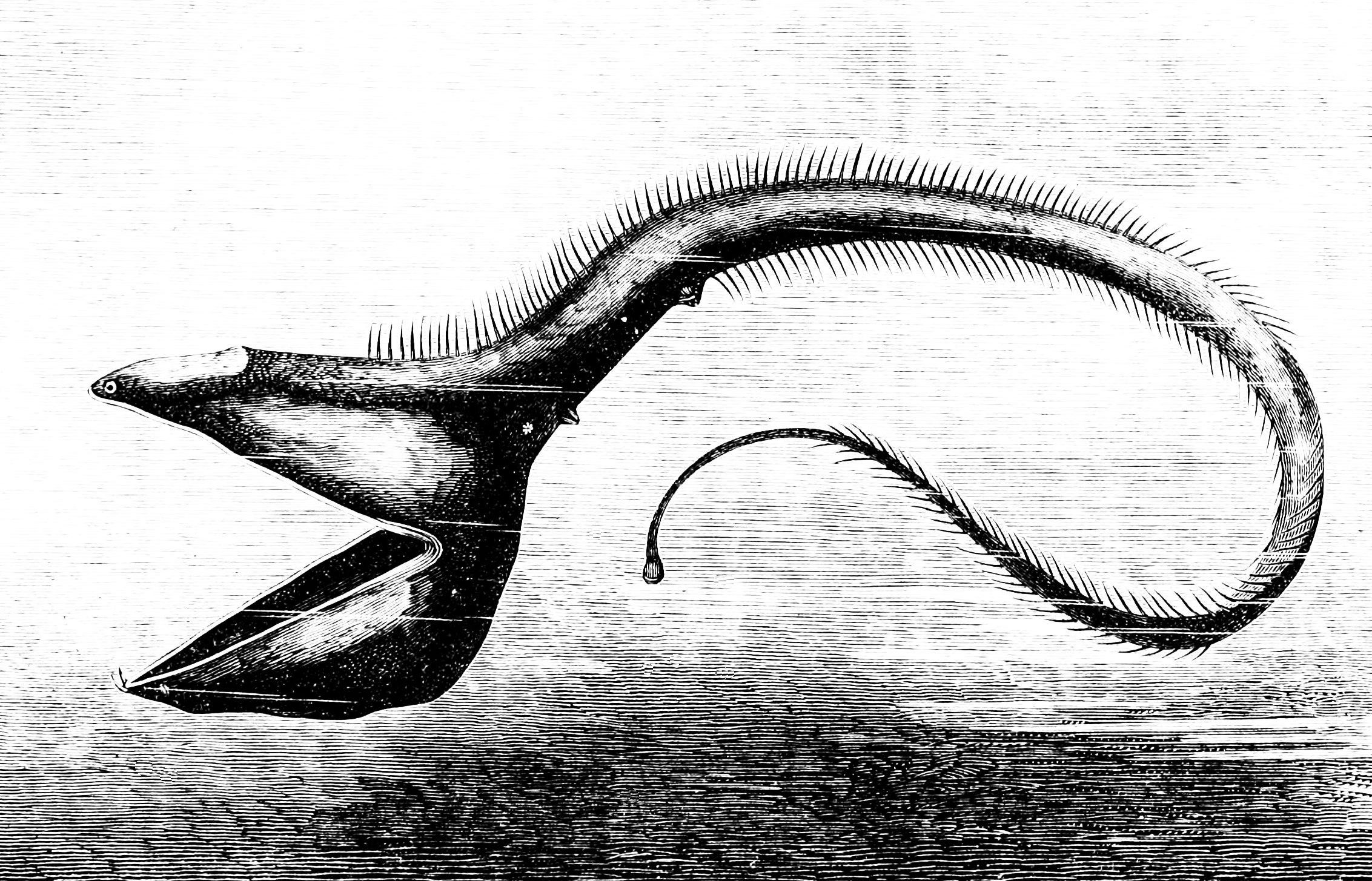
The pelican eel jaws are larger than its body.

Stoplight loosejaws are small fish found worldwide in the deep sea. Relative to their size they have one of the widest gapes of any fish. The lower jaw has no ethmoid membrane (floor) and is attached only by the hinge and a modified tongue bone. There are several large, fang-like teeth in the front of the jaws, followed by many small barbed teeth. There are several groups of pharyngeal teeth that serve to direct food down the esophagus.

Another deep sea fish, the pelican eel, has jaws larger than its body. The jaws are lined with small teeth and are loosely hinged. They open wide enough to swallow a fish larger than the eel itself.

Distichodontidae are a family of fresh water fishes which can be divided into genera with protractile upper jaws which are carnivores, and genera with nonprotractile upper jaws which are herbivores or predators of very small organisms.

== Evolution ==
Vertebrate classes

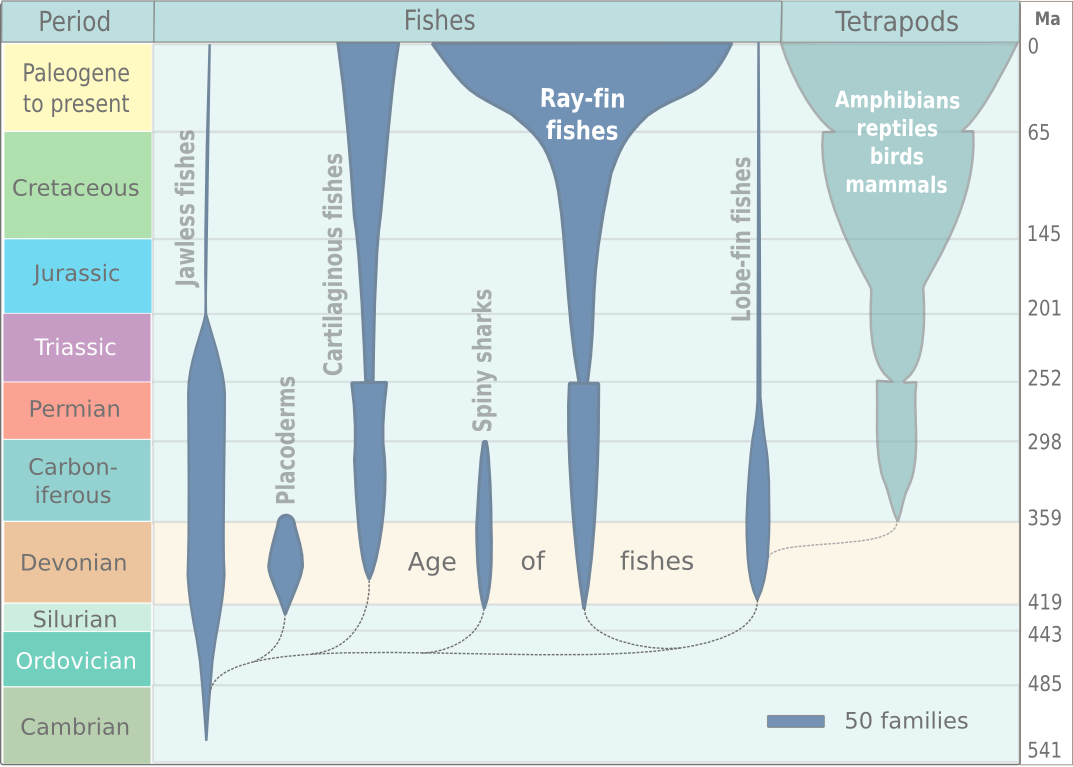
Spindle diagram for the evolution of fish and other vertebrate classes. The earliest classes that developed jaws were the now extinct placoderms and the spiny sharks.

The appearance of the early vertebrate jaw has been described as "a crucial innovation" and "perhaps the most profound and radical evolutionary step in the vertebrate history". Fish without jaws had more difficulty surviving than fish with jaws, and most jawless fish became extinct during the Triassic period. However studies of the cyclostomes, the jawless hagfishes and lampreys that did survive, have yielded little insight into the deep remodelling of the vertebrate skull that must have taken place as early jaws evolved.

The customary view is that jaws are homologous to the gill arches. In jawless fishes a series of gills opened behind the mouth, and these gills became supported by cartilaginous elements. The first set of these elements surrounded the mouth to form the jaw. The upper portion of the second embryonic arch supporting the gill became the hyomandibular bone of jawed fishes, which supports the skull and therefore links the jaw to the cranium. The hyomandibula is a set of bones found in the hyoid region in most fishes. It usually plays a role in suspending the jaws or the operculum in the case of teleosts.

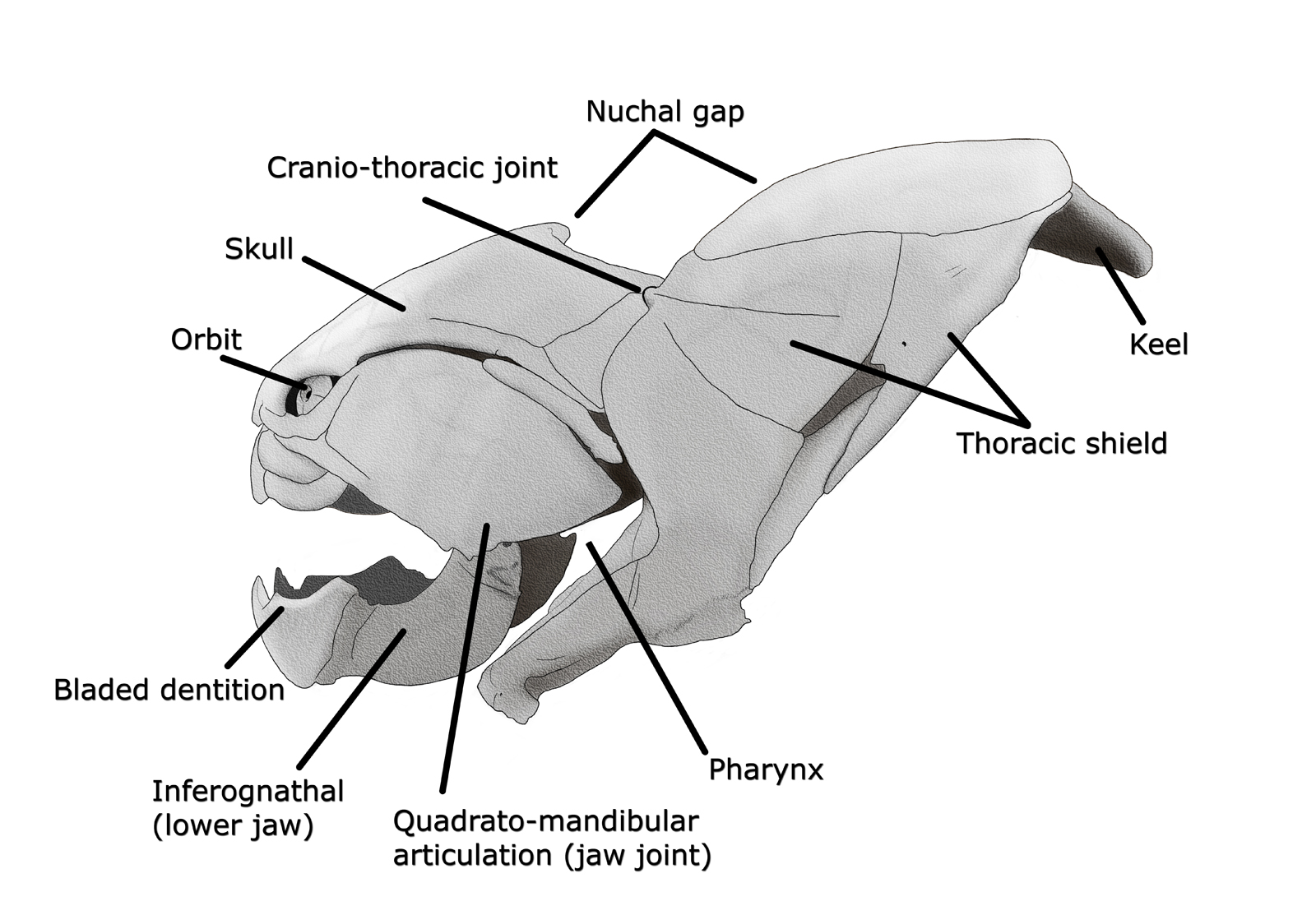
↑ Skull diagram of the huge predatory placoderm fish Dunkleosteus terrelli, which lived about 380–360 million years ago

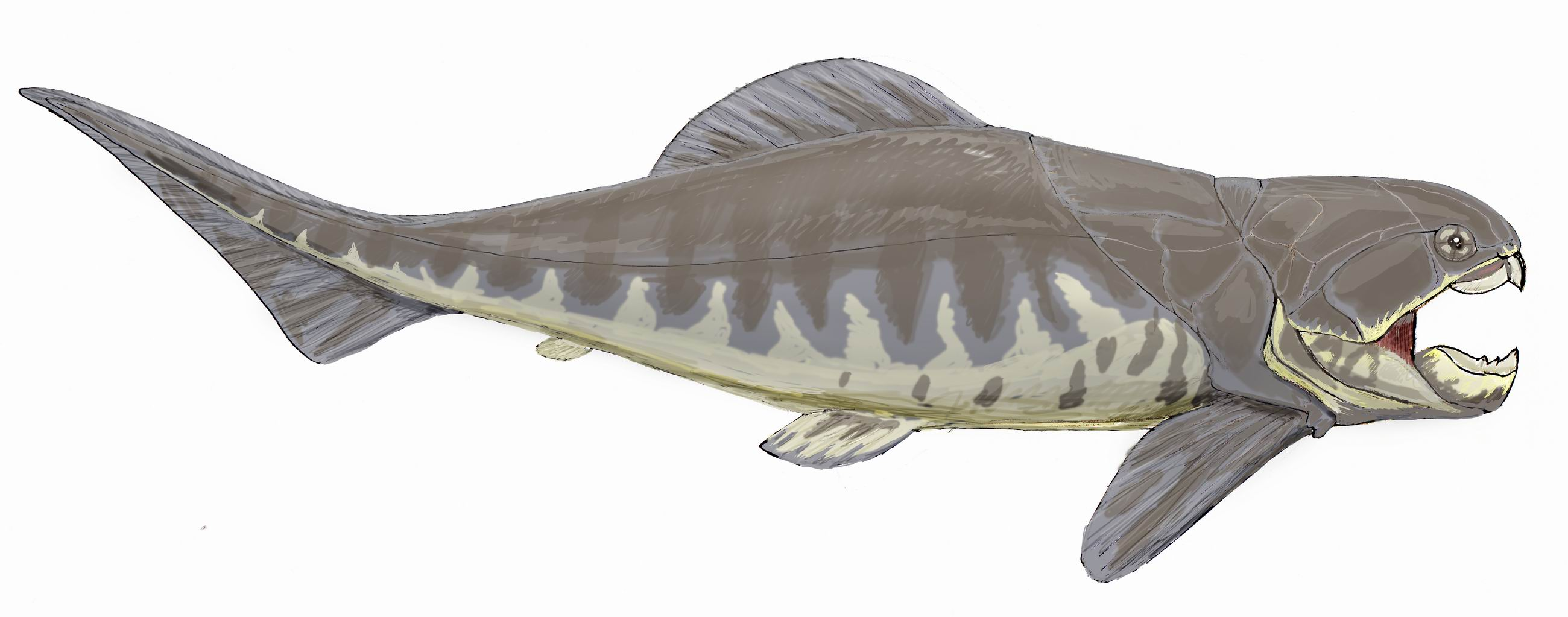
↑ Reconstruction of Dunkleosteus terrelli

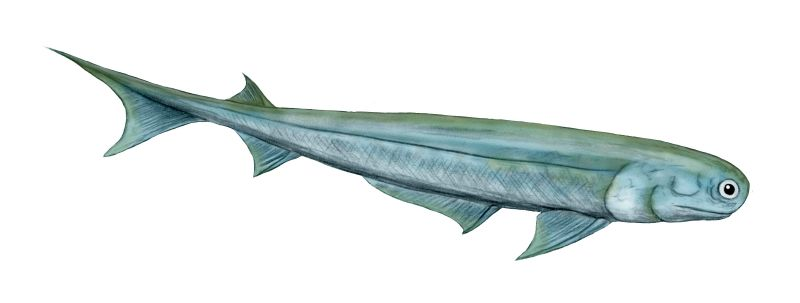
↑ Spiny shark

It is now accepted that the precursors of the jawed vertebrates are the long extinct bony (armoured) jawless fish, the so-called ostracoderms. The earliest known fish with jaws are the now extinct placoderms and spiny sharks.

Placoderms were a class of fish, heavily armoured at the front of their body, which first appeared in the fossil records during the Silurian about 430 million years ago. Initially they were very successful, diversifying remarkably during the Devonian. They became extinct by the end of that period, about 360 million years ago. Their largest species, Dunkleosteus terrelli, measured up to 10 m (33 ft) and weighed 3.6 t (4.0 short tons). It possessed a four bar linkage mechanism for jaw opening that incorporated connections between the skull, the thoracic shield, the lower jaw and the jaw muscles joined together by movable joints. This mechanism allowed Dunkleosteus terrelli to achieve a high speed of jaw opening, opening their jaws in 20 milliseconds and completing the whole process in 50-60 milliseconds, comparable to modern fishes that use suction feeding to assist in prey capture. They could also produce high bite forces when closing the jaw, estimated at 6,000 N (1,350 lb_{f}) at the tip and 7,400 N (1,660 lb_{f}) at the blade edge in the largest individuals. The pressures generated in those regions were high enough to puncture or cut through cuticle or dermal armour suggesting that Dunkleosteus terrelli was perfectly adapted to prey on free-swimming, armoured prey like arthropods, ammonites, and other placoderms.

Spiny sharks were another class of fish which appeared also in the fossil records during the Silurian at about the same time as the placoderms. They were smaller than most placoderms, usually under 20 centimetres. Spiny sharks did not diversify as much as placoderms, but survived much longer into the Early Permian about 290 million years ago.

The original selective advantage offered by the jaw may not be related to feeding, but rather to increased respiration efficiency. The jaws were used in the buccal pump still observable in modern fish and amphibians, that uses "breathing with the cheeks" to pump water across the gills of fish or air into the lungs in the case of amphibians. Over evolutionary time the more familiar use of jaws (to humans), in feeding, was selected for and became a very important function in vertebrates. Many teleost fish have substantially modified jaws for suction feeding and jaw protrusion, resulting in highly complex jaws with dozens of bones involved.

Jaws are thought to derive from the pharyngeal arches that support the gills in fish. The two most anterior of these arches are thought to have become the jaw itself (see hyomandibula) and the hyoid arch, which braces the jaw against the braincase and increases mechanical efficiency. While there is no fossil evidence directly to support this theory, it makes sense in light of the numbers of pharyngeal arches that are visible in extant jawed (the Gnathostomes), which have seven arches, and primitive jawless vertebrates (the Agnatha), which have nine.

Meckel's cartilage is a piece of cartilage from which the mandibles (lower jaws) of vertebrates evolved. Originally it was the lower of two cartilages which supported the first gill arch (nearest the front) in early fish. Then it grew longer and stronger, and acquired muscles capable of closing the developing jaw. In early fish and in chondrichthyans (cartilaginous fish such as sharks), Meckel's cartilage continued to be the main component of the lower jaw. But in the adult forms of osteichthyans (bony fish) and their descendants (amphibians, reptiles, birds and mammals) the cartilage was covered in bone – although in their embryos the jaw initially develops as the Meckel's cartilage. In tetrapods the cartilage partially ossifies (changes to bone) at the rear end of the jaw and becomes the articular bone, which forms part of the jaw joint in all tetrapods except mammals.

== See also ==
- Cranial kinesis
- DLX gene family
- Entelognathus primordialis
- Glossohyal
- Gnathostomata (jawed vertebrates)
- Hox gene
- Hyomandibula
- Palatoquadrate
