= Akinesis =

Akinesis may refer to:

- Cranial akinesis, referring to skulls possessing no kinetic hinge
- Akinesia, the loss of the ability to create muscular movement in some diseases such as Parkinsons
