= Petrotilapia genalutea =

Conservation status
- Least Concern (IUCN 3.1)

Scientific classification
- Kingdom: Animalia
- Phylum: Chordata
- Class: Actinopterygii
- Order: Cichliformes
- Family: Cichlidae
- Genus: Petrotilapia
- Species: P. genalutea

Binomial name
- Petrotilapia genalutea A. C. Marsh, 1983

Species of fish

Petrotilapia genalutea is a species of cichlid endemic to Lake Malawi where it inhabits areas with rocky substrates from which it grazes algae. This species can reach a length 13.1 centimetres (5.2 in) SL. This species is also found in the aquarium trade.
