= Petrotilapia chrysos =

Conservation status
- Least Concern (IUCN 3.1)

Scientific classification
- Kingdom: Animalia
- Phylum: Chordata
- Class: Actinopterygii
- Order: Cichliformes
- Family: Cichlidae
- Genus: Petrotilapia
- Species: P. chrysos

Binomial name
- Petrotilapia chrysos Stauffer & van Snik, 1996

Species of fish

Petrotilapia chrysos is a species of cichlid endemic to Lake Malawi where it is only known from around the southern islands of Chinyankwazi and Chinyamwezi. It prefers rocky substrates where it can graze on the algae growing on the rocks.

== Length ==
This species can reach a length 13.1 centimetres (5.2 in) SL.
