= Aquatic feeding mechanisms =

Autonomous feeding of animals

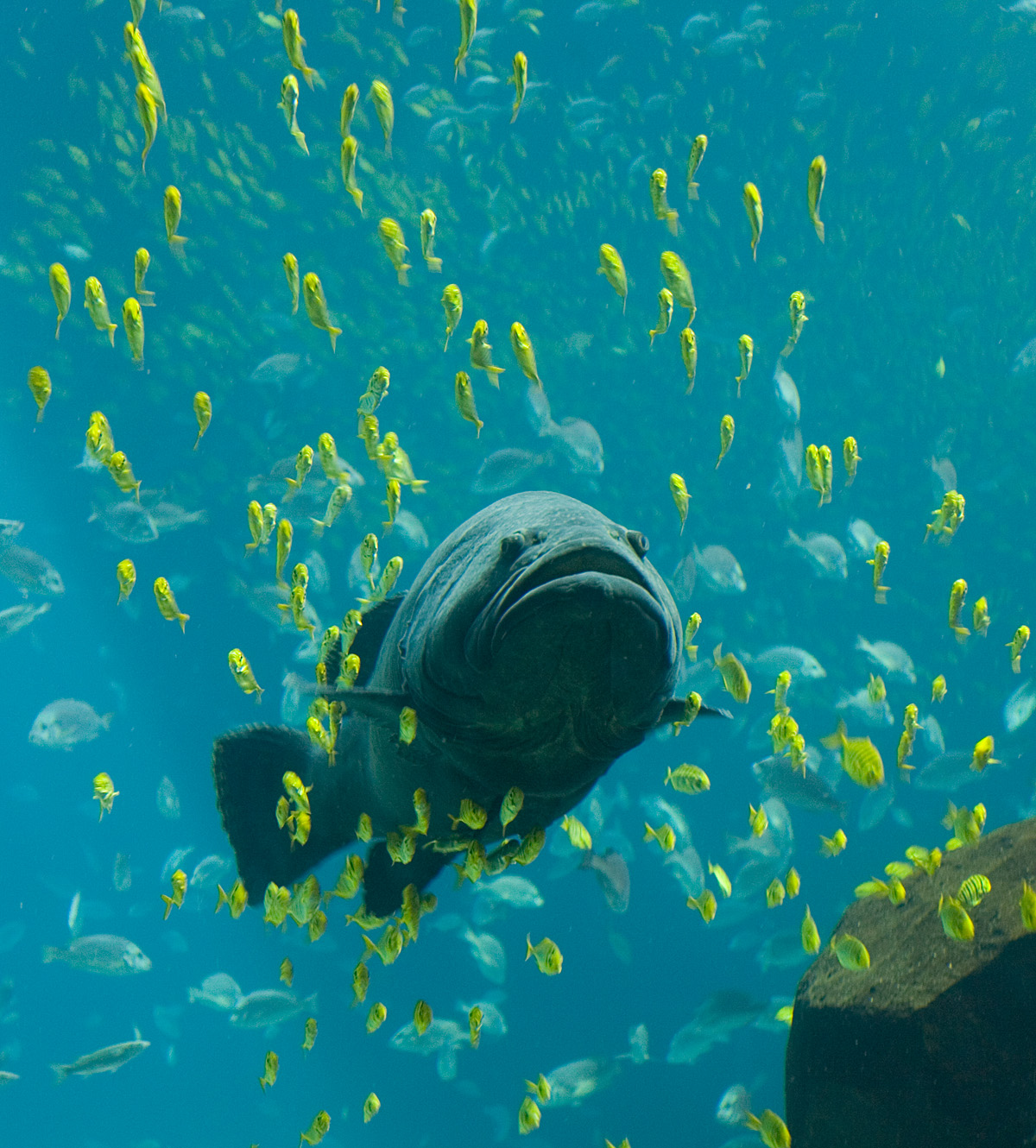
Groupers capture their prey by sucking them into their mouths

Aquatic feeding mechanisms face a special difficulty as compared to feeding on land, because the density of water is about the same as that of the prey, so the prey tends to be pushed away when the mouth is closed. This problem was first identified by Robert McNeill Alexander. As a result, underwater predators, especially bony fish, have evolved a number of specialized feeding mechanisms, such as filter feeding, ram feeding, suction feeding, protrusion, and pivot feeding.

Most underwater predators combine more than one of these basic principles. For example, a typical generalized predator, such as the cod, combines suction with some amount of protrusion and pivot feeding.

== Suction feeding ==
External videos
- Video of a red bay snook catching prey by suction feeding

Suction feeding is a method of ingesting a prey item in fluids by sucking the prey into the predator's mouth. It is a highly coordinated behavior achieved by the dorsal rotation of the dermatocranium, lateral expansion of the suspensorium, and the depression of the lower jaw and hyoid. Suction feeding leads to successful prey capture through rapid movements creating a drop in pressure in the buccal cavity causing the water in front of the mouth to rush into the oral cavity, entrapping the prey in this flow. This mode of feeding has two main phases: expansion and compression. The expansion phase involves the initial opening of the jaws to capture prey. These movements during the expansion phase are similar across all suction feeders with the kinesis of the skull leading to slight variations. During the compression phase, the jaws close and water is compressed out of the gills.

Though suction feeding can be seen across fish species, those with more cranial kinesis show an increase in suction potential as a result of more complex skull linkages that allow greater expansion of the buccal cavity and thereby create a greater negative pressure. Most commonly, this is achieved by increasing the lateral expansion of the skull. In addition, the derived trait of anterior protrusion via the premaxillary bone in the upper jaw is acknowledged to increase the force exerted on the prey to be engulfed. Protrusible jaws via a mobile premaxilla can only be seen in fishes within the Teleostei clade. However, a common misconception of these fishes is that suction feeding is the only or primary method employed. In Micropterus salmoides, ram feeding is the primary method for prey capture; however, they can modulate between the two methods or use both as with many teleosts. Also, it is commonly thought that fishes with more primitive characteristics also exhibit suction feeding. Although suction may be created upon the mouth opening in such fishes, the criteria for pure suction feeding includes little or no bodily movement towards their prey.

=== Tradeoffs ===
The morphologies and behaviors during suction feeding have led to three main proposed tradeoffs that determine the success of prey capture: the rate of jaw opening and closing, the mobility of the bony elements in the skull, and the ratio of ram to suction feeding behavior. The first two qualifications center around the situation that results from a highly kinetic skull. Having a highly mobile skull introduces a tradeoff between the ability to have high speed jaw opening (high kinesis) or higher bite transmission (lower kinesis). While there is a more complex relationship between mechanical advantage and the speed of lower jaw depression, there is consensus that species using high-speed attacks have more cranial kinesis compared to species that exhibit low speed attacks. Species that have a durophagous diet have also evolved skull morphologies to crush the hard-shelled prey that is a part of their diet. Durophagous species skulls consistently have more fused skulls and shorter jaw lengths. This morphology leads to the skulls being less kinetic than their piscivorous counterparts. Having shorter jaw lengths, with a more akinetic skull allows for an individual to have a higher bite force, compromising the ability to have a faster jaw opening when the jaw lengths are longer.

The third main tradeoff within suction feeding occurs with the incorporation of ram feeding with suction feeding behaviors. Ram feeding involves movement of the predator with its mouth open to engulf the prey. Most species use ram feeding combined with suction feeding to increase the chances of capturing elusive prey by swimming towards their prey while using suction to draw prey into the mouth. This diversity in relative use is quantified using the ram-suction index (RSI) that calculates the ratio of use for ram and suction during prey capture. The RSI ratio can be influenced by the morphology of the predator and by the elusiveness of the prey. Ram feeding and suction feeding are on opposite sides of the feeding spectrum, where extreme ram feeding is when a predator swims over an immobile prey item with open jaws to engulf the prey. Extreme suction feeding is demonstrated by sit-and-wait predators that rely on rapid depression of the jaws to capture prey (e.g., frogfish, Antennariidae). There is wide diversity on how much of each feeding strategy an individual uses, especially when body ram movements are considered. The relative use of ram and suction feeding is species dependent, but it can help determine the accuracy of prey capture.

The mouth aperture represents another tradeoff between the ability to capture large elusive prey with more chances of failure—large gape—or to capture smaller elusive prey with greater success—smaller gape. A predator with a small mouth aperture can generate strong suction force compared to an individual with a wider gape. This was demonstrated by Wainwright et al. (2007) by comparing the feeding success of the bluegill sunfish, Lepomis macrochirus, and the largemouth bass, Micropterus salmoides. L. macrochirus has a smaller gape and was found to have higher accuracy with higher flow velocity and acceleration while M. salmoides has a larger gape with lower accuracy and lower flow velocity and acceleration. However, with the larger gape the largemouth bass were able to capture larger elusive prey. Using ram feeding in combination with suction feeding can also influence the direction of water into the mouth of the predator. With use of ram, predators are able to change the flow of water around the mouth and focus the flow of water into the mouth. But with too much ram, a bow wave is created in front of the predator which can push the prey away from the predator's body. The mouth aperture and RSI represent the overall tradeoff between having a large gape with lower accuracy but being able to capture larger prey vs. having a smaller gape with increased accuracy but the size of prey is limited. The three main tradeoffs within the fish skull have occurred because of the high kinesis in the skull and the elusiveness of some prey types. However, having kinesis in the skull can enable a predator to evolve new techniques on increasing the performance of prey capture.

== Ram feeding ==
Ram feeding is a method of feeding underwater in which the predator moves forward with its mouth open, engulfing the prey along with the water surrounding it. During ram feeding, the prey remains fixed in space, and the predator moves its jaws past the prey to capture it. The motion of the head may induce a bow wave in the fluid which pushes the prey away from the jaws, but this can be avoided by allowing water to flow through the jaw. This can be accomplished by means of a swept-back mouth, as in balaenid whales, or by allowing water to flow out through the gills, as in sharks and herring. A number of species have evolved narrow snouts, as in gar fish and water snakes.

Herrings often hunt copepods. If they encounter copepods schooling in high concentrations, the herrings switch to ram feeding. They swim with their mouth wide open and their opercula fully expanded. Every several feet, they close and clean their gill rakers for a few milliseconds (filter feeding). The fish all open their mouths and opercula wide at the same time (the red gills are visible in the photo below—click to enlarge). The fish swim in a grid where the distance between them is the same as the jump length of the copepods.

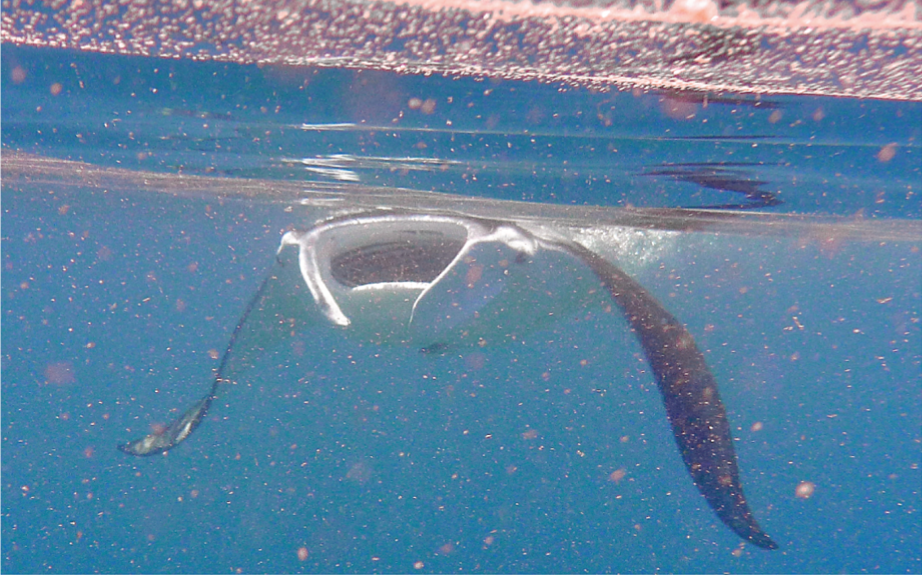
Foraging Mobula alfredi ram-feeding, swimming against the tidal current with its mouth open and sieving zooplankton from the water

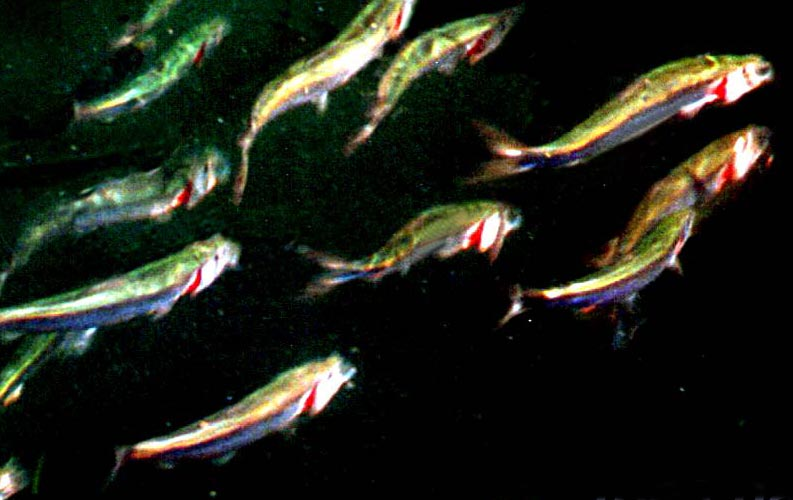
Herring ram-feeding on a school of copepods

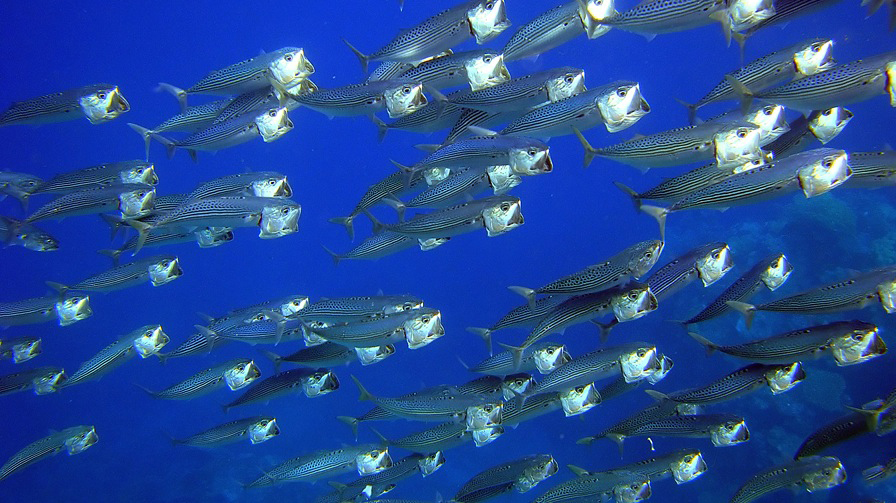
School of adult Indian mackerel ram feeding on macroplankton

== Lunge feeding ==
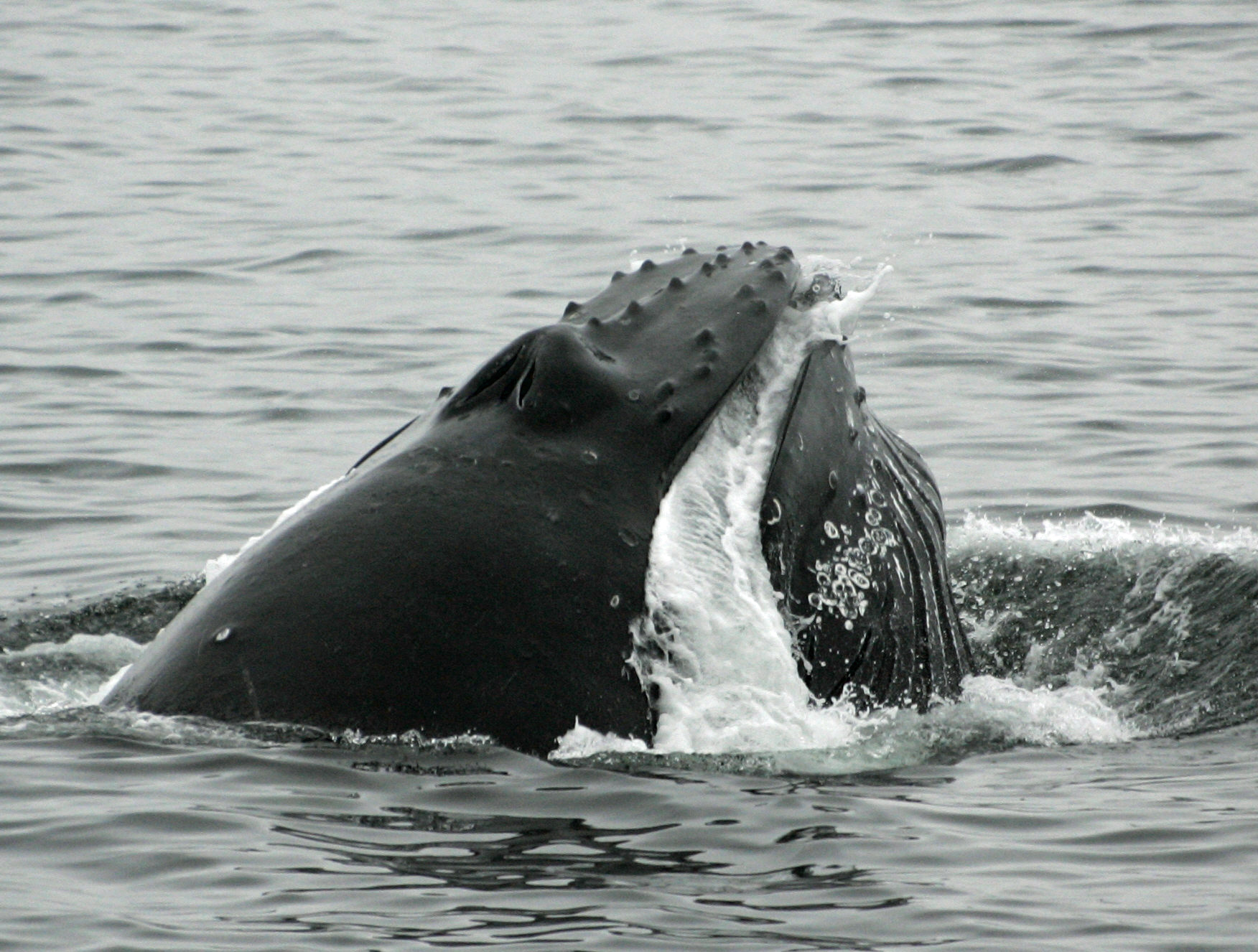
A humpback whale straining water through its baleen after lunging.

Rorquals feed on plankton by a technique called lunge feeding. Lunge feeding could be regarded as a kind of inverted suction feeding, during which a whale takes a huge gulp of water, which is then filtered through the baleen. Biomechanically this is a unique and extreme feeding method, for which the animal at first must accelerate to gain enough momentum to fold its elastic throat (buccal cavity) around the volume of water to be swallowed. Subsequently, the water flows back through the baleen, keeping back the food particles. The highly elastic and muscular buccal rills are a specialized adaptation to this feeding mode.

== Jaw protrusion ==
External videos
- Video of a slingjaw wrasse catching prey by protruding its jaw

Jaw protrusion is the outward movement of the premaxilla or mouthparts towards the prey, which is achieved via more mobile mechanical linkages in the articulations of the mouth. Vertebrate jaw protrusion is known only among modern bony fishes, which possess many forms of coupled linkages in their head. Remarkable examples are the slingjaw wrasse and the sand eel, which can protrude their mouth by several centimeters. This is usually done to extend the striking range of suction feeding, and the retraction of the jaw after protrusion can also help retrieval once the prey has been engulfed.

Another example of mouthpart protrusion is seen in dragonfly larvae (nymphs), which have hydraulic lower mandibles that can extend rapidly, protruding forward to seize prey and bring it to the top jaw.

== Pivot feeding ==
Pivot feeding is a method to transport the mouth towards the prey by an upward turning of the head, which is pivoting on the neck joint. Pipefish such as sea horses and sea dragons are specialized on this feeding mechanism. With prey capture times of down to 5 ms (shrimpfish Centriscus scutatus) this method is used by the fastest feeders in the animal kingdom.

The secret of the speed of pivot feeding is in a locking mechanism, in which the hyoid arch is folded under the head and is aligned with the urohyal which connects to the shoulder girdle. A four-bar linkage at first locks the head in a ventrally bent position by the alignment of two bars. The release of the locking mechanism jets the head up and moves the mouth toward the prey within 5–10 ms. The trigger mechanism of unlocking is debated, but is probably in lateral adduction.

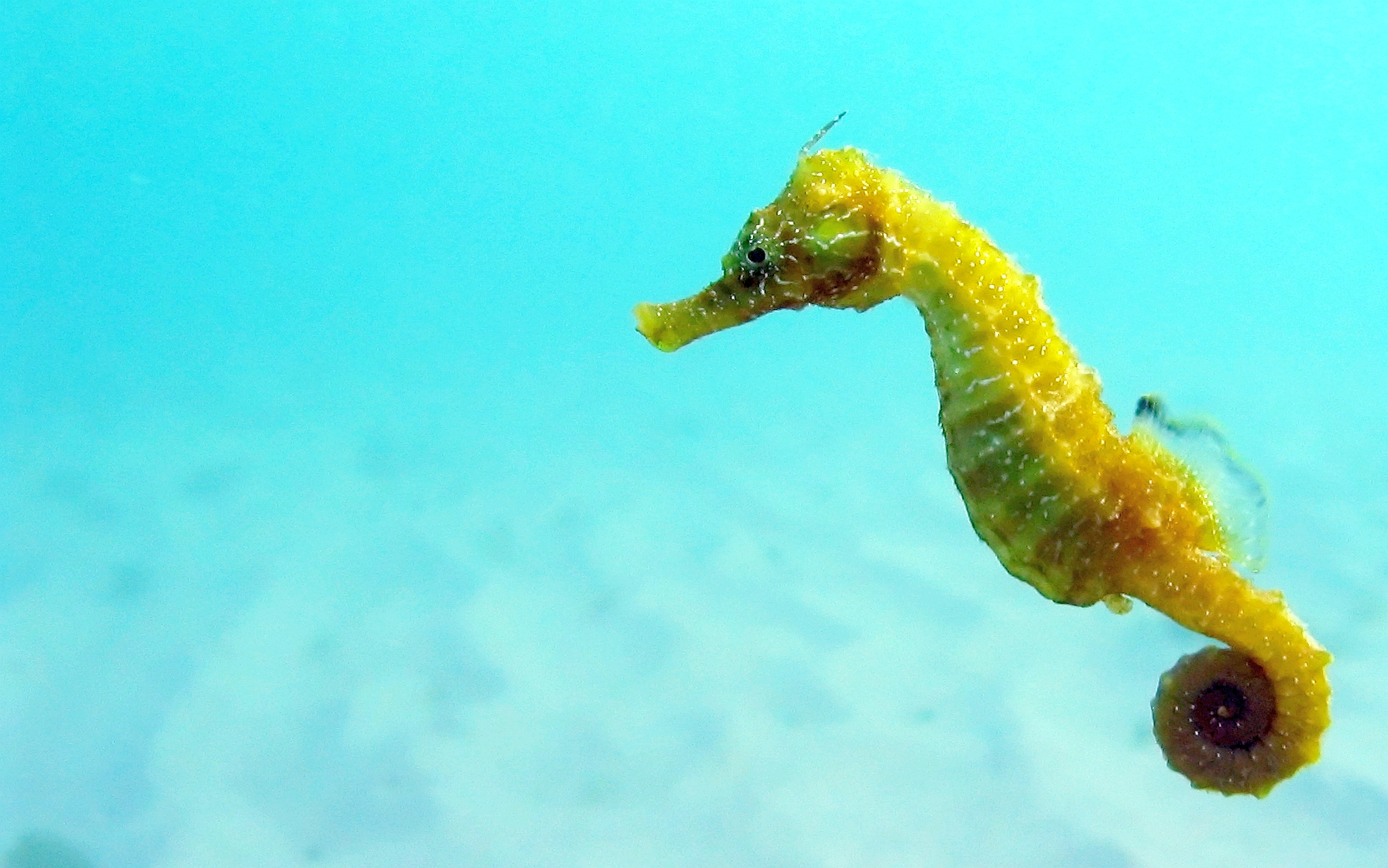
Seahorses rely on stealth to ambush small prey such as copepods. They use pivot feeding to catch the copepod, which involves rotating their snout at high speed and then sucking in the copepod.

== Filter versus suspension feeding ==
Krill feeding under high phytoplankton concentration (slowed down by a factor of 12)

These are contrasting methods for the removal of food particles from a water flow: for example, by the gill rakers of fish, the baleen of whales, or the ostia of sponges.

=== Filter feeding ===
In filter feeding, the water flow is primarily generated by the organism itself, for example by creating a pressure gradient, by active swimming, or by ciliary movements.

=== Suspension feeding ===
In suspension feeding, the water flow is primarily external and the particles themselves move with respect to the ambient water flow, such as in sea lilies.

== See also ==
- Cleaner fish
- Feeding behaviour of fish
- Lepidophagy
- List of feeding behaviours
- Paedophagy
