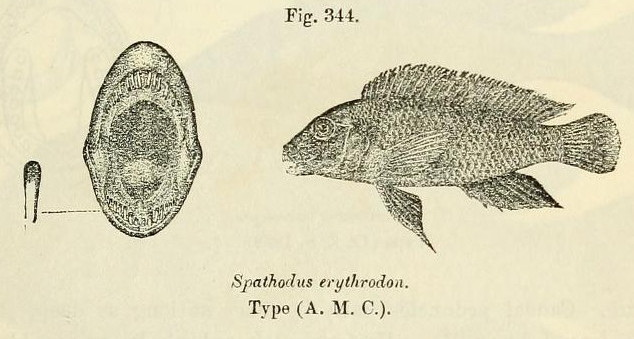
- Spathodus

Scientific classification
- Domain: Eukaryota
- Kingdom: Animalia
- Phylum: Chordata
- Class: Actinopterygii
- Order: Cichliformes
- Family: Cichlidae
- Tribe: Eretmodini
- Genus: Spathodus; Boulenger, 1900

Type species
- Spathodus erythrodon Boulenger, 1900

= Spathodus =

Genus of fishes

Spathodus is a small genus of cichlids endemis to Lake Tanganyika in east Africa.

== Species ==
There are currently two recognized species in this genus:

- Spathodus erythrodon Boulenger, 1900
- Spathodus marlieri Poll, 1950
