= Petrotilapia nigra =

Conservation status
- Least Concern (IUCN 3.1)

Scientific classification
- Kingdom: Animalia
- Phylum: Chordata
- Class: Actinopterygii
- Order: Cichliformes
- Family: Cichlidae
- Genus: Petrotilapia
- Species: P. nigra

Binomial name
- Petrotilapia nigra A. C. Marsh, 1983

Species of fish

Petrotilapia nigra is a species of cichlid endemic to Lake Malawi where it prefers areas with rocky substrates. It grazes on diatoms that it finds on the algae growing on the rocks. This species can reach a length 12.2 centimetres (4.8 in) SL. This species can also be found in the aquarium trade.
