= Spathodus marlieri =

Conservation status
- Least Concern (IUCN 3.1)

Scientific classification
- Kingdom: Animalia
- Phylum: Chordata
- Class: Actinopterygii
- Order: Cichliformes
- Family: Cichlidae
- Genus: Spathodus
- Species: S. marlieri

Binomial name
- Spathodus marlieri Poll, 1950

Species of fish

Spathodus marlieri is a species of cichlid endemic to Lake Tanganyika where it is only known from the northern portion of the lake. This species prefers areas with rocky substrates in very shallow waters to a depth of about 2 metres (6.6 ft). This species can reach a length of 10 centimetres (3.9 in) TL. It can also be found in the aquarium trade. The specific name honours the Belgian zoologist Georges Marlier.
