= Petrotilapia tridentiger =

Conservation status
- Least Concern (IUCN 3.1)

Scientific classification
- Kingdom: Animalia
- Phylum: Chordata
- Class: Actinopterygii
- Order: Cichliformes
- Family: Cichlidae
- Genus: Petrotilapia
- Species: P. tridentiger

Binomial name
- Petrotilapia tridentiger Trewavas, 1935

Species of fish

Petrotilapia tridentiger is a species of cichlid endemic to Lake Malawi where it prefers shallow waters with rocky substrates. This species can reach a length 17 centimetres (6.7 in) TL. This species can also be found in the aquarium trade.
