= Glossohyal =

Tongue and hyoid bone of a fish

The glossohyal, in fish anatomy, is the tongue and hyoid bone. It is the lingual plate, which is a dermal toothed bone that covers or fuses with the basihyal. The glossohyal changes its proportions as the fish increases in size.
