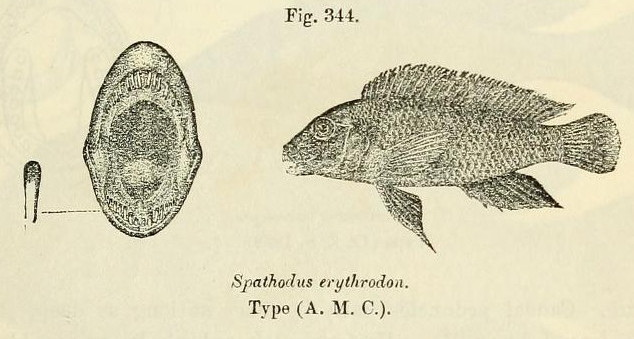

Conservation status
- Least Concern (IUCN 3.1)

Scientific classification
- Kingdom: Animalia
- Phylum: Chordata
- Class: Actinopterygii
- Order: Cichliformes
- Family: Cichlidae
- Genus: Spathodus
- Species: S. erythrodon

Binomial name
- Spathodus erythrodon Boulenger, 1900

= Spathodus erythrodon =

Species of fish

Spathodus erythrodon is a species of cichlid endemic to Lake Tanganyika though absent from the southern end of the lake. Preferring areas with rubble or pebble substrates, this species prefers very shallow waters usually being found in waters of less than 1 foot (0.30 m) depth. This species can reach a length of 8.5 centimetres (3.3 in) TL. It can also be found in the aquarium trade.
