= Petrotilapia =

Scientific classification
- Kingdom: Animalia
- Phylum: Chordata
- Class: Actinopterygii
- Order: Cichliformes
- Family: Cichlidae
- Tribe: Haplochromini
- Genus: Petrotilapia; Trewavas, 1935

Type species
- Petrotilapia tridentiger Trewavas, 1935

Genus of fishes

Petrotilapia is a genus of cichlids endemic to Lake Malawi.

== Species ==
There are currently 10 recognized species in this genus:

- Petrotilapia chrysos Stauffer & van Snik, 1996
- Petrotilapia flaviventris Lundeba, Stauffer & Konings, 2011
- Petrotilapia genalutea A. C. Marsh, 1983
- Petrotilapia microgalana Ruffing, A. Lambert & Stauffer, 2006
- Petrotilapia mumboensis Lundeba, Stauffer & Konings, 2011
- Petrotilapia nigra A. C. Marsh, 1983
- Petrotilapia palingnathos Lundeba, Stauffer & Konings, 2011
- Petrotilapia pyroscelos Lundeba, Stauffer & Konings, 2011
- Petrotilapia tridentiger Trewavas, 1935
- Petrotilapia xanthos Lundeba, Stauffer & Konings, 2011
