= Cranial kinesis =

Movement of skull bones relative to each other in vertebrates

Cranial kinesis is movement of skull bones relative to one another, apart from the opening and closing of the lower jaw at the jaw joint. In most discussions the term refers especially to movement between the upper jaw, palate, quadrate and the braincase. Cranial kinesis contrasts with an akinetic skull, in which the bones of the skull roof, palate and suspensorium are effectively locked together by sutures, fusion or rigid articulations.

Kinetic skulls occur in many vertebrate groups, but the degree and mechanical importance of the movement vary widely. In fishes, cranial kinesis is often associated with rapid expansion of the mouth cavity during suction feeding and with protrusion of the jaws. In birds it commonly permits elevation or flexion of the upper beak. In snakes and some lizards, it contributes to large gape, prey transport and swallowing. Conversely, animals that rely on very high bite forces, such as crocodilians, usually have rigid skulls with little or no intracranial movement. In mammals the skull is generally akinetic; this rigidity is associated partly with the evolution of a bony secondary palate and with changes in jaw-muscle arrangement and occlusion.

== Functional significance ==
The functional effect of cranial kinesis depends on which elements move and how they are linked. A kinetic joint may increase gape, change the orientation of the tooth rows, allow the upper jaw to protrude, absorb impact, or help transmit muscular forces around the skull. In aquatic feeding, small movements of many cranial elements can be coordinated to enlarge the buccal cavity and reduce pressure inside the mouth, drawing prey and water inward. In terrestrial predators, mobility may instead help seize, reposition and swallow prey that cannot be chewed into small pieces. In herbivores, kinesis can alter the direction of the bite or chewing stroke and may help maintain contact between tooth batteries or keratinous beaks and the food surface.

Cranial kinesis is not always a simple advantage. Mobile skulls can be mechanically complex and may sacrifice stiffness. A joint that improves manipulation or suction can reduce the ability of the skull to resist bending and torsion unless compensated by strong ligaments, overlapping bones or specialised muscle arrangements. For this reason, the evolution of cranial kinesis is often interpreted as a trade-off between mobility, strength and feeding performance.

== Terminology and mechanisms ==
Several named forms of cranial kinesis describe the position of the principal joint or bending zone. These terms are useful comparisons, but real skulls often combine more than one motion.

- Metakinesis is movement between the dermatocranium and the occipital or posterior braincase region.
- Mesokinesis is movement at a more anterior hinge in the skull roof, commonly near the frontoparietal region.
- Prokinesis is movement between the braincase and the facial skeleton, usually at or near the nasofrontal or craniofacial hinge.
- Rhynchokinesis is flexion within the upper beak, rather than at its base.
- Streptostyly is anteroposterior, and sometimes transverse, movement of the quadrate bone about its articulation with the skull.
- Neurokinesis refers to movement between the braincase and palate, for example at the basipterygoid joint.

The joints involved may be fibrous syndesmoses, cartilaginous zones, synovial joints or flexible bending regions of bone. In living animals the actual range of movement is usually small, but small displacements can have large mechanical consequences when they occur rapidly or when several elements move together.

== Fish ==
Fishes include the most extreme examples of kinetic vertebrate skulls. Many species have multiple mobile bars and linkages connecting the jaws, palate, hyoid arch, opercular bones and neurocranium. During a suction-feeding strike these elements may move in a tightly timed sequence: the lower jaw depresses, the hyoid moves downward and backward, the suspensorium expands laterally, and the upper jaw may protrude toward the prey. The result is rapid expansion of the mouth cavity and an inward flow of water.

=== Chondrichthyans ===
In cartilaginous fishes such as sharks and rays, the upper jaw is not fused to the braincase in the same way as in most tetrapods. The jaw cartilages are suspended partly by the hyomandibula and associated ligaments, producing a system in which the jaws can protrude and rotate during feeding. In many sharks the upper jaw swings downward and forward as the mouth opens, helping the teeth meet prey more directly and reducing the tendency to push prey away from the mouth.

=== Actinopterygian fish ===
Ray-finned fishes show a wide range of cranial kinetic mechanisms. Teleosts in particular commonly possess protrusible jaws. Jaw protrusion is produced by linkages among the premaxilla, maxilla, lower jaw and suspensorium, and it can increase suction-feeding efficiency by moving the mouth aperture closer to the prey. Different teleost lineages have modified this system for biting, scraping, ram feeding, plankton capture or specialised prey extraction. As a general evolutionary trend, many ray-finned fishes show increasing liberation of cranial bones and greater mechanical coupling among the jaws, hyoid and opercular series.

=== Sarcopterygian fish ===
Sarcopterygians, the lobe-finned fishes and tetrapod relatives, include both kinetic and relatively rigid skulls. Early lungfishes developed upper jaws closely attached to the braincase, a condition associated with crushing or feeding on hard substrates. Other fossil sarcopterygians retained mobile joints in the skull roof and palate. These patterns are important because early tetrapods inherited many cranial elements and feeding mechanisms from sarcopterygian ancestors, even though terrestrial feeding later favoured different mechanical arrangements.

== Amphibians ==
Modern amphibians have skulls that are generally reduced compared with those of early tetrapods. Many skull-roof bones have been lost, fused or miniaturised, and the resulting skull may be flexible even when it lacks the well-defined hinges seen in birds or squamates. Cranial kinesis in amphibians is therefore often more subtle and difficult to classify.

In frogs, obvious cranial kinesis has generally not been observed. The skull is light and often strengthened by fusion, and prey capture relies mainly on tongue projection, jaw opening and whole-head movements rather than on mobility between skull bones. Salamanders also usually show little intracranial mobility, although aquatic forms may retain feeding movements linked to suction and hyobranchial expansion.

Caecilians are the clearest living amphibian example of cranial kinesis. Their skulls are adapted for burrowing and may be compact and strongly ossified, but some taxa retain mobility between the squamosal, quadrate and adjacent skull elements. Caecilians are the only living amphibians known to exhibit streptostyly, and movement of the quadrate has been recorded even in dead specimens. In some caecilians, flexible regions between the parietal and squamosal may allow slight bending of the skull during burrowing, although the performance consequences differ among species with solid and fenestrated skulls.

== Reptiles ==
Living reptiles show a broad spectrum from essentially akinetic skulls to the highly kinetic skulls of snakes. Lepidosaurs, the group including lizards, snakes and the tuatara, have been central to studies of cranial kinesis because their skulls display many combinations of mesokinesis, metakinesis and streptostyly.

=== Crocodilians ===
Crocodilians, including crocodiles, alligators, caimans and gharials, have highly sutured and functionally rigid skulls. Their cranial akinesis is associated with a feeding apparatus capable of resisting large forces during biting, shaking and prey restraint. The broad secondary palate, reinforced snout and strong sutural contacts help distribute stresses generated by powerful adductor muscles and by contact with struggling prey.

=== Lizards ===
Most lizards have some potential for cranial kinesis, although the magnitude varies considerably among groups. Three commonly discussed movements are mesokinesis, metakinesis and streptostyly. In mesokinesis the anterior part of the skull can rotate relative to the posterior skull near the frontal-parietal suture. In metakinesis the dermatocranium moves relative to the braincase. In streptostyly the quadrate swings at its upper articulation, affecting the position of the lower jaw and palate.

The functional role of lizard cranial kinesis remains debated. In some species, movement may help grip prey, shift stresses away from delicate regions of the skull, or increase the efficiency of jaw closing. In others the actual motion during feeding is slight, and the skull may behave nearly rigidly despite the presence of potential hinges. Lizards that specialise in strong bites or resistant prey often have reduced kinesis, strengthened skulls, or fused elements. Chameleons, agamids, phrynosomatids and amphisbaenians are commonly cited as having relatively akinetic skulls compared with more mobile lizard groups.

=== Snakes ===
Snakes possess the most extreme cranial kinesis among living tetrapods. Their skulls do not simply "unhinge"; instead, they contain a set of mobile articulations that allow the left and right sides of the jaws, palate and suspensorium to move semi-independently. The quadrate is elongated and mobile, the mandibles are joined at the front by an elastic ligament rather than a rigid bony symphysis, and the maxillae, palatines and pterygoids can shift during prey transport.

These movements increase gape and permit snakes to swallow prey much larger than the diameter of the resting head. During ingestion, snakes alternately advance the left and right sides of the upper jaw and palate over the prey while the lower jaws hold and release in sequence. Studies of cottonmouth snakes have divided swallowing movements into hold, advance and close phases, each involving coordinated displacement of cranial bones.

=== Tuatara ===
The tuatara has a relatively akinetic skull compared with squamates. The upper temporal bar is complete and the cranial elements are more rigidly braced. Adults therefore lack the pronounced streptostyly and mesokinesis seen in many lizards. Some authors have suggested that juveniles may have slightly greater cranial mobility before later ossification and sutural closure reduce movement.

== Dinosaurs and fossil archosaurs ==
Cranial kinesis in extinct dinosaurs is difficult to demonstrate because movement cannot be observed directly. Researchers infer possible kinesis from joint shape, sutural morphology, muscle reconstructions and comparisons with living relatives such as birds and crocodilians. However, a joint-like contact in a fossil skull does not by itself prove that movement occurred in life; cartilage, ligaments and soft tissues may have stabilised the joint.

Several forms of kinesis have been proposed for dinosaurs. Streptostyly has been suggested for some theropods and ornithischians, prokinesis for bird-like theropods and early birds, and metakinesis for some taxa with apparently flexible skull-roof contacts. Many of these proposals remain controversial, and some skulls once interpreted as kinetic have later been considered functionally rigid.

=== Pleurokinesis in ornithopods ===
Pleurokinesis is a hypothesised feeding mechanism in ornithopod dinosaurs, especially hadrosaurs. In this model, the maxilla and jugal regions of the upper jaw moved laterally as the lower jaw closed, producing a transverse power stroke that helped grind plant material between large dental batteries. The hypothesis was developed to explain the wear patterns and geometry of ornithopod teeth, which differ from the simple vertical shearing expected in an immobile skull.

Hadrosaur dental microwear has been used to test these ideas, with some analyses supporting complex jaw movements rather than a simple orthal bite. The exact amount and location of cranial movement remain debated, but ornithopods are an important example of how fossil cranial kinesis is studied through a combination of morphology, biomechanics and wear evidence.

== Birds ==
Birds are the best-known living tetrapods with widespread cranial kinesis. Most birds can elevate the upper beak relative to the braincase to some degree, and many species can flex the bill along its length. These movements are produced by interactions among the quadrate, pterygoid, palatine, jugal bar and craniofacial hinge. When the lower jaw opens, the quadrate and palate can transmit force forward, raising or bending the upper beak.

Zusi recognised three broad forms of avian cranial kinesis:

- Prokinesis, in which the upper beak moves mainly at a craniofacial hinge near its base.
- Amphikinesis, in which the upper jaw bends both near the base and farther forward because several bars of the beak are flexible.
- Rhynchokinesis, in which bending occurs within the upper beak itself.

The amount of kinesis correlates with feeding ecology. Parrots use a highly mobile upper beak together with a strong tongue and lower jaw to manipulate and crack food. Shorebirds may use rhynchokinesis to probe mud or sand and grasp buried prey without opening the entire bill. Hummingbirds and swifts have specialised forms of bill and skull movement associated with nectar feeding or aerial insect capture, although the details are still not fully understood.

=== Rhynchokinesis ===
Rhynchokinesis is the ability to flex the upper beak, or rhinotheca, at a point along its length. In upward flexion the tips of the upper and lower beak diverge; in downward flexion the tips can remain close together while a gap opens near the middle of the bill. Rhynchokinesis is best known in shorebirds, but it also occurs in cranes, swifts, hummingbirds and furnariids.

Several subtypes are recognised according to the position of the bending zone, including distal, proximal, central, double and extensive rhynchokinesis. Distal rhynchokinesis is common in probing shorebirds, in which the end of the bill can open while much of the bill remains inserted in sediment. This allows precise capture of small prey in mud or sand. Proximal and double rhynchokinesis involve different hinge positions and may reflect both functional adaptation and phylogenetic history.

== Mammals ==
Mammalian skulls are generally akinetic. The bones of the palate, face and braincase are firmly sutured, and the jaw joint is formed between the dentary and squamosal rather than between the articular and quadrate as in many non-mammalian vertebrates. A rigid skull helps maintain precise tooth occlusion during chewing and supports the forces generated by differentiated teeth and complex jaw muscles. The bony secondary palate, important in separating the nasal passage from the oral cavity, also reduces the possibility of movement between the upper jaw and braincase.

Hares and jackrabbits have been cited as a possible exception. In these animals a suture between regions of the fetal braincase remains open in adults, forming a possible intracranial joint. This joint has been interpreted as a mechanism for absorbing impact forces during high-speed running and landing, although the degree of active movement is limited compared with the kinesis of birds, snakes or fishes.

== Study methods ==
Cranial kinesis is studied using anatomical dissection, high-speed video, X-ray motion analysis, computed tomography, finite element modelling and comparisons among living and fossil taxa. In living animals, X-ray reconstruction of moving morphology can measure small three-dimensional movements of bones hidden beneath skin and muscles. In fossils, researchers rely on joint surfaces, sutures, muscle attachment sites and biomechanical modelling. Because soft tissues are rarely preserved, claims of kinesis in extinct animals are usually treated as hypotheses that require multiple lines of evidence.

== See also ==
- Fish jaw
- Snake skull
- Bird anatomy
