= Redbreast =

Redbreast may refer to:

- HMS Redbreast, several British Royal Navy ships
- Redbreast-class gunboat, a Royal Navy class of gunboats in commission from 1889 to 1921
- Hull Kingston Rovers, a British rugby league football club
- Redbreast (whiskey), a pure pot still whiskey
- The Redbreast, a crime novel
- Papilio alcmenor, a swallowtail butterfly commonly known as the redbreast

== See also ==
- Redbreast sunfish
- Redbreast tilapia
- Redbreast wrasse
- Robin redbreast (disambiguation)
