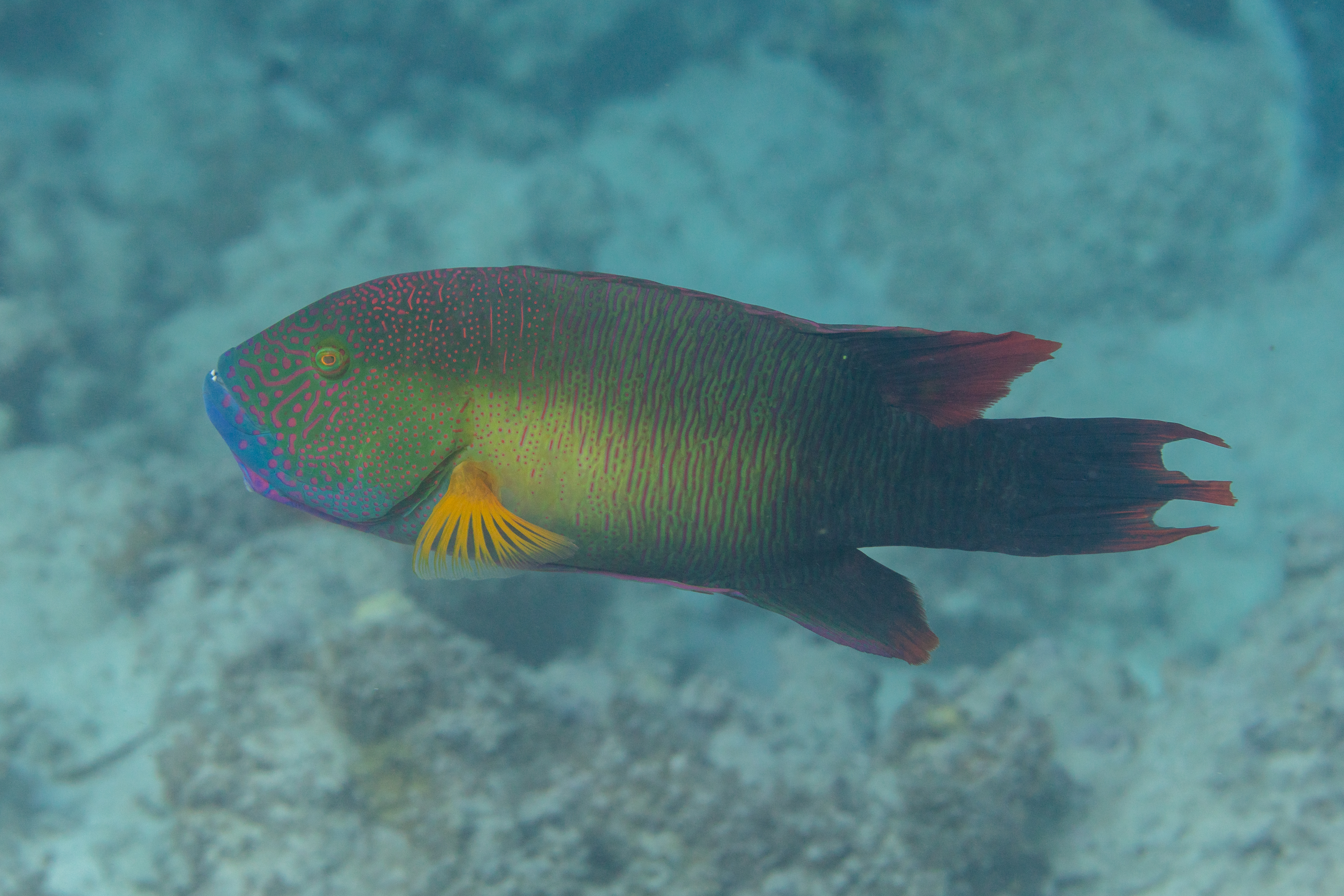
- Tripletail wrasse (Cheilinus trilobatus)
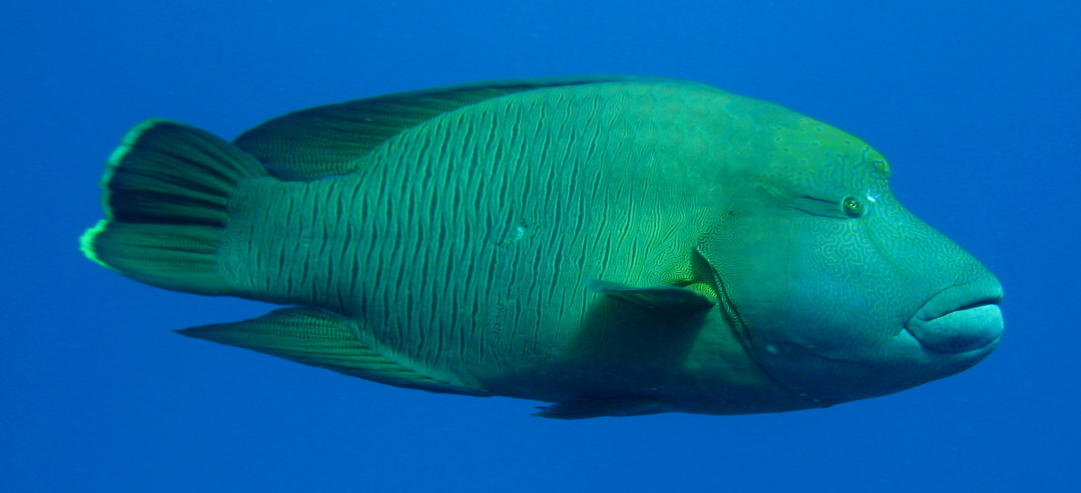
- Humphead wrasse (Crassilabrus undulatus)

Scientific classification
- Kingdom: Animalia
- Phylum: Chordata
- Class: Actinopterygii
- Division: Teleostei
- Order: Labriformes
- Family: Labridae
- Subfamily: Cheilininae; Bleeker, 1862

Genera
- See text

= Cheilininae =

Type of fish

The cheiline wrasses or flasherwrasses are saltwater fish of the subfamily Cheilininae, a subgroup of the wrasse family (Labridae). They are distributed throughout the Pacific and Indian Oceans, as well as the Red Sea.

== Biology ==
Cheiline wrasses largely exhibit monandric protogyny. In such cases, this means all individuals are born functionally female, but mature females can change sex and become functionally male. However, some species also exhibit diandric protogyny and functional gonochorism. In diandric protogyny, individuals can be born either female or male, and individuals that are born female can become male. In functional gonochorism, individuals are born functionally either male or female, and remain so for their entire life; there is no sex change.

== Taxonomy ==
This group was formerly classified as a tribe, but is now better treated as a subfamily. Phylogenetic studies regularly find that the wrasses of the subfamily Cheilininae are most closely related to parrotfish (subfamily Scarinae); cheilines and scarines are sister groups.

The relationship of the genus Doratonotus with Cheilininae is uncertain. Initially, based on morphological analyses by Westneat (1993), Cheilininae was considered to be composed of two subgroups, i.e., the "cheiline" wrasses and the "pseudocheiline" wrasses. At the time, the adjective "cheilinin" was used to describe fish in the subfamily Cheilininae. Doratonotus was considered to be the basalmost "cheiline" genus. However, Westneat & Alfaro (2005) showed that "pseudocheilines" and "cheilines" were not each other's closest relatives. As Doratonotus was not included in study, its placement relative to Cheilinini is uncertain. Later studies have recovered it in the Pseudolabrinae, where it is now placed. The pseudocheiline wrasses eventually formed the subfamily Cirrhilabrinae, originally proposed as a tribe in 1999, but are still sometimes informally referred to as pseudocheilines despite this.

Although the 4 genera recognized in Cheilininae do form a monophyletic clade with each other, their relationship with each other was somewhat problematic as the genus Cheilinus appears to be paraphyletic. This was resolved in a 2025 study which validated the genera Crassilabrus and Concholabrus; this paper's treatment is accepted by the World Register of Marine Species but not Eschmeyer's Catalog of Fishes.

The following cladogram is based on the aforementioned 2025 study:

- Cheilininae
  - Cheilinus
  - - - Wetmorella
      - - Crassilabrus
        - - Concholabrus
          - Epibulus
    - Oxycheilinus

=== Genera ===
Based on Eschmeyer's Catalog of Fishes:

Genus	Image
Cheilinus	C. lunulatus
Epibulus	E. brevis
Oxycheilinus	O. digramma
Wetmorella	W. albofasciata
