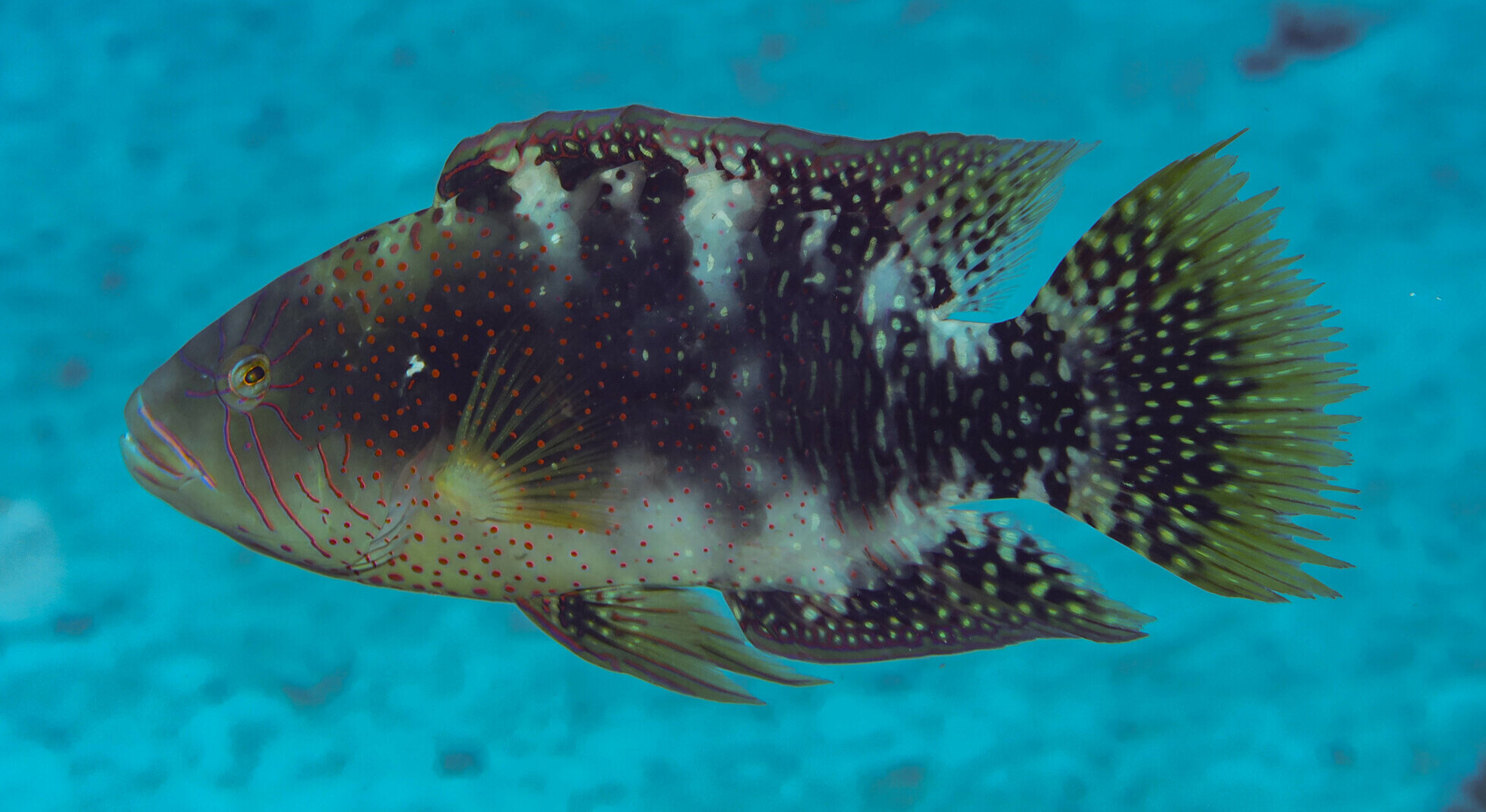
- Red Sea

Scientific classification
- Kingdom: Animalia
- Phylum: Chordata
- Class: Actinopterygii
- Order: Labriformes
- Family: Labridae
- Genus: Cheilinus
- Species: C. abudjubbe

Binomial name
- Cheilinus abudjubbe Rüppell, 1835

= Cheilinus abudjubbe =

Species of fish

Cheilinus abudjubbe, the Abudjubbe wrasse, is a species of ray-finned fish from the family Labridae, the wrasses. It is found in the western Indian Ocean and the Red Sea. This species was formally described by Eduard Rüppell in 1835, no type locality was given but it is thought to have been Jeddah. This taxon is regarded as a synonym of the tripletail wrasse (Cheilinus trilobatus) by some authorities.
