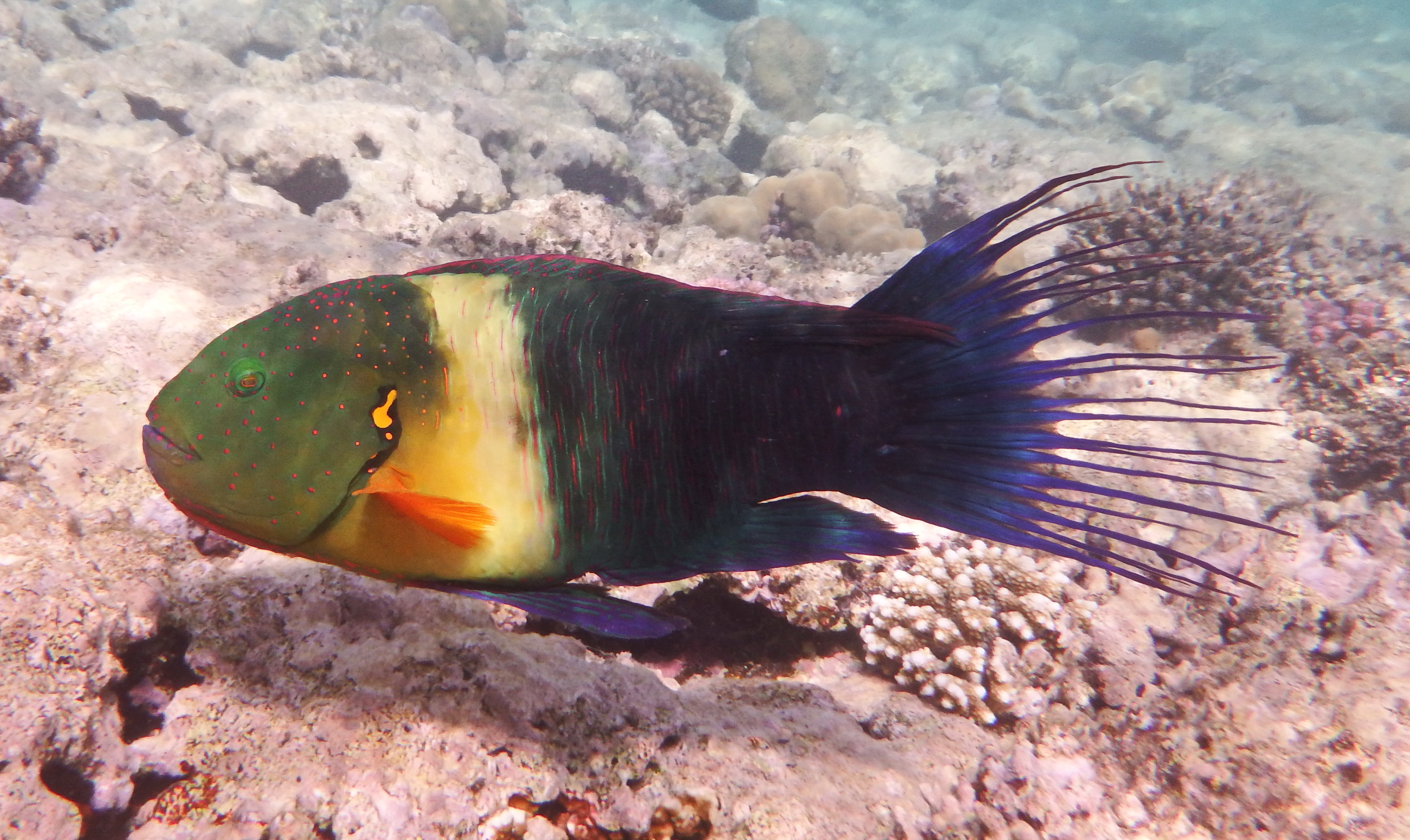
- Male
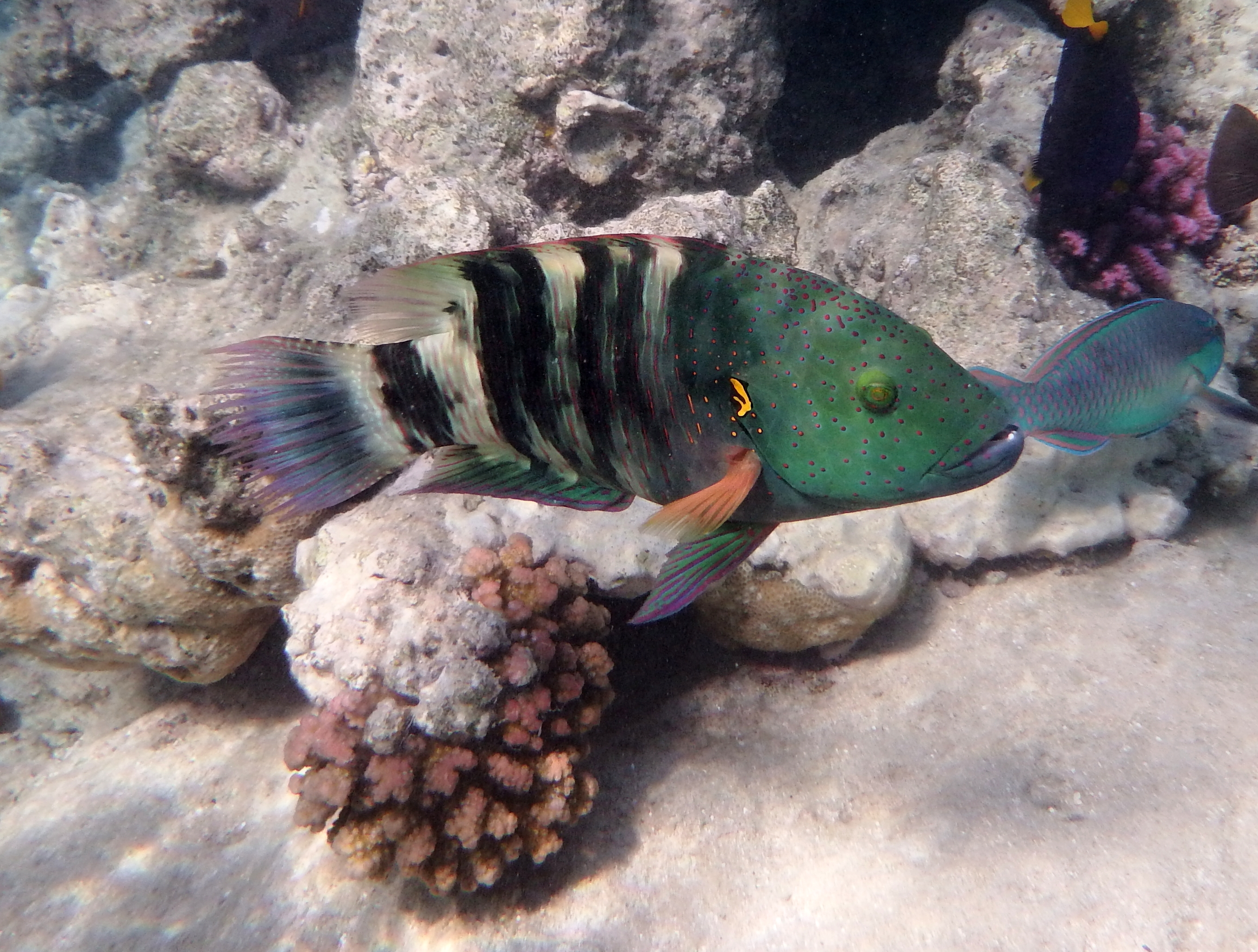
- Female

Conservation status
- Least Concern (IUCN 3.1)

Scientific classification
- Kingdom: Animalia
- Phylum: Chordata
- Class: Actinopterygii
- Division: Teleostei
- Order: Labriformes
- Family: Labridae
- Genus: Cheilinus
- Species: C. lunulatus

Binomial name
- Cheilinus lunulatus (Forsskål, 1775)

Synonyms
- Labrus lunulatus Forsskål, 1775; Cheilinus lunifer Nichols, 1923

= Broomtail wrasse =

Species of fish

The broomtail wrasse (Cheilinus lunulatus) is a species of marine ray-finned fish belonging to the family Labridae, the wrasses. This wrasse occurs in the Western Indian Ocean and has been recorded in the Eastern Mediterranean Sea.

== Taxonomy ==
The broomtail wrasse was first formally described as Labrus lunulatus in 1775 by the Swedish zoologist Peter Forsskål with no type locality given. This was later determined as Jeddah in Saudi Arabia. This taxon was later reclassified in to the genus Cheilinus which had been described in 1801 by Bernard Germain de Lacépède in 1801. This genus is classified in the subfamily Cheilininae, the flasher wrasses, in the wrasse family Labridae in the order Labriformes.

== Etymology ==
The broomtail wrasse is a member of the genus Cheilinus, a name which means "lipped" and is presumed to be a reference to the extendable upper lip of the type species of the genus C. trilobatus. The specific name, lunulatus, means "like the moon", an allusion to the crecsent-shaped yellow marking on the gill cover.

== Description ==
Cheilinus lunulatus has its dorsal fin supported by 9 spines and 10 soft rays while the anal fin contains3 spines and 8 soft rays. It has a body depth which fits into its standard length between 2.4 and 2.7 times, the older the fish the less dep its body is. Juveniles have an almost straight dorsal profile to the head and as they grow the snout gets steeper, reaching and angle of 60° in adult males. The adult males also have very long pelvic fins, nearly double the length of the pectoral fins and reaching past the spiny part of the anal fin. They also have extended lobes on the dorsal and anal fins, these nearly extend as far as the caudal fin. The adult females are green, with 4 dark olive bars, with pink and green central lines. Both males and females have scattered pink dots on the head, the lips and chin are bright blue. The females also have vivid yellow pectoral fins and a vertically lengthened black spot enclosing an irregular yellow blotch on the gill cover. The adult males have dark olive bodies posterior to the pectoral fins, marked with vertical pink and green lines on the scales, with an irregular yellow bar on the front part of the body, passing under the pectoral fins. The males rach a total length of 50 cm (20 in), although 35 cm (14 in) is more typical.

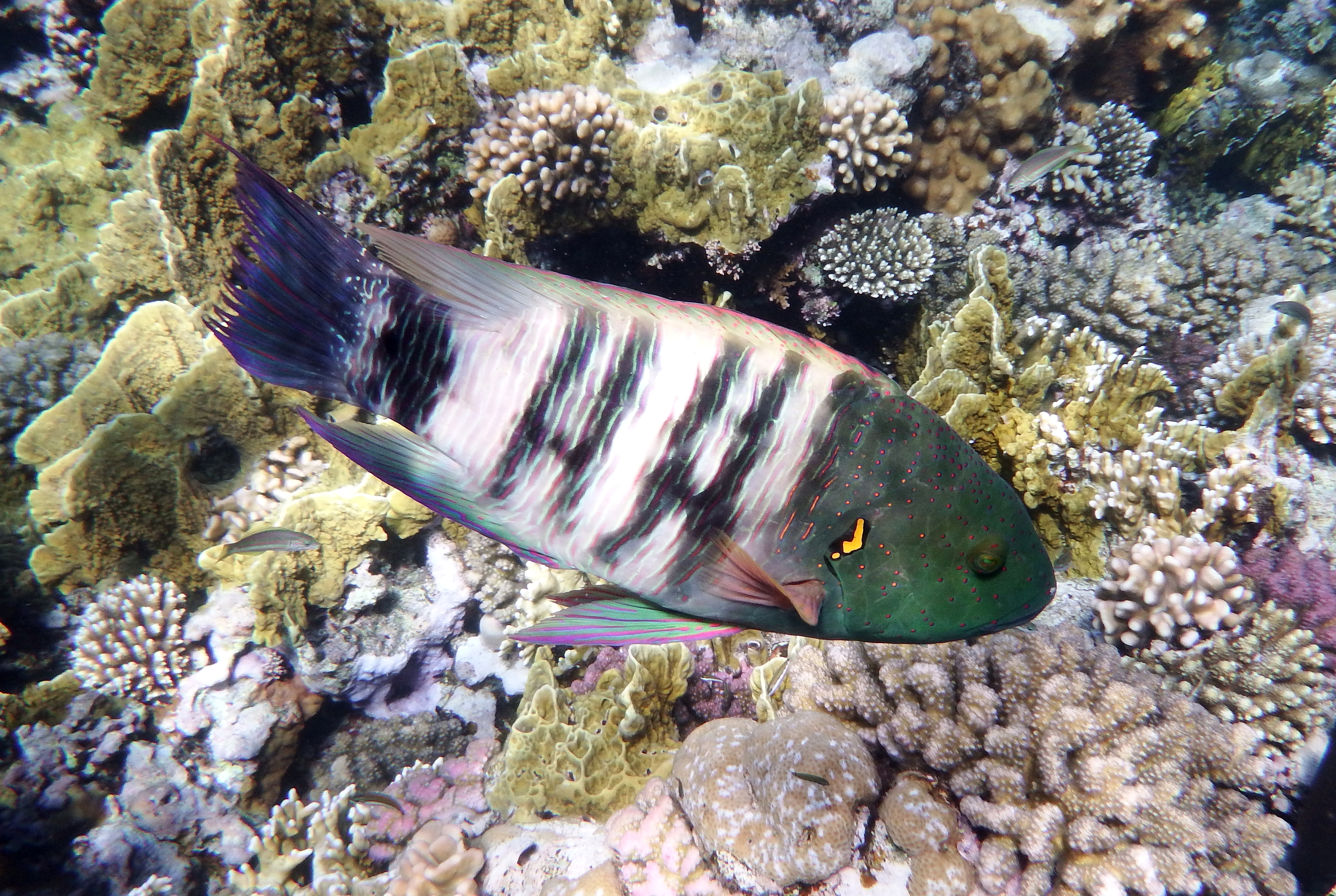
Female

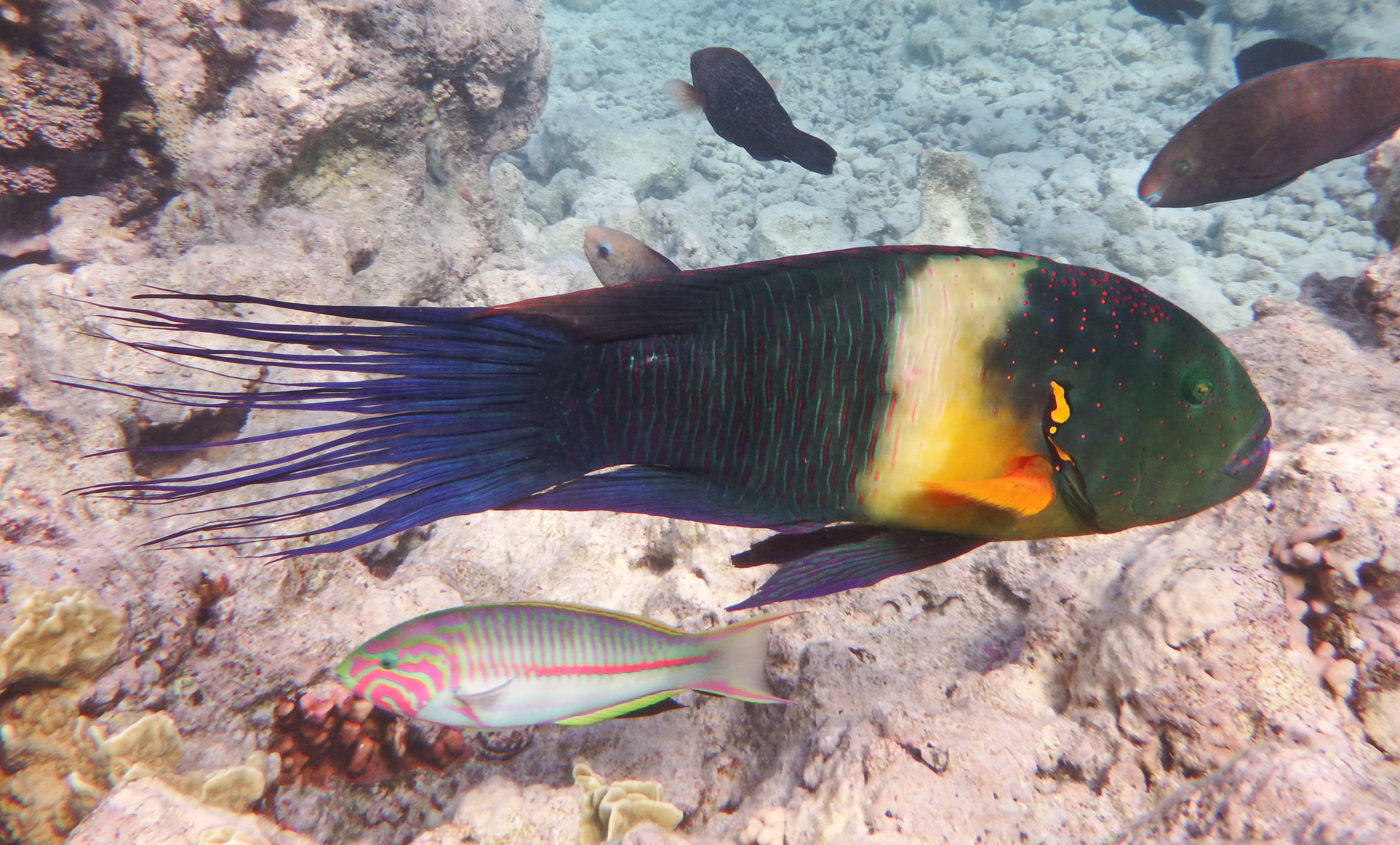
Male

== Distribution and habitat ==
The broomtail wrasse occurs in the Western Indian Ocean where it is found in the Red Sea, off the Horn of Africa, Yemen, Oman and the mouth of the Persian Gulf. In 2022 a single individual was speared in the port of Gaza City in Palestine, representing the first record of this species in the Mediterranean, likeley as a Lessepsian migrant through the Suez Canal. The broomtail wrasse occurs on coral reefs and on adjacent sand and seagrass habitats, at depths of from 2 to 30 m (6 ft 7 in to 98 ft 5 in).

== Habits ==
The broomtail wrasse is a solitary and wary species. The males guard a harem of females and defend a territory. They prey on benthic invertebrates, especially molluscs and crustaceans.
