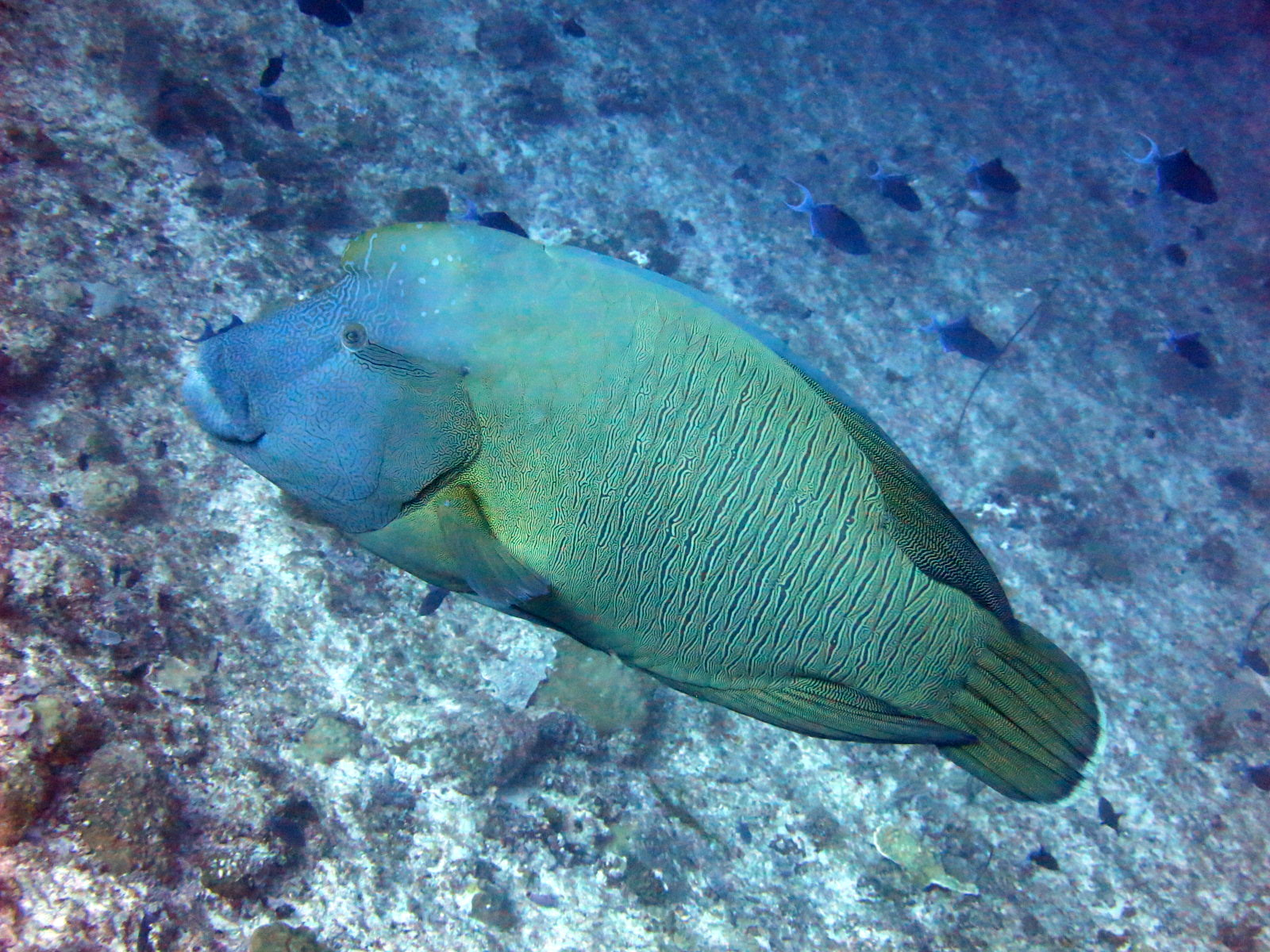
- In the Maldives

Conservation status
- Endangered (IUCN 3.1)
- CITES Appendix II

Scientific classification
- Kingdom: Animalia
- Phylum: Chordata
- Class: Actinopterygii
- Division: Teleostei
- Order: Labriformes
- Family: Labridae
- Subfamily: Cheilininae
- Genus: Crassilabrus; Swainson, 1839
- Species: C. undulatus

Binomial name
- Crassilabrus undulatus (Rüppell, 1835)

Synonyms
- List: Cheilenus undulatus Rüppell, 1835; Cheilinus undulates Rüppell, 1835; Cheilinus undulatus Rüppell, 1835; Chelinus undulatus Rüppell, 1835; Cheilinus mertensii Valenciennes, 1840; Chelinus mertensii Valenciennes, 1840; Cheilinus godeffroyi Günther, 1872; Chelinus godeffroyi Günther, 1872; Chilinus godeffroyi Günther, 1872; Cheilinus rostratus Cartier, 1874; Chelinus rostratus Cartier, 1874

= Humphead wrasse =

Species of fish

The humphead wrasse (Crassilabrus undulatus) is the largest species of wrasse mainly found on coral reefs in the Indo-Pacific region. It is also known as the Māori wrasse, Napoleon wrasse, and Napoleonfish.

The species is one of the top predators of the reef ecosystem, mainly consuming various invertebrate species including the crown-of-thorns starfish. It is of interest to humans for food and for aquaria, along with a growing value in providing ecological services.

== Taxonomy ==
The humphead wrasse has long been placed within the genus Cheilinus, though the advent of genetic analysis revealed it was in fact closer to the slingjaw wrasses of genus Epibulus, being the sister taxon to a clade containing Epibulus and Concholabrus. As a result, it was moved to the resurrected genus Crassilabrus in 2025, as part of a greater taxonomic revision of the wrasse family.

== Description ==
The humphead wrasse is the largest extant member of the family Labridae. Males, typically larger than females, are capable of reaching up to 229 centimetres (90 in) and weighing up to 191 kilograms (421 lb), but the average length tends to be around 60 centimetres (24 in). Females rarely grow larger than one meter. This species can be easily identified by its large size, thick lips, two black lines behind its eyes, and the hump on the foreheads of larger adults. Its color can vary between olive to more vibrant shades of green and purplish-blue, with a pattern of yellow undulating lines or reticulation on the head.

Adults are usually observed living singly, but are also seen in male–female pairs and in small groups.

The mitogenome of this wrasse was sequenced in 2013. Since so little was known about the wrasse's genetic relationships at a geographical scale, researchers utilized a test using microsatellite loci to facilitate population genetic studies. (DNA markers could not be used for testing, as the humphead wrasse lack such markers.) Of the 15 microsatellite loci used in the test, only four seemed to have different outcomes than the other 11. These loci were all prone to null alleles. However, with the presence of these null alleles, the results may have been slightly biased, or they may be related to a particularity of the C. undulatus, which are highly restricted to coral reef habitats.

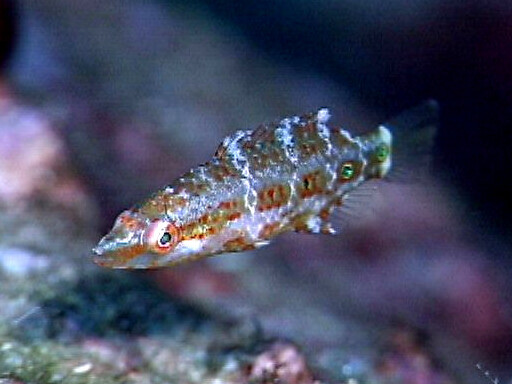
Young juvenile

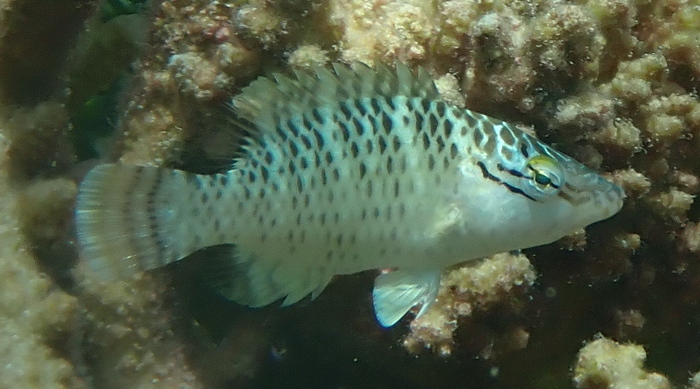
Older juvenile

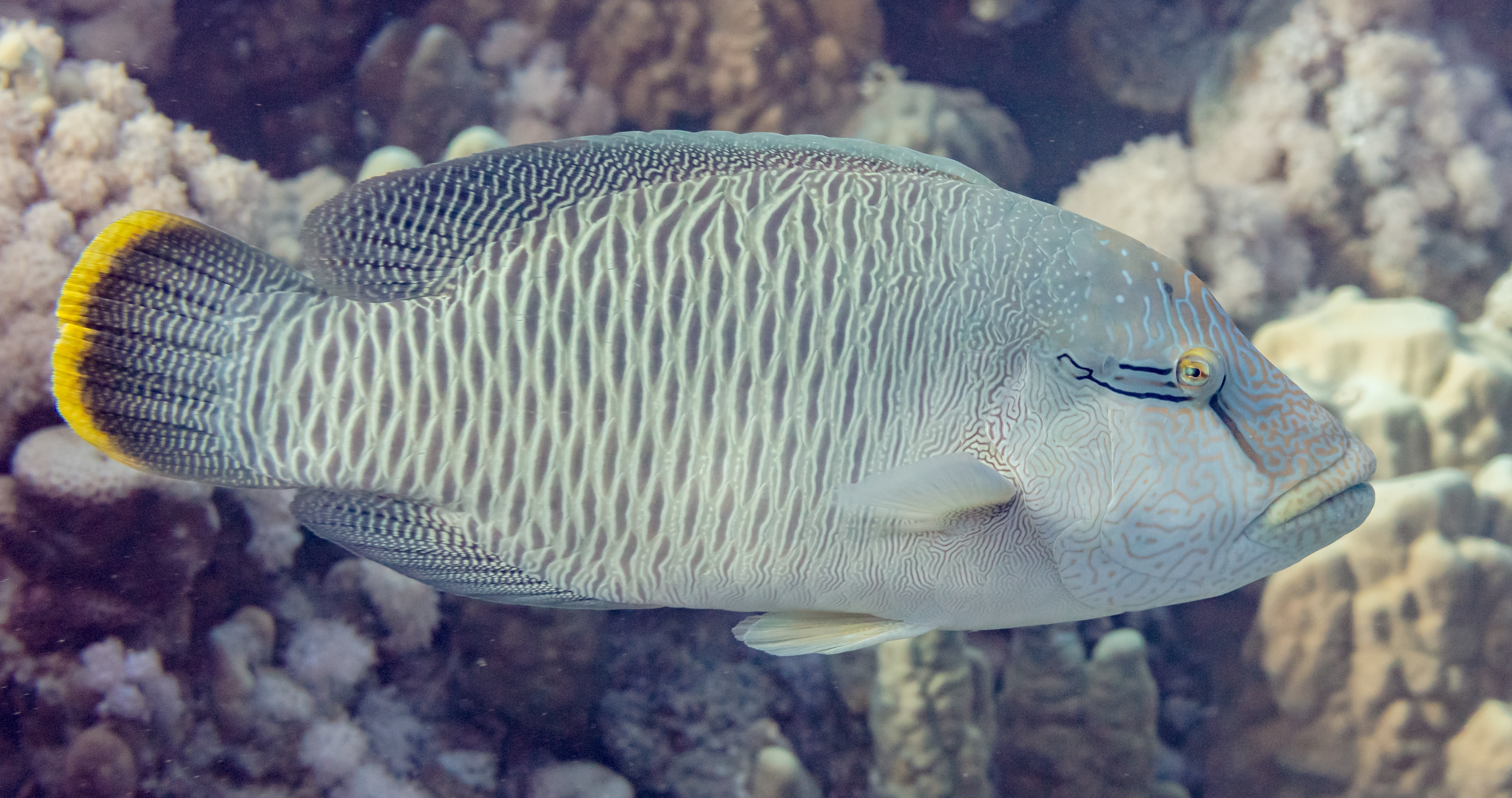
Female

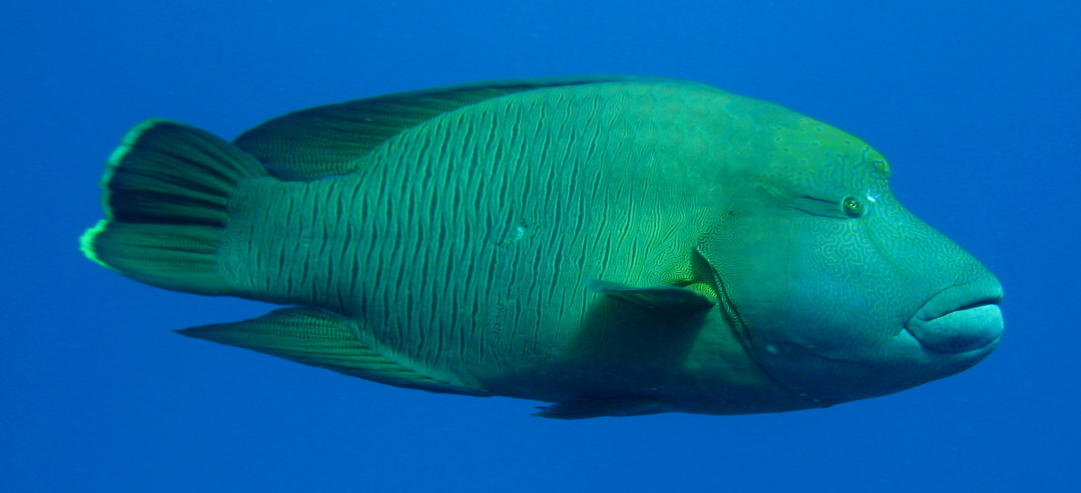
Male

== Habitat ==
The humphead wrasses can be found on the east coast of Africa around the mouth of the Red Sea, and in some areas of the Indian and Pacific Oceans. Juveniles are usually found in shallow, sandy ranges bordering coral reef waters, while adults are found mostly in offshore and deeper areas of coral reefs, typically in outer-reef slopes and channels, but also in lagoons.

== Biology ==
Adults are commonly found on steep coral reef slopes, channel slopes, and lagoon reefs in water 2 to 60 m (6 ft 7 in to 196 ft 10 in) deep.

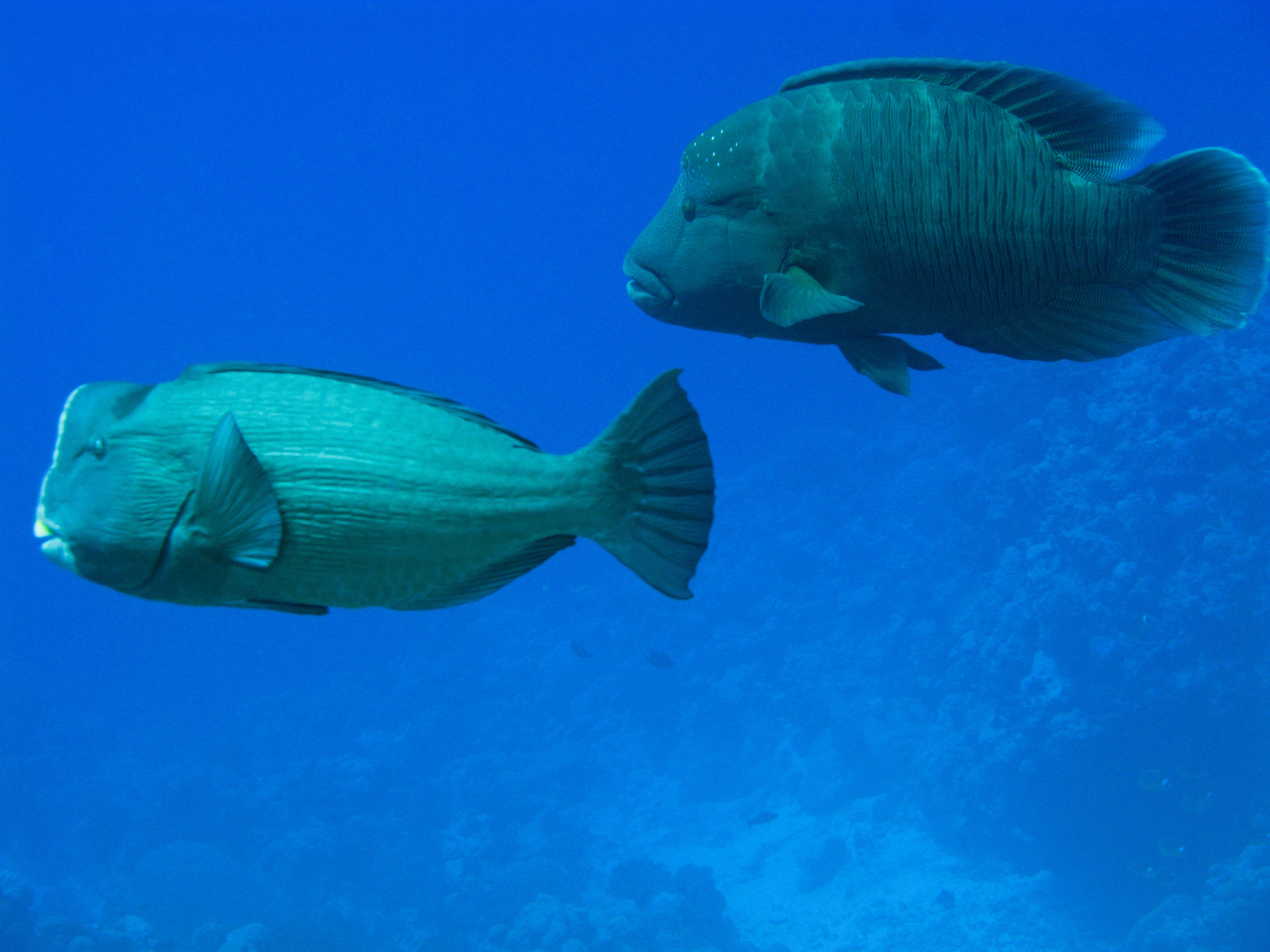
Humphead wrasse (right) compared to a humphead parrotfish (left), at Wake Island.

Very opportunistic predators, C. undulatus preys primarily on invertebrates such as mollusks (particularly gastropods, as well as bivalves), sea urchins, crustaceans, annelids, as well as other fish, and even toxic species such as sea hares, boxfish, and crown-of-thorns starfish. Because many bivalves and sea urchins hide under the sand, wrasses may rely on fish excavators like stingrays, or they may excavate these animals themselves by ejecting water to displace sand and nosing around for prey. Like many other Red Sea wrasses, humphead wrasses often crack sea urchins by carrying them to a rock in their mouths and striking them against the rock with brisk, sideways head movements.

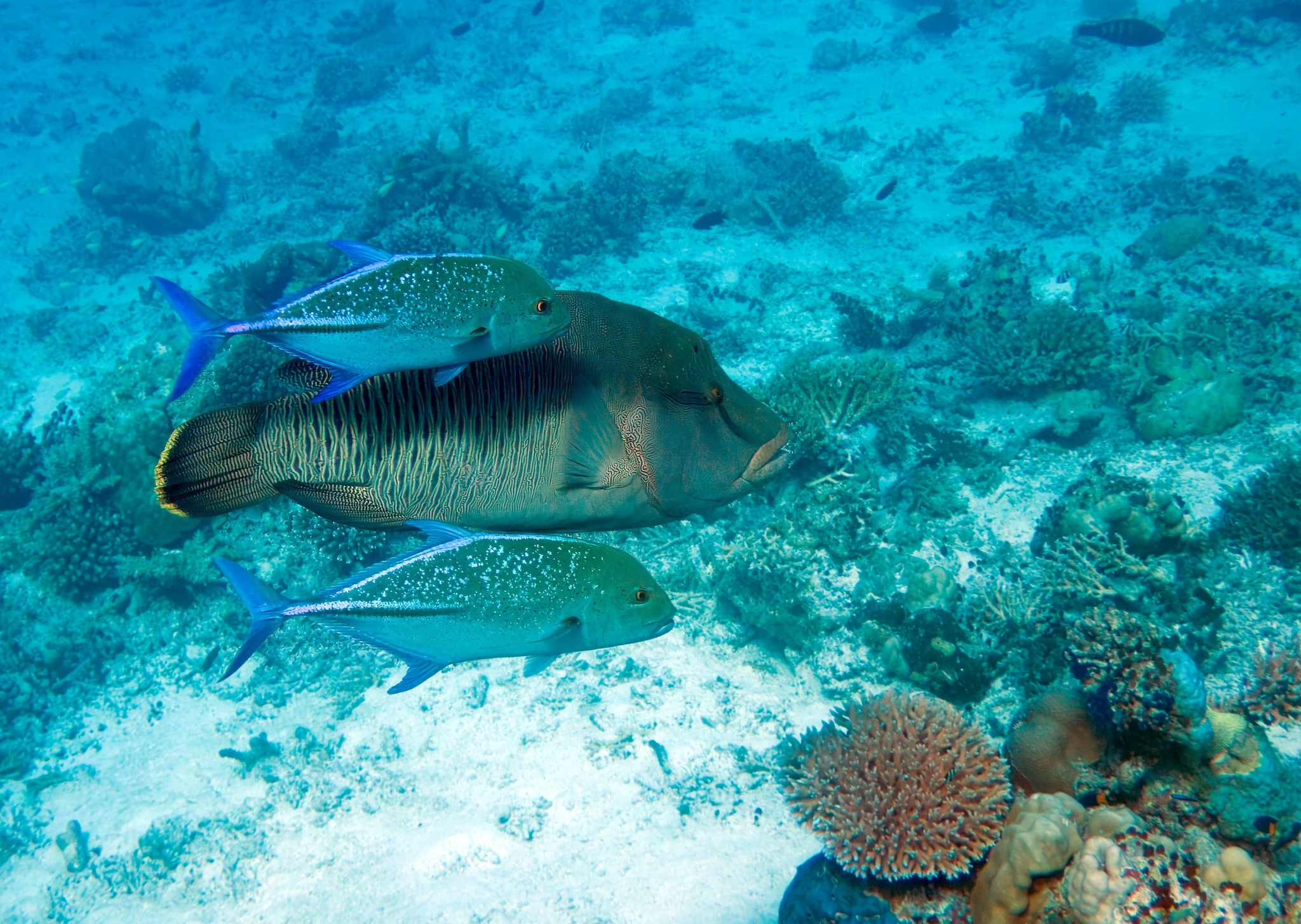
With bluefin trevally, in the Maldives

They sometimes engage in cooperative hunting with the roving coral grouper.

The species actively selects branching hard and soft corals (one species being Acropora) and seagrasses at settlement. Juveniles tend to prefer a more cryptic existence in areas of dense branching corals, bushy macroalgae, or seagrasses, while larger individuals and adults prefer limited home ranges in more open habitat on the edges of reefs, channels, and reef passes. The humphead wrasse is considered an umbrella species, which means many other species are sympatric with it and have much smaller ranges, making the conservation of the humphead wrasse's habitat benefit these other species as well.

=== Reproduction ===
The humphead wrasse is long-lived, but has a very slow breeding rate. Individuals become sexually mature at five to seven years, and are known to live for around 30 years. They are protogynous hermaphrodites, with some becoming male at about 9 years old. The factors controlling the timing of sex change are not yet known. At certain times of year, adults move to the down-current end of the reef and form local spawning aggregations (groups). They likely do not travel very far for their spawning aggregations.

The pelagic eggs and larvae ultimately settle on or near coral reef habitats. Eggs are 0.65 mm in diameter and spherical, with no pigment.

== Relation to humans ==
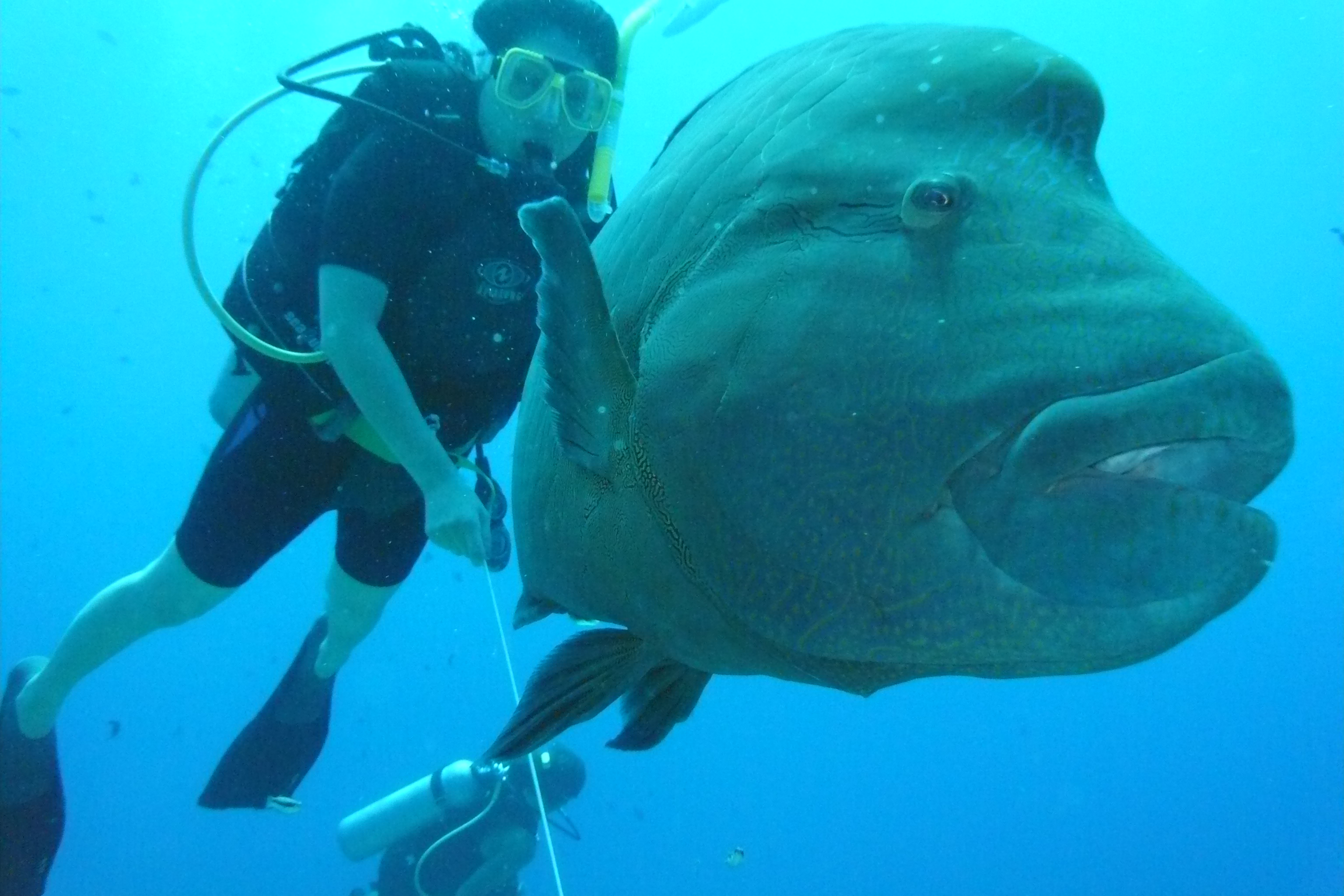
With a diver, in Palau

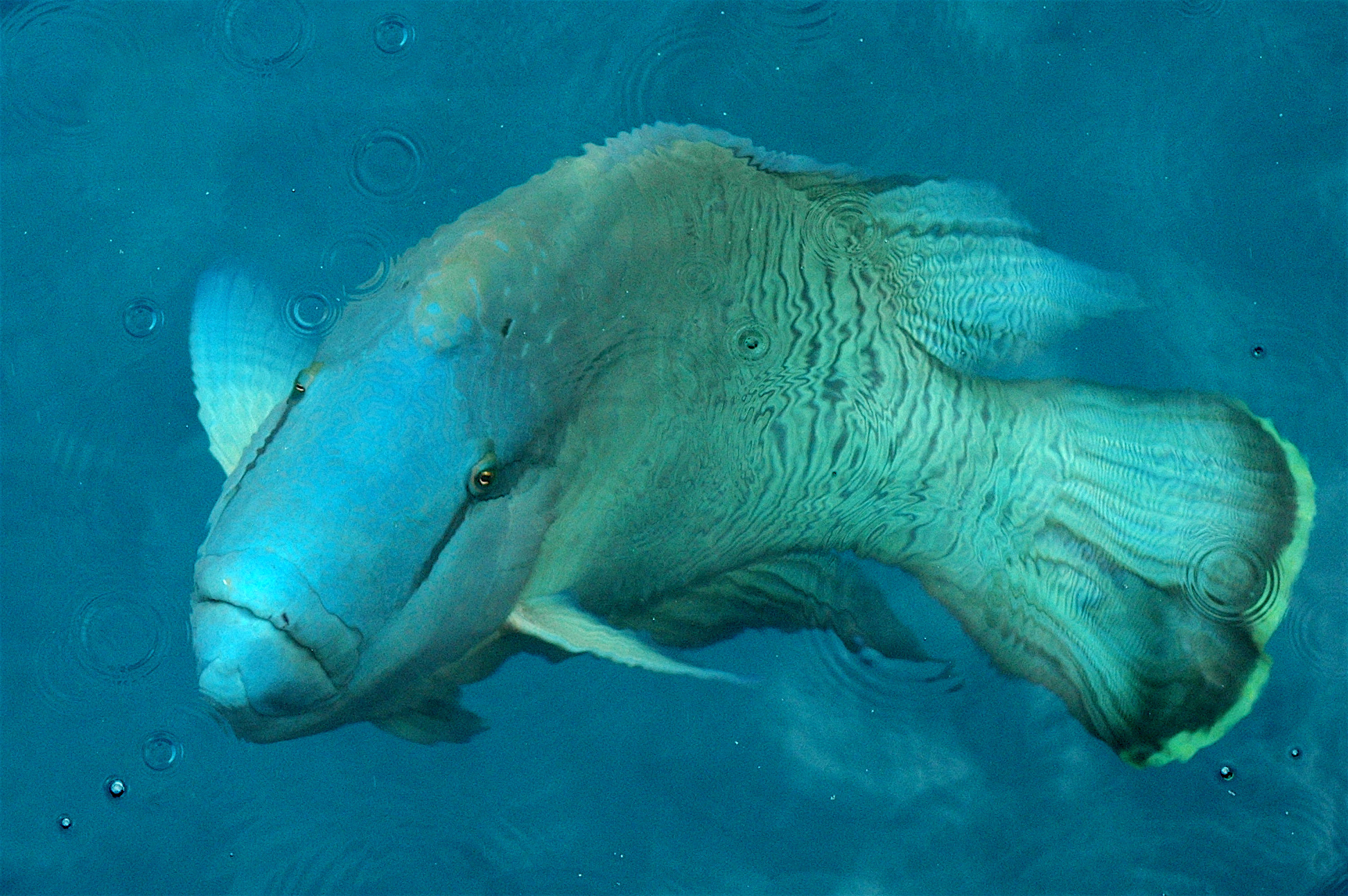
At the water's surface, on the Great Barrier Reef

The Philippines, Indonesia, and Malaysia are the three largest exporters of the humphead wrasse. It has one of the highest retail values in Asia, especially when caught alive, and it is considered a delicacy in places like Malaysia. Illegal, unregulated, and unreported activities have been identified as the major factor for the failure of conservation efforts. Although the Convention on International Trade in Endangered Species of Wild Fauna and Flora has banned its export, the fish are still smuggled across the Malaysia–Philippines border.

Four main factors have allowed illegal, unregulated and unreported activities to persist:

1. Lack of capacity – A lack exists of formal procedures and personnel to monitor fishing activities and enforce fishing regulations
2. Lack of disincentives – Fishers do not have alternatives for the humphead wrasse, due to its value, and sanctions for illegal fishing are not harsh enough to discourage them
3. Weak accountability systems – Because a number of people are involved in the species' trade, it is difficult to trace its source; and importers and consumers cannot be held responsible for illegal exportation.
4. Absent domestic trade controls – Domestic catching, possession, and trade are not sufficiently restricted. Fishers may illegally source the fish or intend to illegally trade it, but cannot be prosecuted if they are in Malaysian waters with appropriate permits.

Most exports of the humphead wrasse in Malaysia occur in the Bornean state of Sabah (in Sandakan, Papar, and Tawau), where the fish could recently be purchased for between US$45.30 and $69.43, with its retail price ranging from $60.38 to $120.36.

=== Conservation ===
The humphead wrasse is listed as endangered on the IUCN Red list and in Appendix II of CITES. Its numbers have declined due to multiple threats, including:

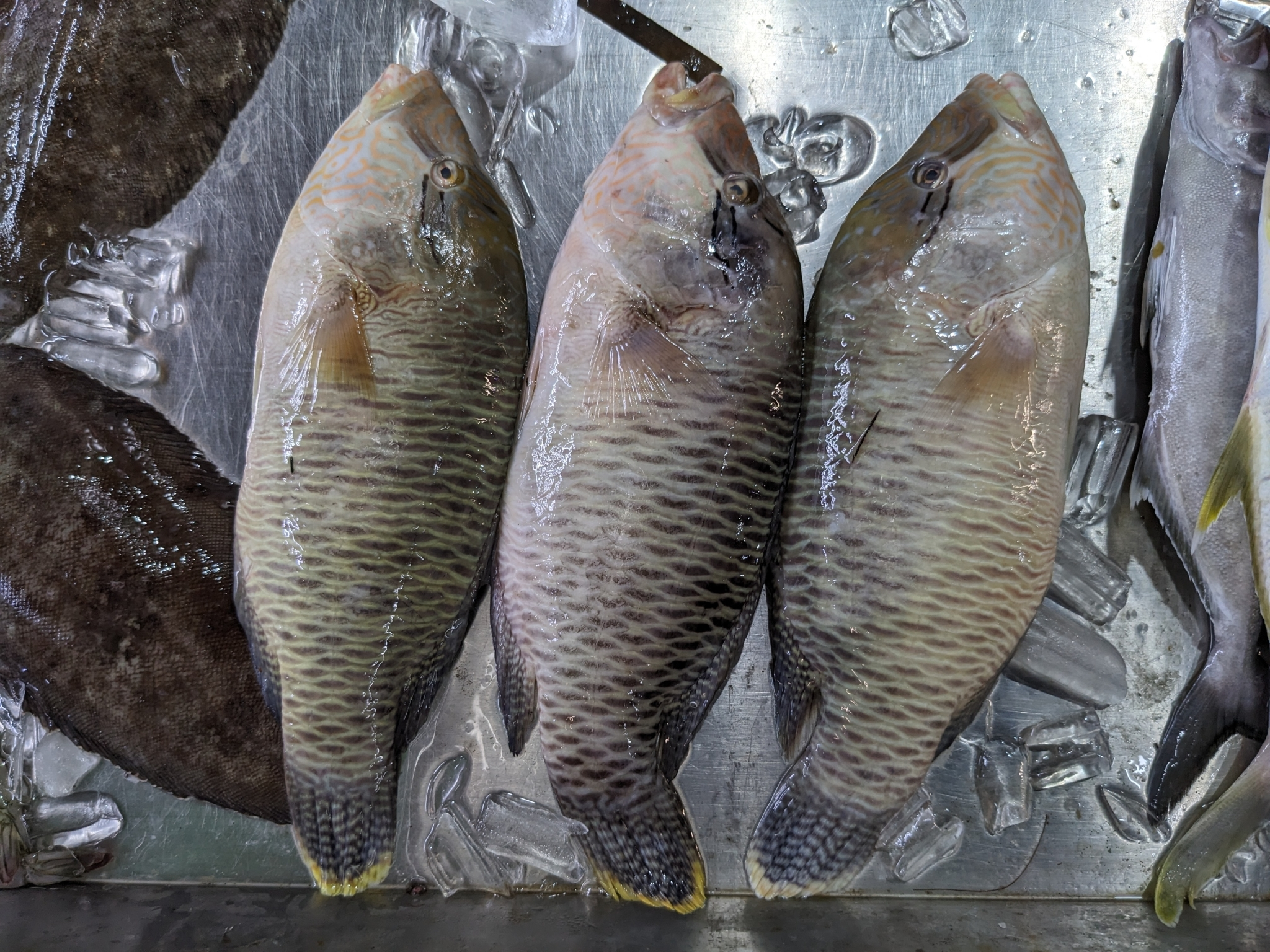
Being sold as food

1. Intensive, species-specific removal by the live reef food-fish trade throughout its core range in Southeast Asia
2. Destructive fishing techniques, including bombs and cyanide
3. Habitat loss and degradation
4. Local consumption, and its perception as a delicacy to locals and tourists
5. A developing export market for juveniles for the marine aquarium trade
6. Lack of coordinated, consistent national and regional management
7. Inadequate knowledge of the species
8. Illegal, unreported and unregulated fishing

Unsustainable and severe overfishing within the live reef food fish trade is the primary threat. Sabah, on Borneo Island, is a major source of humphead wrasses. The fishing industry is vital to this state because of its severe poverty. The export of humphead wrasses out of Sabah has led to a roughly 99% decline in the area's population. In an effort to protect it, export of the humphead wrasse out of Sabah has been banned; however, it has not prevented illegal, unreported and unregulated activities. Protection by the Convention on International Trade in Endangered Species of Wild Fauna and Flora (CITES) is managed in this area by the federal Department of Fisheries Malaysia, which issues permits to regulate fishing activity. Two pieces of legislation have also been implemented to protect the species: The Fisheries Act 1985 controls the transport of live fish and prohibits destructive fishing techniques; and the International Trade in Endangered Species Act 2008 supports Malaysia's adoption of CITES.

The humphead wrasse has historically been fished commercially in northern Australia, but has been protected in Queensland since 2003 and in Western Australia since 1998.

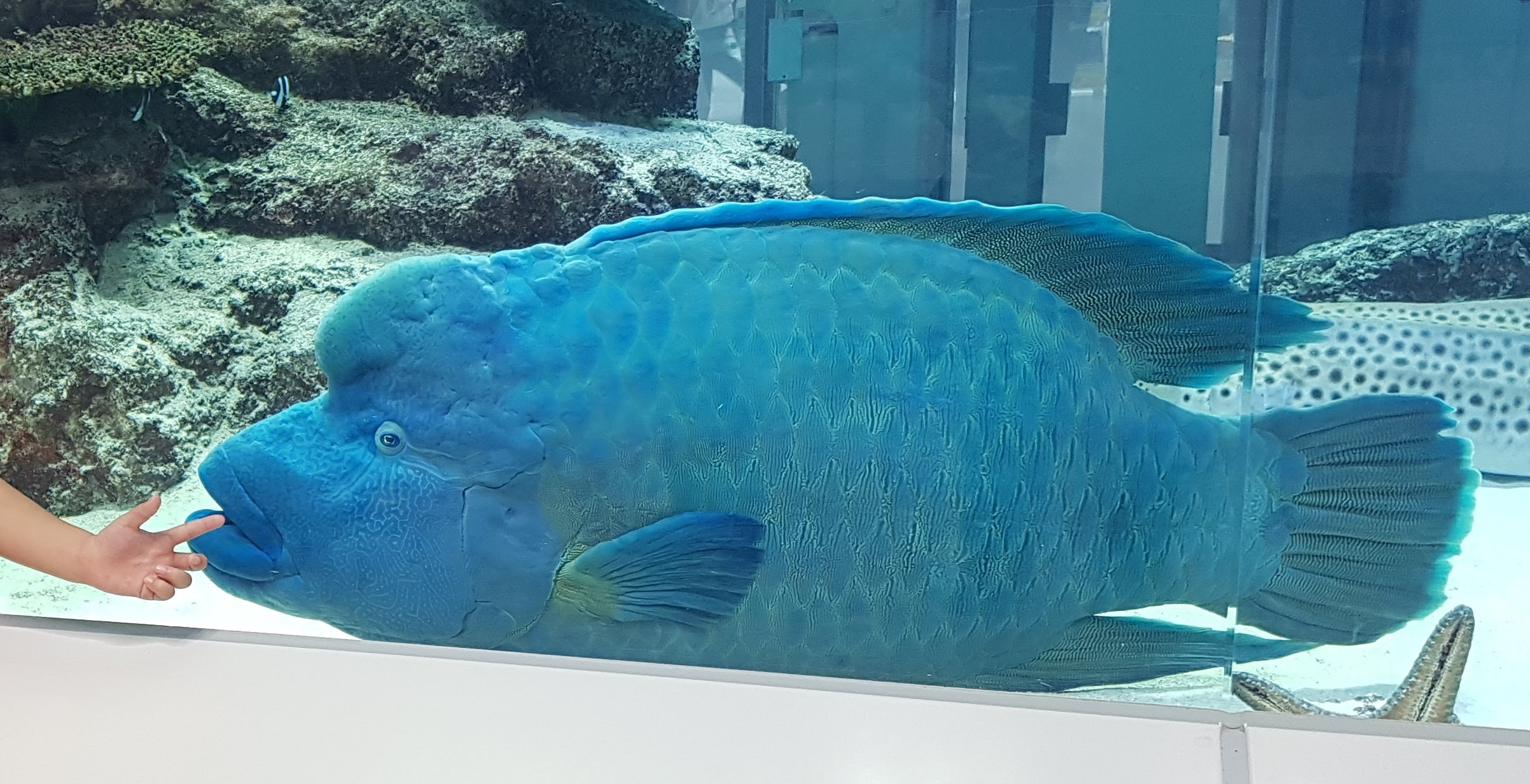
In an aquarium at Aeon mall, Okinawa

In Guangdong Province, southern mainland China, permits are required for the sale of the species. Indonesia allows fishing only for research, mariculture and licensed artisanal fishing. The Maldives instituted an export ban in 1995; Papua New Guinea prohibits export of fish over 2 ft (61 cm); and Niue has banned all fishing for this species.

The U.S. National Marine Fisheries Service has classified the humphead wrasse as a species of concern—one about which it has concerns, but for which it has insufficient information to list under the Endangered Species Act.

In Taiwan it is a protected species with fines of between NT$300,000 and $1.5 million and jail sentences of between 6 months and 5 years under the Wildlife Conservation act for hunting or killing of the species having been added to the protection list in 2014.

== See also ==
- Green humphead parrotfish (Bolbometopon muricatum)
- List of animals with humps
