= Snooty (disambiguation) =

Snooty was a manatee born and held in captivity in Florida (1948–2017).

Snooty may also refer to:

- Lord Snooty, a character in the British comic The Beano
- Snooty wrasse, species of fish

== See also ==
- Snootie Wild (1985–2022), American rapper and singer
