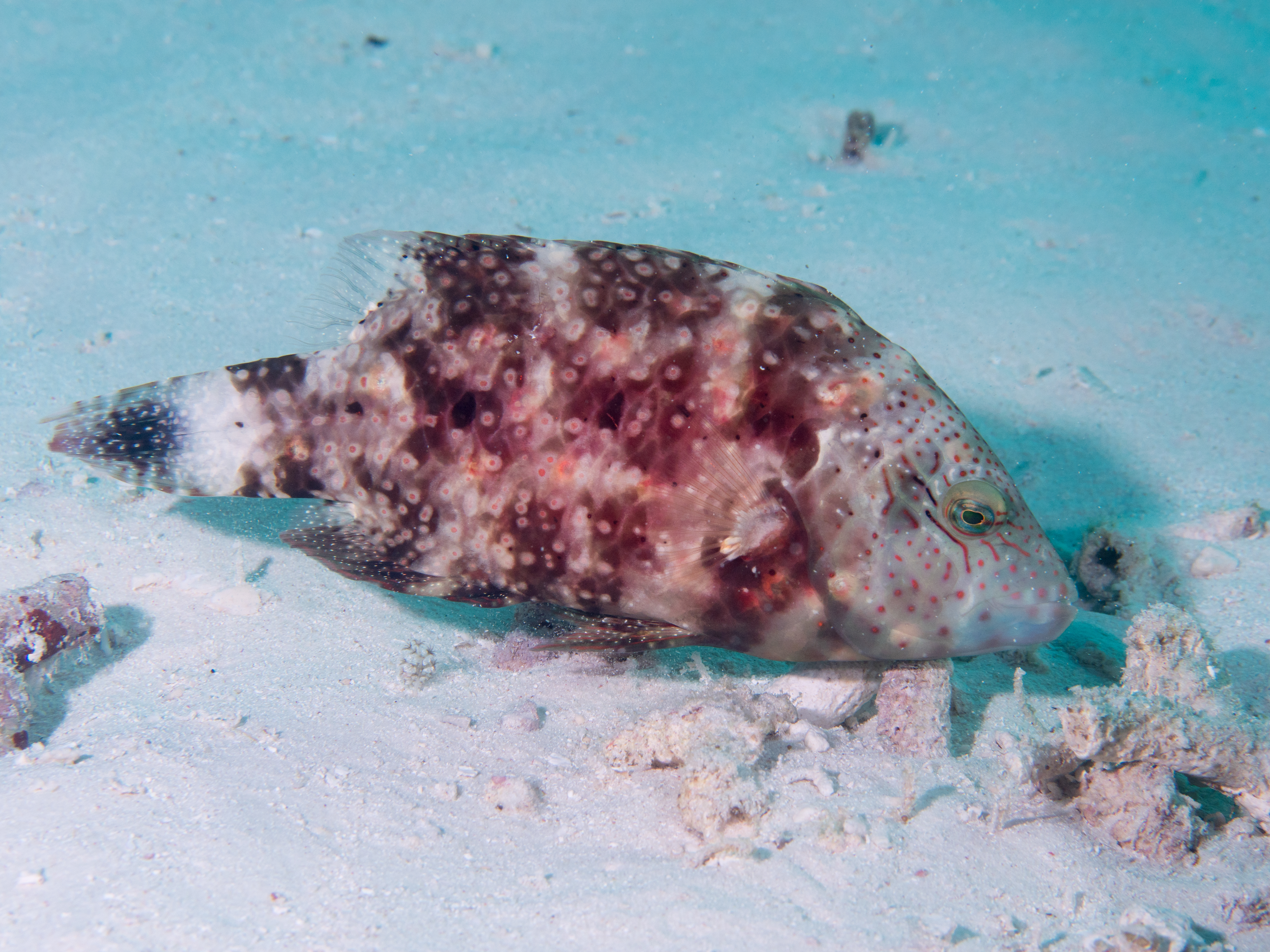

Conservation status
- Least Concern (IUCN 3.1)

Scientific classification
- Kingdom: Animalia
- Phylum: Chordata
- Class: Actinopterygii
- Order: Labriformes
- Family: Labridae
- Genus: Cheilinus
- Species: C. chlorourus

Binomial name
- Cheilinus chlorourus (Bloch, 1791)

Synonyms
- Sparus chlorourus Bloch, 1791; Cheilinus punctatus E. T. Bennett, 1832; Crenilabrus blochii Swainson, 1839; Cheilinus blochii Valenciennes, 1840; Cheilinus punctulatus Valenciennes, 1840; Cheilinus guttatus Bleeker, 1847; Cheilinus decacanthus Bleeker, 1851

= Floral wrasse =

Species of fish

The floral wrasse (Cheilinus chlorourus) is a species of wrasse native to the Indian Ocean and the western Pacific Ocean from the coast of Africa to the Tuamotus and Marquesas. Its range extends as far north as the Ryukyus and south to New Caledonia. It is an inhabitant of reefs in lagoons or coastal waters at depths of from 1 to 30 m (3.3 to 98.4 ft). This species can reach 45 cm (18 in) in total length. It is of minor importance to local commercial fisheries and can also be found in the aquarium trade.

== Description ==
It has a mottled body with sand colored spots. It is about 13in.

== Habitat ==
The Floral wrasse lives in reefs in lagoon and coastal water at depth of 1–30 meters.

== Distribution ==
The Floral wrasse lives from the West Indian Ocean to the central/west Pacific Ocean.

== Diet ==
It mostly eats crustaceans, other invertebrates, and fish.
