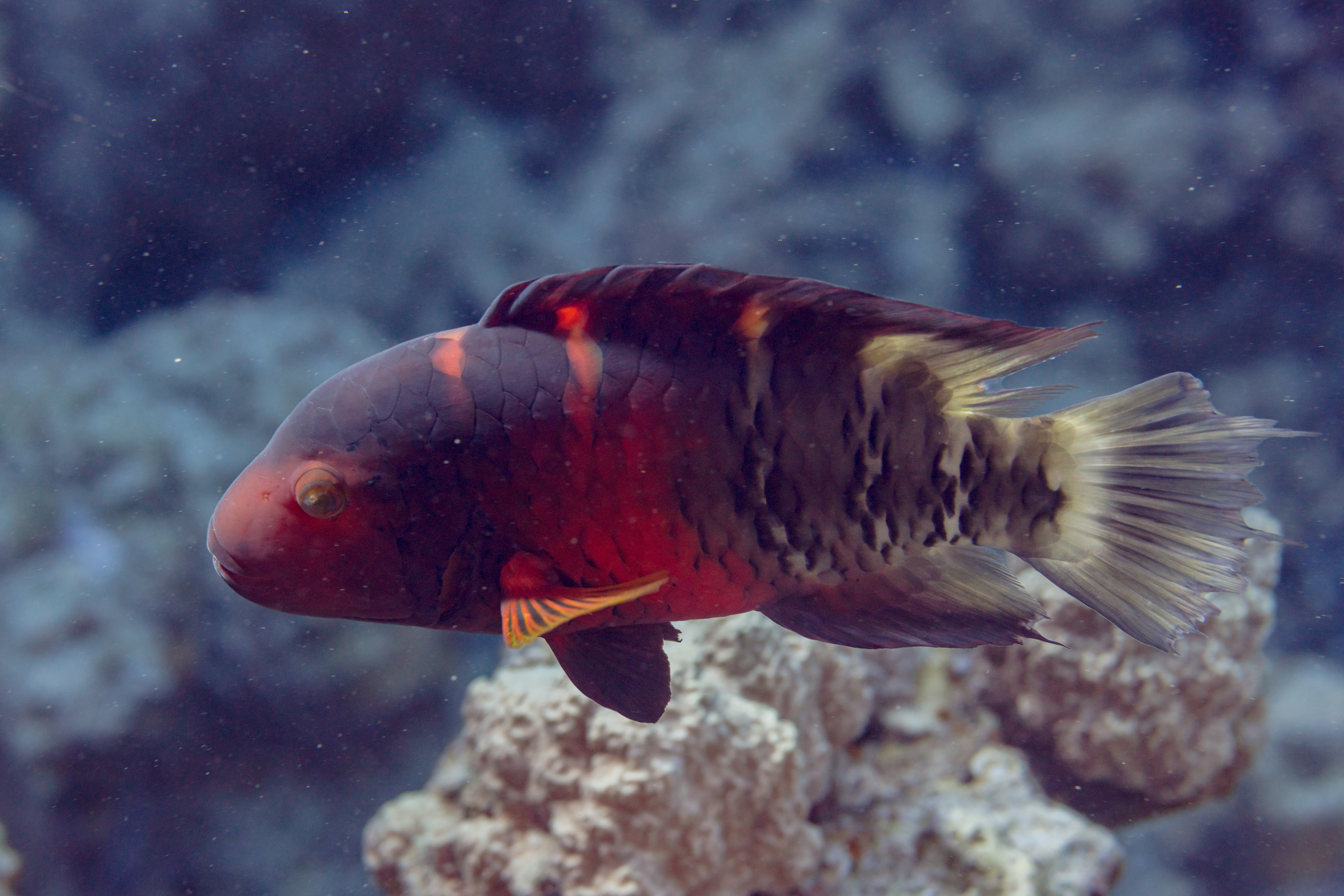
- Cheilinus quinquecinctus

Scientific classification
- Kingdom: Animalia
- Phylum: Chordata
- Class: Actinopterygii
- Order: Labriformes
- Family: Labridae
- Subfamily: Cheilininae
- Genus: Cheilinus; Lacépède, 1801

Type species
- Cheilinus trilobatus Lacépède, 1801

= Cheilinus =

Cheilinus Temporal range: 87–0 Ma Late Cretaceous to Present

Genus of fishes

Cheilinus is a genus of fish in the family Labridae native to the Indian and Pacific Ocean.

== Species ==
There are currently eight recognized species in this genus:

Species	Common name	Image
Cheilinus abudjubbe Rüppell, 1835	Abdujubbes wrasse	
Cheilinus chlorourus (Bloch, 1791)	Floral wrasse	
Cheilinus fasciatus (Bloch, 1791)	Red-breasted wrasse	
Cheilinus lunulatus (Forsskål, 1775)	Broom-tail wrasse	
Cheilinus oxycephalus Bleeker, 1853	Snooty wrasse	
Cheilinus quinquecinctus Rüppell, 1835	White-barred wrasse, Red Sea red-breasted wrasse	
Cheilinus trilobatus Lacépède, 1801	Triple-tail wrasse	
Cheilinus undulatus Rüppell, 1835	Hump-head wrasse	
