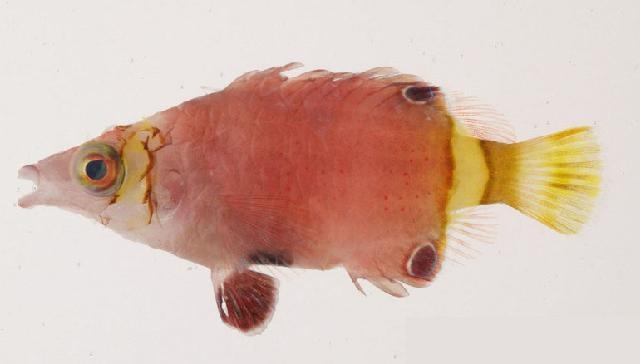
- Wetmorella nigropinnata (Seale, 1901)

Conservation status
- Least Concern (IUCN 3.1)

Scientific classification
- Kingdom: Animalia
- Phylum: Chordata
- Class: Actinopterygii
- Order: Labriformes
- Family: Labridae
- Genus: Wetmorella
- Species: W. nigropinnata

Binomial name
- Wetmorella nigropinnata (Seale, 1901)

Synonyms
- Cheilinus nigropinnatus Seale, 1901; Wetmorella philippina Fowler & Bean, 1928; Wetmorella ocellata Schultz & Marshall, 1954; Wetmorella triocellata Schultz & Marshall, 1954

= Wetmorella nigropinnata =

Species of fish

The sharpnose wrasse or possum wrasse (Wetmorella nigropinnata) is a species of wrasse native to the Indo-Pacific region, from the Red Sea across to Pitcairn Island. They live in coral reefs. They were a minor importance for commercial fisheries and it could be found in the aquarium trade.
