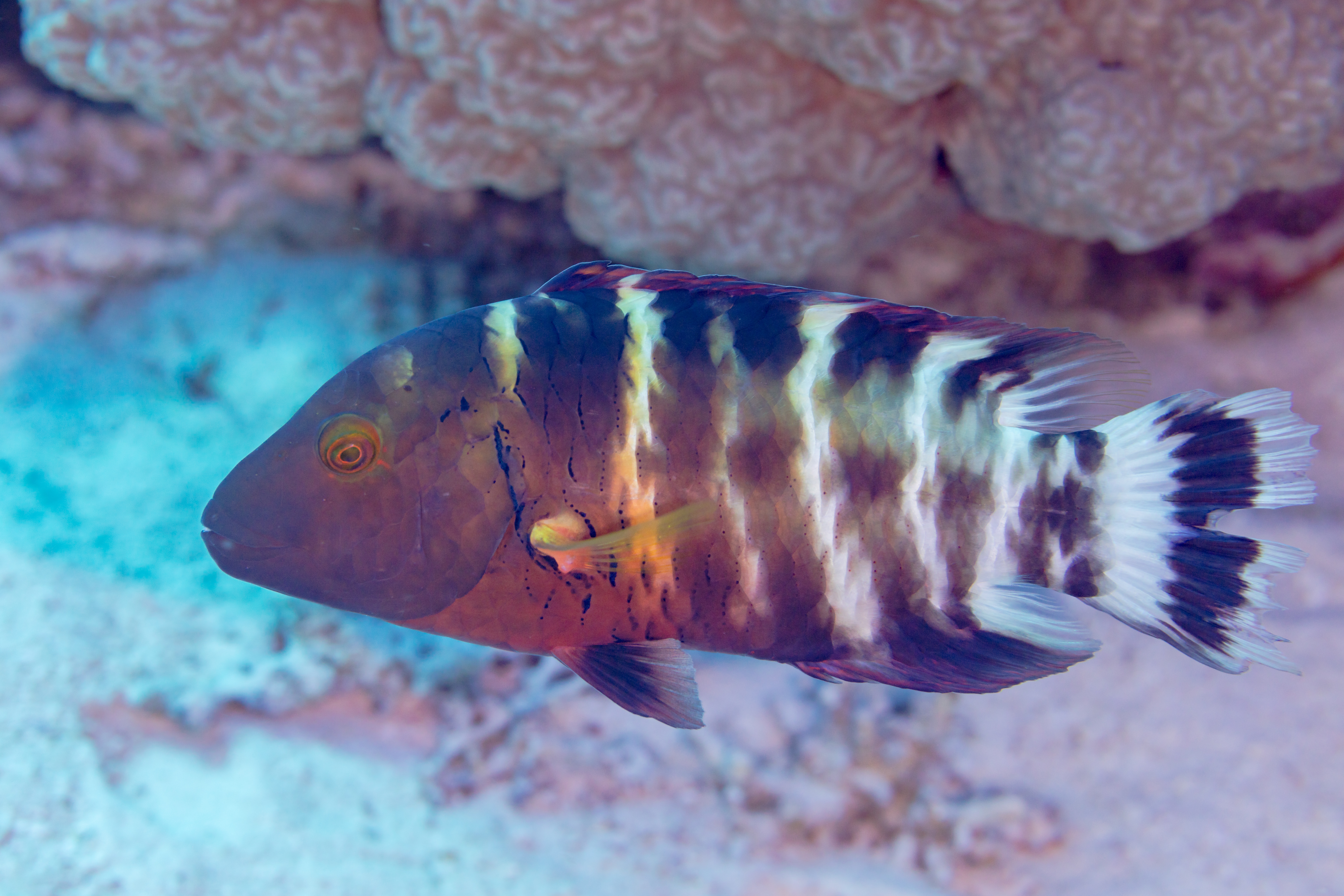
- Off the coast of Egypt

Scientific classification
- Kingdom: Animalia
- Phylum: Chordata
- Class: Actinopterygii
- Order: Labriformes
- Family: Labridae
- Genus: Concholabrus
- Species: C. quinquecinctus

Binomial name
- Concholabrus quinquecinctus (Rüppell, 1835)

Synonyms
- Cheilinus quinquecinctus Rüppell, 1835

= Cheilinus quinquecinctus =

Species of fish in the Red and Arabian Seas

Concholabrus quinquecinctus, the white-barred wrasse, is a species of wrasse in the genus Concholabrus.

== Taxonomy ==
The white-barred wrasse has long been placed within the genus Cheilinus, though the advent of genetic analysis revealed it was in fact closer to the slingjaw wrasses of genus Epibulus, being their sister taxon. As a result, it was moved to the newly erected genus Concholabrus in 2025, as part of a greater taxonomic revision of the wrasse family.

== Description ==
Its body and tail has thick black stripes separated by thin white bars. A large orange/red patch centered on the pelvic base but not on the pelvic fins.

== Distribution ==
Conchlabrus quinquecinctus live in Red Sea. It borders, but does likely not overlap with, the geographic range of its sister species Concholabrus fasciatus.

== Habitat and diet ==
The species lives in coral and rocky reefs. It feeds on benthic invertebrates.

== Gallery ==
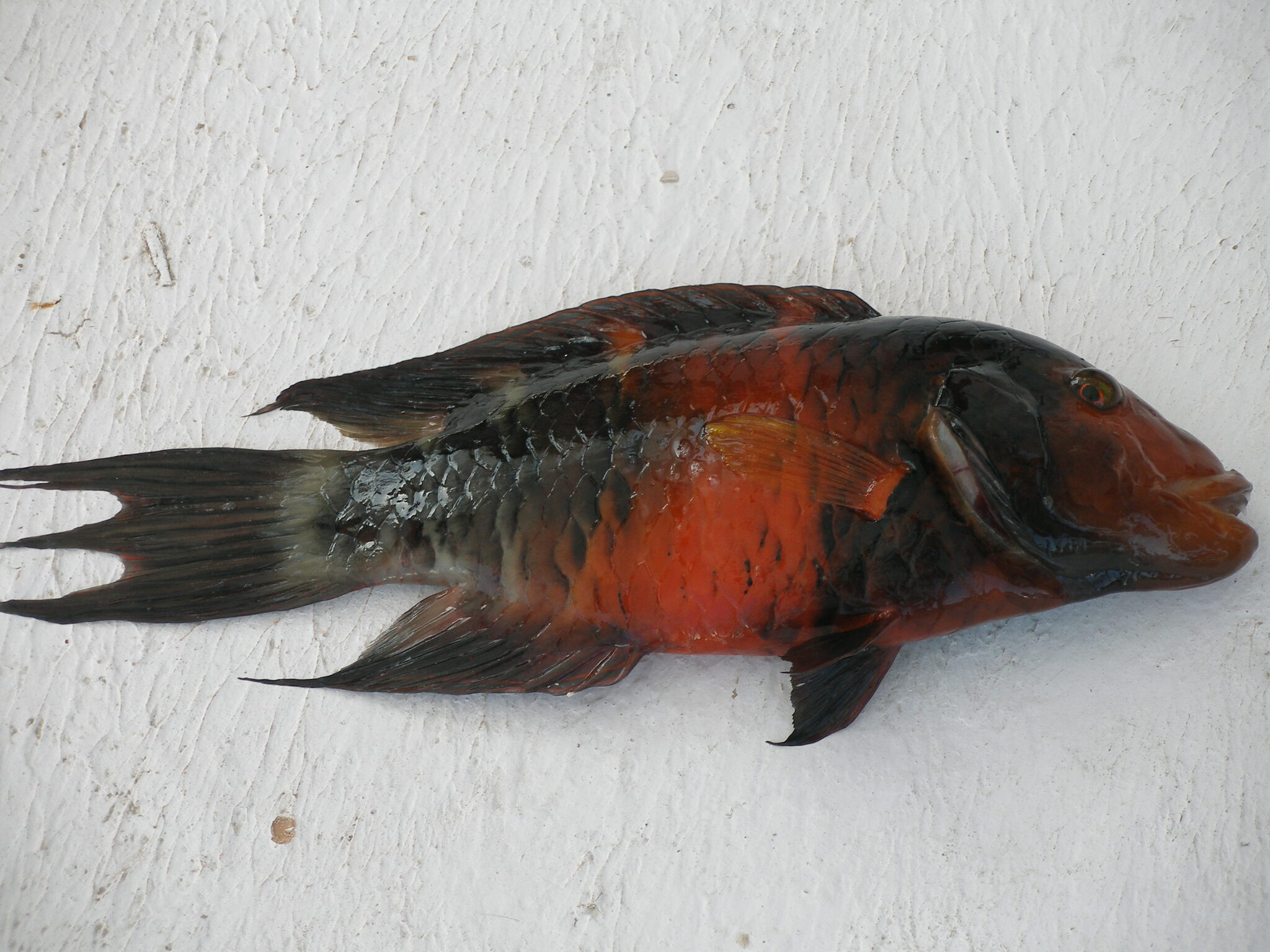

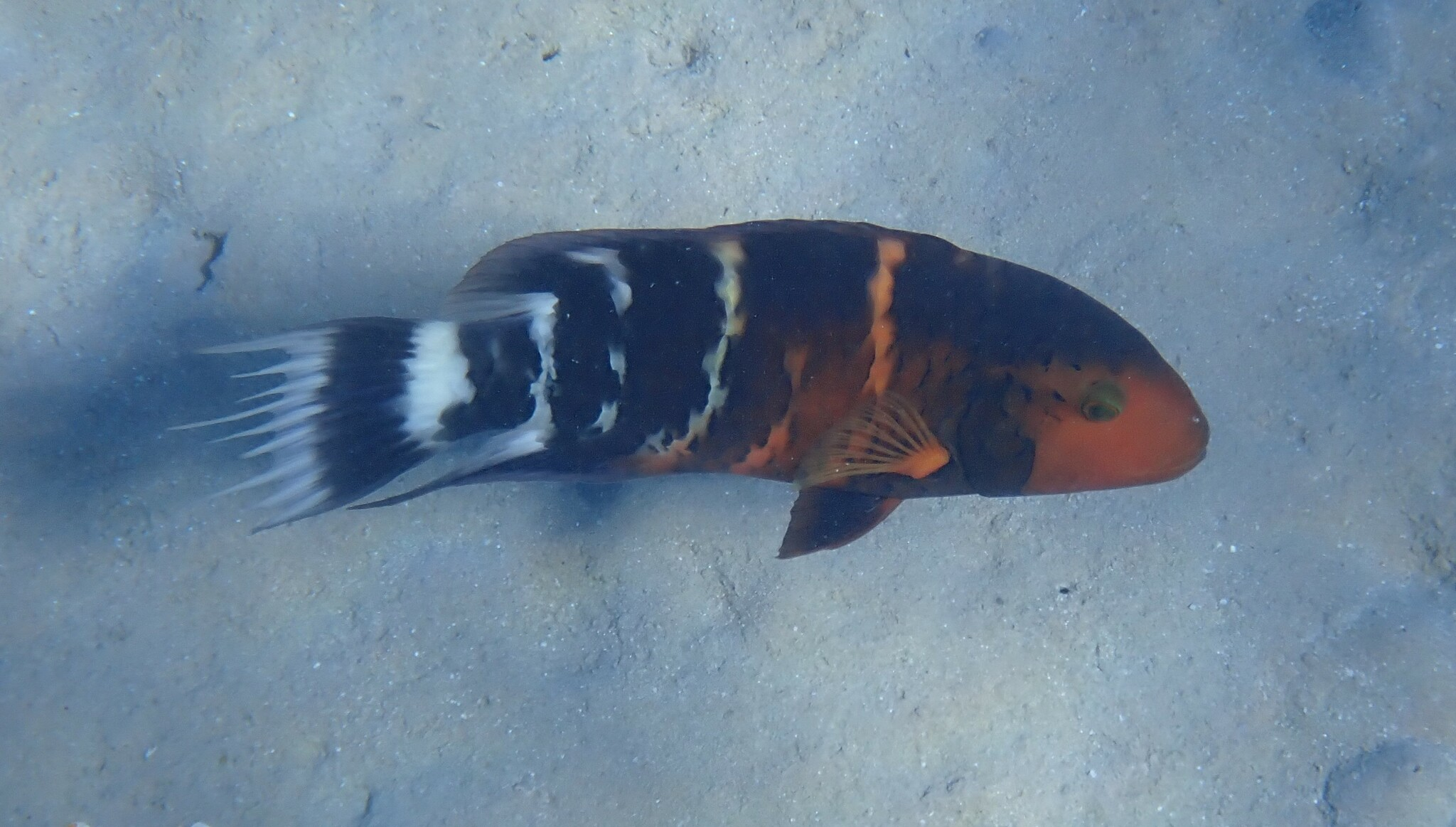

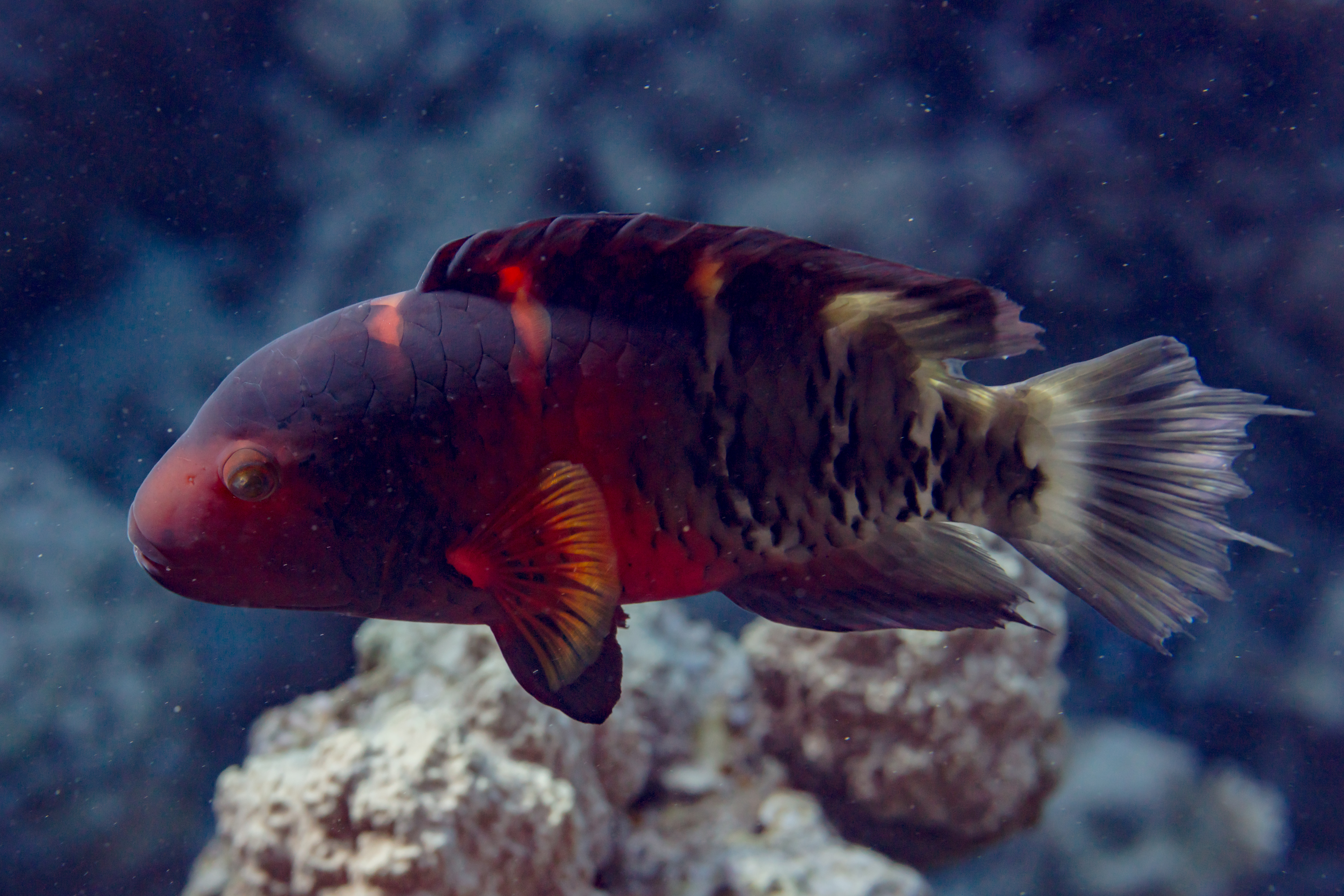
