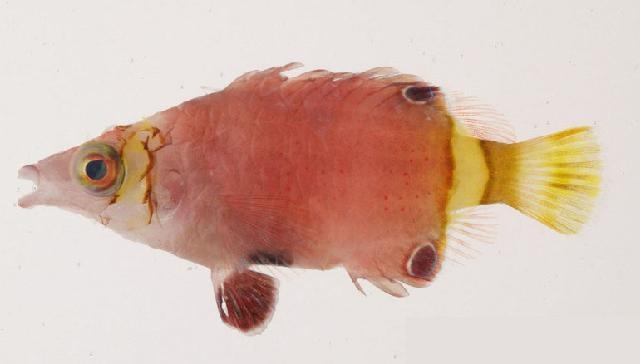
- W. nigropinnata
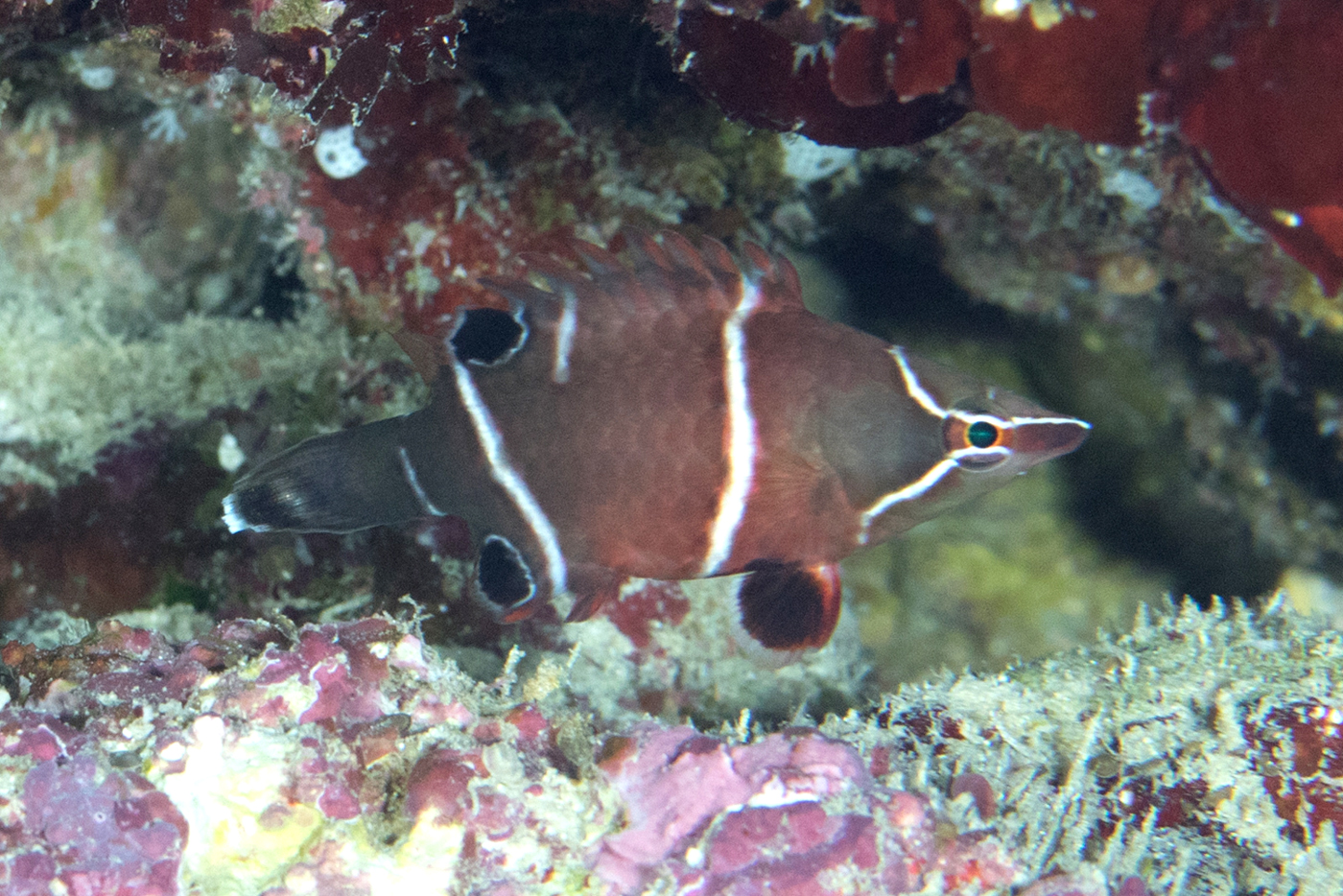
- W. albofasciata

Scientific classification
- Domain: Eukaryota
- Kingdom: Animalia
- Phylum: Chordata
- Class: Actinopterygii
- Order: Labriformes
- Family: Labridae
- Tribe: Cheilinini
- Genus: Wetmorella; Fowler & B. A. Bean, 1928

Type species
- Wetmorella philippina Fowler & B. A. Bean, 1928

= Wetmorella =

Genus of fishes

Wetmorella is a genus of wrasses native to the Indian and Pacific Oceans.

== Species ==
The currently recognized species in this genus are:

- Wetmorella albofasciata L. P. Schultz & N. B. Marshall, 1954 (white-banded sharpnose wrasse)
- Wetmorella nigropinnata (Seale, 1901) (sharpnose wrasse)
- Wetmorella tanakai J. E. Randall & Kuiter, 2007 (Tanaka's wrasse)
