= Robin redbreast =

Robin redbreast may refer to:

- American robin, Turdus migratories, in the Turdidae (true thrush) family
- Flame robin, Petroica phoenicea
- Red-capped robin, Petroica goodenovii
- Scarlet robin, Petroica multicolor
- European robin, Erithacus rubecula, a small passerine bird in the Muscicapidae (Old World flycatchers) family
- Robin Redbreast (Play for Today), a 1970 BBC Play for Today

== See also ==
- Little Robin Redbreast, an English language nursery rhyme
