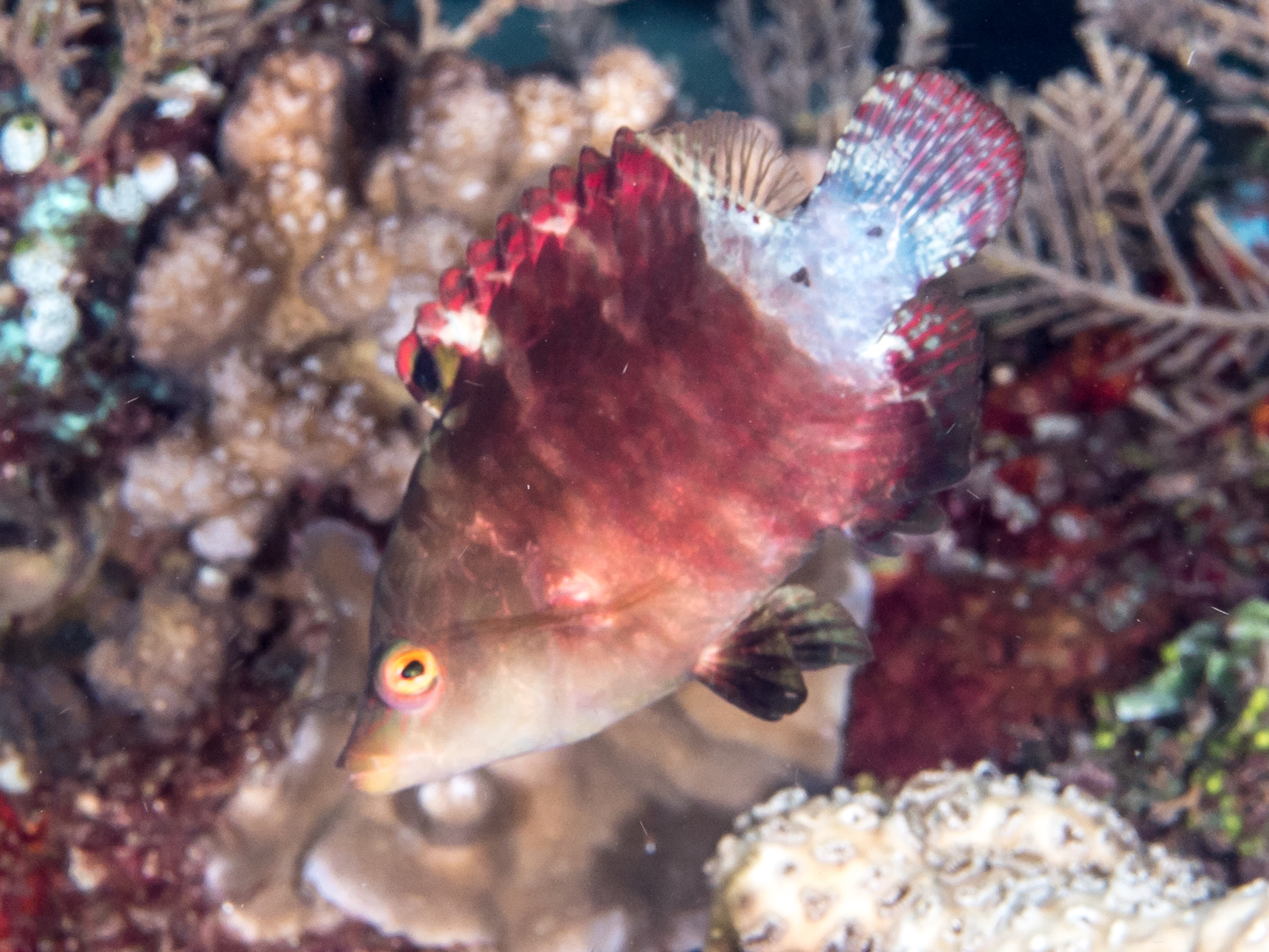

Conservation status
- Least Concern (IUCN 3.1)

Scientific classification
- Kingdom: Animalia
- Phylum: Chordata
- Class: Actinopterygii
- Order: Labriformes
- Family: Labridae
- Genus: Cheilinus
- Species: C. oxycephalus

Binomial name
- Cheilinus oxycephalus Bleeker, 1853

Synonyms
- Cheilinus sanguineus Valenciennes, 1840; Cheilinus ketlitzii Valenciennes, 1840; Cheilinus calophthalmus Günther, 1867

= Snooty wrasse =

Species of fish

The snooty wrasse (Cheilinus oxycephalus), also known as the red maori wrasse, is a species of marine ray-finned fish from the family Labridae, the wrasses. It is a widespread Indo-Pacific reef fish.
