= International Trade in Endangered Species Act 2008 =

Malaysian environmental law

Parliament of Malaysia
- Long title: An Act to implement the Convention on International Trade in Endangered Species of Wild Fauna and Flora and to provide for other matters connected therewith.
- Citation: Act 686
- Territorial extent: Throughout Malaysia
- Passed by: Dewan Rakyat
- Passed: 19 December 2007
- Passed by: Dewan Negara
- Passed: 24 December 2007
- Royal assent: 5 February 2008
- Commenced: 14 February 2008

Legislative history

First chamber: Dewan Rakyat
- Bill title: International Trade in Endangered Species Bill 2007
- Bill citation: D.R. 50/2007
- Introduced by: Sazmi Miah, Parliamentary Secretary to the Minister of Natural Resources and Environment
- First reading: 5 December 2007
- Second reading: 19 December 2007
- Third reading: 19 December 2007

Second chamber: Dewan Negara
- Bill title: International Trade in Endangered Species Bill 2007
- Bill citation: D.R. 50/2007
- Member(s) in charge: Sazmi Miah, Parliamentary Secretary to the Minister of Natural Resources and Environment
- First reading: 24 December 2007
- Second reading: 24 December 2007
- Third reading: 24 December 2007

Keywords
- International trade, endangered species
- Status: In force

The International Trade in Endangered Species Act 2008 (Malay: Akta Perdagangan Antarabangsa Mengenai Spesies Terancam 2008) is an Act of the Parliament of Malaysia. It was enacted to implement the Convention on International Trade in Endangered Species of Wild Fauna and Flora and to provide for other matters connected therewith.

== Preamble ==
1. WHEREAS the Convention on International Trade in Endangered Species of Wild Fauna and Flora was signed at Washington, D.C., on 3 March 1973:
2. AND WHEREAS Malaysia deposited her instrument of accession on 20 October 1977 and therefore in accordance with Article XXII of the convention, the said Convention entered into force as far as Malaysia is concerned on 18 January 1978:

== Structure ==
The International Trade in Endangered Species Act 2008, in its current form (14 February 2008), consists of 6 Parts containing 55 sections and 3 schedules (including no amendment).

- Part I: Preliminary
- Part II: Authorities
- Part III: Trade of Scheduled Species
- Part IV: Permit, Certificate and Registration
- Part V: Power Relating to Enforcement, Seizure, Arrest, etc.
- Part VI: General
- Schedules
