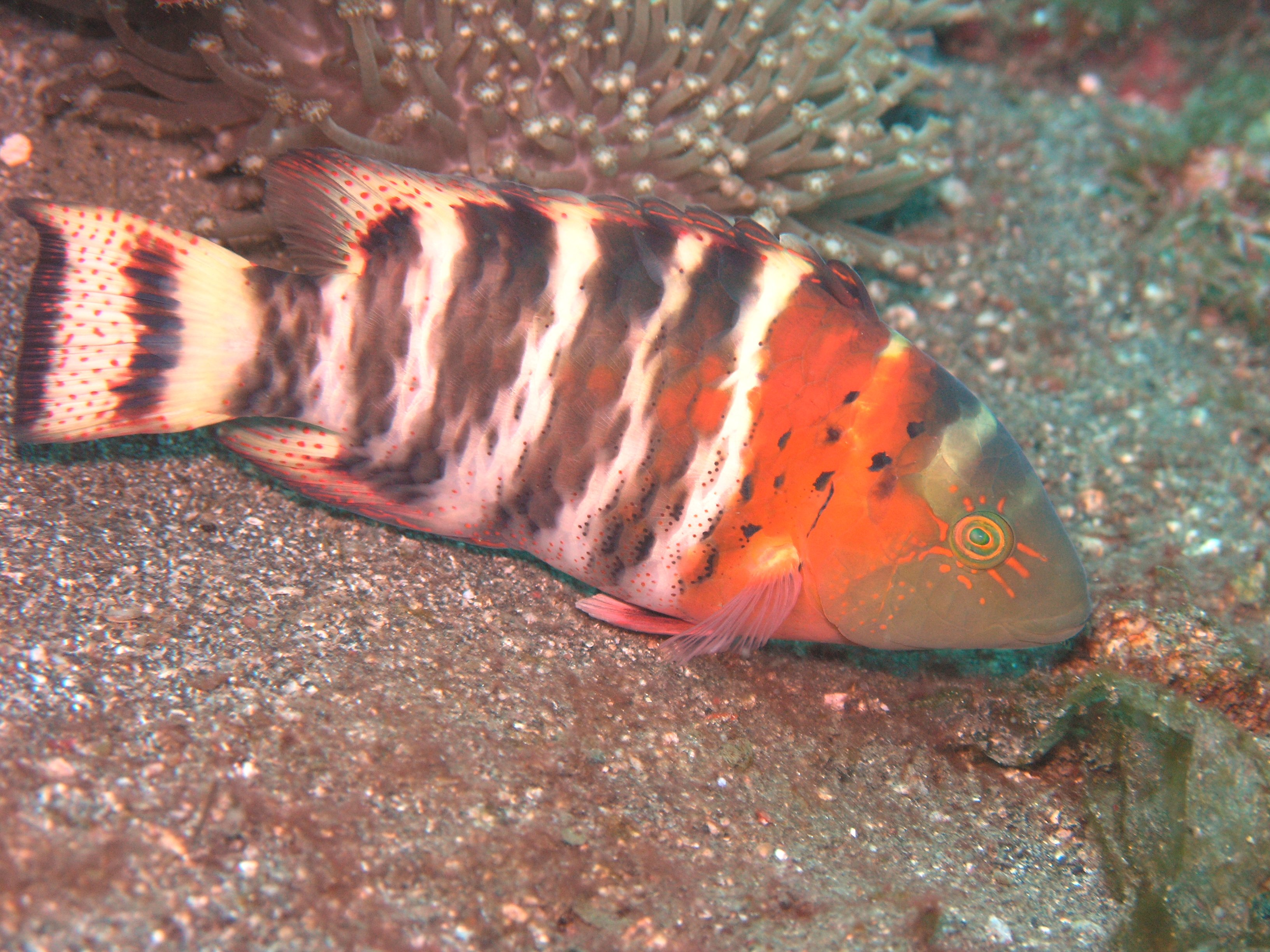

Conservation status
- Least Concern (IUCN 3.1)

Scientific classification
- Kingdom: Animalia
- Phylum: Chordata
- Class: Actinopterygii
- Order: Labriformes
- Family: Labridae
- Genus: Concholabrus
- Species: C. fasciatus

Binomial name
- Concholabrus fasciatus (Bloch, 1791)

Synonyms
- List: Sparus fasciatus Bloch, 1791; Cheilinus fasciatus (Bloch, 1791); Cheilenus fasciatus (Bloch, 1791); Cheilinus fasciatus fasciatus (Bloch, 1791); Labrus enneacanthus Lacépède, 1801; Sparus bandatus Perry, 1810

= Red-breasted wrasse =

Species of fish

The red-breasted wrasse (Concholabrus fasciatus) is a species of wrasse native to the Indian Ocean and the western Pacific Ocean.

== Taxonomy ==
The red-breasted wrasse has long been placed within the genus Cheilinus, though the advent of genetic analysis revealed it was in fact closer to the slingjaw wrasses of genus Epibulus, being their sister taxon. As a result, it was moved to the newly erected genus Concholabrus in 2025, as part of a greater taxonomic revision of the wrasse family.

== Description ==
This species can reach a maximum of 40 cm (16 in) in standard length. Its head is greenish-blue, followed by a distinctive red-orange band followed by black and white stripes. Terminal phase fishes generally have a more pronounced red band and convex forehead than initial phase and juvenile fish.

== Distribution ==
The red-breasted wrasse is native to the tropical waters of the Indo-Pacific region from the Red Sea and the African coast to the islands of the western Pacific.

== Habitat and diet ==
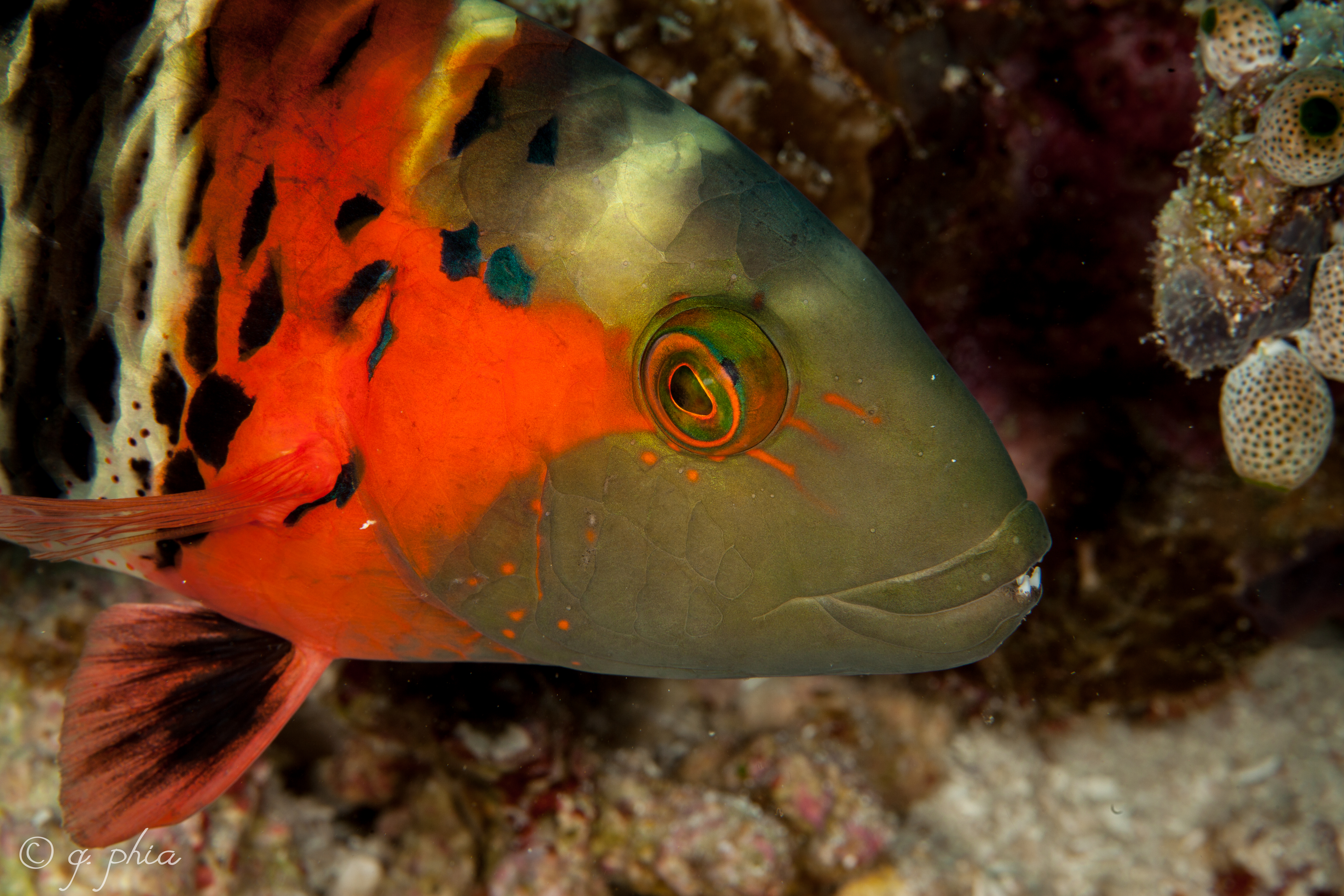
In Wakatobi National Park, 2018

The red-breasted wrasse lives in lagoons and seaward reefs in areas mixing rubble, coral, and sand at depths of from 4 to 60 m (13 to 197 ft) though rarer below 40 m (130 ft).

It feeds mainly on crustaceans, sea urchins, mollusks, and other hard-shelled invertebrates.
