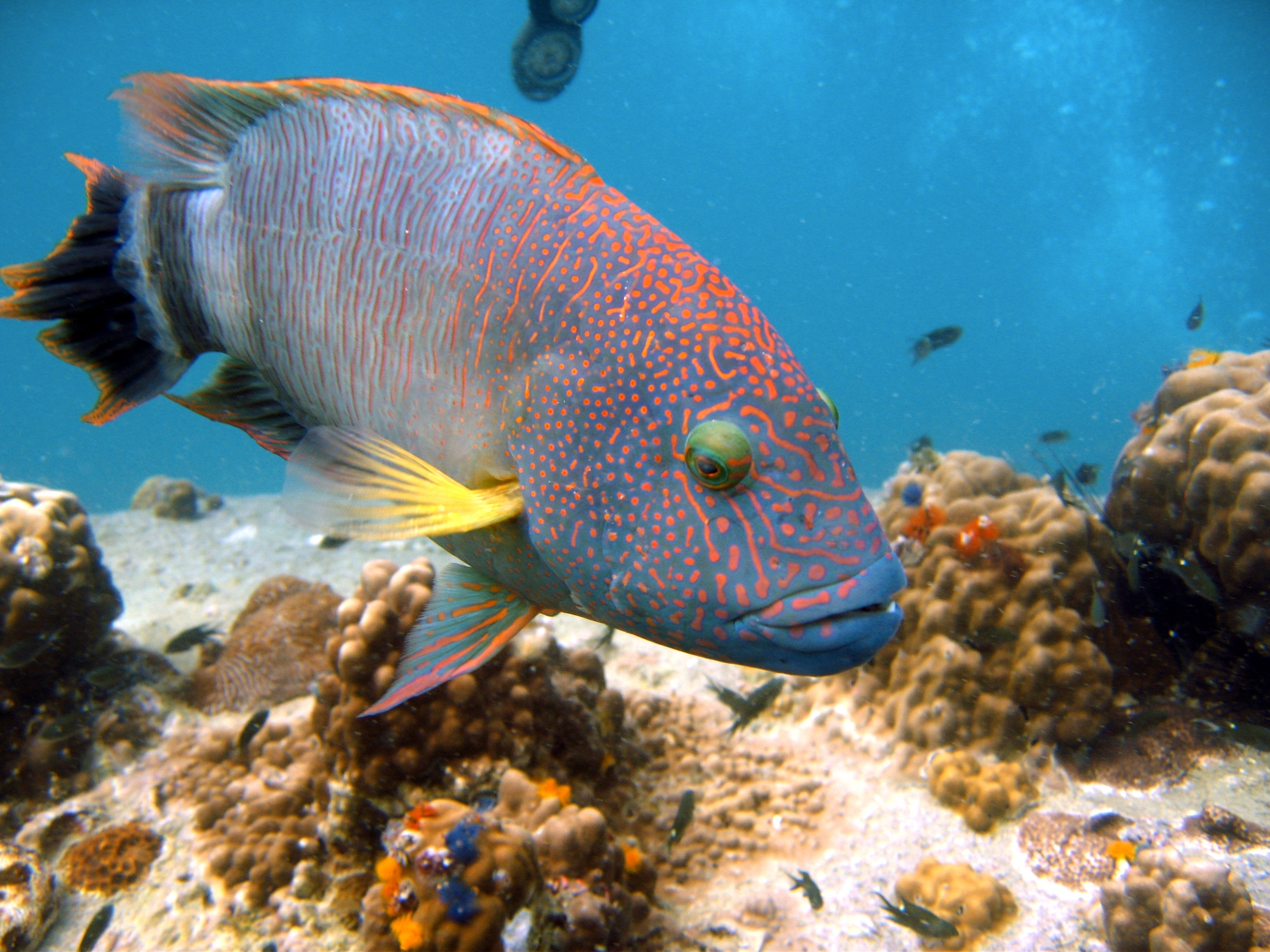

Conservation status
- Least Concern (IUCN 3.1)

Scientific classification
- Kingdom: Animalia
- Phylum: Chordata
- Class: Actinopterygii
- Division: Teleostei
- Order: Labriformes
- Family: Labridae
- Genus: Cheilinus
- Species: C. trilobatus

Binomial name
- Cheilinus trilobatus (Lacépède, 1801)

Synonyms
- Cheilinus sinuosus Quoy & Gaimard, 1824; Cheilinus maculosus Valenciennes, 1840; Cheilinus rivulatus Valenciennes, 1840; Cheilinus festivus Valenciennes, 1840; Cheilinus nebulosus Richardson, 1846; Cheilinus tetrazona Bleeker, 1853; Cheilinus fasciatopunctatus Steindachner, 1863; Cheilinus pulchellus Sauvage, 1880

= Tripletail wrasse =

Species of fish

The tripletail wrasse (Cheilinus trilobatus) is a species of marine ray-finned fish from the family Labridae, the wrasses.

== Description ==
It has a moderately deep body with a tri-lobed tail. Its body is green to brown with molted purple and red markings.there are 4 vertical dark stripes on its body. Its head has red spots and red lines radiating from its eye.

== Habitat ==
It lives in lagoons and seaward reefs at depths of 1–30 metres (3 ft 3 in – 98 ft 5 in).

== Diet ==
It eats shelled benthic invertebrates such as mollusks and crustaceans, but sometimes fish.
