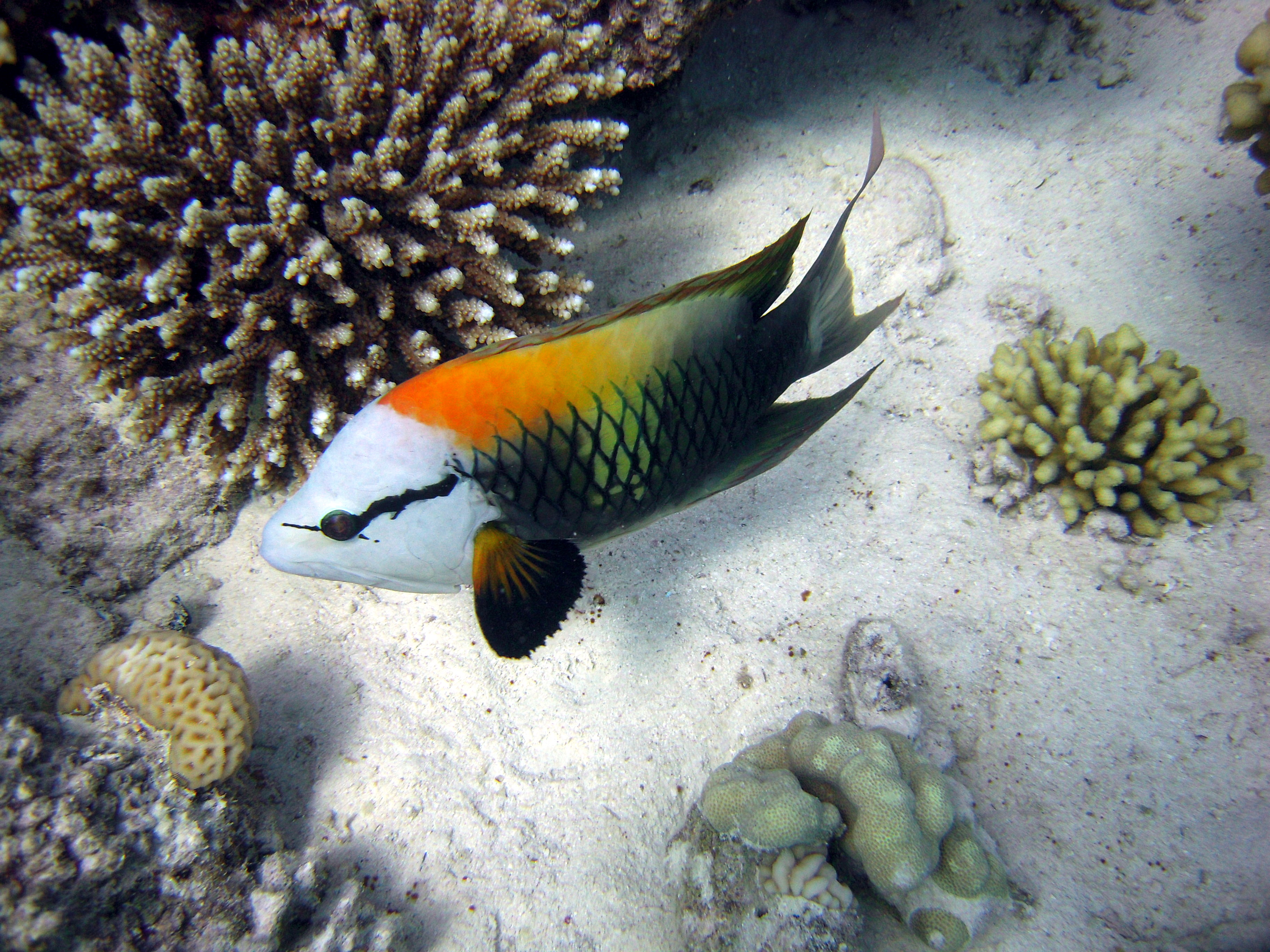
- Male
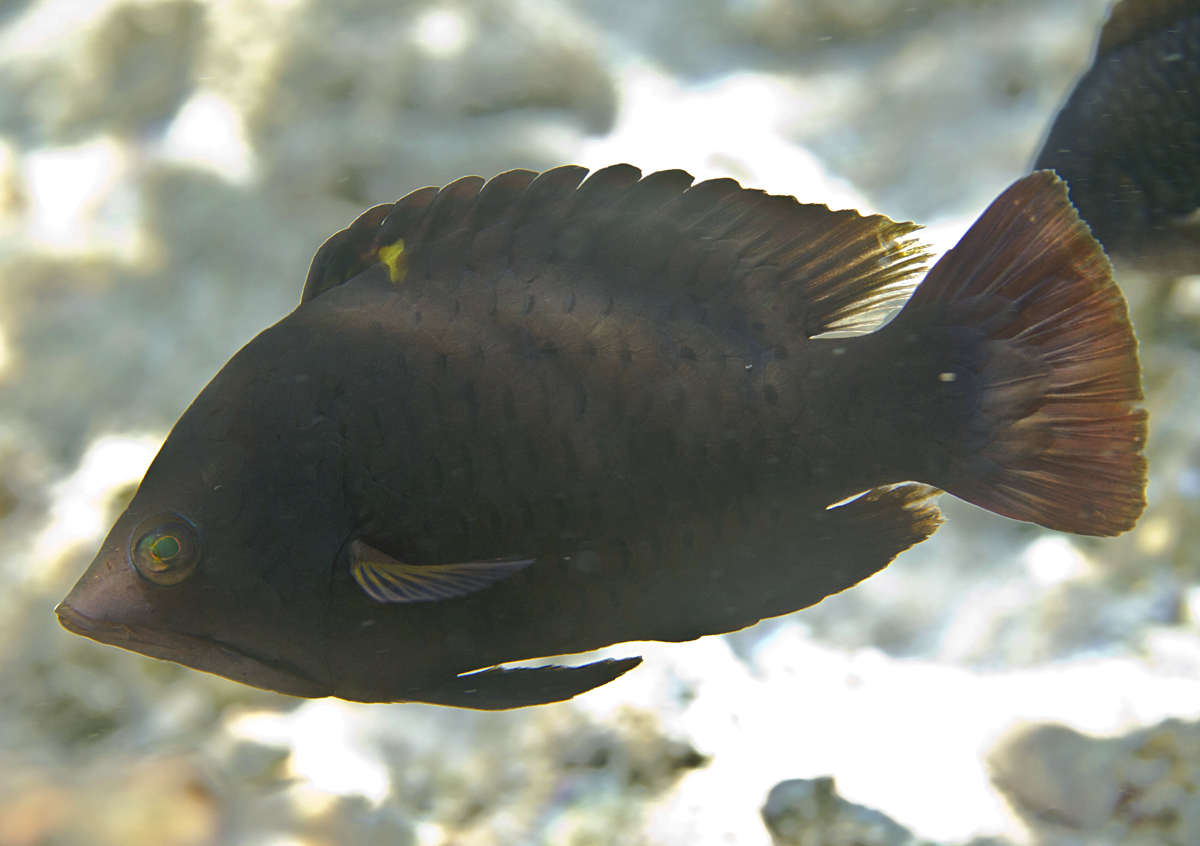
- Dark morph female

Conservation status
- Least Concern (IUCN 3.1)

Scientific classification
- Kingdom: Animalia
- Phylum: Chordata
- Class: Actinopterygii
- Division: Teleostei
- Order: Labriformes
- Family: Labridae
- Genus: Epibulus
- Species: E. insidiator

Binomial name
- Epibulus insidiator (Pallas, 1770)

Synonyms
- List: Sparus insidiator Pallas, 1770; Epibulus insidiator var. flava Bleeker, 1849; Epibulus insidiator var. fusca Bleeker, 1849; Epibulus striatus Day, 1871

= Sling-jaw wrasse =

Species of fish

The slingjaw wrasse (Epibulus insidiator) is a species of wrasse from the family Labridae which is native to the tropical waters of the Indo-Pacific where it occurs around coral reefs. Along with its sister species in the genus Epibulus, this species is notable for its highly protrusible jaws, an adaptation for feeding in complex aquatic environments. This species is of minor importance to local commercial fisheries and can be found in the aquarium trade.

== Taxonomy ==
Epibulus insidiator was first described as Sparus insidiator by Peter Simon Pallas in 1770. In 1815, Georges Cuvier moved Sparus insidiator to a new genus, Epibulus, which remained monotypic for around two centuries. A second species, Epibulus brevis, was described in 2008, being the sister to the type species of Epibulus, E. insidiator.

=== Etymology ===
Epibulus comes from Greek; epi meaning over, in front, and boleo meaning to throw. The specific epithet, insidiator, means "ambusher" or "lurker." This name is thought to have been used among early naturalists because this species was believed to feed on terrestrial insects by spitting drops of water from its elongated mouth.

== Distribution ==
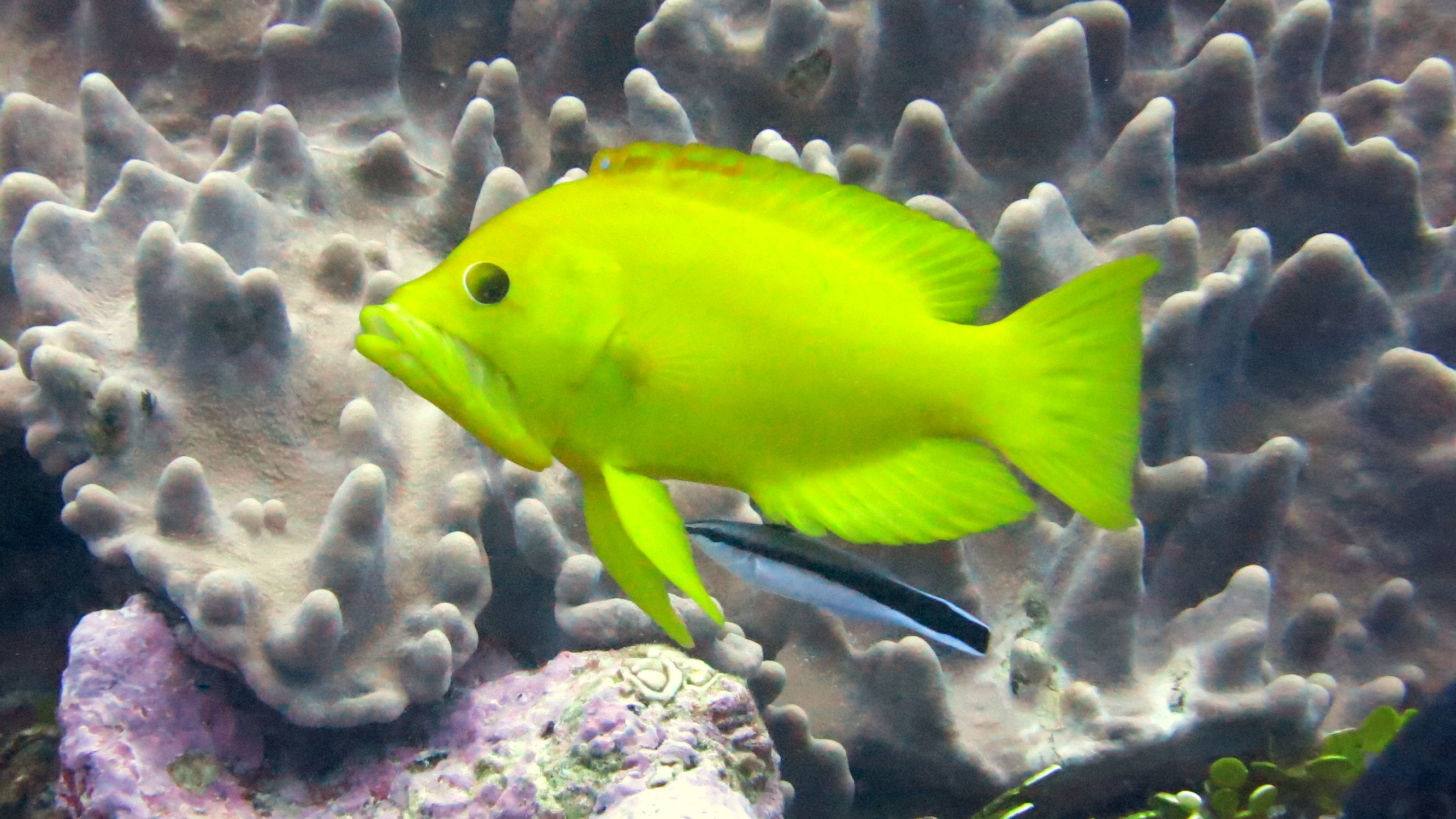
Female attended by a bluestreak cleaner wrasse, at Palmyra Atoll

The slingjaw wrasse is found in a wide area of the Indo-Pacific region from the eastern coast of Africa including Madagascar and the Red Sea, through the Indian Ocean coastline and islands into the Pacific, as far east as Johnston Atoll in Hawaii, although vagrants sometimes occur in the main Hawaiian chain. It reaches north to Japan and south to New Caledonia. It is also found along the northern coasts of Australia from the Houtman Abrolhos archipelago to reefs of the Coral Sea off Queensland.

== Description ==
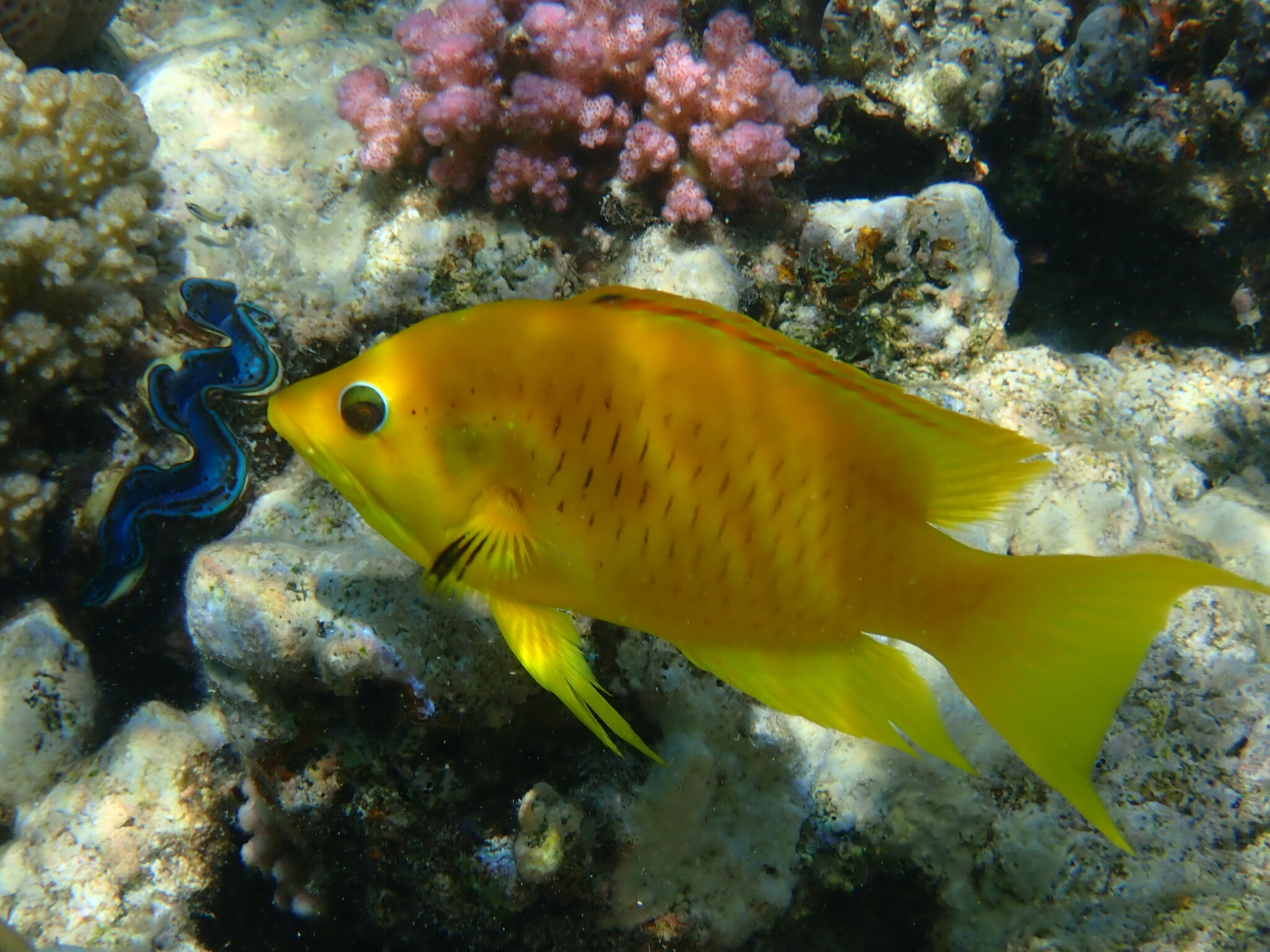
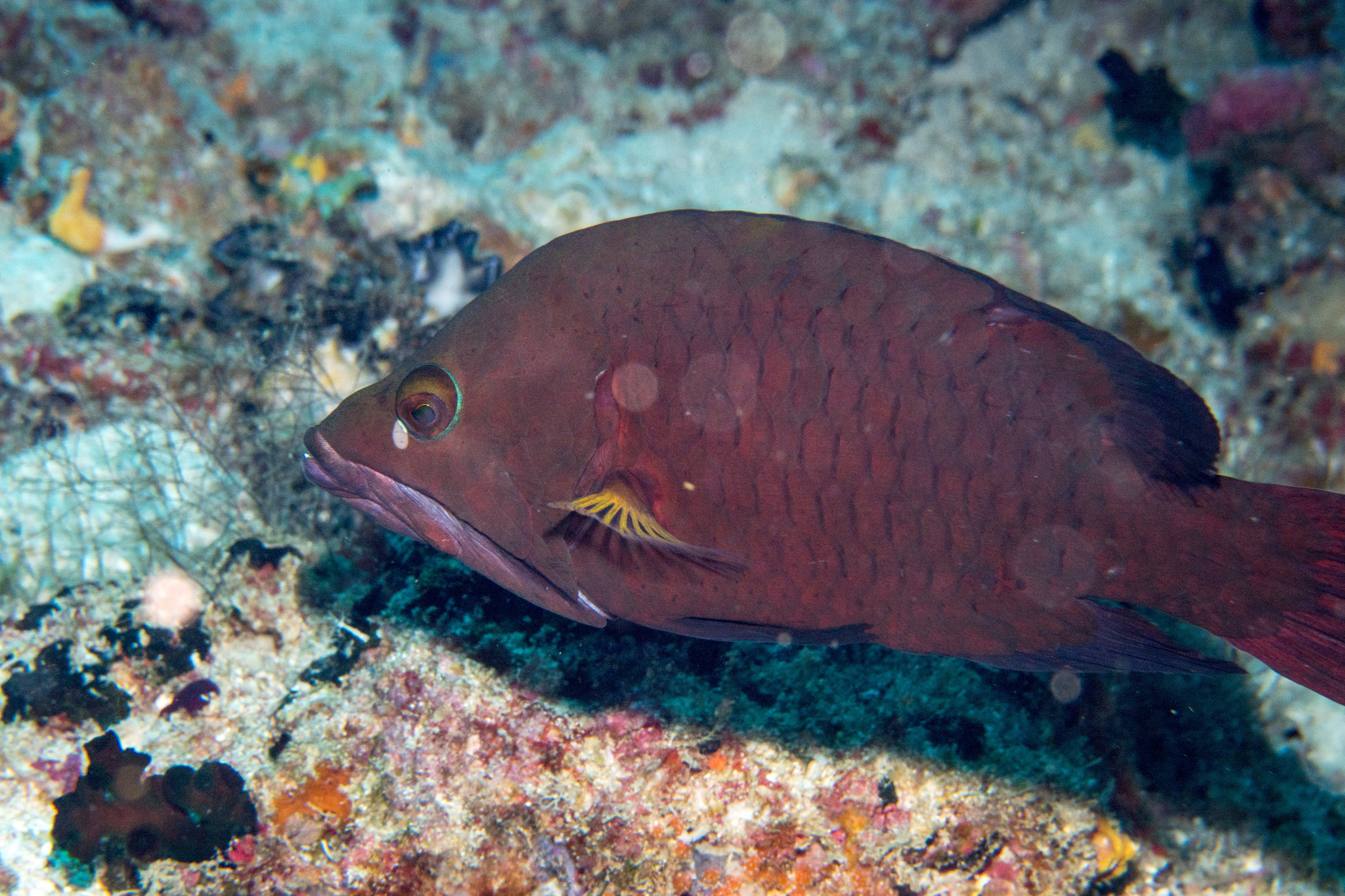
Females may either be yellow (top) or dark brown (bottom)

Juveniles are brown with thin white bars on their flanks and white lines radiating out from their eyes, while the females can be either bright yellow or dark brown. The yellow female morph may potentially be an instance of mimicry, being a similar shade to a number of damselfish species.

The males of this species are greyish-brown with orange on the back, a yellowish transverse bar on the flank and a pale grey to white head which is marked with a thin black stripe running through the eye. The scales of the male's body are edged with darker pigment. Intermediately patterned individuals which have yellow blotches, a pale tail and sometimes with black pectoral fins do occur.

The dorsal fin has 9–10 spines and 9–11 soft rays while the anal fin has 3 spines and 8–9 soft rays. The largest specimens may attain a standard length of 54 centimetres (21 in).

The similar latent sling-jaw wrasse (Epibulus brevis) has a more restricted distribution, is smaller, and has different coloration, with duller coloured males. The females have black pigment on their pectoral fins and longer pectoral fins. They also lack the black lines radiating from the eyes.

=== Extreme jaw protrusion ===
The sling-jaw wrasse possesses the most extreme jaw protrusion found among fishes. The species can extend its jaws up to 65% the length of its head. The speed and length to which the jaw protrudes allows it to capture small fish and crustaceans. Epibulus wrasse possess a unique ligament (vomero-interopercular) and two enlarged ligaments (interoperculo-mandibular and premaxilla-maxilla); along with a few changes to the form of cranial bones, these adaptations allow it to achieve extreme jaw protrusion. The ability to protrude the jaws to such extreme lengths is a result of drastic reorganization of the jaws' linkage system from that of the closely related Cheilinus wrasses, such that it is composed of both a four-bar linkage system and a six-bar linkage system.

Female being attended by a cleaner wrasse

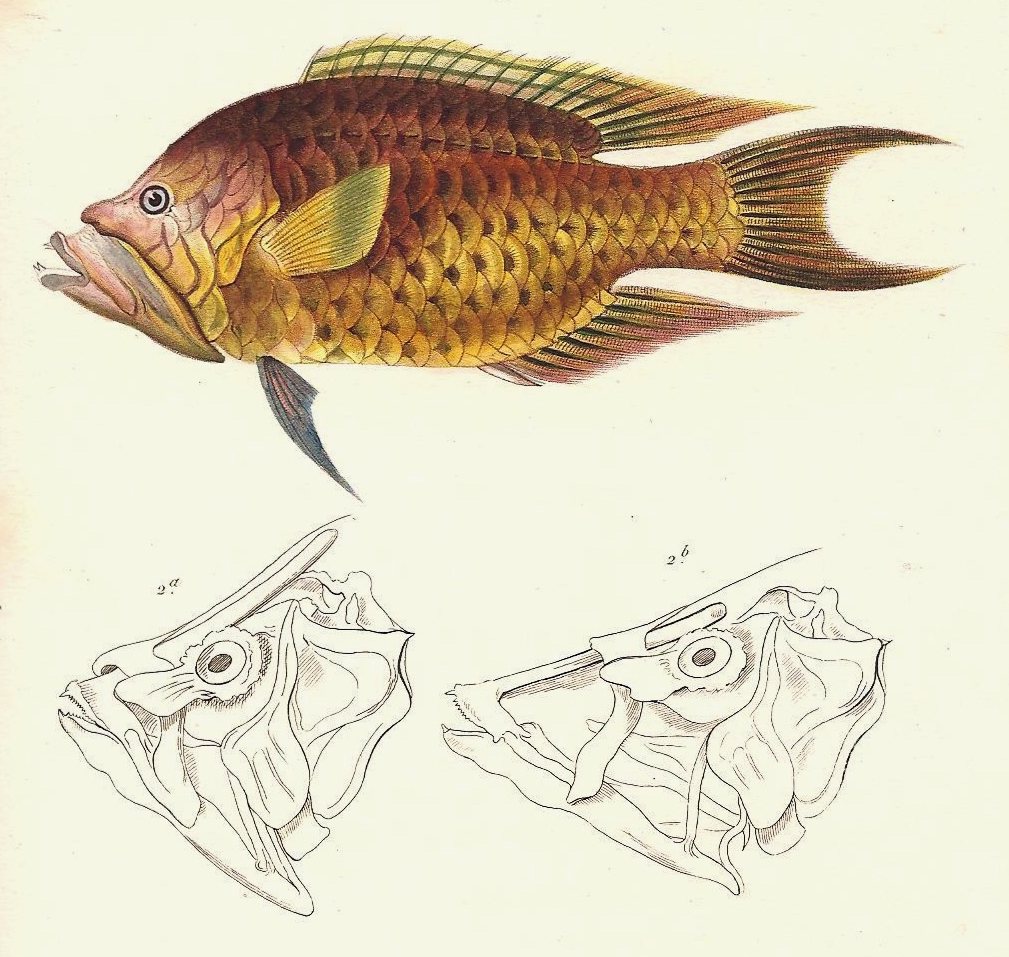
Anatomical drawing showing jaw protrusion

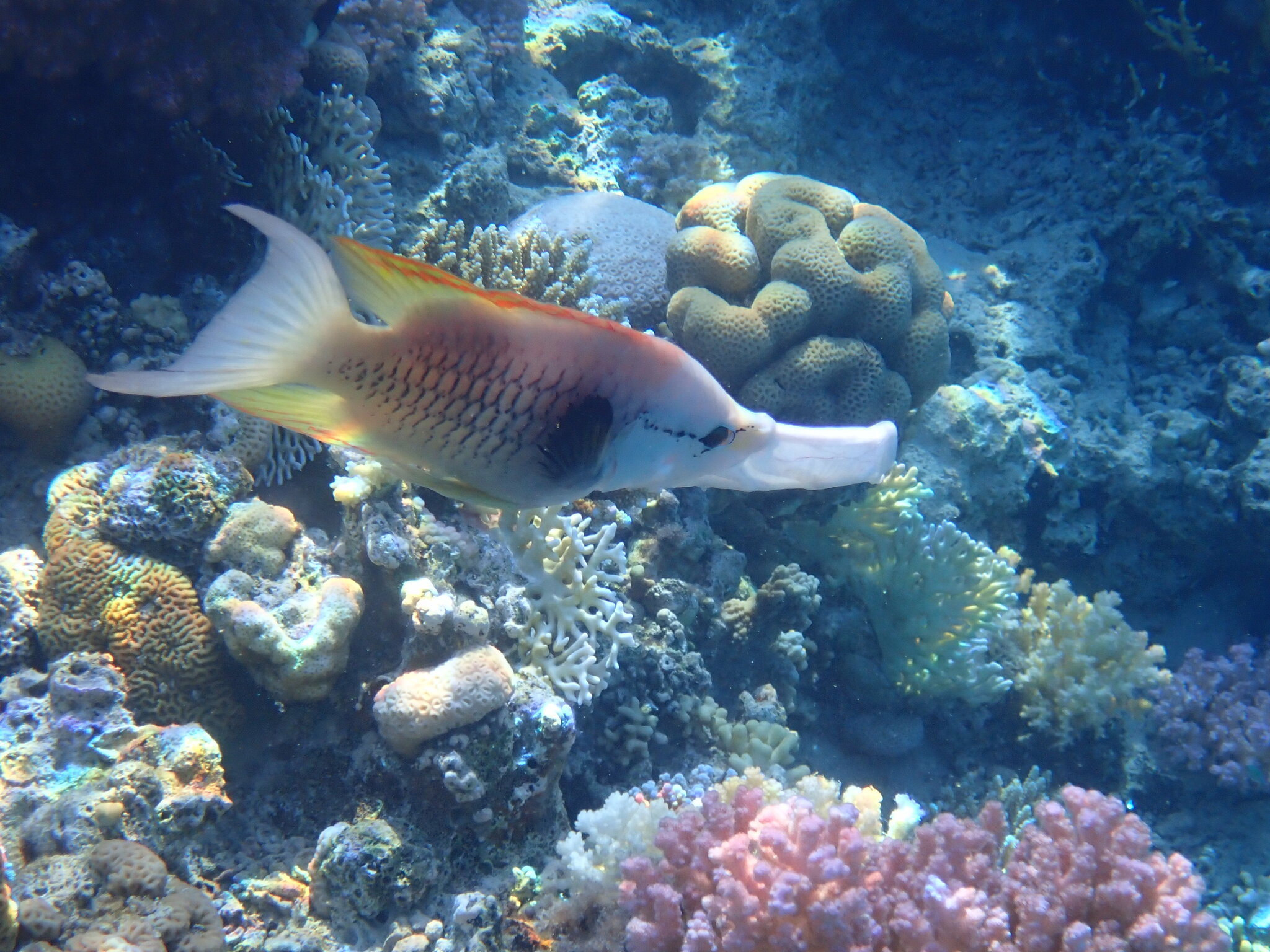
Transitional form showing jaw protrusion

== Biology ==
The slingjaw wrasse is a benthopelagic species which occurs in coral-rich areas of lagoon and seaward reefs, with adults typically found along reef slopes or near drop-offs. They feed on small crustaceans living in the coral and on fishes.

The species may change colour to perform aggressive mimicry. In the Red Sea, Indian sailfin tangs (Zebrasoma desjardinii) sometimes form feeding aggregations to invade the feeding areas of territorial herbivorous fish. When this occurs, sling-jaw wrasses have been found to join the aggregation by changing to a dark brown colour similar to the tangs, hiding amongst the school using similar movements to the grazing tangs. While mimicking, they hunt for small fish.

=== Reproduction ===
This species is likely to exhibit protogynous hermaphrodity, first maturing as a female and later on transitioning to male. Males hold a territory with an area of 500–1,000 square metres (5,400–10,800 ft^{2}) and a number of females appear to have their home ranges within his territory. The colour of the males was observed to become more intense during courtship, and they also swim with their caudal fin collapsed and held upwards at an angle while the anal fin was folded and stretched downwards. The intensity of the male's colour can return to normal when they feel threatened. Spawning took place around high tide. When spawning the pair were observed to ascend 2–3 metres (6.6–9.8 ft). Spawning seems to be initiated by the females and has been recorded in March, April, May, July, September and October.

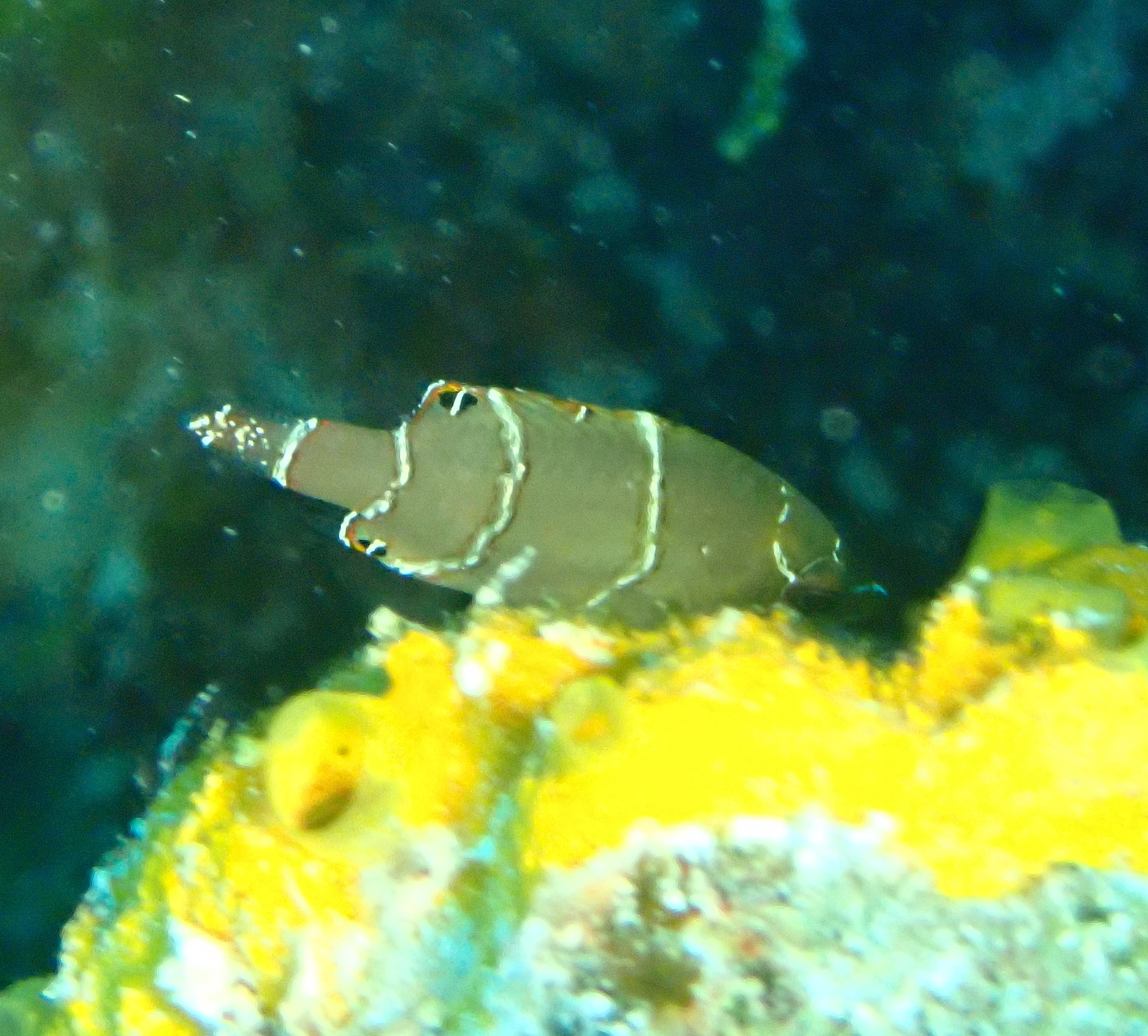
Juvenile

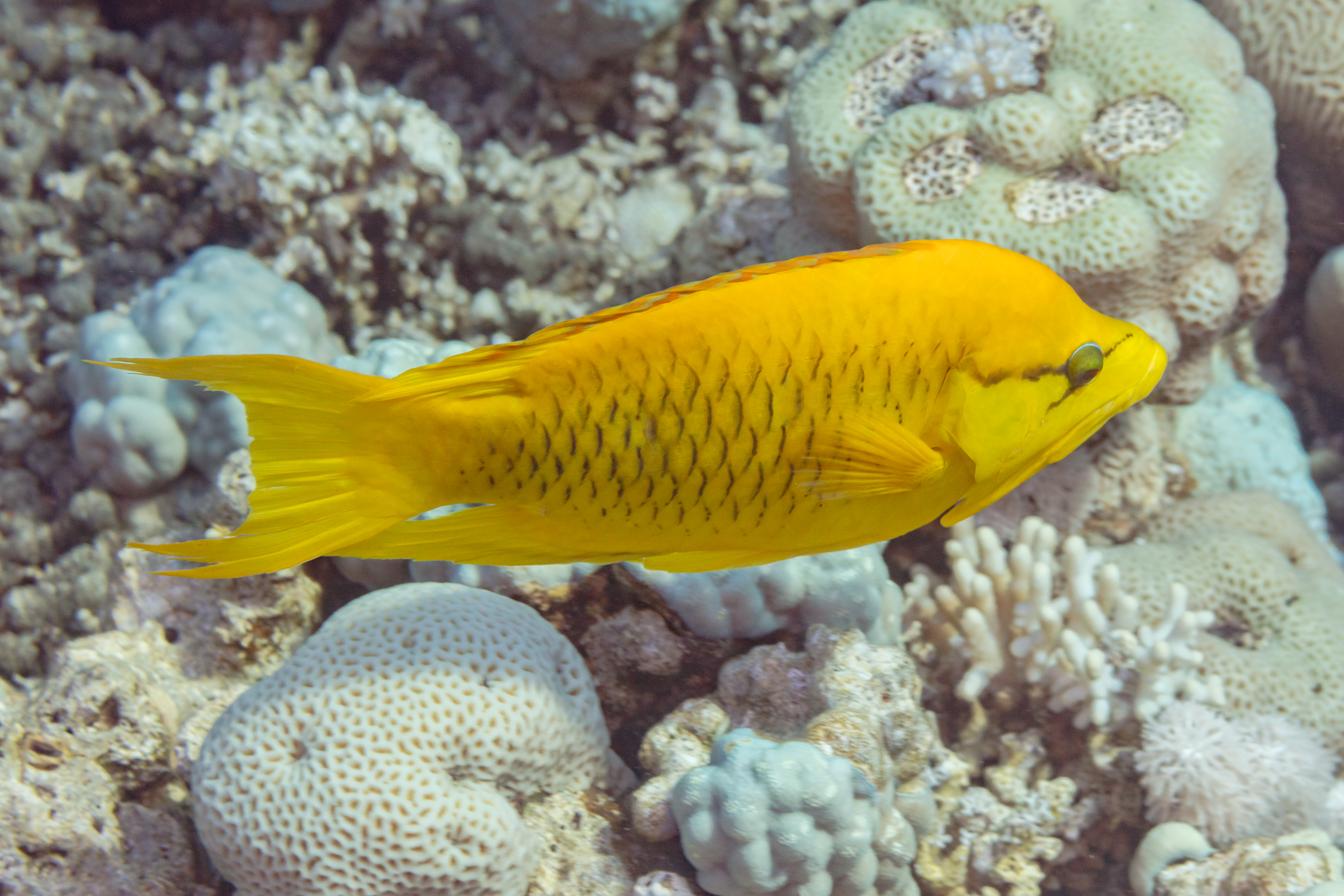
Female

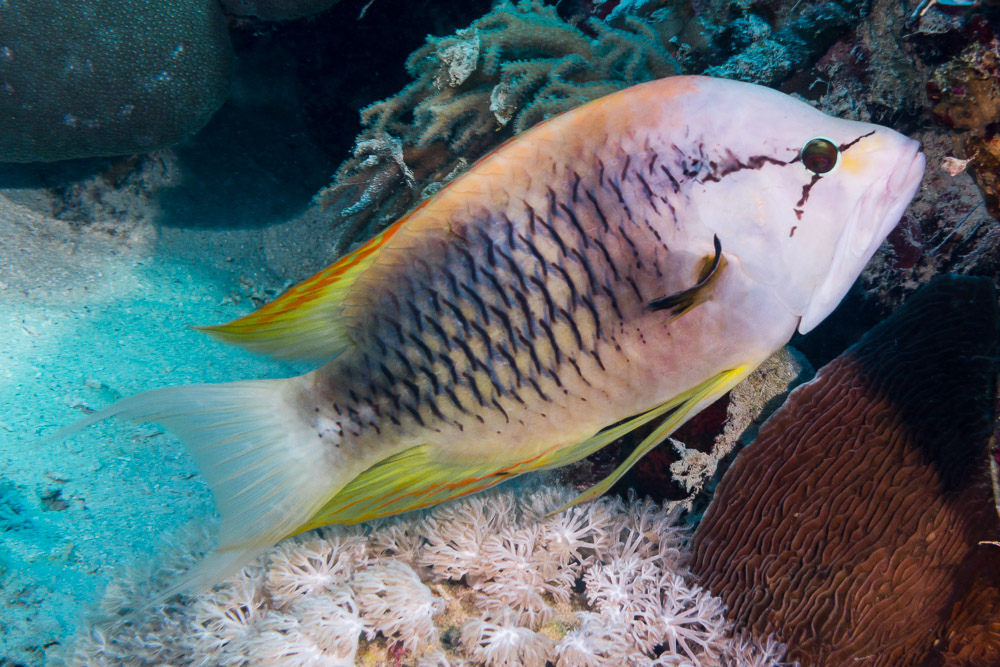
Transitioning from female to male

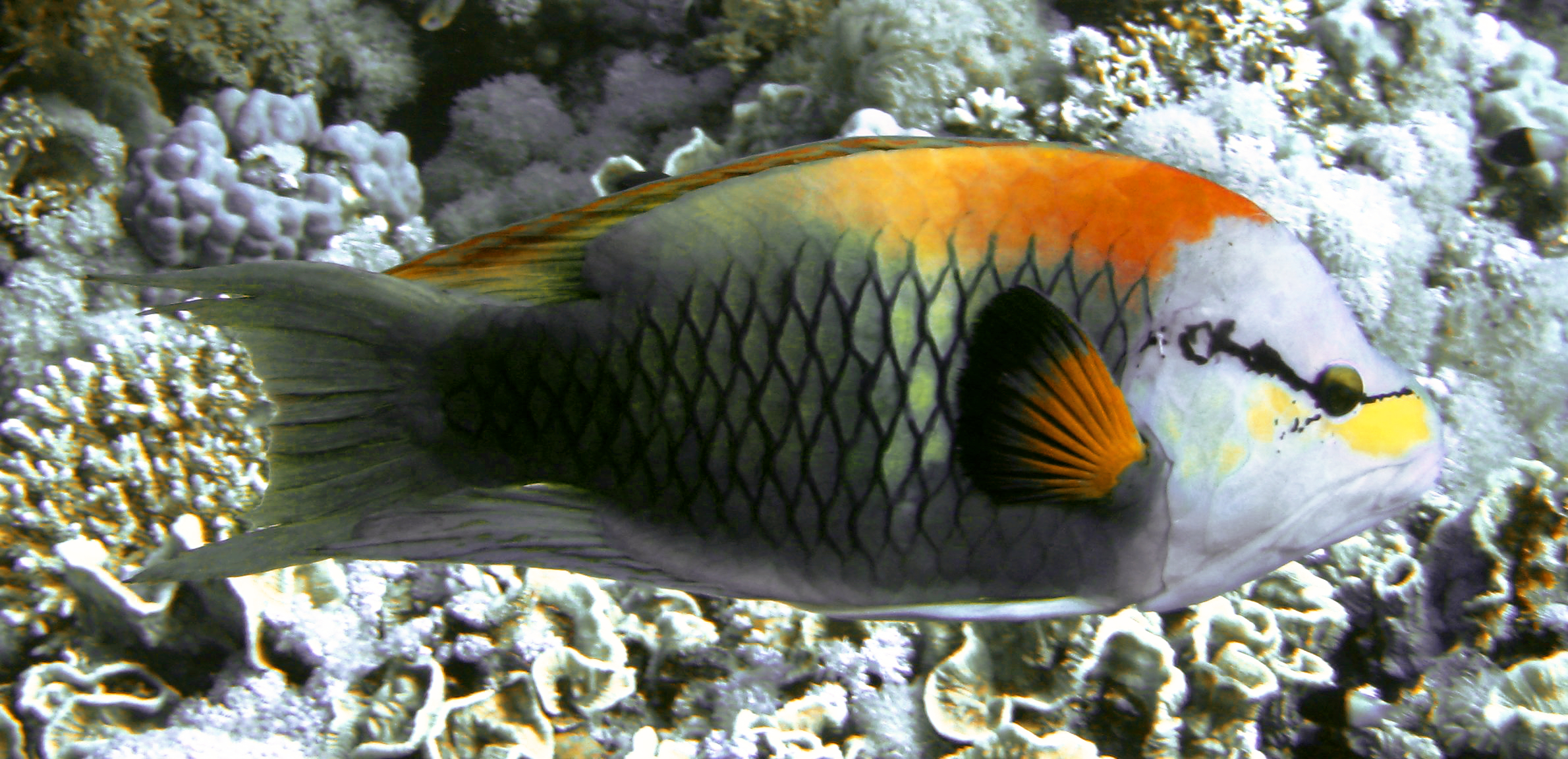
Male

== Relation to humans ==
The slingjaw wrasse is collected for food in many parts of its range, and it is also collected for the aquarium trade. In the two decades leading up to 2008, the average body size of the fish caught in Guam did not decline. The species is considered of least concern by the International Union for Conservation of Nature.
