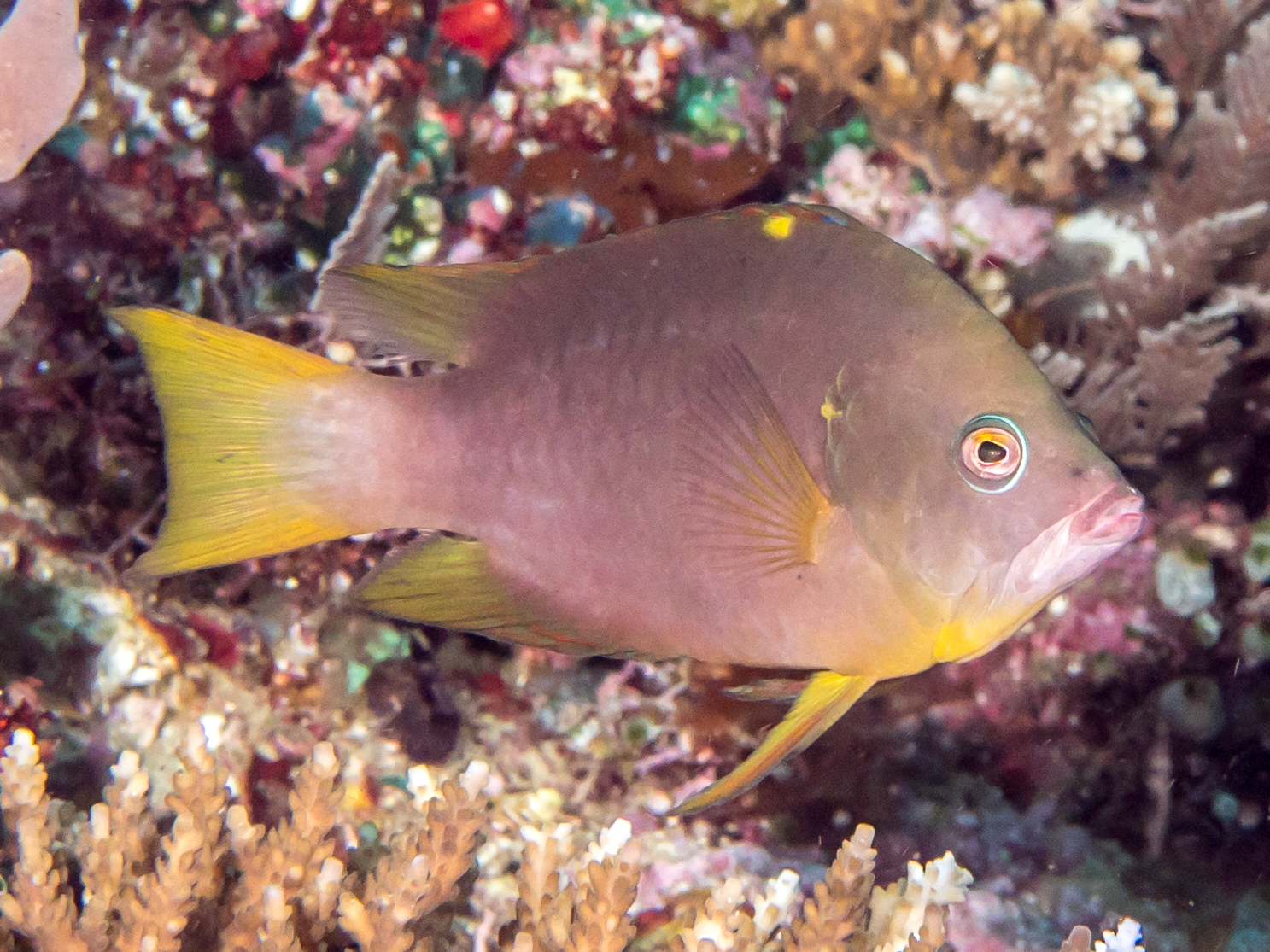

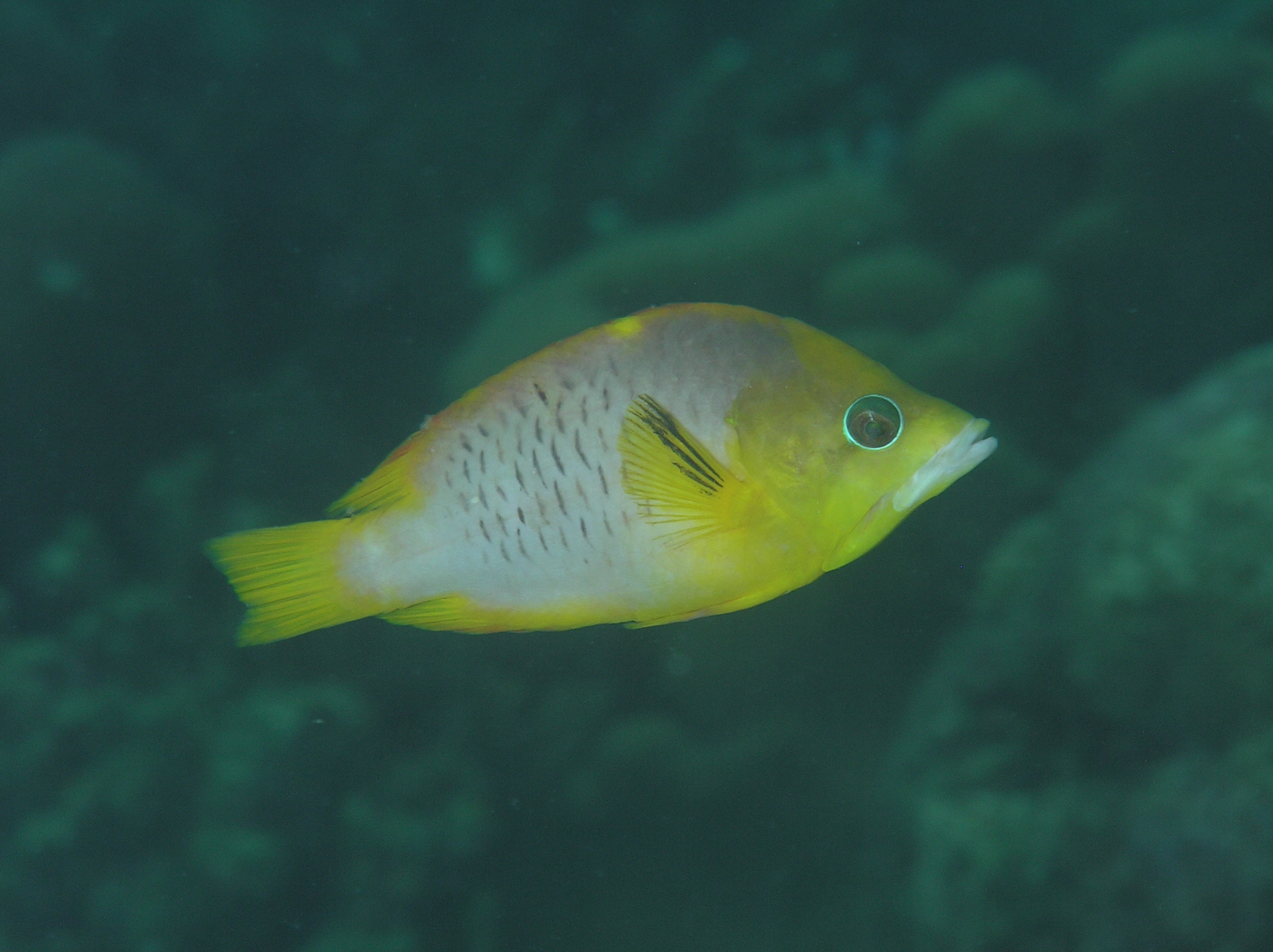
- Male (top) and female (bottom)

Conservation status
- Least Concern (IUCN 3.1)

Scientific classification
- Kingdom: Animalia
- Phylum: Chordata
- Class: Actinopterygii
- Order: Labriformes
- Family: Labridae
- Genus: Epibulus
- Species: E. brevis

Binomial name
- Epibulus brevis Carlson, Randall & Dawson, 2008

= Latent sling-jaw wrasse =

Species of fish

Latent sling-jaw wrasse (Epibulus brevis) is a species of ray-finned fish from the wrasse Family Labridae which is associated with reefs in the south-western Pacific Ocean.

== Description ==
The latent sling-jaw wrasse is similar to its sole congener, the sling-jaw wrasse (Epibulus insidiator) but can be easily distinguished by the absence of black "streaks" around the eyes, its comparatively duller colouration in the males, the possession of black areas on the fins in the majority of the females, its slightly longer pectoral fins and its smaller size. The male latent sling-jaw wrasse is brown with a yellow throat, yellowish lobes of the tail and a yellow marking at the gill slit. The females are more variable in colour and can be dark to pale brown, or yellow or almost white and most have black markings on their pectoral fins. The juveniles are brown to greenish-brown in colour and have black spots on the dorsal and anal fins. This species has 9 spines and 10 soft rays in its dorsal fin and 3 spines and 8 soft rays in its anal fin. As with its congener, they have long jaws, with its rearmost part extending almost to the base of the pelvic fins; this anatomy allows them to significantly protrude their jaws, hence the common name.

== Distribution ==
The latent sling-jaw wrasse occurs in the western Pacific and has been recorded from Palau, Luzon and Cebu Province in the Philippines, Bali, Lombok, Sulawesi and Flores in Indonesia, Milne Bay Province and Madang Province in eastern Papua New Guinea, the Sololmon Islands and the Hibernia Reef, which lies within the territory of the Ashmore and Cartier Islands in the Timor Sea, to the north-west of Western Australia.

== Habitat and biology ==
Epibulus brevis is found in the sheltered waters of inshore reefs and lagoons as well as in nearby sea grass beds. This fish is a protogynous hermaphrodite which has been recorded spawning in the late afternoons, without any correlation to the state of the tide. The males do not have as obvious a display as the sling-jaw wrasse and usually display just above the substrate, although they will display higher in the water column, by swimming in a conspicuous manner around their territory to attract the attention of the females. In courtship, the male folds his caudal fin, holds the dorsal and anal fins close to his body while swimming around the prospective females all the time displaying in a quite understated way. When spawning occurs these fish show a varied rush which can be a low arch or a brief and rather leisurely upward movement, at which time the median fins of the male are spread away from his body. The latent sling-jaw wrasse is a carnivore which feeds on crabs and other crustaceans, as well as smaller fishes. The adults are solitary when not breeding. The juveniles are very secretive and hide in crevices or among branching corals.

== Human usage ==
The latent sling-jaw wrasse is found in the aquarium trade and the yellow colour morph of the females is highly sought after.

== Species description ==
Epibulus brevis was formally described in 2008 by Bruce A. Carlson, John Ernest Randall & Michael N. Dawson with the type locality given as Ngerikuul (Nikko Bay), off south shore of Bukrrairong Island in Koror, Palau. The specific name brevis is Latin for "short" and is a reference of the smaller size of E. brevis in comparison to E. insidiator.
