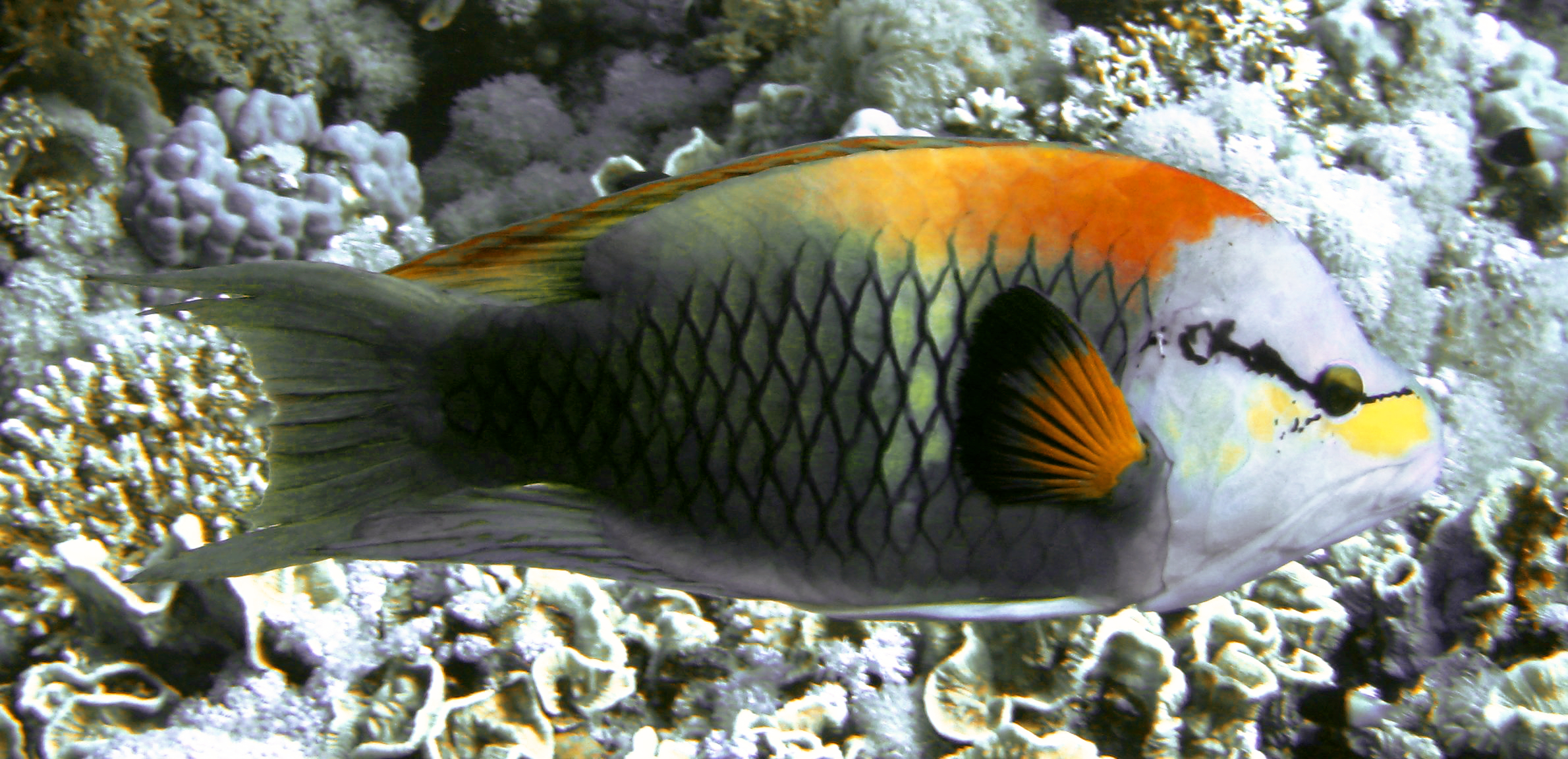
- Sling-jaw wrasse (E. insidiator)
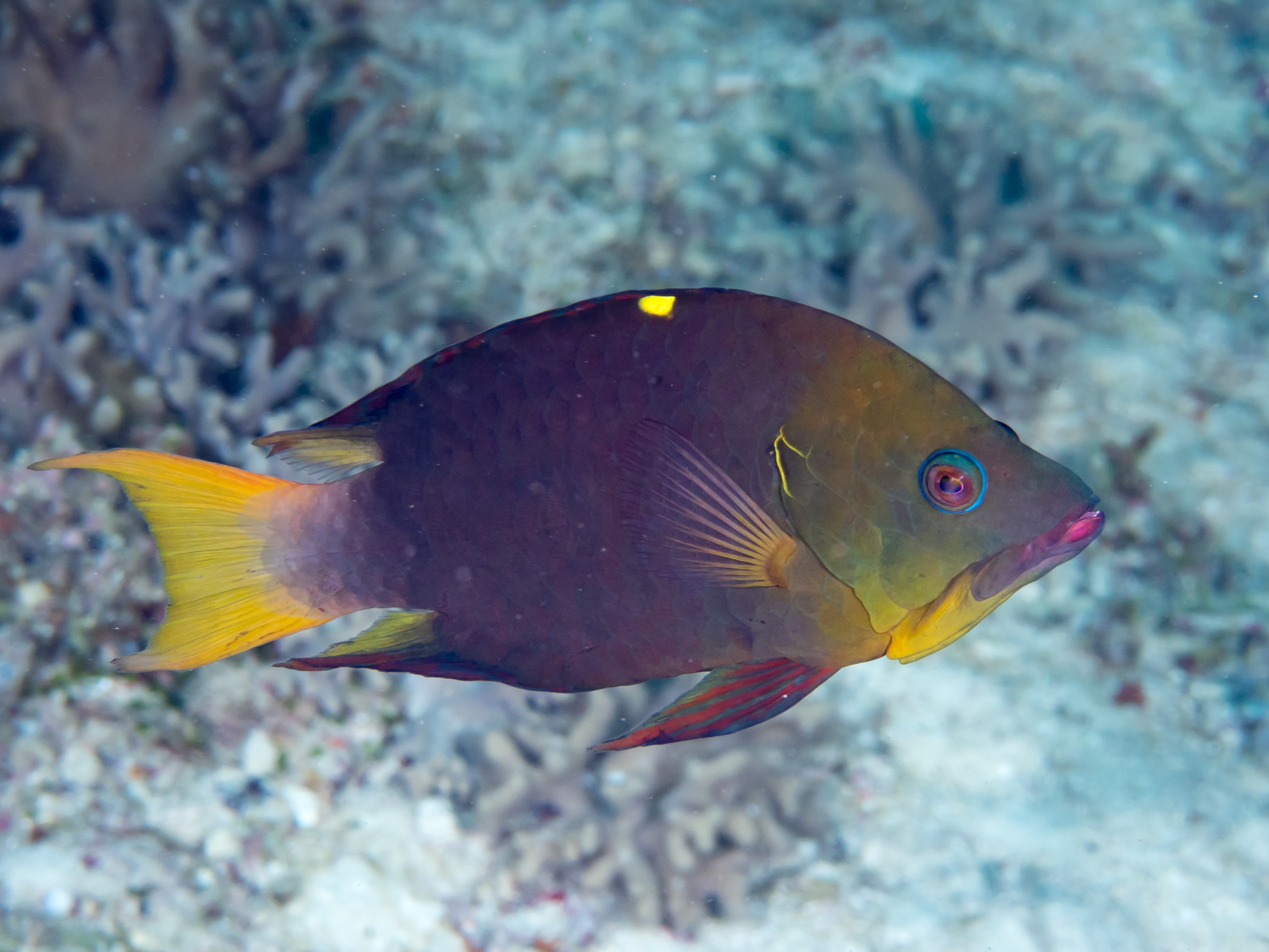
- Latent slingjaw wrasse (E. brevis)

Scientific classification
- Kingdom: Animalia
- Phylum: Chordata
- Class: Actinopterygii
- Division: Teleostei
- Order: Labriformes
- Family: Labridae
- Subfamily: Cheilininae
- Genus: Epibulus; G. Cuvier, 1815

Type species
- Sparus insidiator Pallas, 1770

= Epibulus =

Genus of fishes

Epibulus is a genus of wrasses native to the Indian Ocean and the western Pacific Ocean.

== Species ==
The currently recognized species in this genus are:

- Epibulus brevis Carlson, J. E. Randall & M. N. Dawson, 2008 (latent sling-jaw wrasse)
- Epibulus insidiator (Pallas, 1770) (sling-jaw wrasse)
