= List of fish of the Persian Gulf =

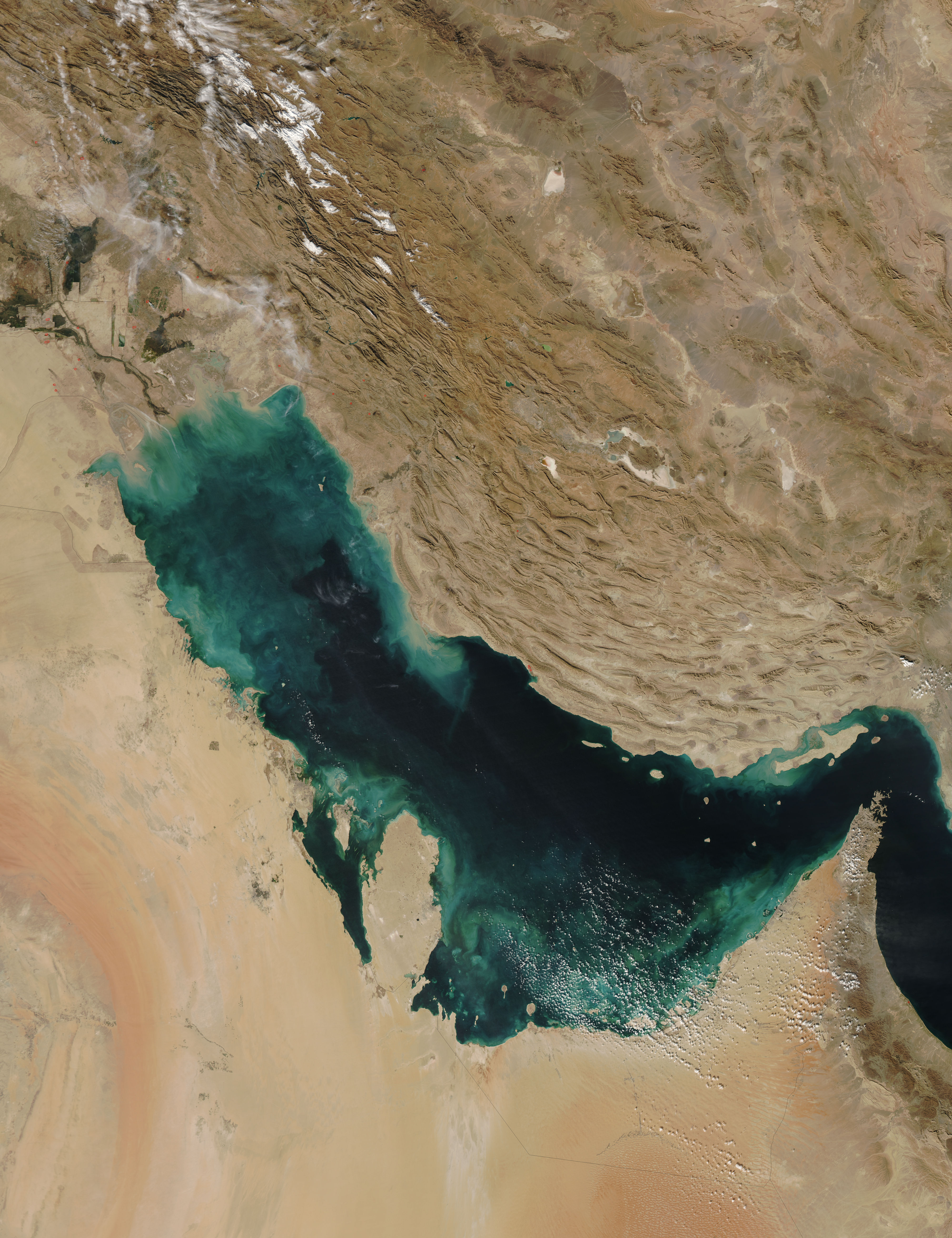
The Persian Gulf

This is a list of fish recorded from the Persian Gulf, a penetration of the Indian Ocean bordering Kuwait, Iran, Iraq, Qatar, Saudi Arabia, the United Arab Emirates, and an exclave of the sultanate of Oman. This list is mostly based on the IUCN Red List of Threatened Species and comprises locally used common names, scientific names and its relationship with humans, if needed.

List ordering is phylogenetic and taxonomy complies where possible with the current usage in Fishbase, however outdated taxa as the result of splits or renames of synonymy will be updated accordingly.

== Cartilaginous fishes ==
=== Orectolobiformes - groundsharks ===
Family	Scientific name	Common name	Local name	Regional importance	Conservation status	Image
Rhincodontidae	Rhincodon typus	Whale shark			Endangered	
Hemiscylliidae	Chiloscyllium arabicum	Arab carpetshark			Near threatened	
Stegostomidae	Stegostoma tigrinium	Zebra shark			Endangered	
Ginglymostomatidae	Nebrius ferrugineus	Tawny nurse shark			Vulnerable	

=== Lamniformes ===
Family	Scientific name	Common name	Local name	Regional importance	Conservation status	Image
Carchariidae	Carcharias taurus	Sandtiger shark			Critically endangered	

=== Carcharhiniformes - Requiem sharks, hammerheads, weaselsharks, and allies ===
Family	Scientific name	Common name	Local name	Regional importance	Conservation status	Image
Triakidae	Mustelus mosis	Arab smooth-hound			Near threatened	
Hemigaleidae	Hemipristis elongata	Snaggletooth shark			Endangered	
Hemigaleidae	Paragaleus longicaudatus	Slender weaselshark			Near threatened	
Hemigaleidae	Chaenogaleus macrostoma	Hooktooth shark			Near threatened	
Carcharhinidae	Carcharhinus amblyrhynchoides	Graceful shark			Vulnerable	
Carcharhinidae	Carcharhinus amboinensis	Pigeyed shark			Vulnerable	
Carcharhinidae	Carcharhinus dussumieri	White cheeked shark			Endangered	
Carcharhinidae	Carcharhinus leucas	Bull shark			Vulnerable	
Carcharhinidae	Carcharhinus limbatus	Common blacktip shark			Vulnerable	
Carcharhinidae	Carcharhinus brevipinna	Spinner shark			Vulnerable	
Carcharhinidae	Carcharhinus melanopterus	Black-tipped reef shark			Vulnerable	
Carcharhinidae	Carcharhinus plumbeus	Sandbar shark			Endangered	
Carcharhinidae	Carcharhinus sorrah	Spot-tail shark	(Kingdom of Hejaz) Yaryoor	Widely fished	Near threatened	
Carcharhinidae	Rhizoprionodon acutus	Milk shark	(Kingdom of Hejaz) Yaryoor	Widely fished	Vulnerable	
Carcharhinidae	Loxodon macrorhinus	Sliteye shark	(Kingdom of Hejaz) Yaryoor	Moderate fishery	Near threatened	
Galeocerdonidae	Galeocerdo cuvier	Tiger shark			Near threatened	
Sphyrnidae	Sphyrna mokarran	Great hammerhead		Widely fished	Critically endangered	
Sphyrnidae	Sphyrna lewini	Thcalloped hammerhead			Critically endangered	

=== Torpedoniformes ===
Family	Scientific name	Common name	Local name	Regional importance	Conservation status	Image
Narcinidae	Narcine timlei	Brown numbfish			Vulnerable	
Torpedinidae	Torpedo panthera	Panther torpedo			Endangered	
Torpedinidae	Torpedo sinuspersici	Persian gulf torpedo			Data deficient	

=== Rhinopristiformes - Skates, sawfish, and guitarfish ===
Family	Scientific name	Common name	Local name	Regional importance	Conservation status	Image
Rhinidae	Rhina ancylostoma	Bowmouth guitarfish			Critically endangered	
Rhinidae	Rhynchobatus djiddensis	Whitespotted wedgefish			Critically endangered	
Rhinidae	Rhynchobatus laevis	Smoothnose wedgefish			Critically endangered	
Rhinidae	Rhinobatos punctifer	Spotted guitarfish			Near threatened	
Glaucostegidae	Glaucostegus granulatus	Giant sharpnose guitarfish			Critically endangered	
Pristidae	Anoxypristis cuspidata	Knifetooth sawfish		Always rare, historically from Iran	Critically endangered	
Pristidae	Pristis zijsron	Green sawfish		Formerly abundant in the region, now extremely rare	Critically endangered	
Rajidae	Raja pita	Pita bread skate		Only one specimen has been documented	Data deficient	

=== Myliobatiformes - Rays ===
Family	Scientific name	Common name	Local name	Regional importance	Conservation status	Image
Dasyatidae	Himantura uarnak	honeycomb, or coachwhip ray			Endangered	
Dasyatidae	Maculabatis randalli	Arabian whipray		Endemic	Least concern	
Dasyatidae	Pastinachus sephen	Cowtail stingray			Near threatened	
Dasyatidae	Taeniura lymma	Bluespotted ribbon tail ray		Aquarium	Least concern	
Dasyatidae	Taeniurops meyeni	Round ribbon tail ray			Vulnerable	
Gymnuridae	Gymnura poecilura	Longtail butterfly ray			Vulnerable	
Aetobatidae	Aetobatus ocellatus	Spotted eagle ray			Endangered	
Myliobatidae	Aetomylaeus milvus	Kite ray			Endangered	
Myliobatidae	Aetomylaeus wafickii	Redtrim eagle ray			Vulnerable	
Rhinopteridae	Rhinoptera jayakari	Oman cownose ray			Endangered	
Mobulidae	Mobula mobular	Giant devil ray			Critically endangered	
Mobulidae	Mobula kuhlii	shortfin devil ray			endangered	

== Ray-finned fish ==
=== Elopiformes ===
Family	Scientific name	Common name	Local name	Regional importance	Conservation status	Image
Megalopidae	Megalops cyprinoides	Indo-Pacific tarpon			Data deficient	

=== Anguilliformes - Eels ===
Family	Scientific name	Common name	Local name	Regional importance	Conservation status	Image
Muraenidae	Echidna nebulosa	Snowflake moray		Aquarium	Least concern	
Muraenidae	Gymnomuraena zebra	Zebra moray		Aquarium	Least concern	
Muraenidae	Gymnothorax arabicus	Arabian false brown moray			Not evaluated	
Muraenidae	Gymnothorax favagineus	Laced moray			Least concern	
Muraenidae	Gymnothorax pseudothyrsoideus	Highfin moray			Least concern	
Muraenidae	Gymnothorax undulatus	Undulate moray			Least concern	
Muraenesocidae	Muraenesox cinereus	Daggertooth pike-conger	Anqalise (Kingdom of Hejaz); Marmahie (Iran)	Minor fishe	Least concern	

=== Clupeiformes - Herrings ===
Family	Scientific name	Common name	Local name	Regional importance	Conservation status	Image
Clupeidae	Sardinella longiceps	Indian oilsardine	Moomagh (Kingdom of Hejaz)	Moderate fishery	Least concern	
Chirocentridae	Chirocentrus dorab	Dorab	Huf (Kingdom of Hejaz)	Minor fishery	Least concern	
Chirocentridae	Chirocentrus nudus	Whitefin wolfherring			Least concern	

=== Gonorhynchiformes ===
Family	Scientific name	Common name	Local name	Regional importance	Conservation status	Image
Chanidae	Chanos chanos	Milkfish		Moderate fishery	Least concern	

=== Siluriformes - Catfish ===
Family	Scientific name	Common name	Local name	Regional importance	Conservation status	Image
Plotosidae	Plotosus lineatus	Striped eelcatfish			Least concern	
Ariidae	Netuma bilineata	Brinze catfish		Minor fishing importance	Least concern	
Ariidae	Netuma thalassina	Giant catfish		Moderate fishery	Least concern	

=== Aulpiformes - Lizardfishes ===
Family	Scientific name	Common name	Local name	Regional importance	Conservation status	Image
Synodontidae	Saurida tumbil	Greater lizardfish	Hassoun (Iran)	Moderat fishery	Least concern	

=== Zeiformes - Dories ===
Family	Scientific name	Common name	Local name	Regional importance	Conservation status	Image
Zeidae	Zeus faber	John Dory			Data deficient	

=== Scombriformes - Mackerels and relatives ===
Family	Scientific name	Common name	Local name	Regional importance	Conservation status	Image
Stromateidae	Pampus argenteus	Silver pomphret or white pomfret	Zbeidy (Kingdom of Hejaz)	Widely fished, extirpated from many parts of the region	Not evaluated	
Scombridae	Euthynnus affinis	Kawakawa	Tabban (Kingdom of Hejaz)	Widely fished	Least concern	
Scombridae	Thunnus tonggol	Longtail tune	Joder (Kingdom of Hejaz)	Recreationally fished	Data deficient	
Scombridae	Rastrelliger kanagurta/chrysozonus	Indian longjaw mackerel		Moderate fishery	Least concern	
Scombridae	Scomberomorus commerson	Narrowbar Spanish mackerel	(Kingdom of Hejaz) Chanaad	Widely fished	Near threatened	
Trichiuridae	Trichiurus lepturus	Beltfish		Moderate fishery	Least concern	

=== Mullidae - Goatfish ===
Family	Scientific name	Common name	Local name	Regional importance	Conservation status	Image
Mullidae	Upeneus oligospilus		(Kingdom of Hejaz) Sultan Ibrahim	Minor fishery, endemic	Least concern	
Mullidae	Parupeneus margaritatus	Pearly goatfish	(Kingdom of Hejaz) Sultan Ibrahim	Minor fishery, endemic	Least concern	

=== Miscellaneous (Carangaria?) - Barracuda, threadfin, and moonfish ===
Family	Scientific name	Common name	Local name	Regional importance	Conservation status	Image
Sphyraenidae	Sphyraena barracuda	The great barracuda	(Kingdom of Hejaz) Jidd		Least concern	
Sphyraenidae	Sphyraena qenie	Blackfin barracuda	(Kingdom of Hejaz) Jidd	Moderate fishery	Least concern	
Sphyraenidae	Sphyraena jello	Pickhandle barracuda	(Kingdom of Hejaz) Jidd	Widely fished	Least concern	
Sphyraenidae	Sphyraena flavicauda	Yellowtail barracuda	(Kingdom of Hejaz) Jidd		Least concern	
Sphyraenidae	Sphyraena puntnamae	Military barracuda	(Kingdom of Hejaz) Jidd		Least concern	
Sphyraenidae	Sphyraena obtusata	Striped barracuda	(Kingdom of Hejaz) Jidd		Least concern	
Menidae	Mene maculata	Moonfish			Not evaluated	
Polynemidae	Eleutheronema tetradactylum	Fourfinger threadfin	(Kingdom of Hejaz) Sheim	Moderate fishery	Not evaluated	

=== Pleuronectoidei - Flatfish ===
Family	Scientific name	Common name	Local name	Regional importance	Conservation status	Image
Psettodidae	Psettodes erumei	Indian halibut		Minor fishery	Data deficient	
Bothidae	Bothus pantherinus	Leopard flounder			Least concern	
Cynoglossidae	Cynoglossus arel	Tonguesole	(Kingdom of Hejaz) Lsan	Widely fished	Least concern	

=== Carangiformes - Jacks, billfish, and allies ===
Family	Scientific name	Common name	Local name	Regional importance	Conservation status	Image
Carangidae	Caranx ignobilis	Giant trevally		Minor fishery	Least concern	
Carangidae	Caranx sexfasciatus	Bigeye trevally	(Kingdom of Hejaz) Hammam	moderately fished	Least concern	
Carangidae	Decapterus russelli	Indian scad		Moderate fishery	Least concern	
Carangidae	Gnathanodon speciosus	Golden trevally	Widely fished	Least concern		
Carangidae	Megalaspis cordyla	Torpedo scad		Moderate fishery	Least concern	
Carangidae	Parastromateus niger	Black pomfret		Minor fishery	Least concern	
Carangidae	Scomberoides commersonnianus	Giant queenfish	(Kingdom of Hejaz) Dhul'	Widely fished	Least concern	
Carangidae	Scomberoides tol	Needleskin queenfish		Minor fishery	Least concern	
Carangidae	Seriola dumerili	Great amberjack		Minor fishery	Least concern	
Carangidae	Seriolina nigrofasciata	blackband amberjack		Minor fishery	Least concern	
Carangidae	Trachurus indicus	Arabian scad			Vulnerable	
Echeneidae	Echeneis naucrates	Sharksucker			Least concern	
Rachycentridae	Rachycentron canadum	Cobia	(Iran) Saklah (Kingdom of Hejaz) Sakl	Widely fished	Least concern	Views from scientific centre Kuwait (14)
Coryphaenidae	Coryphaena hippurus	Mahi Mahi, or common dolphin fish	(Iran) Galit	Fished in Iran, not recorded in Arab fisheries	Least concern	
Istiophoridae	Istiompax indica	Black marlin			Data deficient	
Istiophoridae	Istiophorus platypterus	The sailfish	(Iran) Badban mahi		Vulnerable	

=== Cichlidae ===
Family	Scientific name	Common name	Local name	Regional importance	Conservation status	Image
Cichlidae	Oreochromis aureus	Blue tilapia		Introduced, found in wetlands and aquacultured	Least concern	
Cichlidae	Oreochromis niloticus	Nile tilapia	(Kingdom of Hejaz) Bultie	Introduced, found in wetlands and aquacultured	Least concern	

=== Atheriniformes - Silversides ===
Family	Scientific name	Common name	Local name	Regional importance	Conservation status	Image
Atherinidae	Atherinomorus lacunosus	Hardyhead silverside		Minor fishery	Least concern	

=== Pupfish ===
Family	Scientific name	Common name	Local name	Regional importance	Conservation status	Image
Cyprinodontidae	Aphaniops stoliczkanus	Arabian pupfish	(Kingdom of Hejaz) Ifti		Not evaluated	

=== Beloniformes - Needlefish, Halfbeaks, and Flyingfish ===
Family	Scientific name	Common name	Local name	Regional importance	Conservation status	Image
Belonidae	Ablennes hians	Flat needlefish			Least concern	
Belonidae	Platybelone platura	Flat needlefish			Least concern	
Belonidae	Strongylura leiurus	Slender longtom			Least concern	
Belonidae	Strongylura strongylura	Blackspot longtom			Least concern	
Belonidae	Tylosurus crocodilus	Houndfish	(Kingdom of Hejaz) Haquul	Moderate fishery	Least concern	
Belonidae	Tylosurus choram	Red Sea needlefish	(Kingdom of Hejaz) Haquul	Moderate fishery	Least concern	
Exocoetidae	Cypselurus oligolepis	Largescale flying fish			Least concern	
Exocoetidae	Paraexocoetus mento	African sailfin flying fish			Least concern	
Hemiramphidae	Hemiramphus marginatus	Yellowtip halfbeak			Least concern	
Hemiramphidae	Rhynchorhamphus georgii	Duckbill garfish			Least concern	

=== Mugilidae - Mullets ===
Family	Scientific name	Common name	Local name	Regional importance	Conservation status	Image
Mugilidae	Ellochelon vaigiensis	Squaretail mullet			Least concern	
Mugilidae	Mugil cephalus	Sea mullet	(Kingdom of Hejaz) Beeyah, or Buri	Widely fished	Least concern	
Mugilidae	Moolgarda seheli	Bluespot mullet			Least concern	
Mugilidae	Osteomugil cunnesius	Longarm mullet			Least concern	
Mugilidae	Planiliza abu	Abu mullet			Least concern	
Mugilidae	Planiliza carinata	Keelmullet			Least concern	
Mugilidae	Planiliza klunzingeri	Klunzingerian mullet	(Kingdom of Hejaz) Made	Widely fished	Least concern	
Mugilidae	Planiliza persica	Persian gulf mullet		Endemic	Data deficient	
Mugilidae	Planiliza planiceps	Tade grey mullet			Least concern	
Mugilidae	Planiliza subvirdis	Greenback mullet			Least concern	

=== Miscellaneous (Blenniformes?) - Damselfish ===
Family	Scientific name	Common name	Local name	Regional importance	Conservation status	Image
Pomacentridae	Abudefduf vaigiensis	Sargeant major	(Kingdom of Hejaz) Abu Dafdouf	Aquarium	Least concern	
Pomacentridae	Amphiprion clarkii	Yellowtail anemonefish		Aquarium	Least concern	
Pomacentridae	Chromis flavaxilla	Arabian chromis		Aquarium	Not evaluated	
Pomacentridae	Chromis xanthopterygia	Yellowfin chromis			Least concern	
Pomacentridae	Dascyllus trimaculatus	Threespot dascyllus			Least concern	
Pomacentridae	Neopomacentrus cyanomos	Royal demoiselle			Least concern	
Pomacentridae	Neopomacentrus sindensis	Arabian demoiselle			Least concern	
Pomacentridae	Pomacentrus aquilus	Dark damselfish			Least concern	
Pomacentridae	Pristotis obtusirostris	Persian gulf damsel			Least concern	

=== Acanthuriformes - Butterflyfish, surgeonfish, angelfish and allies ===
Family	Scientific name	Common name	Local name	Regional importance	Conservation status	Image
Lobotidae	Lobotes surinamensis	Tripletail			Least concern	
Pomacanthidae	Pomacanthus maculosus	Halfmoon angel	(Kingdom of Hejaz) Anfouzze	Moderately fished, for both aquarium trade and as a food fish	Least concern	
Drepaneidae	Drepane longimana	Concerine			Not evaluated	
Drepaneidae	Drepane punctata	Spotted sicklefish			Least concern	
Ephippidae	Ephippus orbis	Orbfish			Not evaluated	
Ephippidae	Platax orbicularis	Orbicular batfish			Least concern	
Ephippidae	Platax teira	Longfin batfish	(Kingdom of Hejaz) Imad	Minor fishery	Least concern	
Chaetodontidae	Chaetodon gardneri	Gardner's butterflyfish		Aquarium	Least concern	
Chaetodontidae	Chaetodon melapterus	Arabian butterflyfish		Aquarium	Least concern	
Chaetodontidae	Chaetodon nigropunctatus	Black butterflyfish		Aquarium	Least concern	
Chaetodontidae	Heniochus acuminatus	Longfin bannerfish		Aquarium	Least concern	
Leiognathidae	Karalla daura	Gold coin pony fish		Moderate fishery	Least concern	
Scatophagidae	Scatophagus argus	Spotted scat		Aquarium	Least concern	
Siganidae	Siganus sutor	Whitespotred rabbitfish	(Kingdom of Hejaz) Safi	Widely fished	Least concern	
Siganidae	Siganus javus	Streaked spinefoot	(Kingdom of Hejaz) Sneifi	Moderate fishery	Least concern	
Acanthuridae	Acanthurus sohal	Sohal	(Kingdom of Hejaz) Sohal	Minor fishery, for both aquarium and food fish	Least concern	
Acanthuridae	Zebrasoma xanthurum	Yellowtail tang		Aquarium	Least concern	

=== Tetraodontiformes - Pufferfish, filefish, sunfish and allies ===
Family	Scientific name	Common name	Local name	Regional importance	Conservation status	Image
Balistidae	Canthidermis macrolepis	Large-scale triggerfish			Not evaluated	
Balistidae	Odonus niger	Redtooth triggerfish			Least concern	
Balistidae	Rhinecanthus assasi	Picasso triggerfish			Least concern	
Molidae	Mola mola	Ocean sunfish			Vulnerable	
Molidae	Ranzania laevis	Slender sunny			Vulnerable	
Monacanthidae	Aluterus monoceros	Unicorn leatherjacket		Minor fishery	Least concern	
Monacanthidae	Paramonacanthus arabicus	Persian gulf filefish		Endemic species	Least concern	
Tetraodontidae	Arothron stellatus	Stellate pufferfish			Least concern	
Tetraodontidae	Chelonodontops patoca	Milkspotted pufferfish			Least concern	
Tetraodontidae	Lagocephalus guentheri	Diamondback pufferfish			Least concern	
Tetraodontidae	Lagocephalus lunaris	Lunate pufferfish			Least concern	

=== Centrarchiformes ===
Family	Scientific name	Common name	Local name	Regional importance	Conservation status	Image
Terapontidae	Terapon jarbua	Crescent grunter	(Kingdom of Hejaz) Dhiba/Yamyam	Minor fishery	Least concern	
Terapontidae	Terapon puta	Spinycheek grunter	(Kingdom of Hejaz) Zamrur	Minor fishery	Least concern	
Kyphosidae	Kyphosus cinerascens	Blue sea chub			Least concern	

=== Miscallaneous (Eupercaria?) - Snappers, sillagines, breams, grunts, silver buddies, and drums ===
Family	Scientific name	Common name	Local name	Regional importance	Conservation status	Image
Lutjanidae	Lutjanus argentimaculatus	Mangrove red snapper	(Kingdom of Hejaz) Nahhash	Moderate fishery	Least concern	
Lutjanidae	Lutjanus malabaricus	Saddletail snapper	(Kingdom of Hejaz) Hamra	Moderate fishery	Least concern	
Lutjanidae	Lutjanus ehrenbergii	Blackspot snapper		Moderate fishery	Least concern	
Lutjanidae	Lutjanus fulviflamma	Dory snapper		Moderate fishery	Least concern	
Gerreidae	Gerres oyena	Common silverbuddy	(Kingdom of Hejaz) Baddeh	Moderate fishery	Least concern	
Gerreidae	Pentaprion longimanus	Longfin mojarra			Least concern	
Gerreidae	Pentaprion longimanus	Longfin mojarra			Least concern	
Haemulidae	Plectorhinchus gaterinus	African grunt	(Kingdom of Hejaz) Farsh	minor fishery	Least concern	
Haemulidae	Plectorhinchus pictus	Trout sweetlips	(Kingdom of Hejaz) Yenma	minor fishery	Least concern	
Sparidae	Acanthopagrus arabicus	Arabian yellowfin bream	(Kingdom of Hejaz) Shaam	Moderate fishery	Least concern	
Sparidae	Acanthopagrus berda	Goldsilk bream	(Kingdom of Hejaz) Shaam	Moderate fishery	Least concern	
Sparidae	Acanthopagrus bifasciatus	Twobar bream	(Kingdom of Hejaz) Faskar	Widely fished	Least concern	
Sparidae	Acanthopagrus catenula	Bridled seabream			Data deficient	
Sparidae	Acanthopagrus sheim	Spotted yellowfin bream	(Kingdom of Hejaz)	Moderate fishery	Least concern	
Sparidae	Argyrops spinifer	King soldierbream	(Kingdom of Hejaz) Kofer	Moderate fishery	Least concern	
Sparidae	Diplodus omanensis (Note: Reported as subspecies Diplodus cervinus omanensis. It is sometimes considered a subspecies according to FishBase.)	Oman porgy			Least concern	
Sparidae	Rhabdosargus sarba	Tarwhine	(Kingdom of Hejaz) Jerjafan	Moderate fishery	Least concern	
Sparidae	Sparidentex hasta	Sobaity	(Kingdom of Hejaz) Sobaity	Moderate fishery	Least concern	
Lethrinidae	Lethrinus lentjan	Pinkear emperor		Widely fished	Least concern	
Lethrinidae	Lethrinus microdon	Smalltooth emperor		Widely fished	Least concern	
Lethrinidae	Lethrinus nebulosus	Spangler emperor	(Kingdom of Hejaz) Sherry	Widely fished	Least concern	
Nemipteridae	Scolopsis ghanam	Arabian monoclebream		Widely fished	Least concern	
Nemipteridae	Scolopsis taeniata	Black-streaked monocle bream			Not evaluated	
Sciaenidae	Otolithes ruber	Tigertooth croaker			Least concern	
Cepolidae	Acanthocepola abbreviata	Bandfish			Least concern	

=== Labriformes - Wrasses and Parrotfishes ===
Family	Scientific name	Common name	Local name	Regional importance	Conservation status	Image
Labridae	Cheilinus lunulatus	Broomtail wrasse			Least concern	
Labridae	Cheilinus trilobatus	Tripletail wrasse			Least concern	
Labridae	Choerodon robustus	Robust tuskfish		Moderately fished	Least concern	
Labridae	Labroides dimidiatus	Cleaner wrasse		Aquarium	Least concern	
Labridae	Thalassoma lunare	Moon wrasse		Aquarium	Least concern	
Scaridae	Chlorurus sordidus	Daisy parrotfish			Least concern	
Scaridae	Scarus ghobban	Bluebar parrotfish		minor fishery	Least concern	
Scaridae	Scarus persicus	Persian gulf parrotfish		minor fishery	Least concern	

=== Perchlike fish ===
Family	Scientific name	Common name	Local name	Regional importance	Conservation status	Image
Anthiadidae	Pseudanthias townsendi	Townsend's anthias		Aquarium	Least concern	
Epinephelidae	Aethaloperca rogaa	Redmouth grouper			Least concern	
Epinephelidae	Cephalopholis hemistiktos	Yellowfin hind	(Kingdom of Hejaz) Shneinwah	Moderate fishery	Least concern	
Epinephelidae	Epinephelus areolatus	Areolate grouper		Moderate fishery	Least concern	
Epinephelidae	Epinephelus bleekeri	Duskytail grouper		Moderate fishery	Data deficient	
Epinephelidae	Epinephelus coeruleopunctatus	Whitespotted grouper		Moderate fishery	Least concern	
Epinephelidae	Epinephelus coioides	Goldspotted rockcod	(Iran) (Kingdom of Hejaz) Hammour	Widely fished	Least concern	
Epinephelidae	Epinephelus latifasciatus	Dotted grouper		Moderate fishery	Least concern	
Epinephelidae	Epinephelus polylepis	Areolate grouper	(Kingdom of Hejaz) Summan	Widely fished	Least concern	
Scorpaenidae	Pterois miles	Military lionfish			Least concern	
Scorpaenidae	Pterois russelii	Plaintail lionfish			Least concern	
Scorpaenidae	Apistus carinatus	Ocellated waspfish			Least concern	
Platycephalidae	Platycephalus indicus	Bartail flathead	(Kingdom of Hejaz) Wahhar	Widely fished	Least concern	
