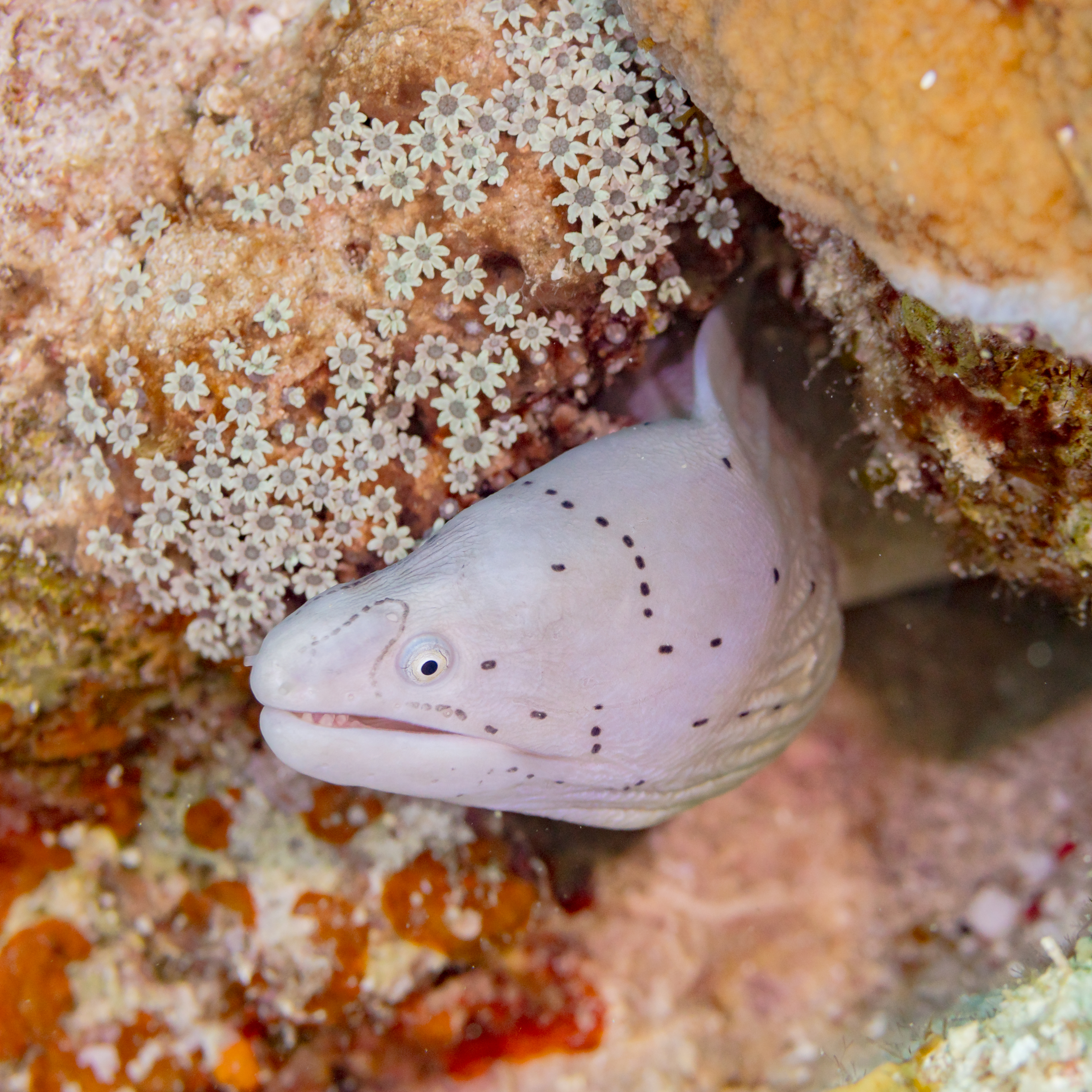
- An individual from Egypt (Red Sea)

Conservation status
- Least Concern (IUCN 3.1)

Scientific classification
- Kingdom: Animalia
- Phylum: Chordata
- Class: Actinopterygii
- Division: Teleostei
- Order: Anguilliformes
- Family: Muraenidae
- Genus: Gymnothorax
- Species: G. griseus

Binomial name
- Gymnothorax griseus (Lacépède, 1803)

Synonyms
- Siderea grisea

= Geometric moray =

Species of fish

The geometric moray (Gymnothorax griseus) is a moray eel of the family Muraenidae found throughout the western Indian Ocean at depths to 40 m. Its length is up to 65 cm. It is parasitized by Ichthyoxenus puhi, a species of isopod.

The fish is generally pale purple, white or brownish in colour, with a greyish head with distinct lines of black dots.

== Taxonomy ==
The geometric moray is a species of moray. The moray family (Muraenidae) is divided into two subfamilies: the snakemorays (subfamily:Uropterygiinae) and the typical morays (subfamily:Muraeninae). This species is classified within the latter due to having a dorsal fin in parts of the body where they wouldn't be in snakemorays. Within the subfamily, G. griseus is classified within the genus Gymnothorax, which contains over half of the species in the family.

=== Relatives ===
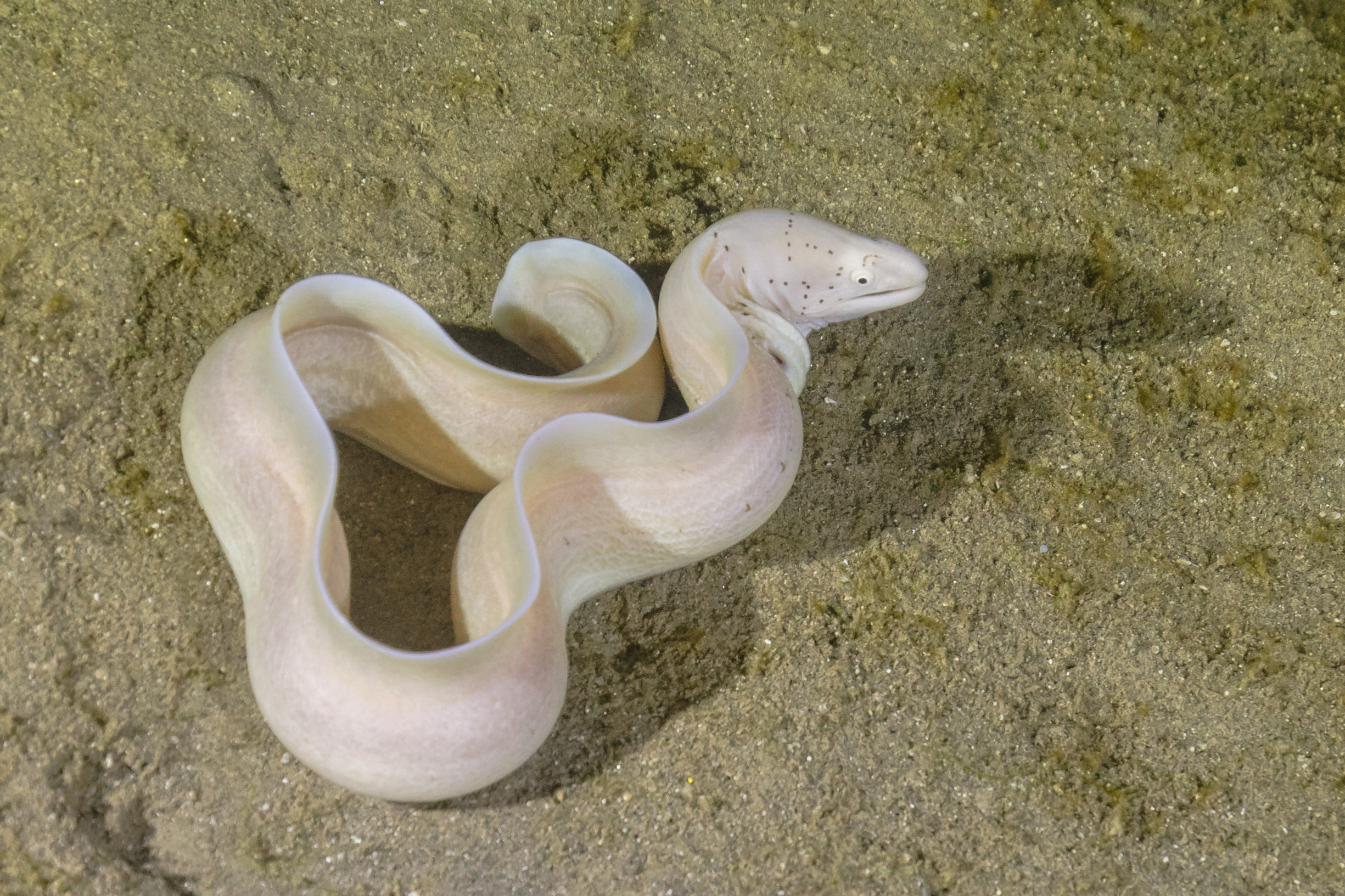
Full body view of a peppered moray in the Red Sea (Egypt)

This species' closest relative is the white-eyed moray (Gymnothorax thyrsoideus), which shares the common feature of white eyes; and also is not found in most places that G. griseus is in. The next closest relative to these two is Castle's moray (Gymnothorax castlei), which shares features with this species, such as having an almost identical pattern of spots, and having dots on the lateral line (griseus sometimes has the latter feature). More distant relatives include the False and Arabian false brown morays (Gymnothorax pseudoherrei & G. arabicus, respectively) and the Mottled moray (Echidna delicauta).
