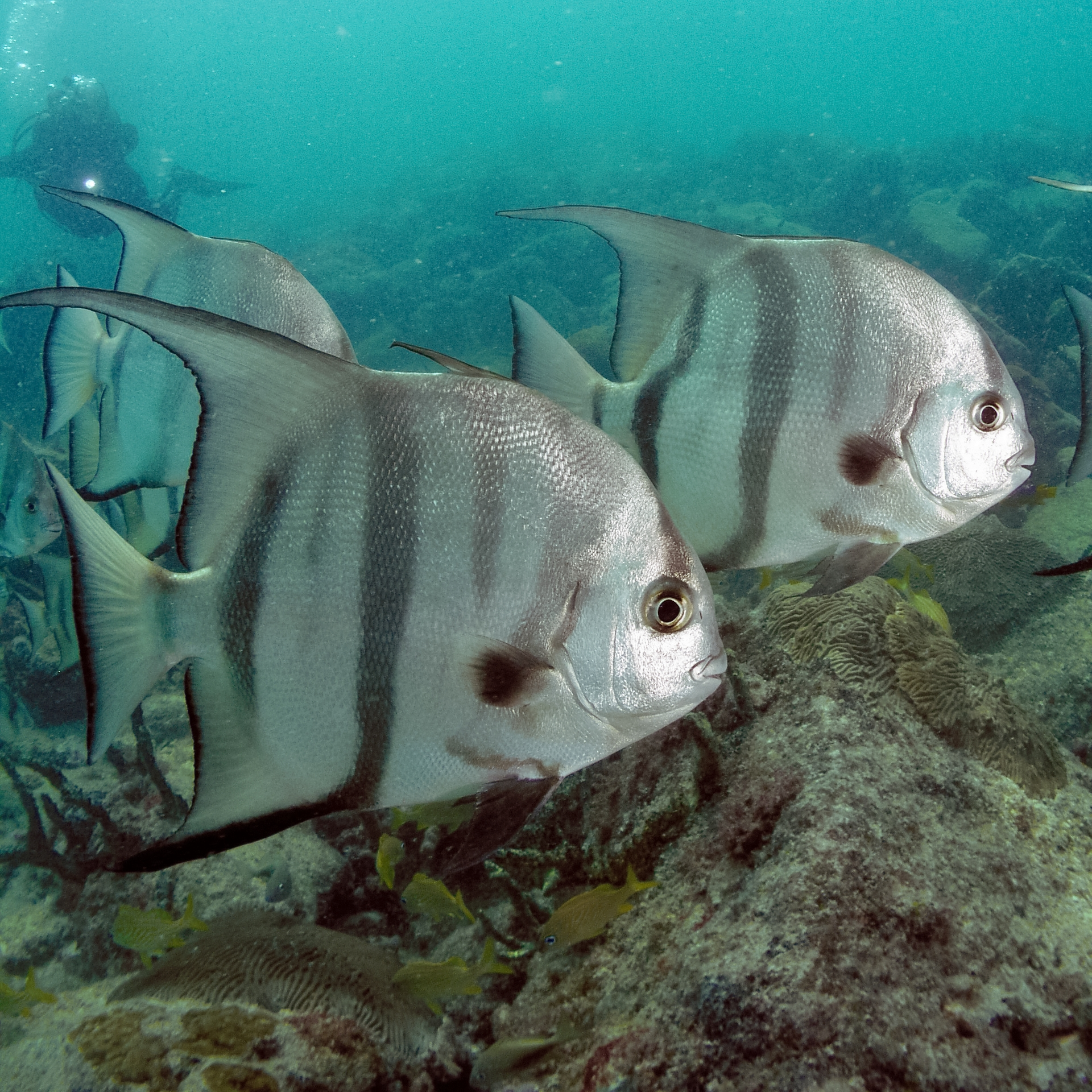

Conservation status
- Least Concern (IUCN 3.1)

Scientific classification
- Kingdom: Animalia
- Phylum: Chordata
- Class: Actinopterygii
- Division: Teleostei
- Order: Acanthuriformes
- Family: Ephippidae
- Genus: Chaetodipterus
- Species: C. faber

Binomial name
- Chaetodipterus faber (Broussonet, 1782)

Synonyms
- Chaetodon faber Broussonet, 1782; Ephippus gigas Cuvier, 1829; Chaetodon gigas (Cuvier, 1831); Chaetodon oviformis Mitchill, 1818; Chaetodon plumieri Bloch, 1787; Selene quadrangularis Lacépède, 1802; Zeus quadratus Bonnaterre, 1788

= Atlantic spadefish =

Species of fish

The Atlantic spadefish (Chaetodipterus faber) is a species of marine ray-finned fish belonging to the family Ephippidae, the spadefishes. It is the symbol of the North Carolina Aquariums.

== Taxonomy and etymology ==
The scientific name is derived from the Greek word "chaíti" meaning "mane" and "dipteros" meaning "with two fins." The Atlantic spadefish belongs to the genus Chaetodipterus, which includes two other species: the West African spadefish (Chaetodipterus lippei) and the Pacific spadefish (Chaetodipterus zonatus). The genus Chaetodipterus belongs to the family Ephippidae, which includes spadefish and batfish.

Chaetodipterus faber is known by numerous other colloquial names, including angelfish, white angelfish, threetailed porgy, ocean cobbler, and moonfish.

== Description ==
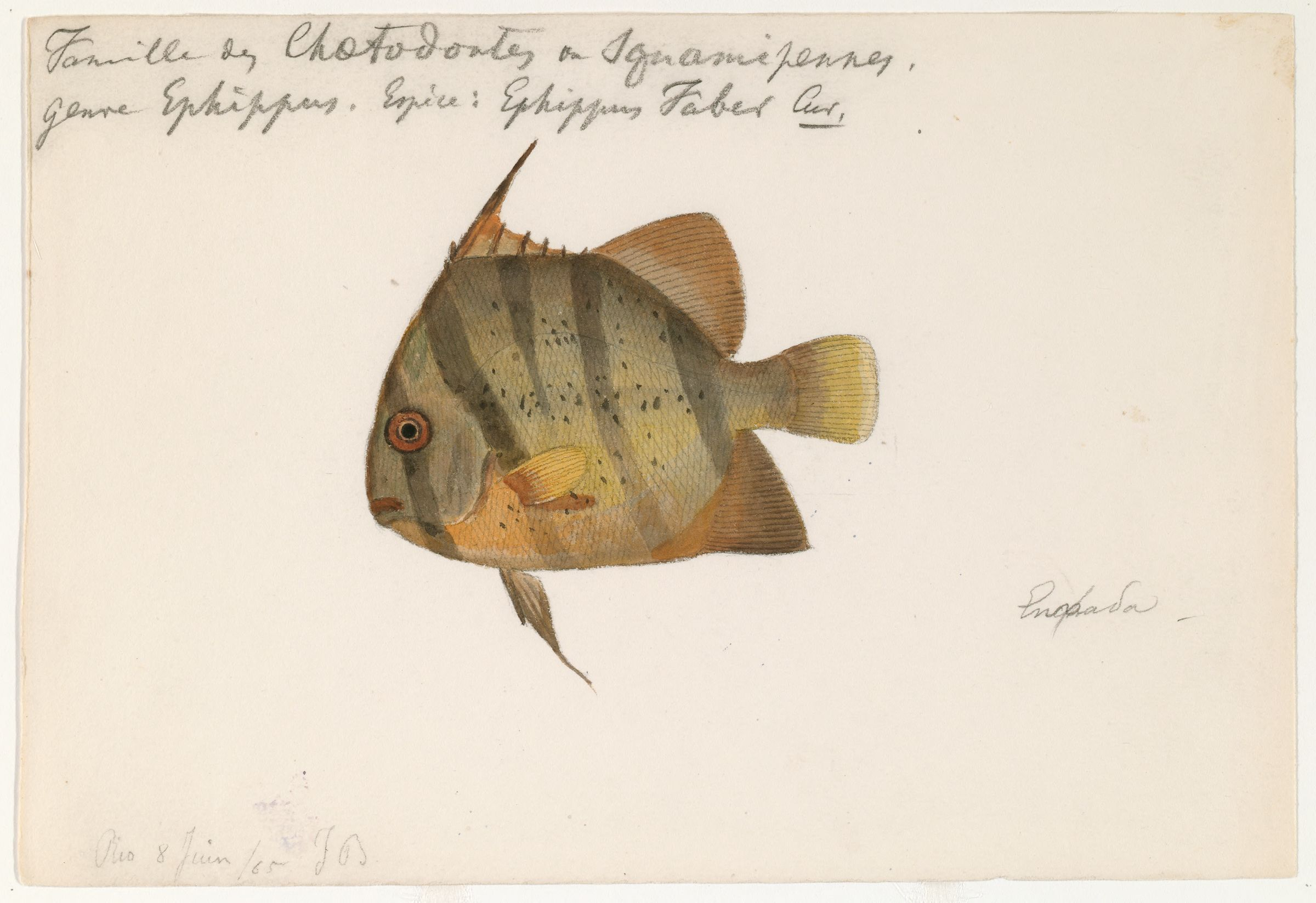
An 1865 watercolor painting of an Atlantic spadefish by Jacques Burkhardt

The disk-shaped body is very deep and compressed, and the snout is blunt. There are nine dorsal spines and 21–24 soft dorsal rays, and there are three anal spines and 17–19 anal rays. The second dorsal and anal fins of adults have long, trailing anterior lobes, giving an "angelfish-like" appearance. The body is silver in color with irregular black vertical bands that fade gradually with age. There are four to six black vertical bands on each side, with the first running through the eye and the last running through the caudal peduncle.

The mouth is small, with the maxilla of adults ending beneath the nostrils. The teeth are small and brushlike, and there are no teeth on the roof of the mouth. The head and fins are covered with ctenoid scales. Specimens commonly weigh from 3 to 10 pounds (1.4 to 4.5 kg), although individuals as large as 20 pounds (9.1 kg) have been recorded. Their maximum length is about 36 inches (91 cm).

== Diet ==
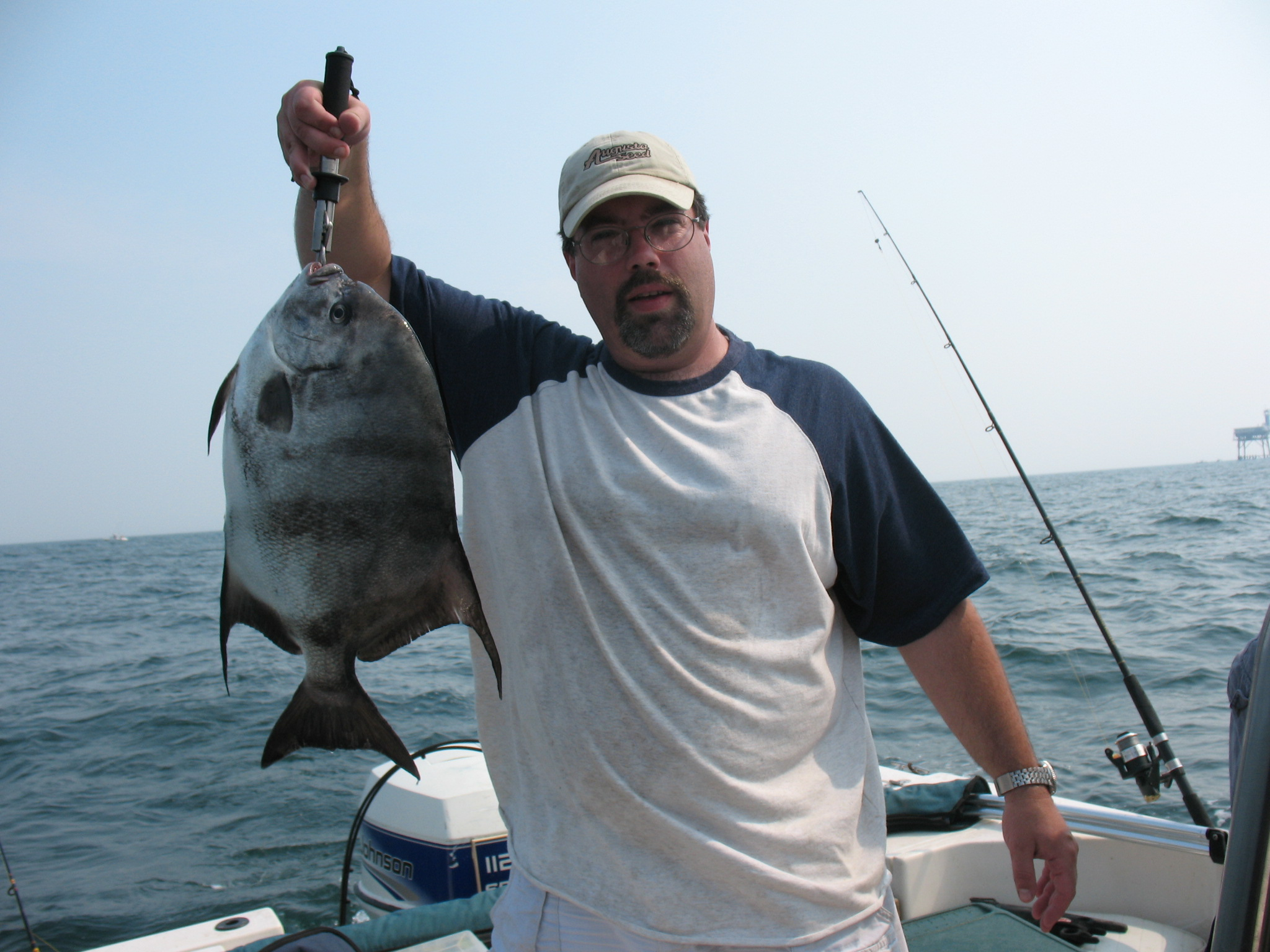
A large Atlantic spadefish caught off the coast of Virginia

Atlantic spadefish feed on small, benthic invertebrates including crustaceans, mollusks, annelids, and cnidarians. They also feed on plankton in the water column.

== Distribution and habitat ==
The species is endemic to the western Atlantic Ocean. They are found off the coast of the southeastern United States as far north as Massachusetts, the Gulf of Mexico, and in the Caribbean. They are also found in Bermuda and the eastern coast of Brazil.

The fish inhabits marine and brackish waters typically in subtropical climates. They are common in shallow waters along coastlines with depths of 3–35 metres (9.8–114.8 ft). Juveniles commonly inhabit estuaries until maturity and adults prefer mangroves, beaches, and harbors.

== Reproduction and life cycle ==
Spawning season occurs from May to September. A female can release up to one million eggs per season. The eggs hatch after 24 hours and the larvae feed on a yolk for two days before actively feeding.

== Importance to humans ==
Atlantic spadefish are not of much commercial value. Due to their reputation as strong fighters, they are popular game fish, especially during the summer months when they are most active. The Atlantic spadefish has become a popular target species for sportfishermen due to their abundance and the strong fight they have for their size. They are good table fare, especially if smoked or grilled. A common method of catching involves using small pieces of clam on a small circle hook.

== See also ==
- Ephippidae
- Pacific spadefish
- Chaetodipterus
- Angelfish (disambiguation)
- Recreational fishing
