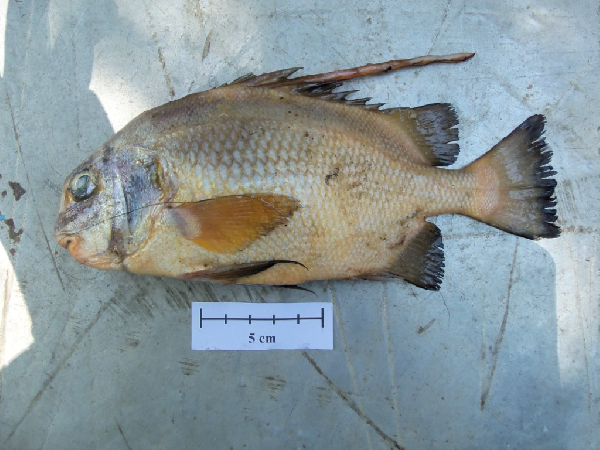

Scientific classification
- Kingdom: Animalia
- Phylum: Chordata
- Class: Actinopterygii
- Order: Acanthuriformes
- Family: Ephippidae
- Genus: Proteracanthus; Günther, 1859
- Species: P. sarissophorus

Binomial name
- Proteracanthus sarissophorus (Cantor, 1849)

Synonyms
- Crenidens sarissophorus Cantor, 1849; Girella sarissophorus (Cantor, 1849)

= Proteracanthus =

Genus of fishes

Proteracanthus is a monospecific genus of marine ray-finned fish belonging to the family Ephippidae, the spadefishes and batfishes. The only species in the genus is Proeracanthus sarissophorus which occurs in coral reefs around Malaysia, Borneo, and Sumatra. This species is also known as the harpoon spadefish, or in Malaysia as drummer, knightfish, rudderfish or sea chub. This species grows to a length of 32.5 centimetres (12.8 in) SL.

== Taxonomy ==
Proteracanthus was first proposed as a monospecific genus in 1859 by the German-born British herpetologist and ichthyologist Albert Günther. Its only species was Crenidens sassiphorus which had been described in 1849 by the Danish zoologist Theodore Edward Cantor with its type locality given as the Sea of Penang in Malaya. This taxon belongs to the family Ephippidae in the order Moroniformes.

== Etymology ==
Proteracanthus is a combination of proteros, meaning “before” or “earlier”, with acanthus, a “spine” or “thorn”. This is a reference to the horizontal spine in front of the dorsal fin. The specific name combines sarissa, a “pike”, with phorus, meaning “to bear”, an allusion to the elongated fourth spine of the dorsal fin.
