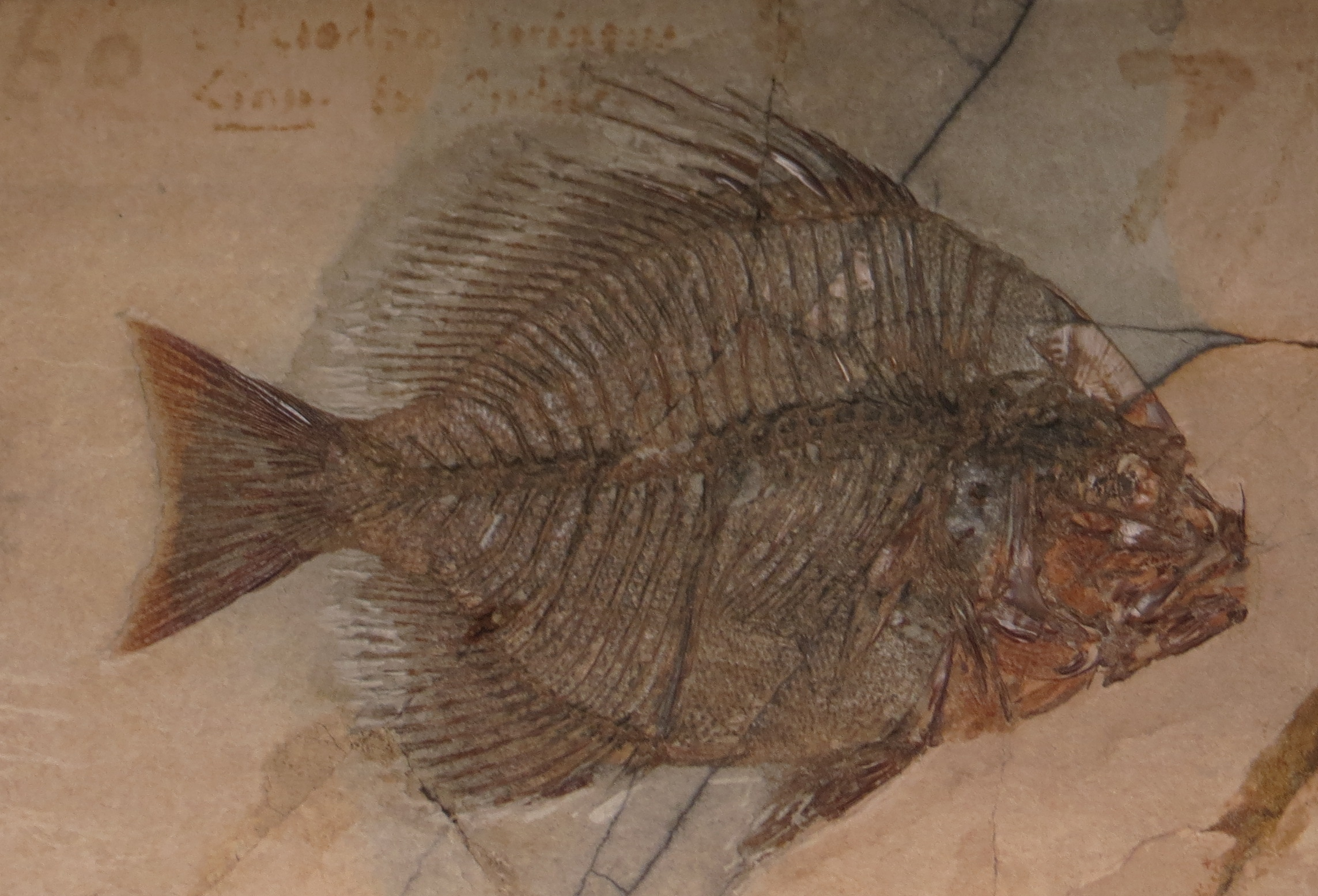
- Specimen of A. asper

Scientific classification
- Kingdom: Animalia
- Phylum: Chordata
- Class: Actinopterygii
- Order: Acanthuriformes
- Family: Ephippidae
- Genus: †Archaephippus; Blot, 1969
- Species: †A. asper

Binomial name
- †Archaephippus asper (Volta, 1796)

Synonyms
- Chaetodon asper Volta, 1796; Chaetodon substriatus de Blainville, 1818; Ephippus oblongus Agassiz, 1835

= Archaephippus =

Archaephippus Temporal range: Early Eocene

Extinct genus of fishes

Archaephippus ("ancient Ephippus") is an extinct genus of prehistoric spadefish that lived from the early Eocene. It contains a single species, A. asper, known from Italy. Several exquisitely preserved fossils have been found from the Monte Bolca lagerstatten. Some juvenile specimens preserve the vertical striped coloration that they would have likely had in life.

It was originally described as Chaetodon asper Volta, 1796, which was given the new name Ephippus oblongus by Agassiz (1835). When it was placed in its own genus, the original specific epithet was revived.

== See also ==
- Prehistoric fish
- List of prehistoric bony fish
