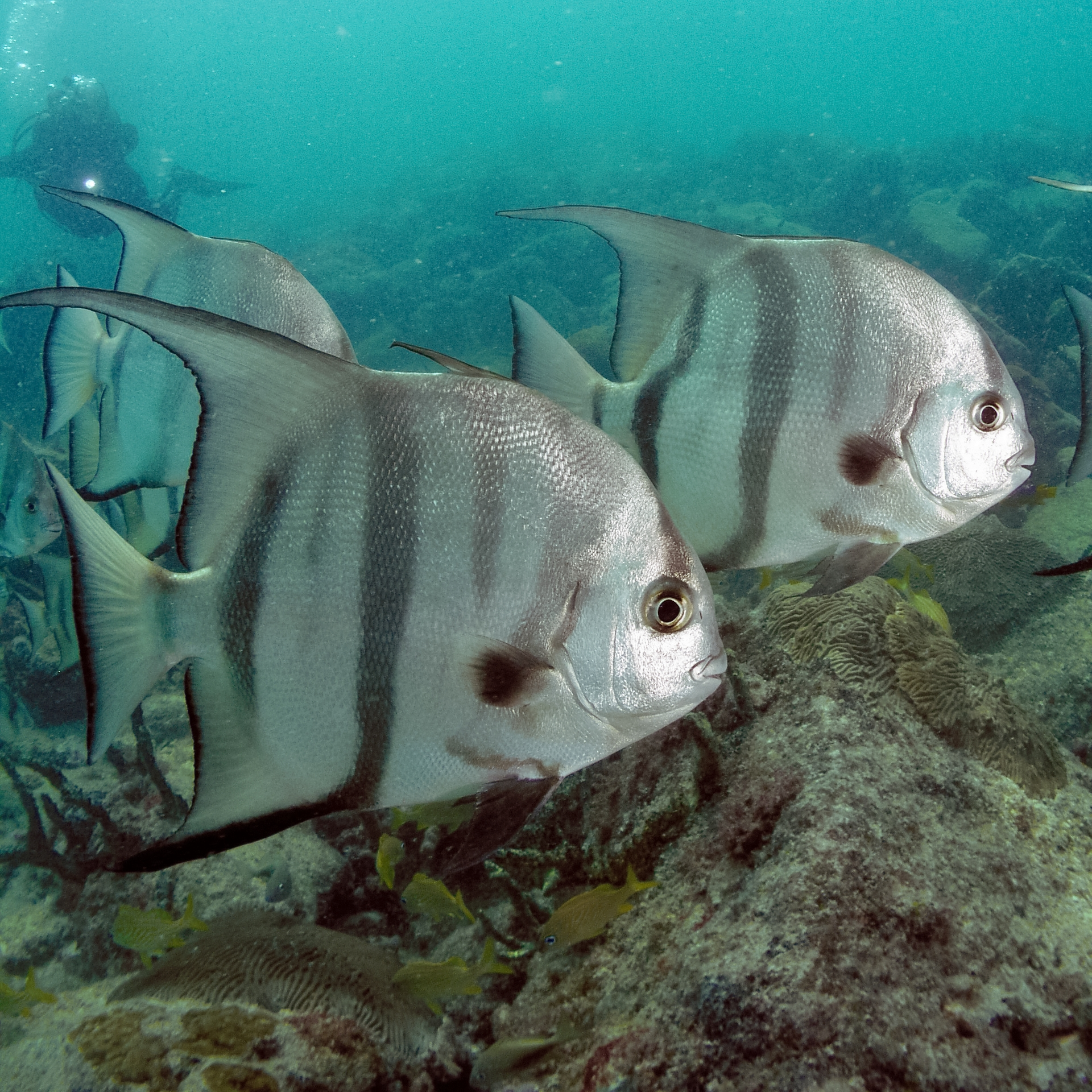
- Atlantic spadefish

Scientific classification
- Kingdom: Animalia
- Phylum: Chordata
- Class: Actinopterygii
- Order: Acanthuriformes
- Family: Ephippidae
- Genus: Chaetodipterus; Lacépède, 1802

Type species
- Chaetodon plumieri Bloch, 1787

Synonyms
- Parephippus Gill, 1861

= Chaetodipterus =

Genus of fishes

Chaetodipterus is a genus of marine ray-finned fishes belonging to the family Ephippidae, the spadefishes. These fishes are found in the Atlantic and eastern Pacific Oceans.

== Taxonomy ==
Chaetodipterus was first proposed as a monospecific genus in 1802 by the French naturalist Bernard Germain de Lacépède with Chaetodon plumieri, a species described by Marcus Elieser Bloch on 1787 from Jamaica, as its only species. Chaetodon plumieri is a synonym of Chaetodipterus faber. This genus is classified within the family Ephippidae which is in the order Moroniformes.

== Etymology ==
Chaetodipterus is a combination of di, meaning "two", and pterus, meaning "fin", prefixed with Chaetodon. This is a reference to the original genus the type species was assigned to but with a split dorsal fin.

== Species ==
Chaetodipterus contains three recognized species:

- Chaetodipterus faber (Broussonet, 1782) (Atlantic spadefish)
- Chaetodipterus lippei Steindachner, 1895 (West African spadefish)
- Chaetodipterus zonatus (Girard, 1858) (Pacific spadefish)

== Characteristics ==
Chaetodipterus spadefishes have a highly compressed disc shaped body with a blunt snout and a small terminal mouth which bands of brush like teeth in its jaws. They have a continuous dorsal fin with 9 low, well developed spines and between 18 and 23 soft rays. The spiny part of the dorsal fin is separated from the soft rays part by a deep incision. The anal fin is supported by 3 spines and 16 to 20 soft rays. The front portions of the soft dorsal fin and anal fin are elongated. The pectoral fins are short while the long pelvic fins sit under these. The caudal fin is slightly concave. The head body and most of the fins are covered in scales and the lateral line is complete. The largest species is the Atlantic spadefish, with a maximum published total length of 91 cm (36 in) while the smallest is the West African spadefish, which has a maximum published total length of 31 cm (12 in).

== Distribution ==
Chaetodipterus comprises three allopatric species, the Atlantic spadefish in the western Atlantic, the West African spadefish in the eastern Atlantic and the Pacific spadefish in the eastern Pacific.
