= Ephippus =

Ephippus or Ephippos may refer to:

- Ephippus of Olynthus, ancient Greek historian of Alexander the Great
- Ephippus of Athens, ancient Greek comic poet
- Ephippus (fish), a fish genus
