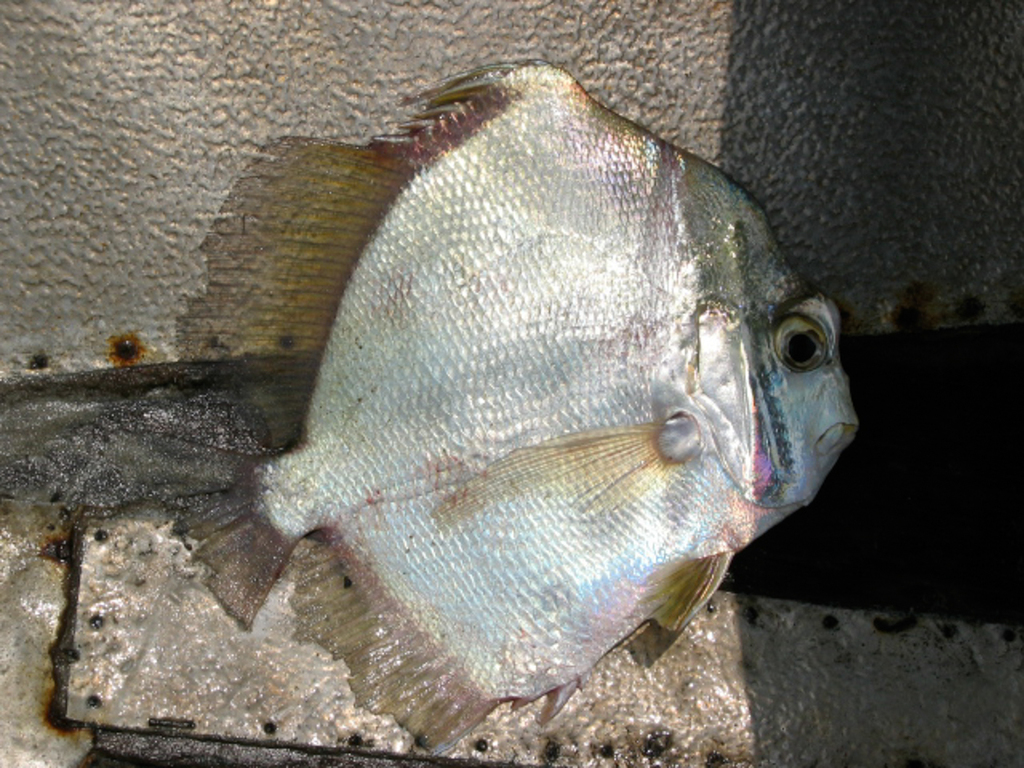

Conservation status
- Least Concern (IUCN 3.1)

Scientific classification
- Kingdom: Animalia
- Phylum: Chordata
- Class: Actinopterygii
- Division: Teleostei
- Order: Acanthuriformes
- Family: Drepaneidae
- Genus: Drepane
- Species: D. africana

Binomial name
- Drepane africana Osório, 1892

Synonyms
- Drepane punctata africana Osório, 1892; Cryptosmilia luna Cope, 1867; Drepane punctata octofasciata Pellegrin, 1905

= African sicklefish =

Species of fish

The African sicklefish (Drepane africana) is a species of ray-finned fish belonging to the family Drepaneidae, the sicklefishes. This fish is found in the costal waters of the eastern Atlantic Ocean from the Canary Islands and Mauritania south to Angola, including the Cape Verde Islands and the islands of the Gulf of Guinea. It is a coastal species found over sandy and muddy bottoms between depths of 10 and 75 m (33 and 246 ft), moving into coastal lagoons at sexual maturity.

== Taxonomy ==
The African sicklefish was first formally described as Drepane punctata africana in 1892 by the Portuguese ichthyologist and carcinologist Balthazar Osório with its type locality given as the west coasts of the islands of São Tomé and Príncipe, the two islands which make up the nation of São Tomé and Príncipe. It is one of three species in the genus Drepane, the only genus in the monogeneric family Drepaneidae which is classified in the order Moroniformes.

== Description ==
The African sicklefish has a deep and strongly compressed body, with the front of the body having a steep, slope to the origin of the dorsal fin. It has a small head with a short snout and a small fleshy-lipped, terminal mouth which is highly protrusible. The teeth are thin and sharp and are arranged in bands in the upper jaw with no teeth in the roof of the mouth. There is a deep incision in the dorsal fin, that fin being supported by 8 or 9 spines and 17 or 18 soft rays, the first forward-pointing spine being very small and visible only in very young fish. The anal fin is supported by 3 spines and 20 or 21 soft rays. The pectoral fins are sickle-shaped and extend almost as far as the base of the slightly rounded caudal fin. The pelvic fins are located on the thorax. The fine scales are ctenoid and cover the body, the bases of dorsal and anal fins and head, apart from the snout and preoperculum. The margin of the preoperculum is serrated. They have a lateral line which shows a strong arch. The overall colour is silvery grey darker on the upper body and nearly white on the belly. There is a series of 8 brown, rather indistinct vertical bars, fading with age, on the flanks. The African sicklefish reaches a maximum published total length of 45 cm (18 in).

== Distribution and habitat ==
The African sicklefish is found along the western coast of Africa from the Canary Islands and Mauritania in the north south to Angola, including the Cape Verde Islands. It is found at depths of 20 to 50 m (66 to 164 ft), is a neritic, coastal fish which is found in lagoon and estuarine habitats over sandy and muddy bottoms.

== Biology ==
The African sicklefish breeds in estuaries, but not exclusively, although juveniles have not been confirmed as occurring in other habitats. Its diet comprises bivalves and gastropods, as well as fish eggs and detritus. It is often gregarious, and found in schools.

== Utilisation ==
The African sicklefish is commercially fished for human consumption using Bottom trawling, beach seines and purse seines, and it is frequently caught as bycatch in the Gambian trawl fishery targeting shrimp.
