= Panama spadefish =

Conservation status
- Least Concern (IUCN 3.1)

Scientific classification
- Kingdom: Animalia
- Phylum: Chordata
- Class: Actinopterygii
- Order: Acanthuriformes
- Family: Ephippidae
- Genus: Parapsettus; Steindachner, 1876
- Species: P. panamensis

Binomial name
- Parapsettus panamensis (Steindachner, 1876)

Synonyms
- Psettus panamensis Steindachner, 1876

Species of fish

The Panama spadefish (Parapsettus panamensis) is a species of marine ray-finned fish belonging to the family Ephippidae, the spadefishes. This species is found in the Pacific coast of the Americas from the Gulf of California to Peru. This species grows to a length of 30 centimetres (12 in) TL though most do not exceed 20 centimetres (7.9 in) TL. The Panama spadefishes is the only known member of the monospecific genus Parapsettus.
