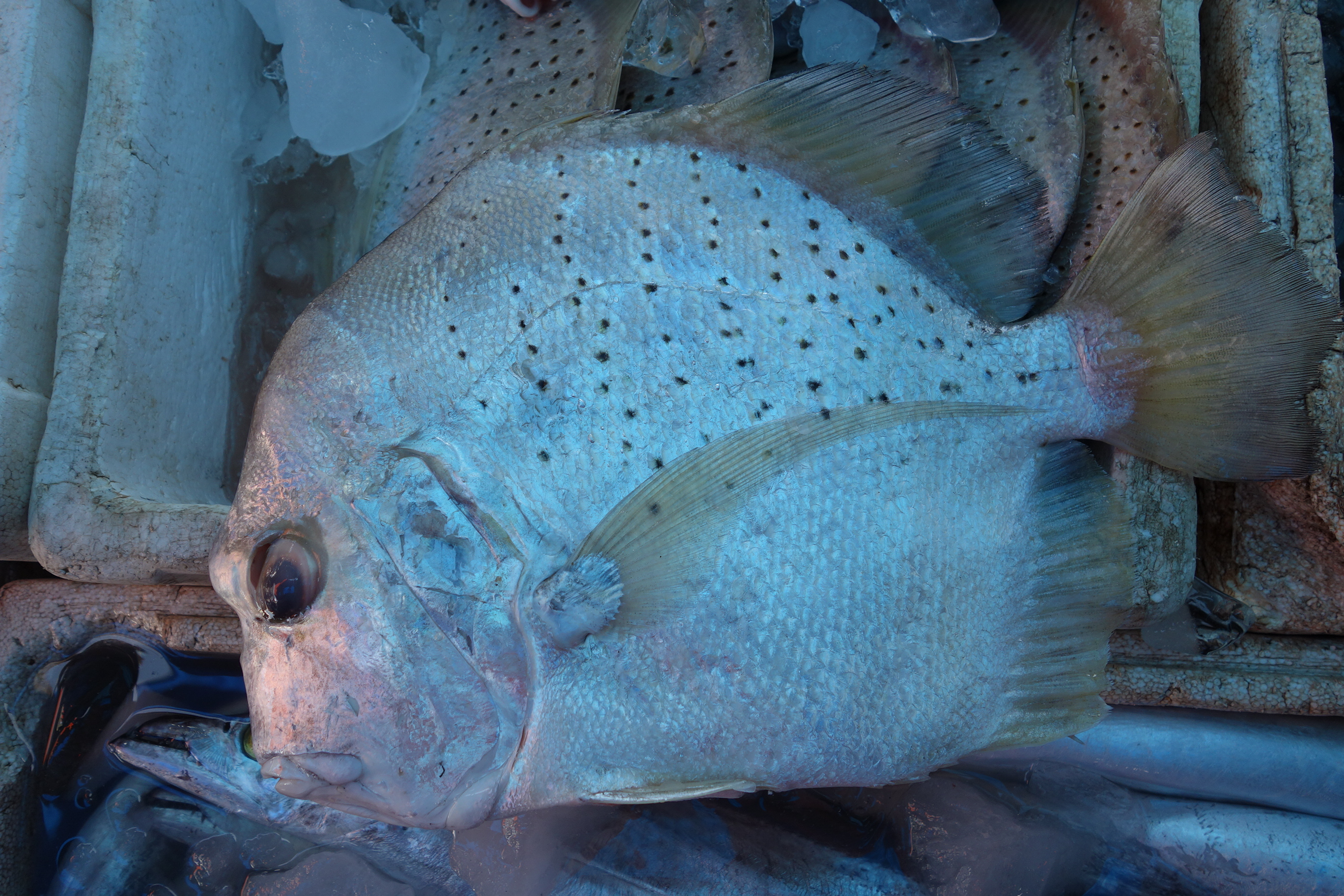

Scientific classification
- Kingdom: Animalia
- Phylum: Chordata
- Class: Actinopterygii
- Division: Teleostei
- Order: Acanthuriformes
- Family: Drepaneidae
- Genus: Drepane
- Species: D. punctata

Binomial name
- Drepane punctata (Linnaeus, 1758)

Synonyms
- Chaetodon punctatus Linnaeus, 1758; Drepane punctatus (Linnaeus, 1758); Drepanichthys punctatus (Linnaeus, 1758); Harpochirus punctatus (Linnaeus, 1758)

= Drepane punctata =

Species of fish

Drepane punctata, the butterfish, concertinafish, jetto, peppercorn, sickle-fish, silver moonfish, spotted batfish, spotted sicklefish, sicklefish or spotted spadefish, is a species of ray-finned fish belonging to the family Drepaneidae, the sicklefishes. This fish is found in the Indo-Pacific.

== Taxonomy ==
Drepane punctata was first formally described as Chaetodon punctatus in the 10th edition of Systema Naturae by Linnaeus with its type locality given as "Asia". In 1917 David Starr Jordan designated C. punctatus as the type species of the genus Drepane which had been proposed by Georges Cuvier in 1831. It is one of three species in the genus Drepane, the only genus in the monogeneric family Drepaneidae which is classified in the order Moroniformes.

== Description ==
Drepane punctata has an oval shaped, deeply compressed body which has a depth greater than its standard length. The snout has a straight or concave profile with no scales on the snout, cheeks and preoperculum. The lower edge of the preoperculum is serrated. It has a fringe of cirrhi on the chin. It has a highly protrusible mouth and forms a ventrally facing tube when extended. There are bands of thin, pointed teeth on the jaws with none on the roof of the mouth. The dorsal fin is supported by between 8 and 10, typically 9, spines and 20 to 22 soft rays while the anal fin has 3 spines and between 16 and 19 soft rays. The caudal fin is rounded rounded or nearly truncate in larger adults). The long pectoral fin are sickle-shaped and extend as far as the caudal peduncle. There is a bump or bony knob between the eyes. The head and body silvery in colour with a 5 to 10 series of black spots arranged in vertical lines on the upper body. The fins are dusky yellow with the dorsal and caudal fins being darker towards their margins and there are 2 or 3 horizontal rows of dark dots, 1 dot each part of the membrane between the soft rays. This species has a maximum published total length of 50 cm (20 in), although 25 cm (9.8 in) is more typical.

== Distribution and habitat ==
Drepane punctata is found in the tropical and temperate Indo-West Pacific from to India east through Indonesia, Philippines and New Guinea, north to Taiwan and Japan and south to northern Australia. It occurs at depths between 10 and 49 m (33 and 161 ft) in coastal waters over sand or mud bottoms in reefs, estuaries and in harbours.
