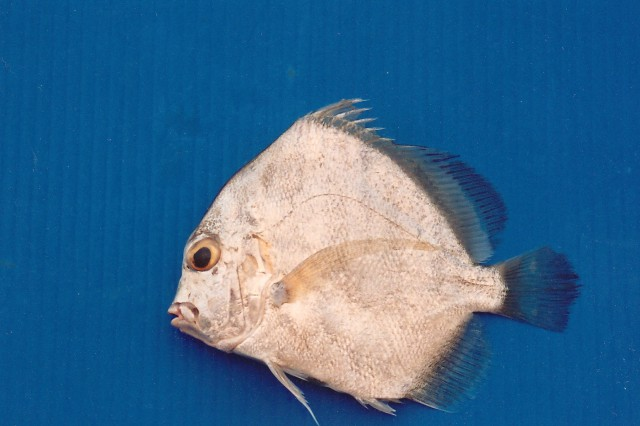

Scientific classification
- Kingdom: Animalia
- Phylum: Chordata
- Class: Actinopterygii
- Order: Acanthuriformes
- Family: Drepaneidae
- Genus: Drepane
- Species: D. longimana

Binomial name
- Drepane longimana (Bloch & Schneider, 1801)

Synonyms
- Chaetodon longimanus Bloch & Schneider, 1801; Drepane longimanus (Bloch & Schneider, 1801)

= Drepane longimana =

Species of fish

Drepane longimana, commonly known as the concertina fish, barred sicklefish, or banded sicklefish, is a fish native to the Indo-Pacific and northern Australia.

== Taxonomy ==
Drepane longimana was first formally described as Chaetodon longimanus in 1801 by the German naturalists Marcus Elieser Bloch and Johann Gottlob Theaenus Schneider with its type locality given as Tranquebar in India. It is one of the three species in the genus Drepane – the only genus in the monogeneric family Drepaneidae, which is classified in the order Moroniformes. The specific name longimana means “long handed” and is a reference to the long sickle-shaped pectoral fins which reach the caudal peduncle.

== Description ==
Drepane longimana has an oval shaped, strongly compressed body with a depth of 120% to 130% of its standard length. The snout has a straight or concave profile with no scales on the snout, cheeks and preoperculum. The lower edge of the preoperculum is serrated. It has a fringe of cirrhi on the chin. It has a highly protrusible mouth and forms a ventrally facing tube when extended. The dorsal fin is supported by between 7 and 9, typically 8, spines and 19 to 23 soft rays while the anal fin has 3 spines and between 17 and 19 soft rays. The caudal fin is rounded or nearly truncate in larger adults. The long pectoral fins are sickle-shaped and extend as far as the caudal peduncle. The head and body are silvery in colour, marked between 4 and 10, with near vertical dark bars on the upper body from the head to the caudal peduncle. The dorsal, anal and caudal fins are dusky, darker on the margins. There are 2 or 3 rows of dark spots on the soft rayed part of the dorsal fins, the spots located on the fin membranes between the rays. This species has a maximum published total length of 50 cm (20 in), although 20 cm (7.9 in) is more typical.

== Distribution and habitat ==
Drepane longimana is found in the Indo-Pacific from the Red Sea and eastern coast of Africa east to New Guinea and northern Australia and north to Taiwan and Japan. The concertinafish is found in coastal areas over sand and mud substrates in reefs, harbours and estuaries.
