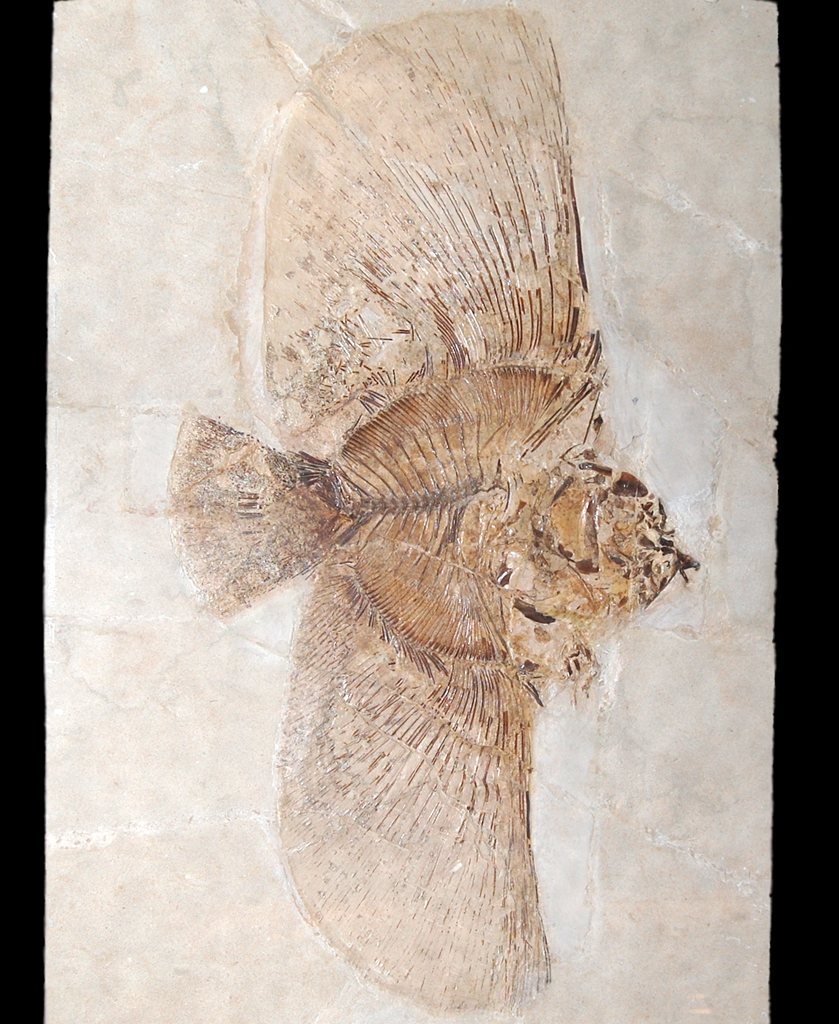
- Fossil specimen, Natural History Museum, Vienna

Scientific classification
- Domain: Eukaryota
- Kingdom: Animalia
- Phylum: Chordata
- Class: Actinopterygii
- Order: Acanthuriformes
- Family: Ephippidae
- Genus: †Eoplatax; Blot, 1969
- Species: †E. papilio

Binomial name
- †Eoplatax papilio (Volta, 1796)

Synonyms
- Chaetodon papilio Volta, 1796; Chaetodon subvespertilio de Blainville, 1818

= Eoplatax =

Eoplatax Temporal range: Early Eocene

Extinct genus of fishes

Eoplatax ("dawn Platax") is an extinct genus of prehistoric spadefish that lived during the Early Eocene. It contains a single species, E. papilio (=E. subvespertilio (de Blainville, 1818)), from the Ypresian-aged Monte Bolca site of Italy. As its name suggests are closely allied to the extant genus, Platax, more commonly known as "batfish."

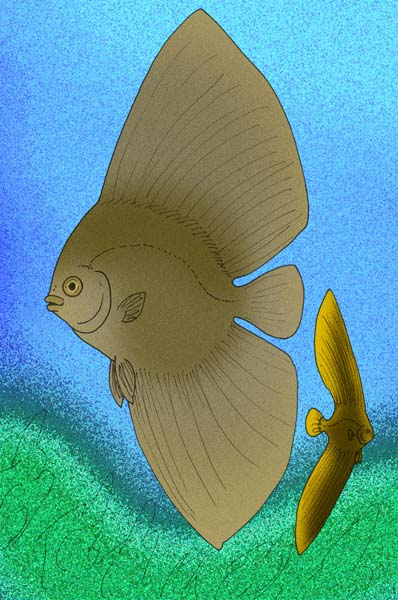
Reconstruction of E. papillio

It was initially described as Chaetodon papilio by Volta (1796) before being moved to Platax by Agassiz (1835). Due to its differences from Platax, it was moved to its own genus, Eoplatax, in 1969.

== See also ==
- Prehistoric fish
- List of prehistoric bony fish
