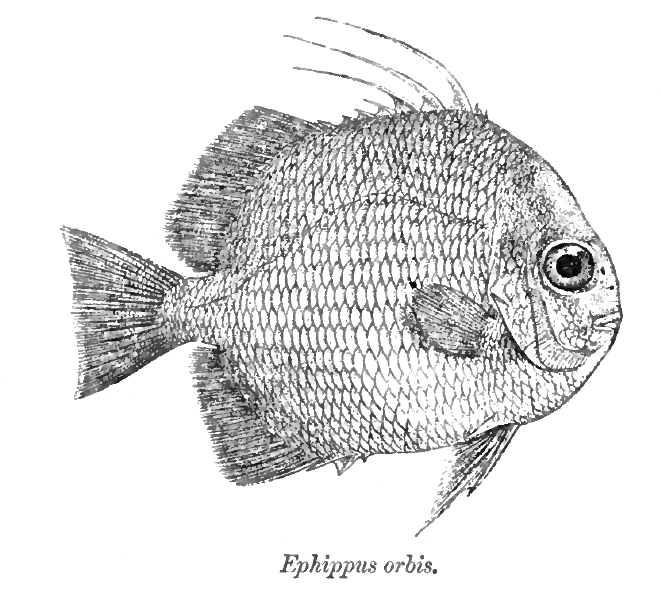
- Ephippus orbis as illustrated by Francis Day in The Fauna of British India

Conservation status
- Least Concern (IUCN 3.1) (Persian Gulf regional assessment)

Scientific classification
- Kingdom: Animalia
- Phylum: Chordata
- Class: Actinopterygii
- Order: Acanthuriformes
- Family: Ephippidae
- Genus: Ephippus
- Species: E. orbis

Binomial name
- Ephippus orbis (Bloch, 1787)

Synonyms
- Chaetodon orbis Bloch, 1787; Ephippeus orbis (Bloch, 1787); Epippus orbis (Bloch, 1787)

= Ephippus orbis =

Species of fish

Ephippus orbis, commonly known as the orbfish or orbiculate spadefish, is a species of marine fish in the family Ephippidae native to the shallow waters of the Indo-West Pacific region.

== Distribution and habitat ==
Native to the Indo-West Pacific region, Ephippus orbis can be found in the Gulf of Oman and the Persian Gulf (including the waters of Bahrain, Iran, Iraq, Kuwait, Qatar, Saudi Arabia, and the United Arab Emirates), the Indian Ocean (including the waters of East Africa as far south as South Africa and eastward to India, Indonesia, and Sri Lanka), and the western Pacific Ocean (including the waters of northern Australia, China, southern Japan, Myanmar, the Philippines, and Taiwan).

Ephippus orbis inhabits shallow coastal waters and estuaries at depths of 10–30 m (33–98 ft) and is sometimes associated with coral reefs.

== Description ==
Ephippus orbis is a silvery blue-green fish with a compressed, orbicular body and dark fins, growing up to 25 cm (9.8 in) total length. The body may be uniform in colour or marked with four to five dark, narrow bars. The snout is short and steep with a small mouth. The dorsal fin has nine to ten spines (with spines two to five being elongated) and nineteen to twenty rays, with deep indentations in the fin membrane between each spine and where the spines meet the soft rays. The anal fin has three spines and fourteen to seventeen rays, and each pectoral fin has nineteen to twenty rays.

== Ecology ==
Ephippus orbis is known to feed on benthic fish and invertebrates.
