= Threadfin scat =

Scientific classification
- Domain: Eukaryota
- Kingdom: Animalia
- Phylum: Chordata
- Class: Actinopterygii
- Order: Acanthuriformes
- Family: Ephippidae
- Genus: Rhinoprenes; Munro, 1964
- Species: R. pentanemus

Binomial name
- Rhinoprenes pentanemus Munro, 1964

Species of fish

The Threadfin scat (Rhinoprenes pentanemus) is a species of ephippid native to the Pacific Ocean around Papua New Guinea and Australia. This fish eats algae and also sewage. This species grows to a length of 15 centimetres (5.9 in) TL. This species is the only known member of the genus Rhinoprenes.
