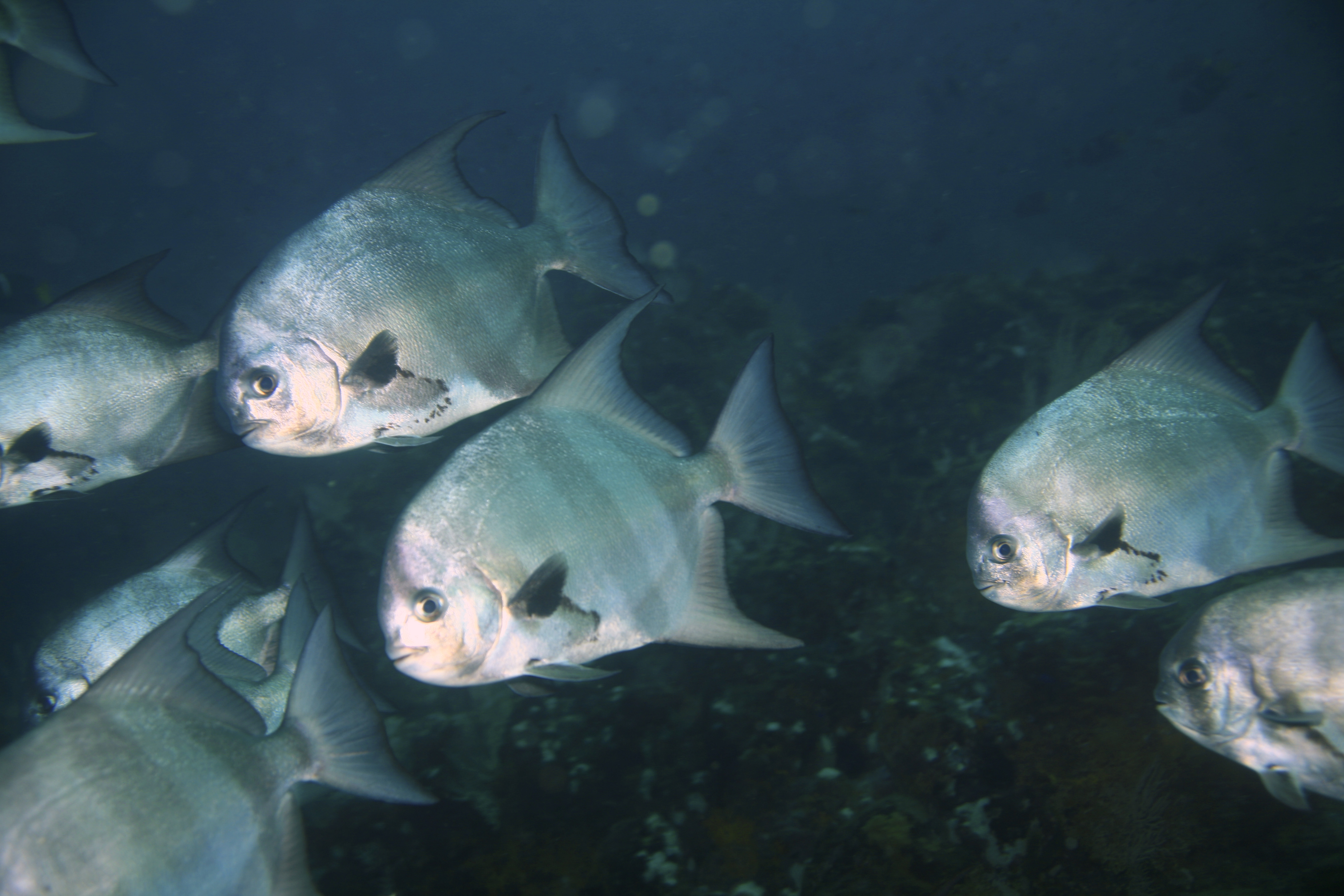
- A school of Pacific Spadefish, Sta. Catalina, Panama.

Conservation status
- Least Concern (IUCN 3.1)

Scientific classification
- Kingdom: Animalia
- Phylum: Chordata
- Class: Actinopterygii
- Order: Acanthuriformes
- Family: Ephippidae
- Genus: Chaetodipterus
- Species: C. zonatus

Binomial name
- Chaetodipterus zonatus (Girard, 1858)

Synonyms
- Ephippus zonatus Girard, 1858

= Chaetodipterus zonatus =

Species of fish

The Pacific spadefish (Chaetodipterus zonatus) is a species of fish of the family Ephippidae. It is native to the eastern Pacific, from San Diego, California to Peru, including the Galápagos Islands where it is known as Chambo.

== Appearance ==
C. zonatus has a very deep, compressed body with a blunt snout and a sloping, slightly concave profile. It has a small mouth with the posterior end of the jaw not passing the front of the eye. The maximum recorded size was 65 cm but more commonly reach a length of 25 cm.

They have six black bars on their head and the side of their body, although in large adults these can be difficult to see. Their dorsal fin is large and set well back on their body, the anal fin is opposite and of a similar shape; both have long spines. The pectoral and pelvic fins are small and the caudal fin is large and lunate. All the fins are black in colour.

== Habitat ==
C. zonatus is found in subtropical inshore seas, in areas with coral reefs or sandy bottoms, between 3–50 m. They have also been seen occasionally in estuaries, mangroves and lagoons. They normally form small schools and feed on benthic invertebrates.
