= West African spadefish =

Conservation status
- Least Concern (IUCN 3.1)

Scientific classification
- Kingdom: Animalia
- Phylum: Chordata
- Class: Actinopterygii
- Order: Acanthuriformes
- Family: Ephippidae
- Genus: Chaetodipterus
- Species: C. lippei

Binomial name
- Chaetodipterus lippei Steindachner, 1895

Synonyms
- Ephippus lippei (Steindachner, 1895)

Species of fish

The West African spadefish (Chaetodipterus lippei) is a species of marine ray-finned fish belonging to the family Ephippidae, the spadefishes. This species is found over sandy and muddy bottoms at depths of 10 to 50 m (33 to 164 ft) in the eastern Atlantic Ocean from Senegal to Angola, including Cape Verde. The West African spadefish reaches a maximum total length of 31 cm (12 in), although 20 cm (7.9 in) is more typical. This species was first formally described in 1895 by the Austrian ichthyologist Franz Steindachner with its type locality given as Freetown in Liberia. Its specific name honours a Dr Lippe who collected the type while on a voyage on the SM Helgoland.
