= Angelfish =

Angelfish may refer to:

- Several groups of fish:
  - Freshwater angelfish, tropical cichlids of the genus Pterophyllum
  - Marine angelfish of the family Pomacanthidae
  - Atlantic pomfret (Brama brama), sold by fishmongers as "angelfish" in South Africa (where it is a bycatch of the hake fishery)
  - Angelshark of the family Squatinidae
  - Atlantic spadefish (Chaetodipterus faber)
  - Cave angelfish, a karst-dwelling member of the family Balitoridae, found only in Thailand
- Angelfish (band), a short-lived Scottish alternative rock band, former band of Garbage's Shirley Manson
  - Angelfish (album), a 1994 album by the band Angelfish
- Angelfish charity, a UK charity that helps disabled and deprived children in Cambodia
- Mark Twain's angelfish, a group of young women who served as surrogate granddaughters to author Mark Twain (Samuel Clemens) during the last years of his life
