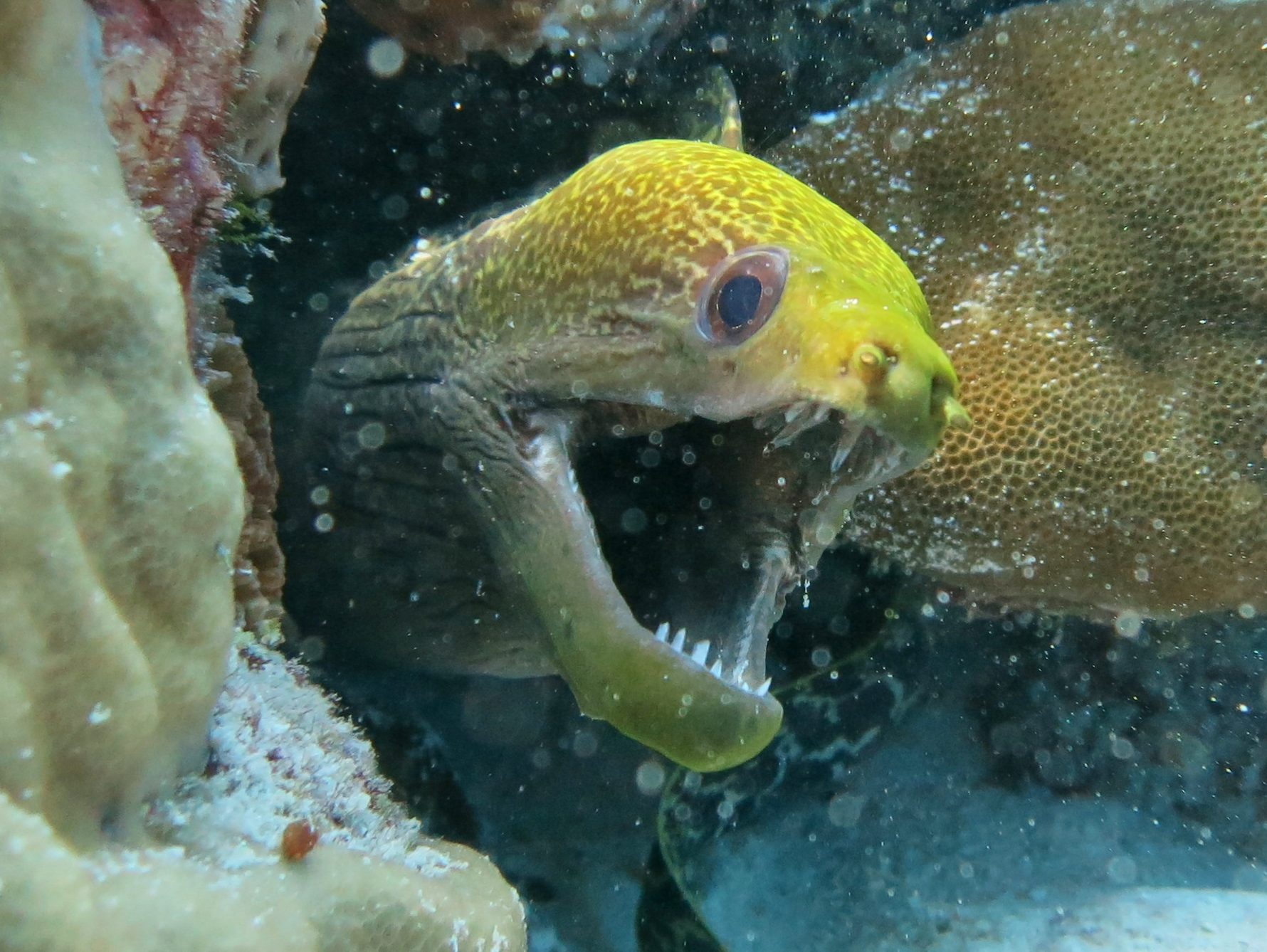

Conservation status
- Least Concern (IUCN 3.1)

Scientific classification
- Kingdom: Animalia
- Phylum: Chordata
- Class: Actinopterygii
- Order: Anguilliformes
- Family: Muraenidae
- Genus: Gymnothorax
- Species: G. undulatus

Binomial name
- Gymnothorax undulatus (Lacépède, 1803)

= Undulated moray =

Species of fish

The undulated moray (Gymnothorax undulatus) is a moray eel of the family Muraenidae, found in the Indo-Pacific and east-central Pacific Ocean at depths down to 30 m. Their length is up to 1.5 m.

== Description and biology ==
The undulated moray can easily be identified by its yellow head and brown spots covering its body. It is also lined by white borders forming similar to a chain link. They use their large mouths to pump water to the gills, while the gill cover is a small hole to protect the delicate gills. Like most eels, they lack the pectoral and pelvic fins to make it easier for them to move through the crevices of reefs. Their other fins are fitted with thicker skin to protect from sharp reef. They move in a S-shape to be able to move back and forth to also aid in movement through reefs. Their teeth are shaped to be curved backwards so they can hold onto their prey and easily move the prey backwards for digestion.

== Distribution and habitat ==
Gymnothorax undulatus can be found in the Pacific as well as East Africa. Most of the time they can be found in reefs of lagoons and seawards or in reef-flats. They like to shelter within reefs and can be found from depths of 1 to 50 meters. The undulated moray is nocturnal as they hide in reefs during the day and hunt for food at night.

== Human use and cultural significance ==
The undulated eel and several other species of eels (puhi) are featured in many Hawaiian stories as common ʻaumakua, thought to be ancestors protecting families. This eel is known as laumilo or "milo leaf" from the way it swims similar to blown leaves of the milo tree, it itself is considered a guardian for the tree according to the Kumulipo. This eel was also a common form that Kū, the Hawaiian god of war, would take to interact with humans.

For many native Hawaiian communities eels were an important food source and used for special dishes when leaders had special guests, this particular eel is deemed "highly relished".
