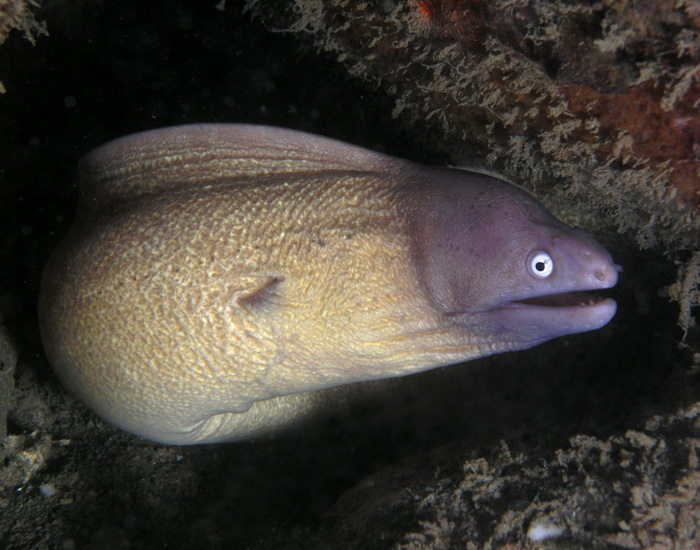

Scientific classification
- Kingdom: Animalia
- Phylum: Chordata
- Class: Actinopterygii
- Order: Anguilliformes
- Family: Muraenidae
- Genus: Gymnothorax
- Species: G. thyrsoideus

Binomial name
- Gymnothorax thyrsoideus (J. Richardson, 1845)

= Greyface moray eel =

Species of fish

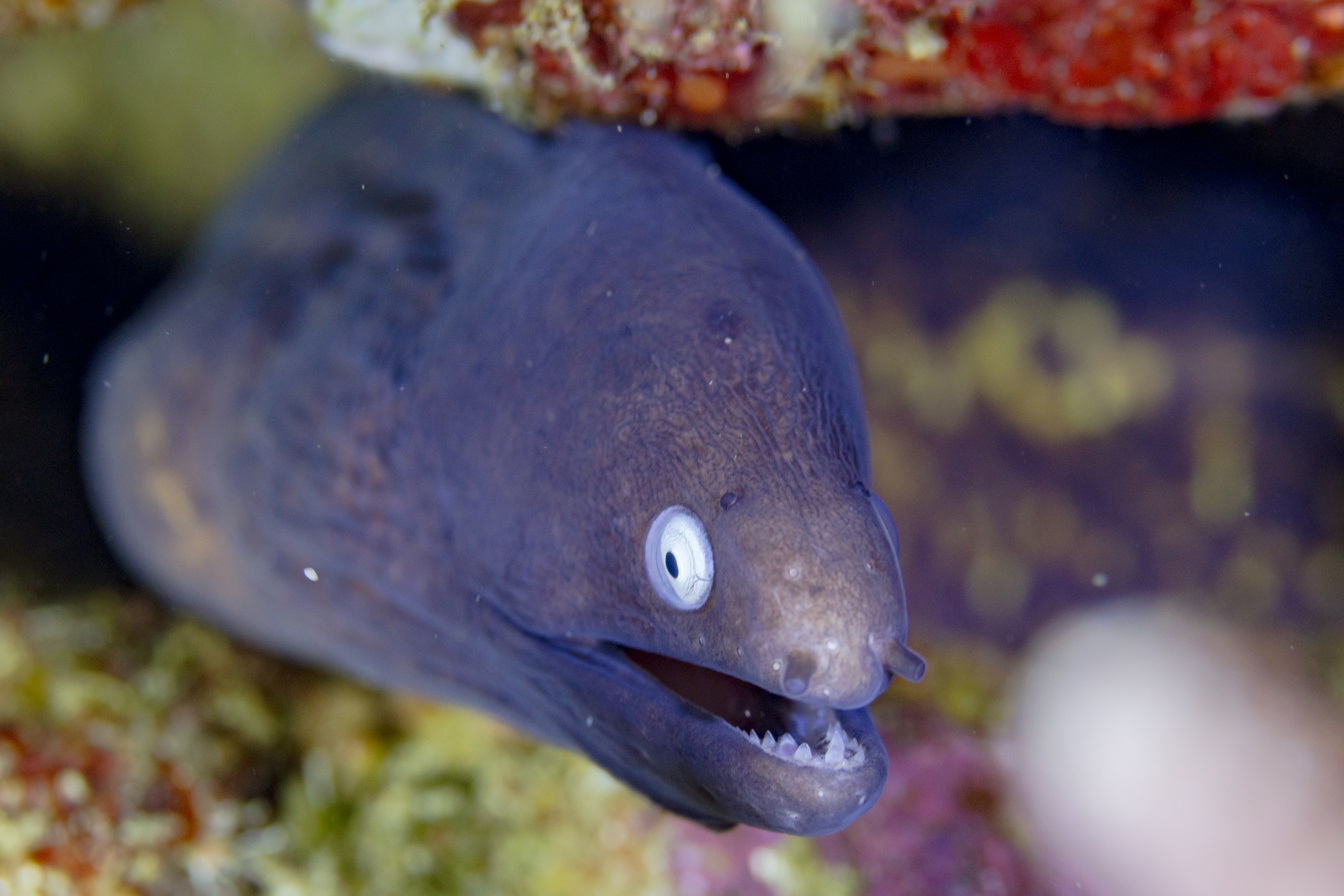
Close-up

The greyface moray eel, also called the freckled moray, slender moray, or white-eyed moray, Gymnothorax thyrsoideus, is a species of marine fish in the family Muraenidae.

== Description ==
The Greyface moray is a medium-sized fish that is most commonly observed at lengths of around 40 cm, reaching a maximum length of 66 cm. Its body is serpentine in shape, is speckled with small dark spots and has a predominantly beige color that can vary in strength between different eels . The head is grey with distinctive white eyes.

== Distribution and habitat ==
The greyface moray is widespread throughout the Indo-Pacific area from India and the Maldives to Polynesia and from south Japan to Australia and New Caledonia.

This moray likes shallow and somewhat turbid waters from lagoons, protected reefs and areas rich in debris like wrecks around 35 meters deep.

== Biology ==
The greyface moray is a carnivore of benthic fish. During the day, it sits in a shelter, often with other morays. When night arrives it leaves its lair and actively hunts prey, consisting of small fish and crustaceans.
