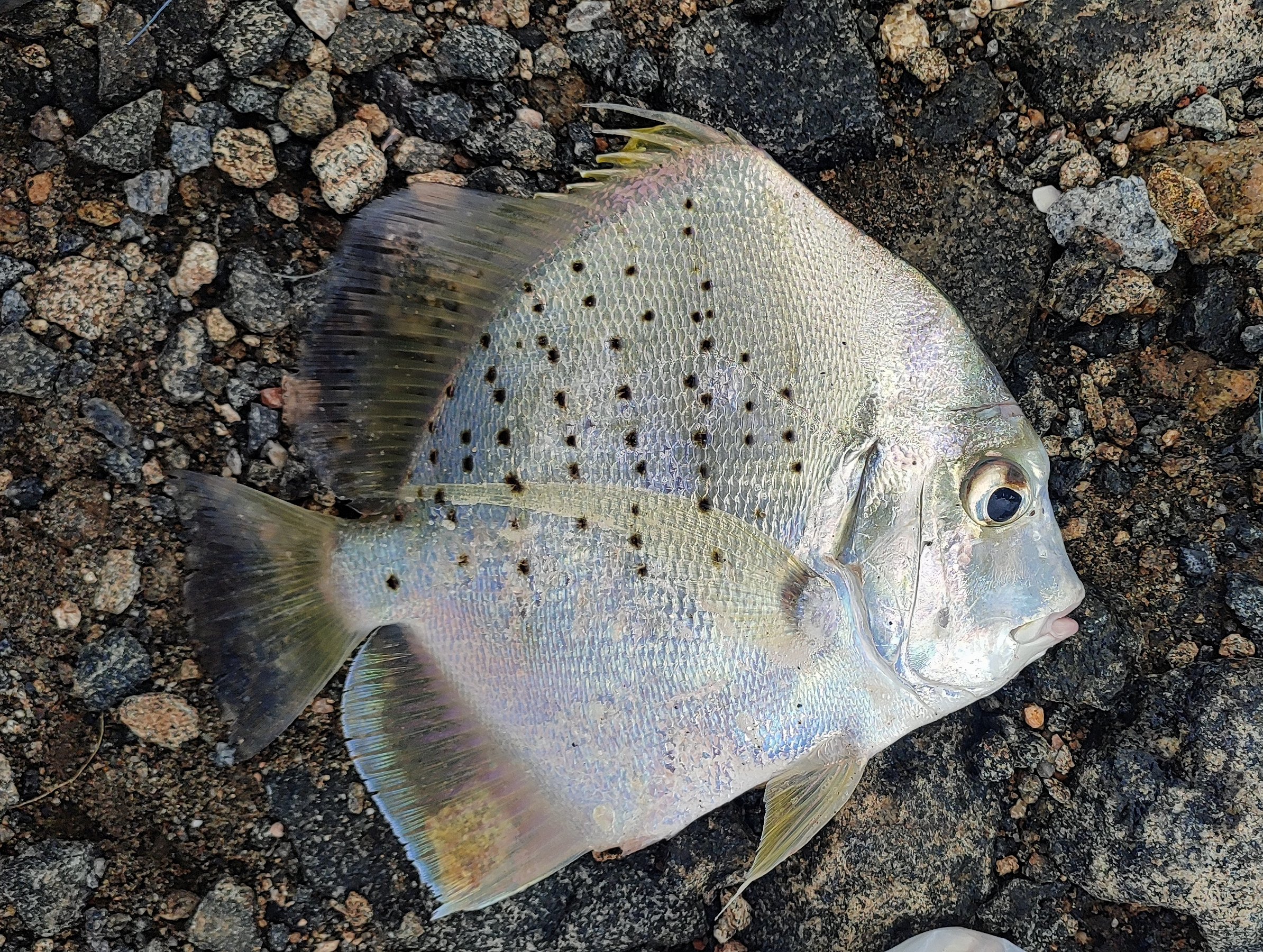
- Spotted sicklefish (D. punctata)

Scientific classification
- Kingdom: Animalia
- Phylum: Chordata
- Class: Actinopterygii
- Order: Acanthuriformes
- Family: Drepaneidae; T. N. Gill, 1872
- Genus: Drepane; G. Cuvier, 1831

Type species
- Chaetodon punctatus Linnaeus, 1758

= Drepane (fish) =

Genus of ray-finned fishes

Drepane is a genus of marine and brackish water ray-finned fishes, known commonly as the sicklefishes. It is the only genus in the monotypic percomorph family Drepaneidae. These fish occur in the Indian and western Pacific Oceans, and in the eastern Atlantic near Africa.

== Taxonomy ==
Drepane was first proposed as a genus in 1831 by the French zoologist Georges Cuvier. In 1917 David Starr Jordan designated Chaetodon punctatus, which had been described by Linnaeus in the 10th edition of Systema Naturae published in 1758 with its type locality given as Asia, as its type species. In 1872 Theodore Gill classified the genus within the family Drepaneidae and it is the only genus classified within that family. The 5th edition of Fishes of the World classifies the Drepaneidae within the order Moroniformes alongside the Moronidae and Ephippidae. However, other authorities have found that the Moronidae is not closely related to the other two families and classify the Drepaneidae and the Ephippidae in the order Ephippiformes. Other authorities classify all three families in the Moroniformes sensu Fishes of the World in the Acanthuriformes.

== Etymology ==
Drepane means "sickle" and this refers to the sickle-shaped pectoral fins.

== Species ==
The currently recognized species in this genus are:

- Drepane africana Osório, 1892 (African sicklefish)
- Drepane longimana (Bloch & J. G. Schneider, 1801) (Concertina fish)
- Drepane punctata (Linnaeus, 1758) (Spotted sicklefish)

== Characteristics ==
Drepane sicklefishes have 13 or 14 spines and between 19 and 22 soft rays in the dorsal fin and 3 spines and between and 17 and 19 soft rays in the anal fin. They have a highly protractile mouth, the pectoral fins are longer than the head and are shape like sickles. The distal part of the maxilla is exposed but the subocular shelf is absent. They have 24 vertebrae. These fishes attain a maximum published total length of 50 cm (20 in).

== Distribution and habitat ==
Drepane sicklefishes are found in the eastern Atlantic and the Indo-Pacific. They are inshore fishes found on sand or mud bottoms in reefs, estuaries and harbours.

== See also ==
- List of fish families
