= Gymnothorax pseudoherrei =

Scientific classification
- Kingdom: Animalia
- Phylum: Chordata
- Class: Actinopterygii
- Order: Anguilliformes
- Family: Muraenidae
- Genus: Gymnothorax
- Species: G. pseudoherrei

Binomial name
- Gymnothorax pseudoherrei E. B. Böhlke, 2000

Species of fish

Gymnothorax pseudoherrei is a moray eel found in the Indo-west Pacific Ocean. It was first named by Böhlke in 2000, and is commonly known as the false brown moray. A similar species, Gymnothorax arabicus (Arabian false brown moray) from the waters around the Arabian Peninsula was initially thought to be the same species, before being described as new in 2024.
