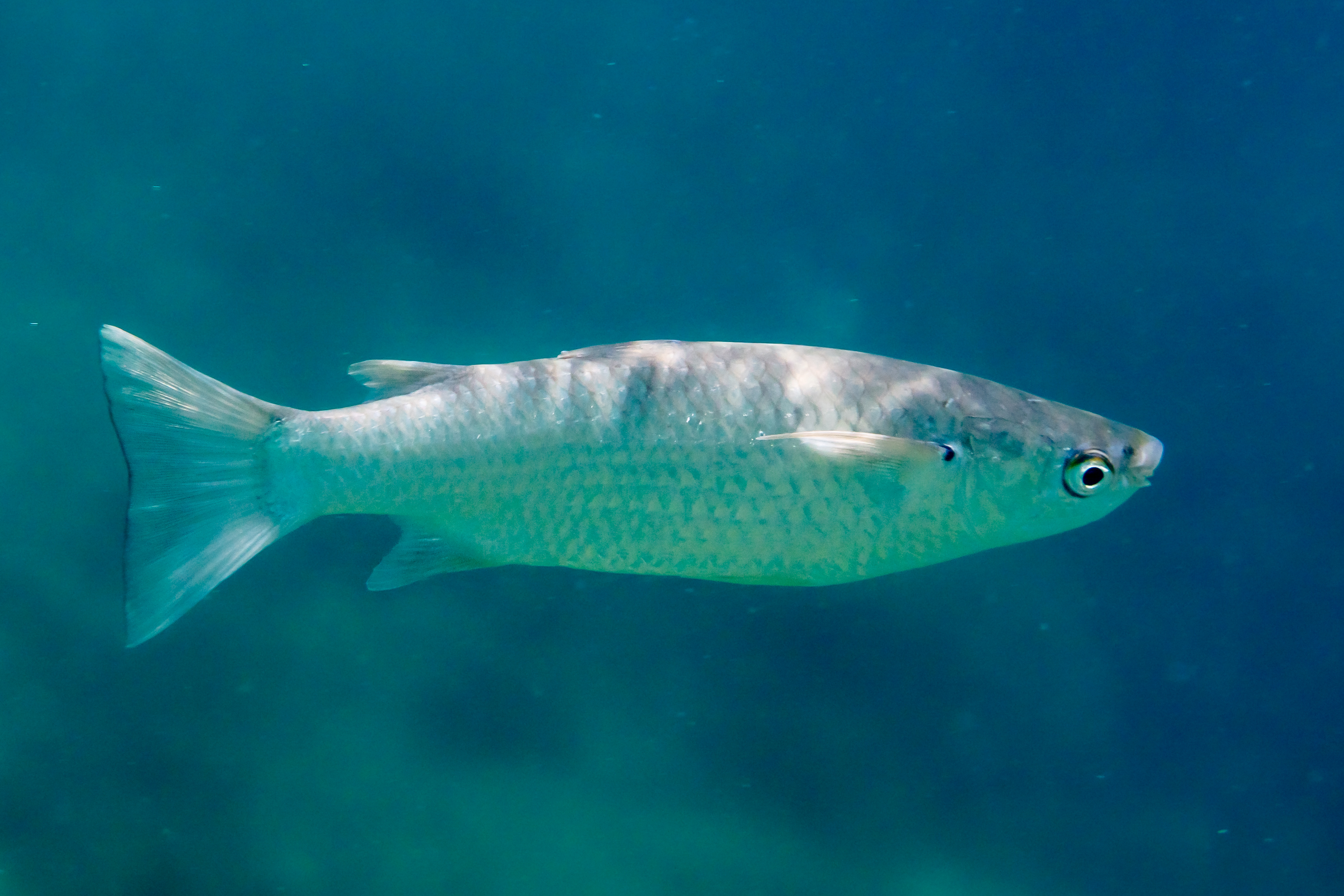

Conservation status
- Least Concern (IUCN 3.1)

Scientific classification
- Kingdom: Animalia
- Phylum: Chordata
- Class: Actinopterygii
- Order: Mugiliformes
- Family: Mugilidae
- Genus: Ellochelon; Whitley, 1930
- Species: E. vaigiensis

Binomial name
- Ellochelon vaigiensis (Quoy & Gaimard, 1825)

Synonyms
- Mugil vaigiensis Quoy & Gaimard, 1825; Chelon vaigiensis (Quoy & Gaimard, 1825); Liza vaigiensis (Quoy & Gaimard, 1825); Mugil macrolepidotus Rüppell, 1830; Mugil melanochir Valenciennes, 1836; Mugil rossii Bleeker, 1854; Mugil tegobuan Montrouzier, 1857; Mugil occidentalis Castelnau, 1873; Mugil ventricosus Castelnau, 1875; Mugil delicatus Jouan, 1878

= Squaretail mullet =

Species of fish

The squaretail mullet (Ellochelon vaigiensis), also known as the diamondscale mullet, is a species of grey mullet from the family Mugilidae. It is an Indo-Pacific species and is the only species in the monospecific genus Ellochelon.

== Description ==
The squaretail mullet is olive-brown on its back with silvery flanks and a white or yellowish belly. It has six longitudinal stripes along its sides which are formed by darker longitudinal markings on the scales which also have darkened edges creating a slight chequered appearance on the flanks. The iris has yellow patches. The fins have dark margins which contrasts with their mainly yellowish cast but the caudal fin is obviously yellow and in smaller specimens the pectoral fin is totally black but the lower part becomes yellowish in older fish.

== Distribution ==
The squaretail mullet occurs from the Red Sea and the coast of East Africa, as far south as Mozambique, eastwards through the Indo-pacific to New Caledonia and the Great Barrier Reef and north to southern Japan.

== Habitat and biology ==
The squaretail mullet can be found in lagoons, estuaries, sheltered sandy shorelines and coastal creeks and can enter freshwater, having been found up to 10 kilometres (6.2 miles) up rivers, although they normally do not move further inland than the influence of the tides. They can form large aggregations among mangroves and the juveniles are frequently recorded in rice paddies and mangroves. They feed on phytoplankton, algae and detritus. Spawning is at sea, and the eggs are pelagic and do not adhere to objects.

== Human utilisation ==
The smaller fish are caught for use as bait fish. It is also locally used as a food fish being marketed fresh; its roe is also sold and eaten. It is fished for using beach seines, gillnets, cast nets and stake nets.
