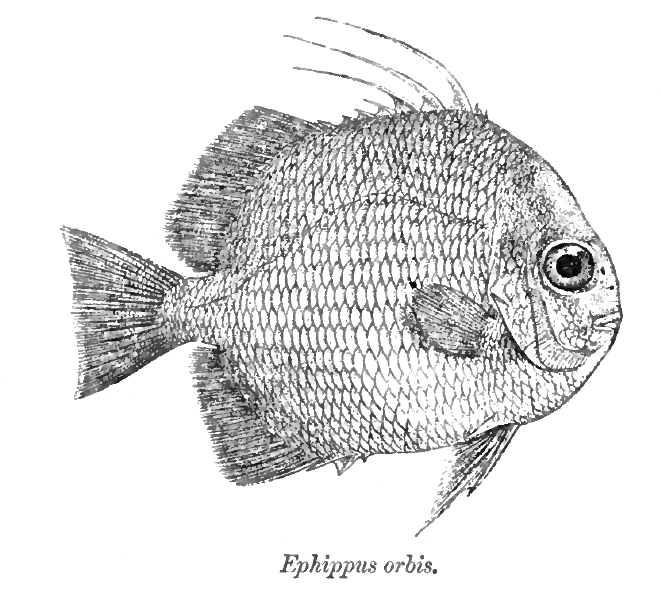
- Ephippus orbis as illustrated by Francis Day in The Fauna of British India

Scientific classification
- Kingdom: Animalia
- Phylum: Chordata
- Class: Actinopterygii
- Order: Acanthuriformes
- Family: Ephippidae
- Genus: Ephippus; Cuvier, 1816

Type species
- Chaetodon orbis Bloch, 1787

Synonyms
- Ephippeus; Epippus

= Ephippus (fish) =

Genus of fishes

Ephippus is a genus of marine ray-finned fishes belonging to the family Ephippidae, the spadefishes. These fishes are found in the eastern Atlantic Ocean and in the Indo-West Pacific region.

== Species ==
There are currently two recognized species in this genus:

- Ephippus goreensis Cuvier, 1831 (East Atlantic African spadefish)
- Ephippus orbis (Bloch, 1787) (Orbfish)
