= Gymnothorax arabicus =

Scientific classification
- Kingdom: Animalia
- Phylum: Chordata
- Class: Actinopterygii
- Order: Anguilliformes
- Family: Muraenidae
- Genus: Gymnothorax
- Species: G. arabicus

Binomial name
- Gymnothorax arabicus Smith, Bogorodsky, Dandar & Zajonz, 2024

Species of fish

Gymnothorax arabicus is a species of moray eel in the genus Gymnothorax. It was described in 2024 from Socotra, the Red Sea and the Persian Gulf. Before its description, specimens of this species were confused with the similar false brown moray (Gymnothorax pseudoherrei), such as in the Persian Gulf.
