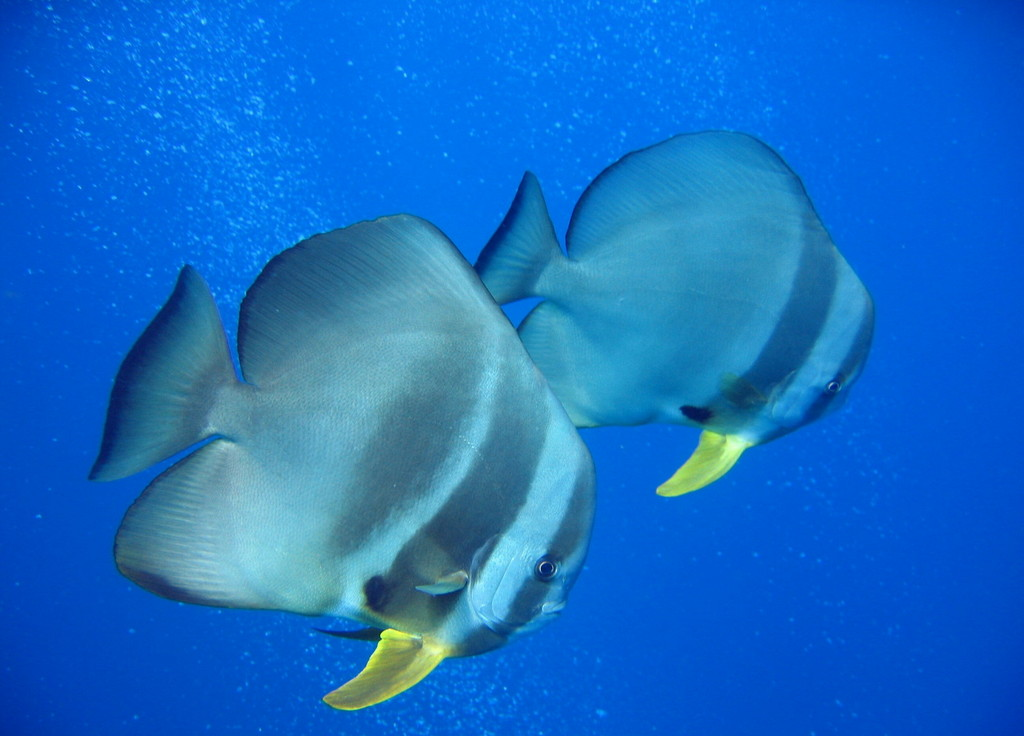
- Platax teira

Scientific classification
- Kingdom: Animalia
- Phylum: Chordata
- Class: Actinopterygii
- Division: Teleostei
- Order: Acanthuriformes
- Family: Ephippidae; Bleeker, 1859

= Ephippidae =

Ephippidae Temporal range: Eocene–Recent

Family of fishes

Ephippidae is a family of percomorph fishes in the suborder Moronoidei of the order Acanthuriformes. These fishes, commonly known as spadefishes, are found in the tropical and temperate oceans of the world, except for the central Pacific.

== Taxonomy ==
Ephippidae was first proposed as a family in 1859 by the Dutch herpetologist and ichthyologist Pieter Bleeker. The 5th edition of the Fishes of the World classifies this family in the order Moroniformes with the Moronidae and Drepaneidae. Other authorities place this family alongside the Drepaneidae in the order Ephippiformes with the Moronidae classified as incertae sedis in the series Eupercaria. Other authorities classify all three families in the Moroniformes sensu Fishes of the World in the Acanthuriformes.

== Genera ==
Ephippidae contains the following genera, eight extant and three extinct († means extinct):

- †Archaephippus Blot, 1969
- Chaetodipterus Lacépède, 1802
- †Eoplatax Blot, 1969
- Ephippus Cuvier, 1816
- †Laparon Casier, 1966
- Parapsettus Steindachner, 1875
- Platax Cuvier, 1816
- Proteracanthus Günther, 1859
- Rhinoprenes Munro, 1964
- Tripterodon Playfair, 1867
- Zabidius Whitley, 1930

The extinct genus Exellia is classified within the Ephippidae by some authorities, other authorities place it in the family Exellidae.

== Characteristics ==
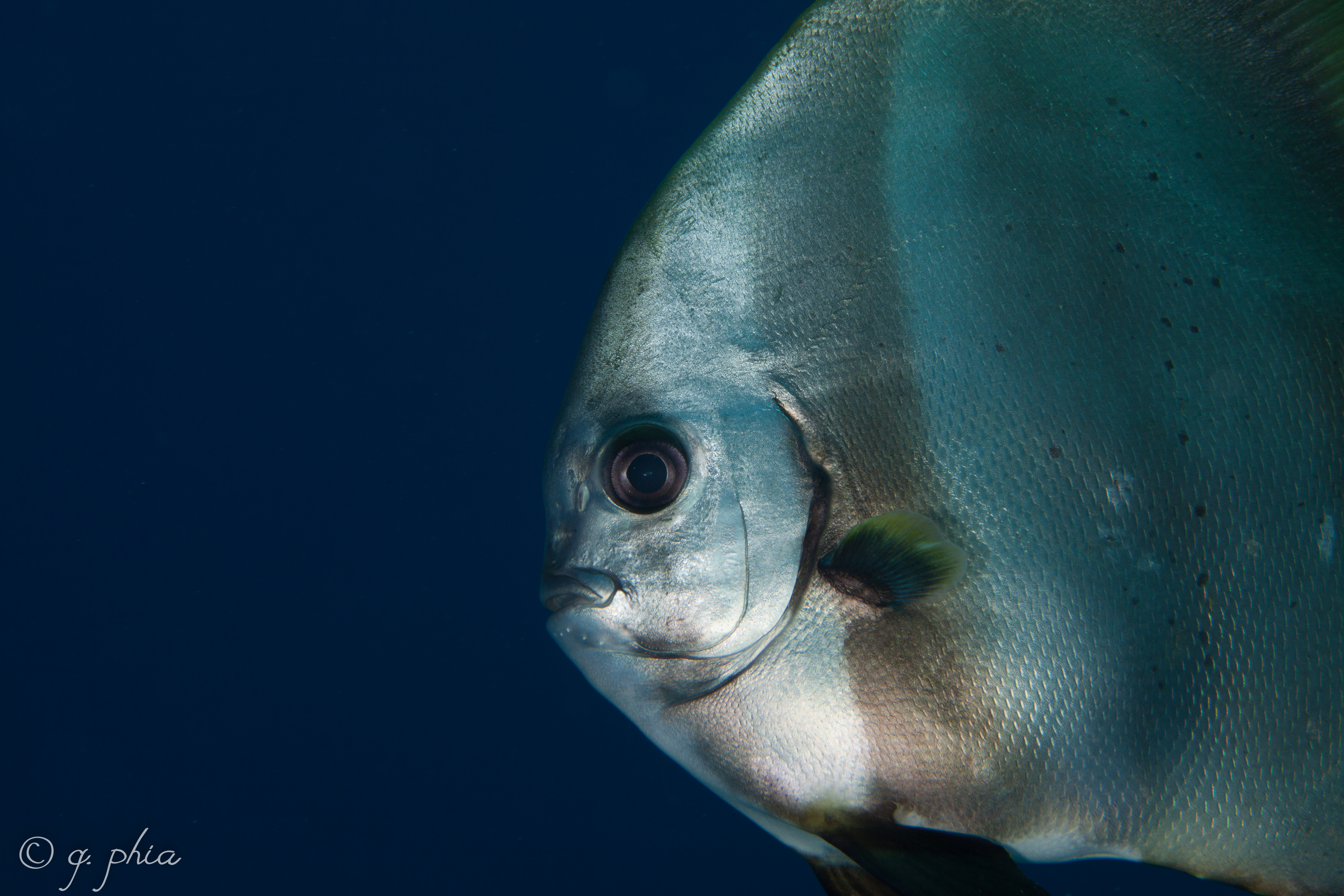
Close up Spadefish at Wakatobi National Park, Maya bay, 2016

Ephippidae spadefishes have deep, oval-shaped, laterally compressed bodies with a short head and small terminal mouth. There are bands of brush like teeth on the jaws but there are no teeth on the roof of the mouth. The preoperculum has a finely serrated margin. There is a single dorsal fin which has 9 spines and between 21 and 28 soft rays, with the spiny portion of the fin being low. The front part of the soft part of the dorsal fin and the anal fin are elongated. The anal fin has 3 spines and between 16 and 24 soft rays. The pectoral fins are short and the pelvic fins are long and are beneath the pectoral fins. The caudal fin is slightly concave, They have complete lateral line and the head, body and most of the fins are scaled. Young are frequently marked with black bars. The largest species is the Atlantic spadefish (Chaetodipterus faber) which has a maximum published total length of 91 cm (36 in) while the smallest is the threadfin scat (Rhinoprenes pentanemus) which has a maximum published total length of 15 cm (5.9 in).

== Distribution ==
Ephippidae fishes are found throughout the warmer waters of the world but are absent from the central Pacific. Ephippidae spadefishes (Chaetodipterus faber) are the only ephippid found in the western Atlantic Ocean. While Ephippidae spadefishes are common in the western Atlantic from New England to southern Brazil, adult spadefishes are difficult to harvest commercially due to their size and preferred habitats of submerged spaces, despite consumer appeal for its nutrients and quality of flesh.

== Biology ==
Ephippidae spadefishes eat algae, benthic and planktonic invertebrates such as sponges, zoantharians, polychaete worms, gorgonians and tunicates. The batfish Platax pinnatus may play the role of a critical functional group in the Great Barrier Reef by eating seaweed that other herbivorous fishes such as parrotfish and surgeonfish will not touch. Overgrowth of seaweed among corals occurs as a result of overfishing of large fish species and inhibits the ability of coral to support life.
