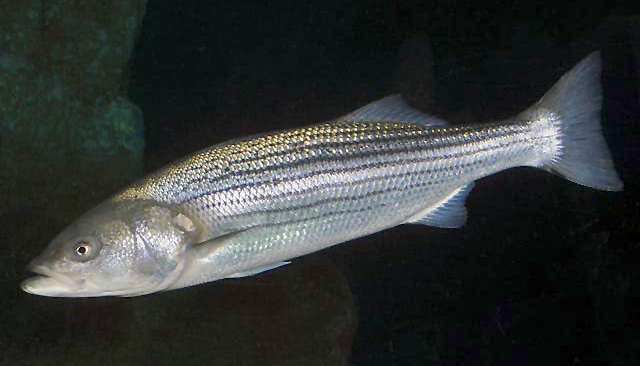
- Striped bass (Morone saxatilis)

Scientific classification
- Kingdom: Animalia
- Phylum: Chordata
- Class: Actinopterygii
- Clade: Percomorpha
- Order: Moroniformes

Families
- see text

= Moroniformes =

Order of ray-finned fishes

Moroniformes is an order of ray-finned fishes in the series Percomorpha.

== Families ==
Moroniformes comprises three families according to the 5th edition of the Fishes of the World:

- Moronidae Jordan & Evermann, 1896
- Drepaneidae Gill, 1872
- Ephippidae Bleeker, 1859

== Classification ==
Moroniformes is classified as an order within the series Percomorpha in the 5th edition of Fishes of the World but the authors of that text acknowledge that their classification of the order is rather tentative. Later authors recognise that two of the families, the Ephippidae and the Drepaneidae are closely related and classified in the order Ephippiformes but that Moronidae is incertae sedis in their series Eupercaria. Other authorities classify all three families in the Moroniformes sensu Fishes of the World in the Acanthuriformes.
