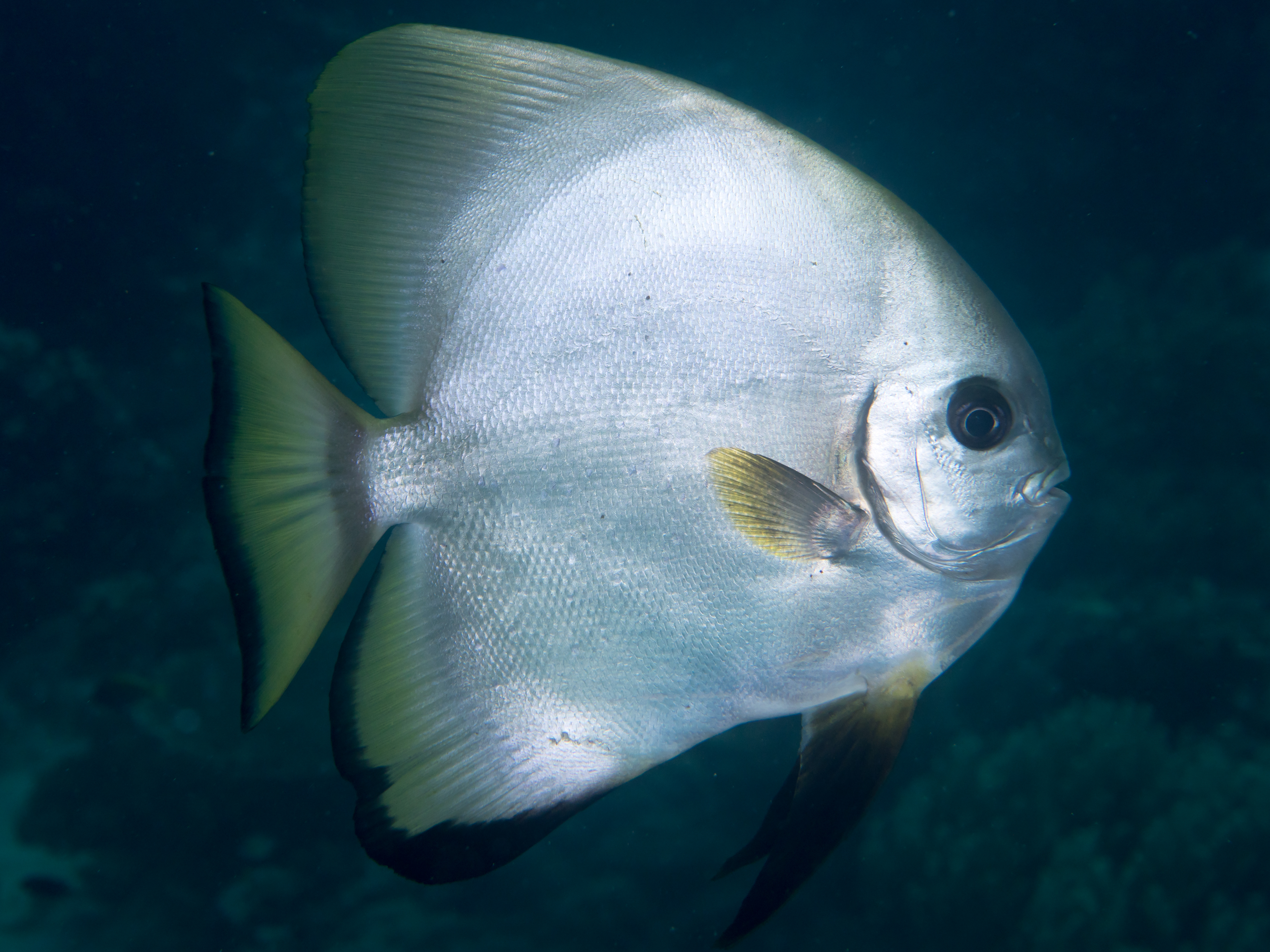
- Adult
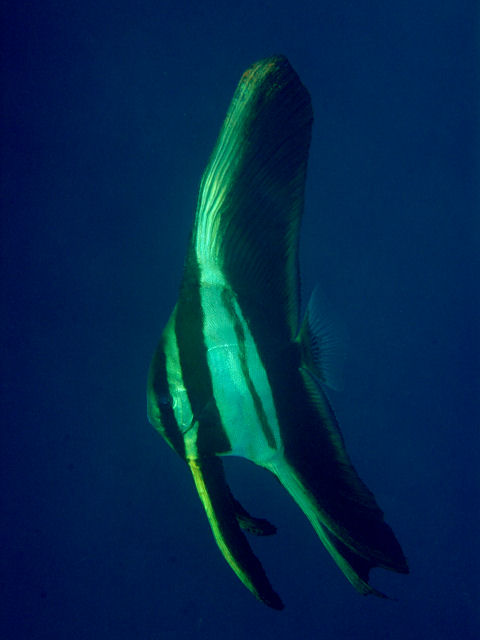
- Juvenile

Scientific classification
- Kingdom: Animalia
- Phylum: Chordata
- Class: Actinopterygii
- Order: Acanthuriformes
- Family: Ephippidae
- Genus: Platax
- Species: P. boersii

Binomial name
- Platax boersii Bleeker, 1853

= Platax boersii =

Species of ray-finned fish

Platax boersii, the golden spadefish or Boers’ batfish, is a species of marine ray-finned fish belonging to the family Ephippidae, the spadefishes and bay fishes. This species is found in the Indo-West Pacific.

== Taxonomy ==
Platax boersii was first formally described in 1853 by the Dutch physician, herpetologist and ichthyologist Pieter Bleeker with its type locality given as Makassar, Sulawesi, Indonesia. This species is classified within the genus Platax which belongs to the family Ephippidae in the order Moroniformes. The specific name honours Major W. J. A. W. Boers of the Royal Netherlands East Indies Army, who supplied Bleeker with the type of this fish, among others from the Dutch East Indies.

== Description ==
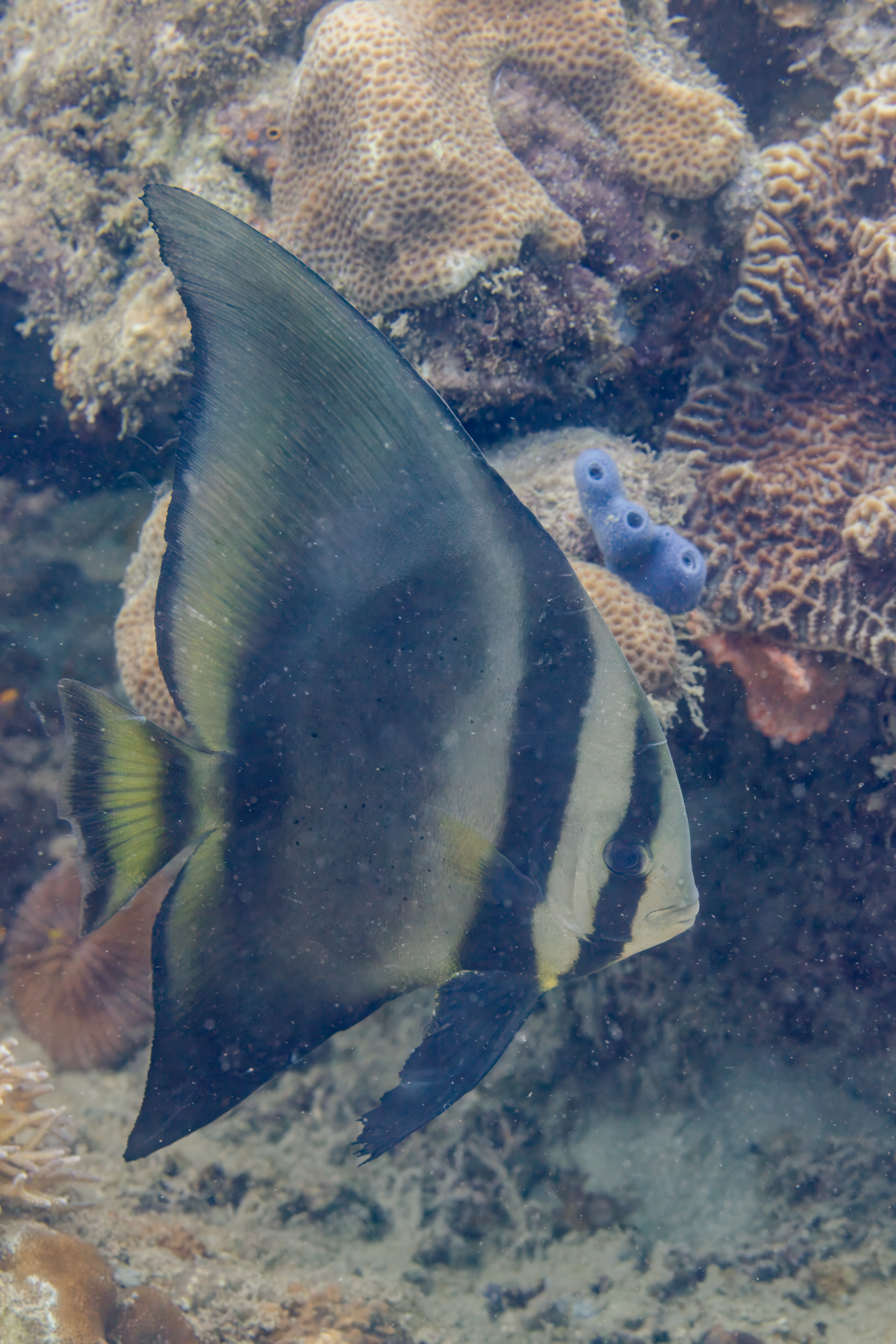
Young

Platax boersii adults have a smoothly rounded profile on the head, similar to that of the orbicular batfish (P. orbicularus) but differ in their golden sheen and the absence of small black spots. The juveniles resemble those of P.teira in their possession of extremely elongated dorsal and anal fins but differ in their silvery sheen and overall paler colour. The adults of this species, with a length exceeding 18 cm (7.1 in), are yellowish-silver in colour with a scattering of small dark spots on the body. There is a dark vertical bar through the eye and another dark bar to the rear of the head. The caudal, pectoral, anal and dorsal fins are yellowish green with the margin of the anal fin and the rear margin of the caudal fin being black. The pelvic fins are black. The small juveniles are yellowish brown or silvery, with the same 2 black bars on the head as the adults. The posterior third of the body is blackish and this continues onto the dorsal and anal fins, and the front of this black region on the body is frequently closely preceded by a thin, indistinct dark bar. The caudal fin is transparent except for its black base. The dorsal fin is supported by 5 spines and 31 to 34 soft rays while the anal fin contains 3 spines and 24 to 28 soft rays. This species has reached a maximum published total length of 40 cm (16 in).

== Distribution and habitat ==
Platax boersii are found on or near reefs in depths of 10 to 60 m (33 to 197 ft) as both juveniles and adults. They can be solitary or found in small schools. Schools are found along drop offs in tall structures of corals but solitary fish are more typical inshore.

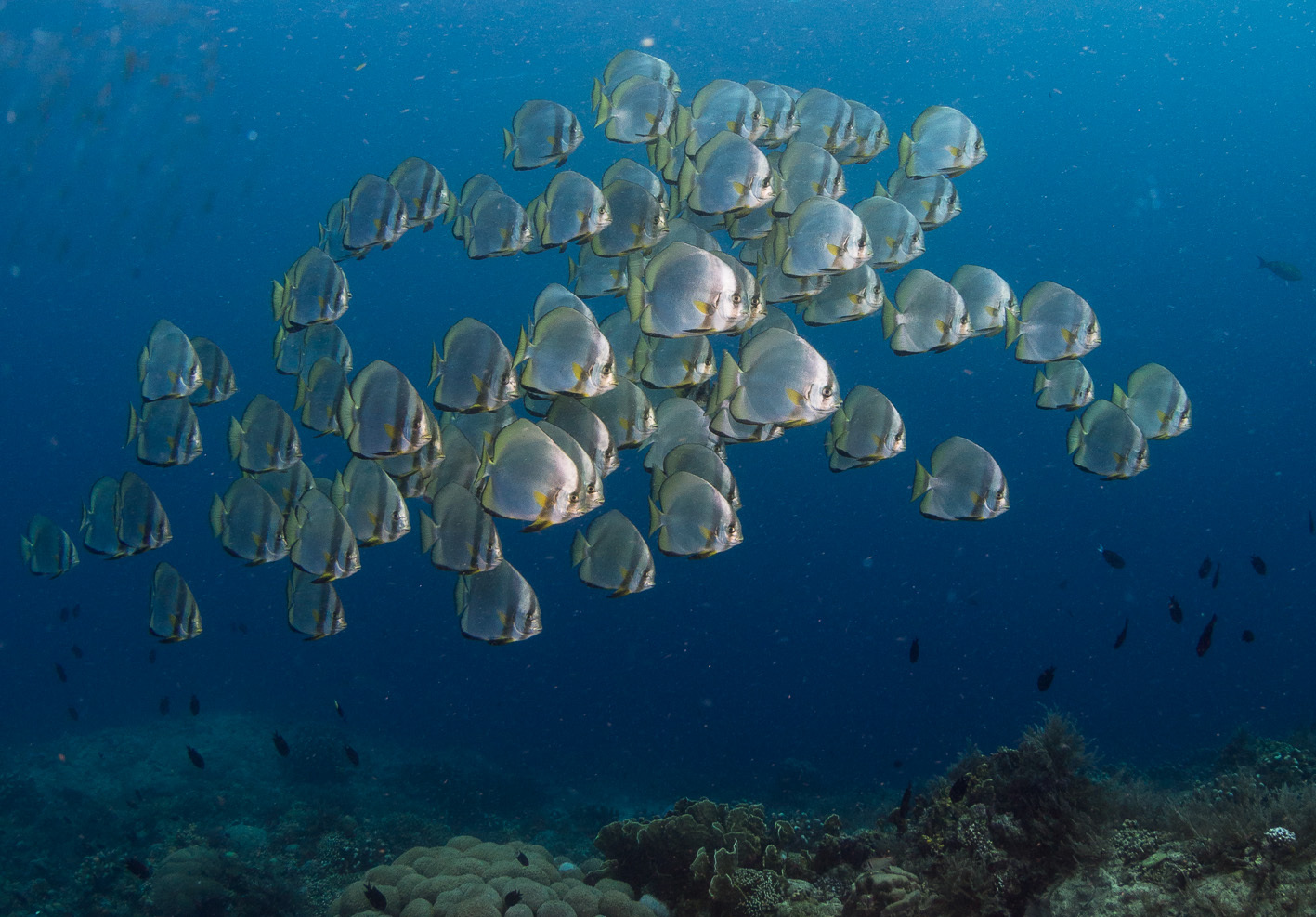
Adults schooling

These fishes are found in Indonesia, the Philippines and Papua New Guinea.

== Biology ==
Platax boersii is little known but it has been found to be an omnivorous species eating algae, crustaceans and smaller fishes.
