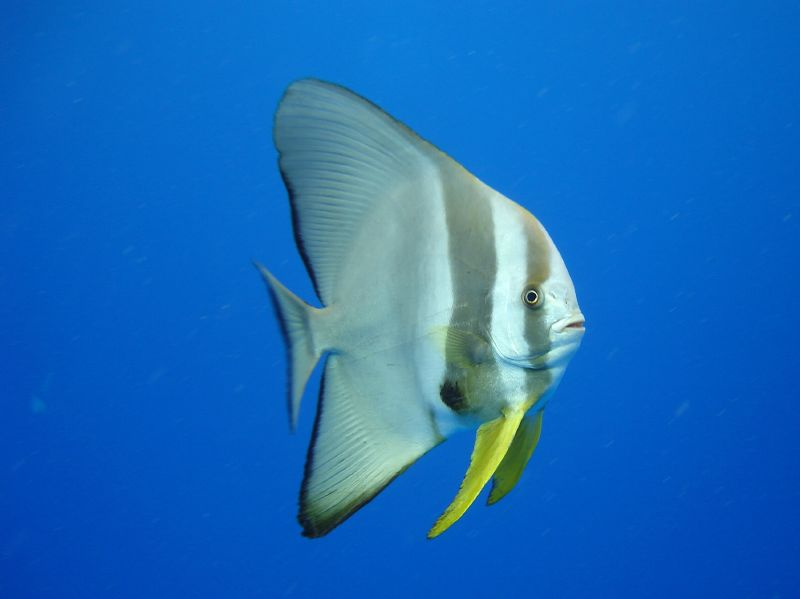
- Platax teira

Scientific classification
- Kingdom: Animalia
- Phylum: Chordata
- Class: Actinopterygii
- Order: Acanthuriformes
- Family: Ephippidae
- Genus: Platax; G. Cuvier, 1816

Type species
- Chaetodon teira Bloch & J. G. Schneider, 1801

Species
- See text

= Platax =

Platax Temporal range: Eocene–Recent

Genus of fishes

Platax is a genus of Indo-Pacific, reef-associated fish belonging to the family Ephippidae. There are currently five known extant species generally accepted to belong to the genus. They are one of the fish taxa commonly known as "batfish".

== Description ==
Members of the genus Platax are generally similar in shape to the other species in the family. Adults are rather disc-shaped fish, with laterally compressed bodies and large dorsal and anal fins that give individuals a somewhat triangular profile. Platax teira is the largest species, reaching lengths of around 70 centimetres (28 in). The other species reach maximum lengths of around 40–65 cm (16–26 in). It is extremely crucial for these fish to live in waters of a higher salinity percentage. This will allow for the fish to be greatly and positively impacted when it comes to their growth and survival.

== Distribution ==
Platax can be found in reefs throughout the entire Indo-Pacific region. Their range extends from the western Indian Ocean in the Red Sea to as far east as Australia. Most Platax species can be found in higher latitudes, as high as the Ryukyu Islands in Japan and as far south as the eastern coast of Australia. However, the ranges of the individual species is not consistent throughout the genus' range. Platax pinnatus for example is most likely not found in the Indian Ocean. A few individuals have been found in Atlantic waters. Apparently, the species Platax orbicularis has been observed in Florida waters as a non-native, invasive species. The aquarium industry has been blamed for the spread of this species into the Caribbean.

Members of the genus are most common around reefs and shipwrecks.

== Taxonomy ==
The genus was first used by Cuvier with the publication of his 1816 system of animal classification. He assigned the genus to the batfish species Platax boersii, a classification which still holds to this day. Another species to be assigned to the genus by Cuvier was Platax ocellatus, a butterflyfish that is now more correctly classified in the genus Chaetodon in Chaetodontidae. In the same work, a species that is now known to belong to the genus, Platax teira was classified by Cuvier in a different genus, Chaetodon teira.

A few species have been assigned to the genus that have since been reclassified into other genera. The butterflyfish, C. ocellatus mentioned above, is one of these species. Another species that has been mistakenly classified as a Platax is the common freshwater angelfish, Pterophyllum scalare. In a joint effort with Valenciennes, Cuvier published a natural history work in 1831 where the freshwater angelfish was classified as Platax scalaris. The freshwater angelfish, of course is not as closely related to the marine batfish as to warrant classification in the same genus. A more scientifically acceptable mis-classification would be that of the species Zabidius novemaculeatus. This species was first described as Platax novemaculeatus by Mcculloch when it was discovered from Australia in the early 1900s. The species is now classified in the genus Zabidius, which is still in the same family as the genus Platax.

The generic name, "platax" was coined from the Greek term platys 'flat'. This refers to the generally compressed body shape of the fish. They are commonly called "batfish". However, they are not the only fish taxon called by this name. Fish from the only distantly related family Ogcocephalidae are also commonly known as "batfish". Other families with species that have been referred to as "batfish" include the families Dactylopteridae, Drepaneidae, Monacanthidae, and Monodactylidae.

== Species ==
There are currently five recognized extant species in this genus:

Species	Common name	Adult	Juvenile
Platax batavianus G. Cuvier, 1831	Humpback batfish		
Platax boersii Bleeker, 1852	Golden spadefish		
Platax orbicularis (Forsskål, 1775)	Orbicular batfish		
Platax pinnatus (Linnaeus, 1758)	Dusky batfish		
Platax teira (Forsskål, 1775)	Longfin batfish		

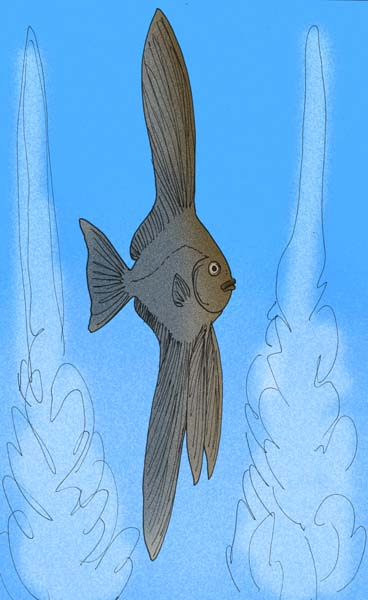
†Platax altissimus reconstruction

There are also at least four fossil species known:

- †Platax altissimus Agassiz, 1842
- †Platax macropterygious Agassiz, 1842
- †Platax papilio Agassiz, 1842
- †Platax woodwardii Agassiz, 1842
