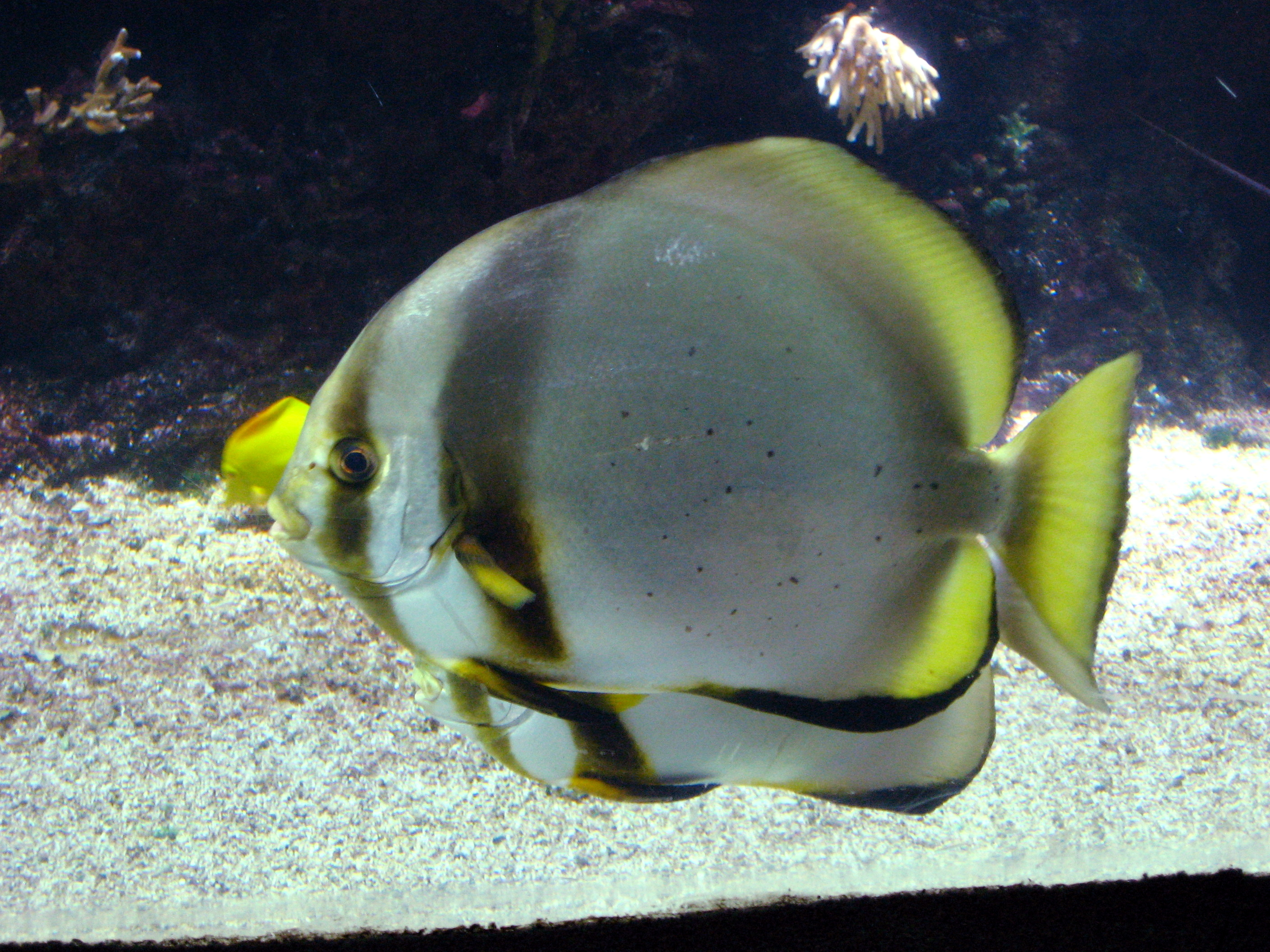
- Adult
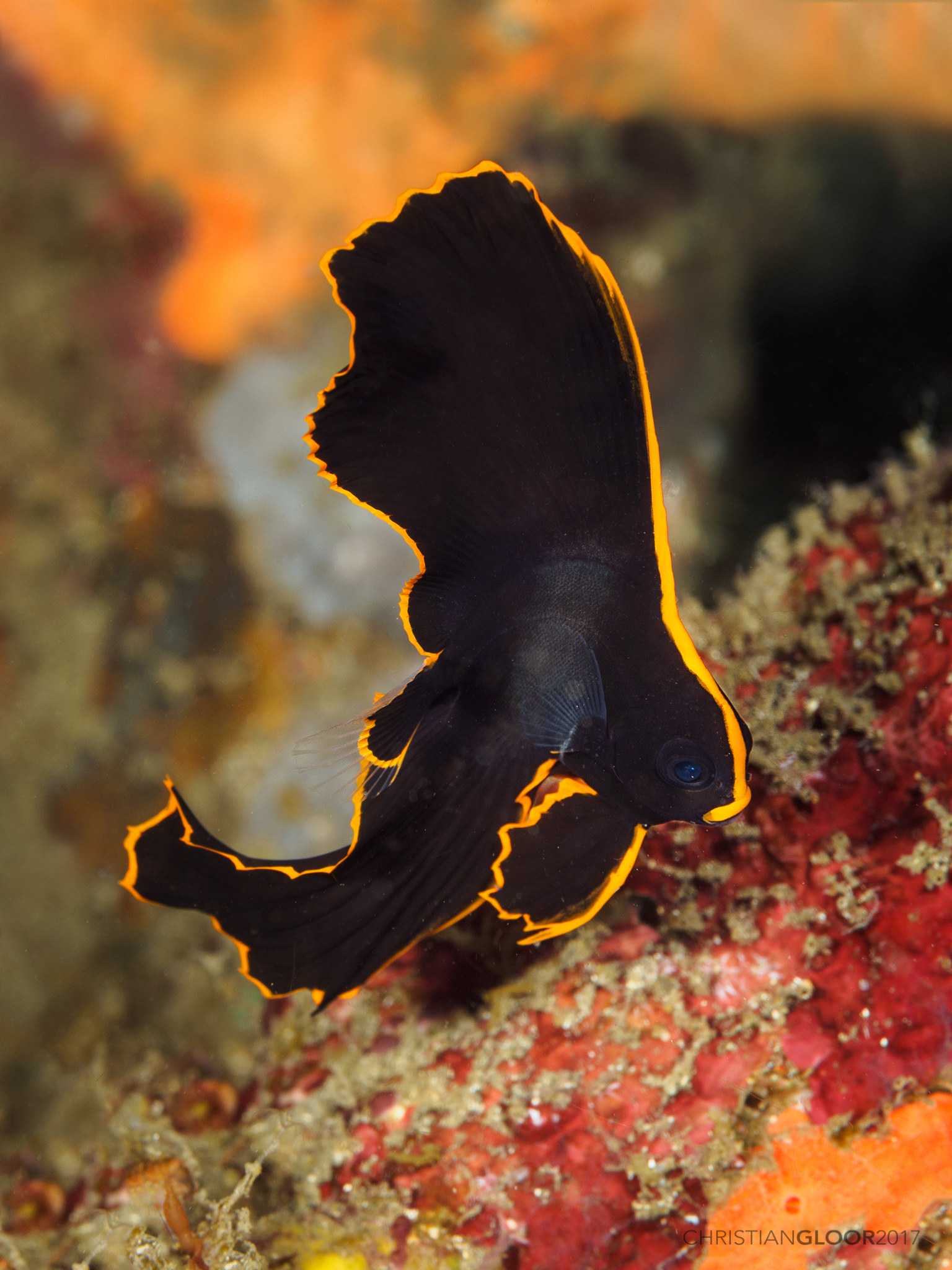
- Juvenile

Conservation status
- Least Concern (IUCN 3.1)

Scientific classification
- Kingdom: Animalia
- Phylum: Chordata
- Class: Actinopterygii
- Division: Teleostei
- Order: Acanthuriformes
- Family: Ephippidae
- Genus: Platax
- Species: P. pinnatus

Binomial name
- Platax pinnatus (Linnaeus, 1758)

Synonyms
- Chaetodon pinnatus Linnaeus, 1758

= Platax pinnatus =

Pinnate batfish

Species of fish

Platax pinnatus, also known as the longfin batfish, pinnate spadefish, pinnate batfish, pinnatus batfish, dusky batfish, shaded batfish, or red-faced batfish is a species of marine ray-finned fish belonging to the family Ephippidae, the spadefishes and batfishes. This species is found in the western Pacific Ocean and occasionally is kept in marine aquariums.

== Taxonomy ==
Platax pinnatus was first formally described as Chaetodon pinnatus in 1758 by Carl Linnaeus in the 10th edition of Systema Naturae with its type locality given as "the Indies". This species is classified within the genus Platax which belongs to the family Ephippidae in the order Moroniformes. The specific name, pinnatus, means "finned" and is an allusion to the very long dorsal and anal fins, particularly in juveniles.

== Description ==
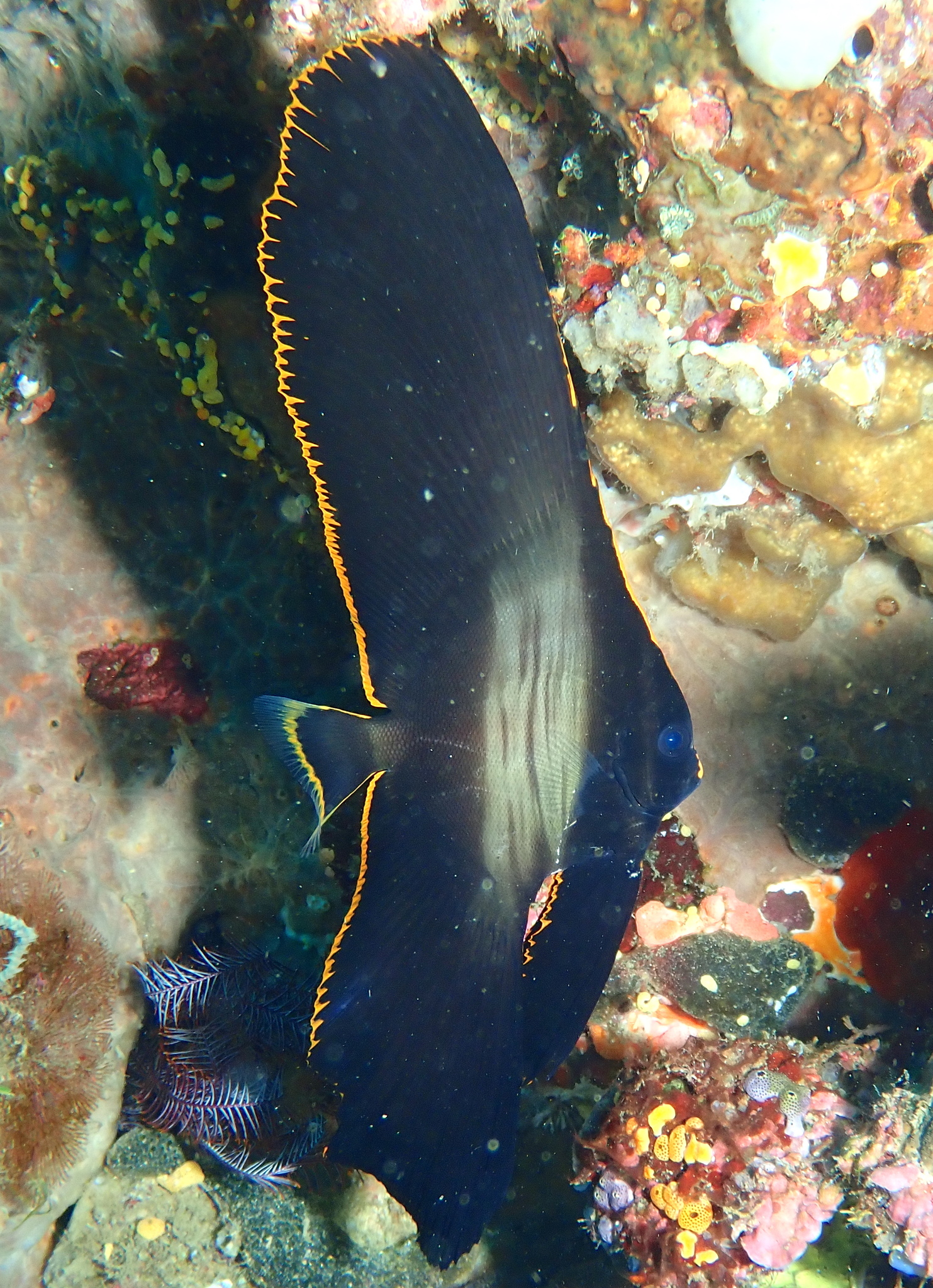
Older juvenile

Platax pinnatus adults have a round, strongly compressed body which has a depth of twice the length of the head. This species reaches a maximum published total length of 45 cm (18 in). Larger adults, with a standard length in excess of 35 cm (14 in) have a protruding snout and a concave dorsal profile of the head. Both jaws have bands of thin, flattened, tricuspid teeth with the central cusp being around two times as long as the lateral cusps. There are vomerine teeth but no palatine teeth. The dorsal fin is supported by 5 or 6 spines and between 34 and 37 soft rays while the anal fin contains 3 spines and 24 to 28 soft rays. The overall colour is silvery with a dusky or dark vertical bar running through the eye and a second similar bar running through the base of the pectoral fin. The dorsal, anal and caudal fins are yellow.

The juveniles are mainly black with the body and median fins outlined in orange and the dorsal and anal fins are greatly elongated.

== Distribution and habitat ==
Platax pinnatus is found in the Indo-West Pacific although FishBase notes that records from the Indian Ocean, other than Australia, are subject to some doubt. The confirmed range is in the western Pacific from the Ryukyu Islands south to Australia. In Australia, it has been recorded from off the central coast of Western Australia, around the tropical northern coasts and south along the east coast to the central coast of New South Wales. The adults are found under the overhangs of steep outer reef slopes down to depths greater than 20 m (66 ft). The juveniles are found among mangroves or sheltering in caves and under ledges in inner protected reefs.

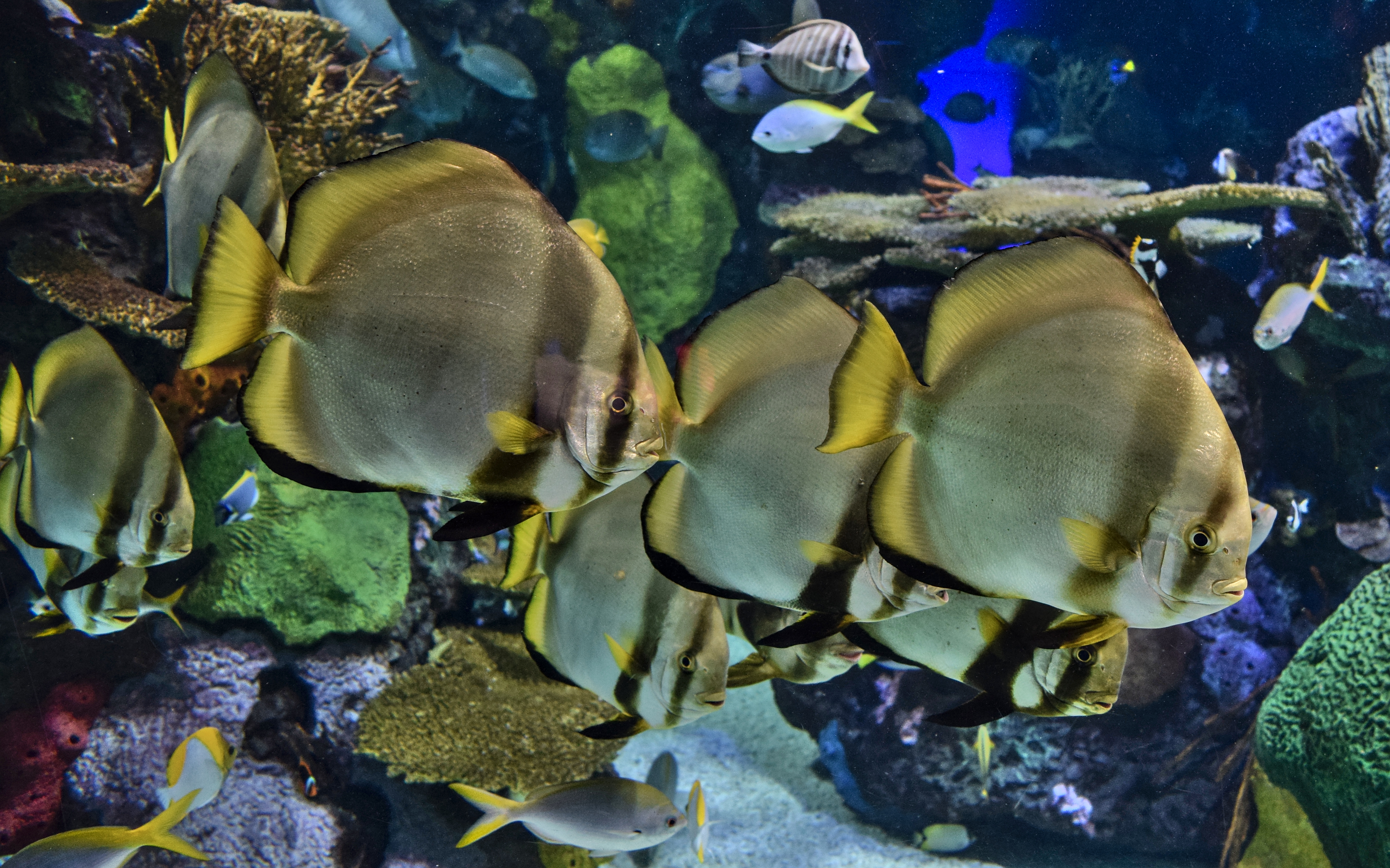
Schooling adults

== Biology ==
Platax pinnatus adults are normally solitary but will gather in large schools to move over open substrates. The juveniles are mimics of a toxic species of flatworm by colour and shape. They feed on algae as well as jellyfish and other gelatinous zooplankton. This species has been observed to significantly reduce algal growths on coral in studies simulating the effects of overfishing on the Great Barrier Reef.

== Utilisation ==
Platax pinnatus is kept in aquaria but is difficult to maintain. These fishes are caught by fishers using hook and line, palisade traps, spears, trawls, and hand nets; the flesh is palatable, but not valued.

== Gallery ==
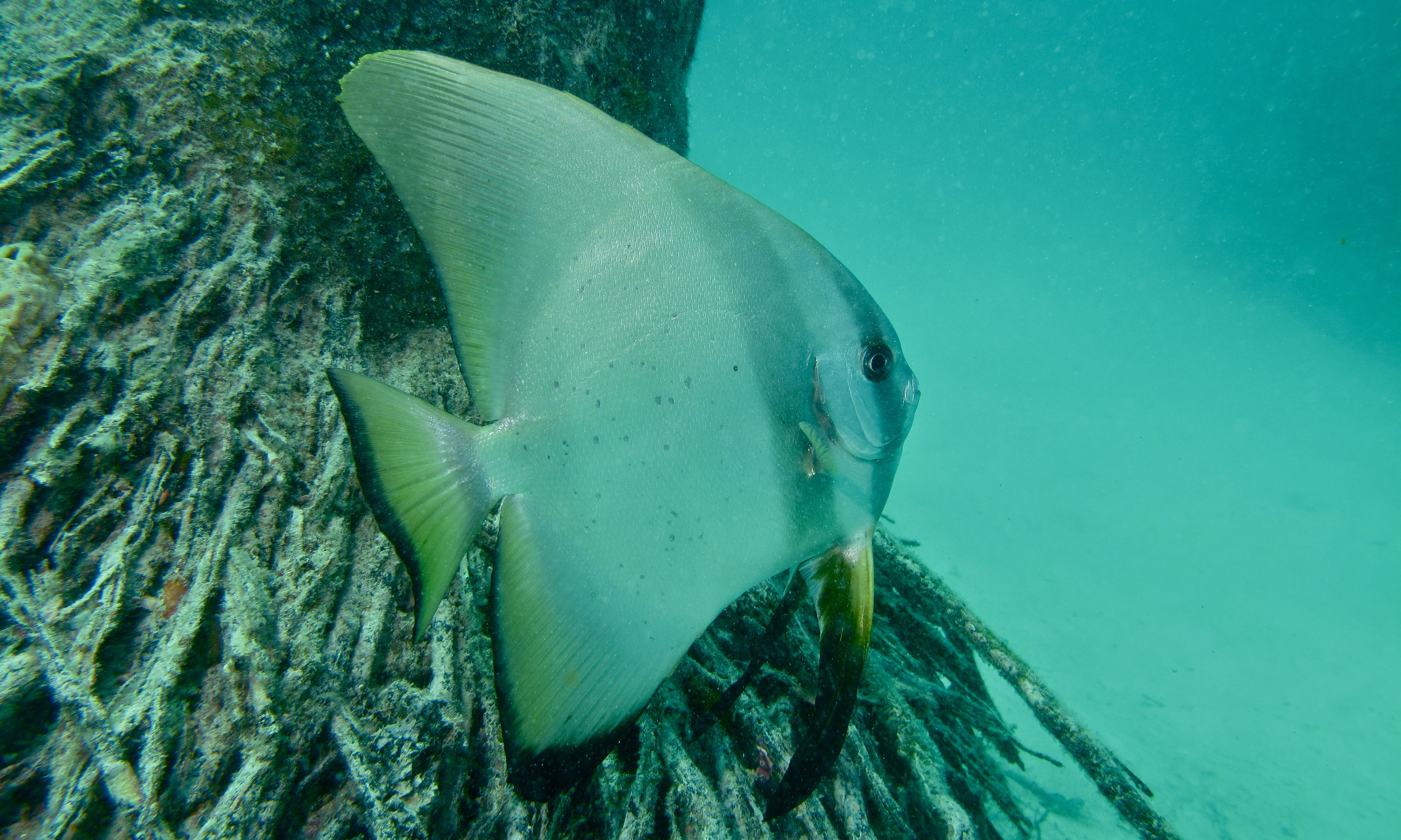

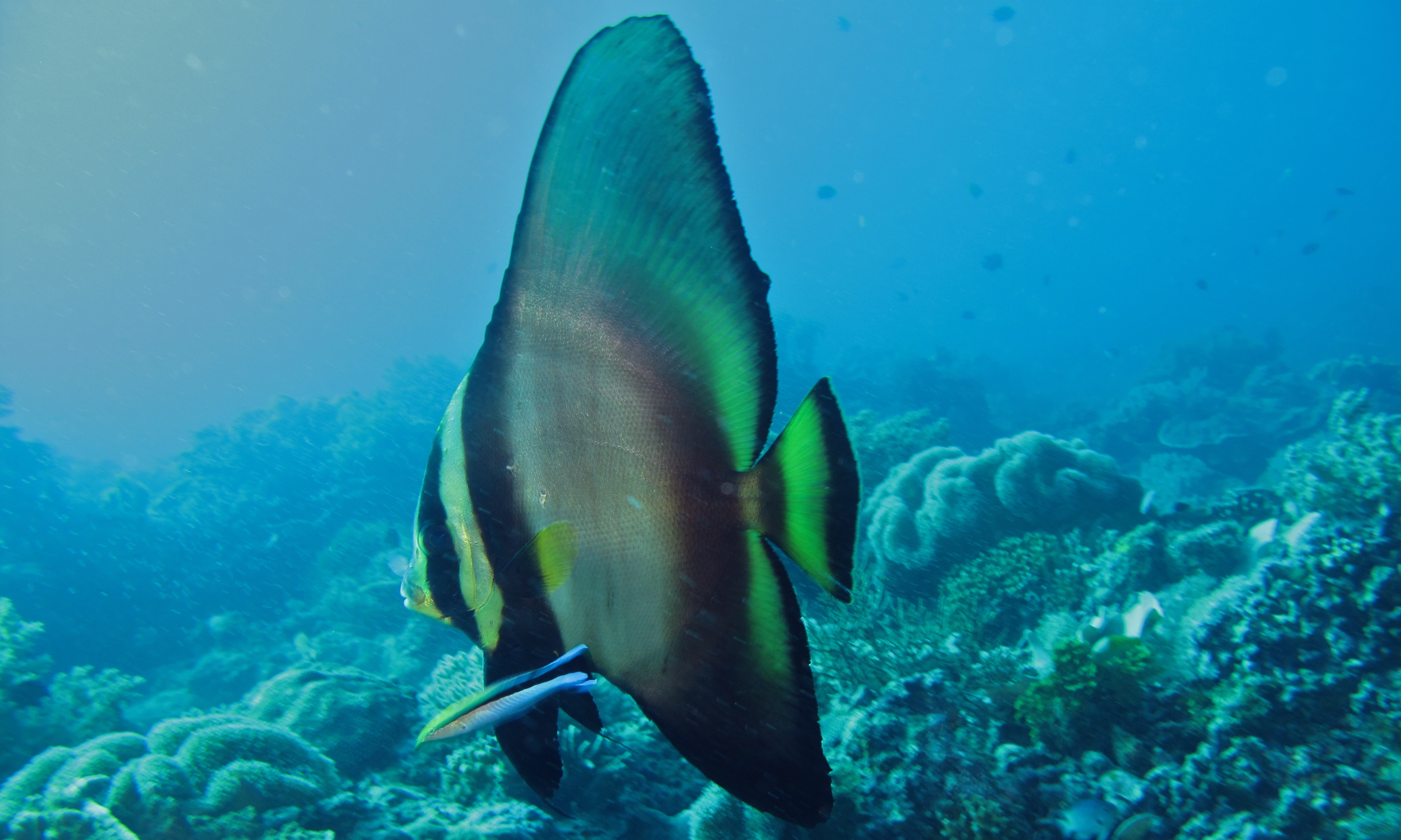

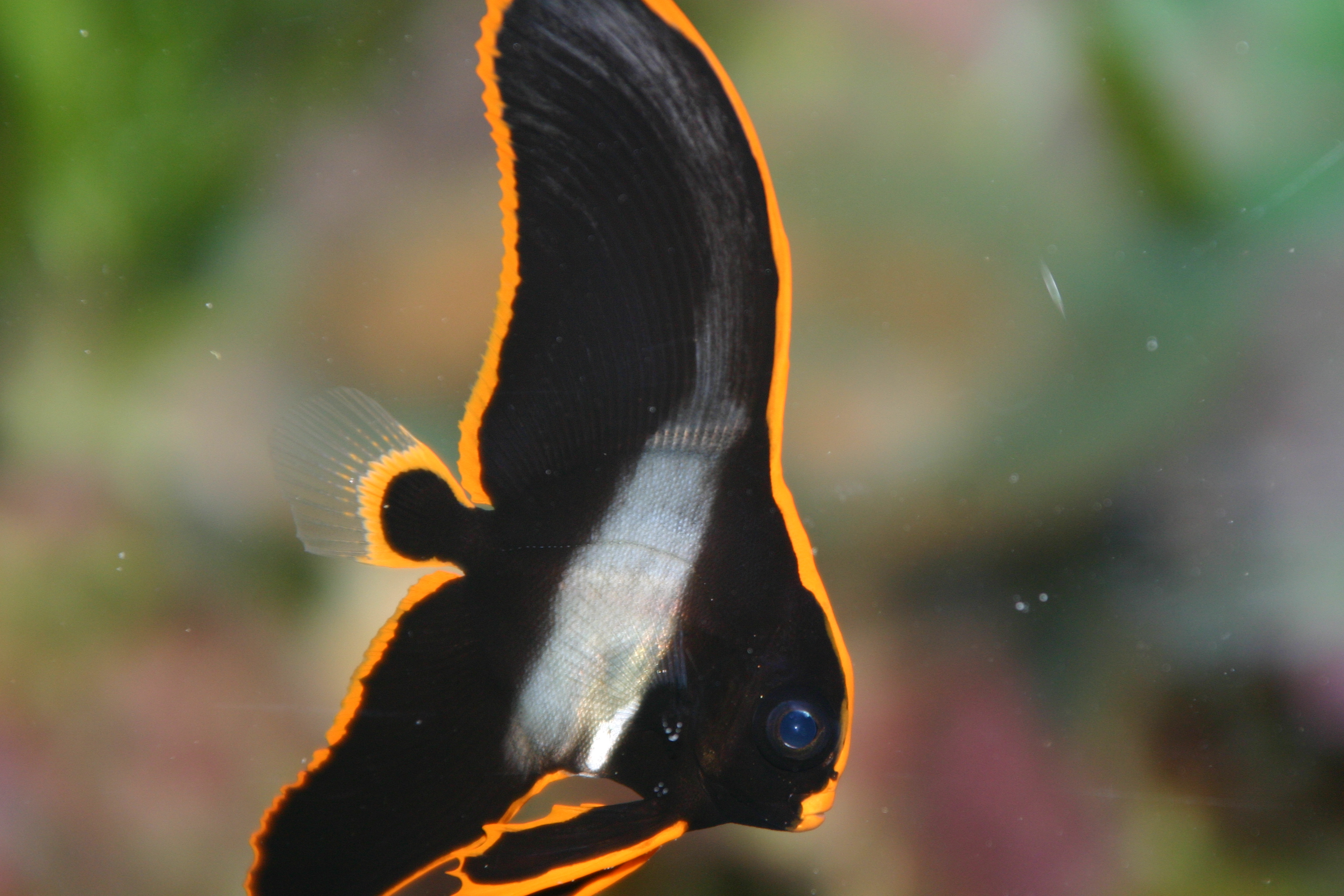

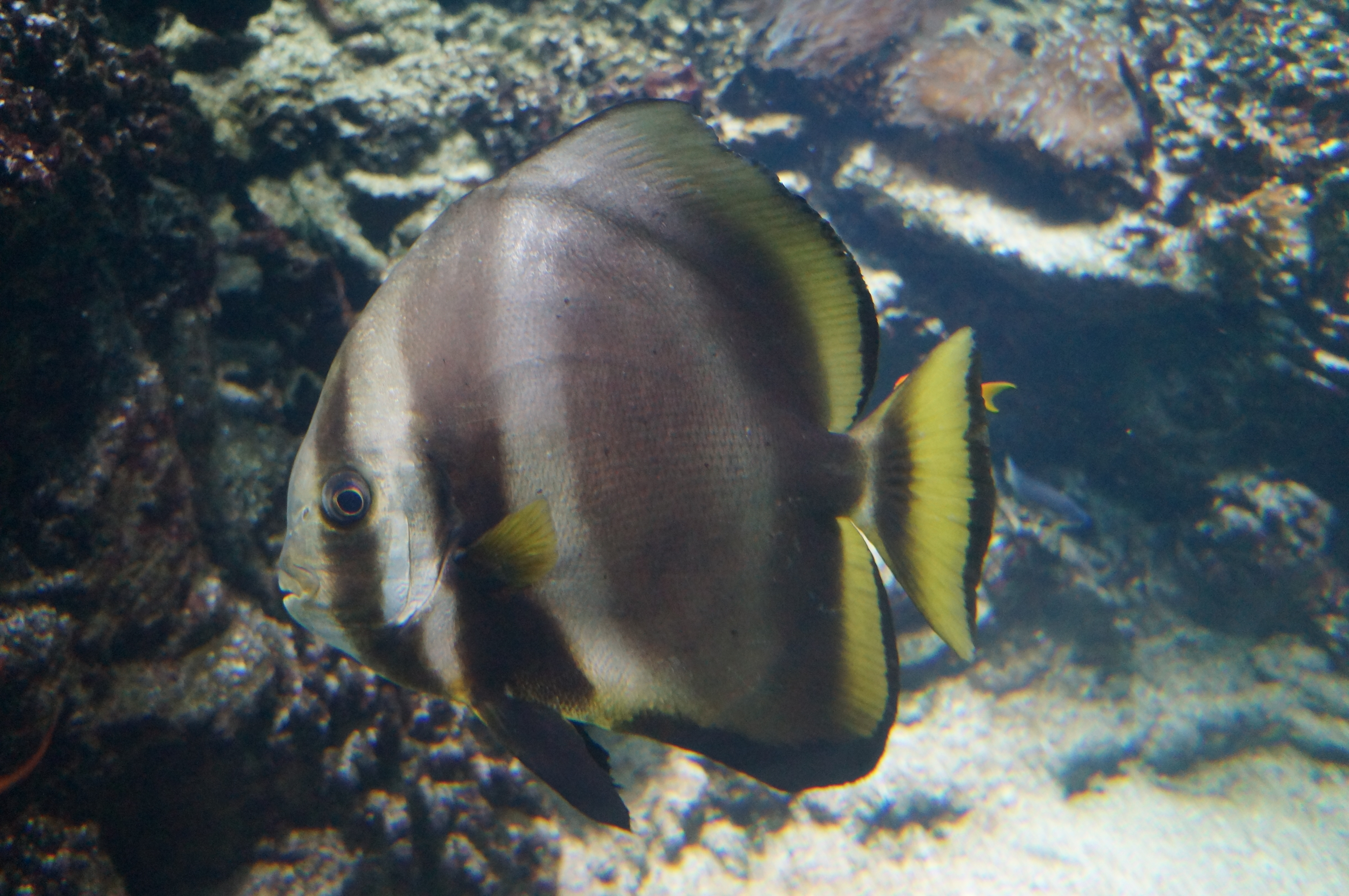

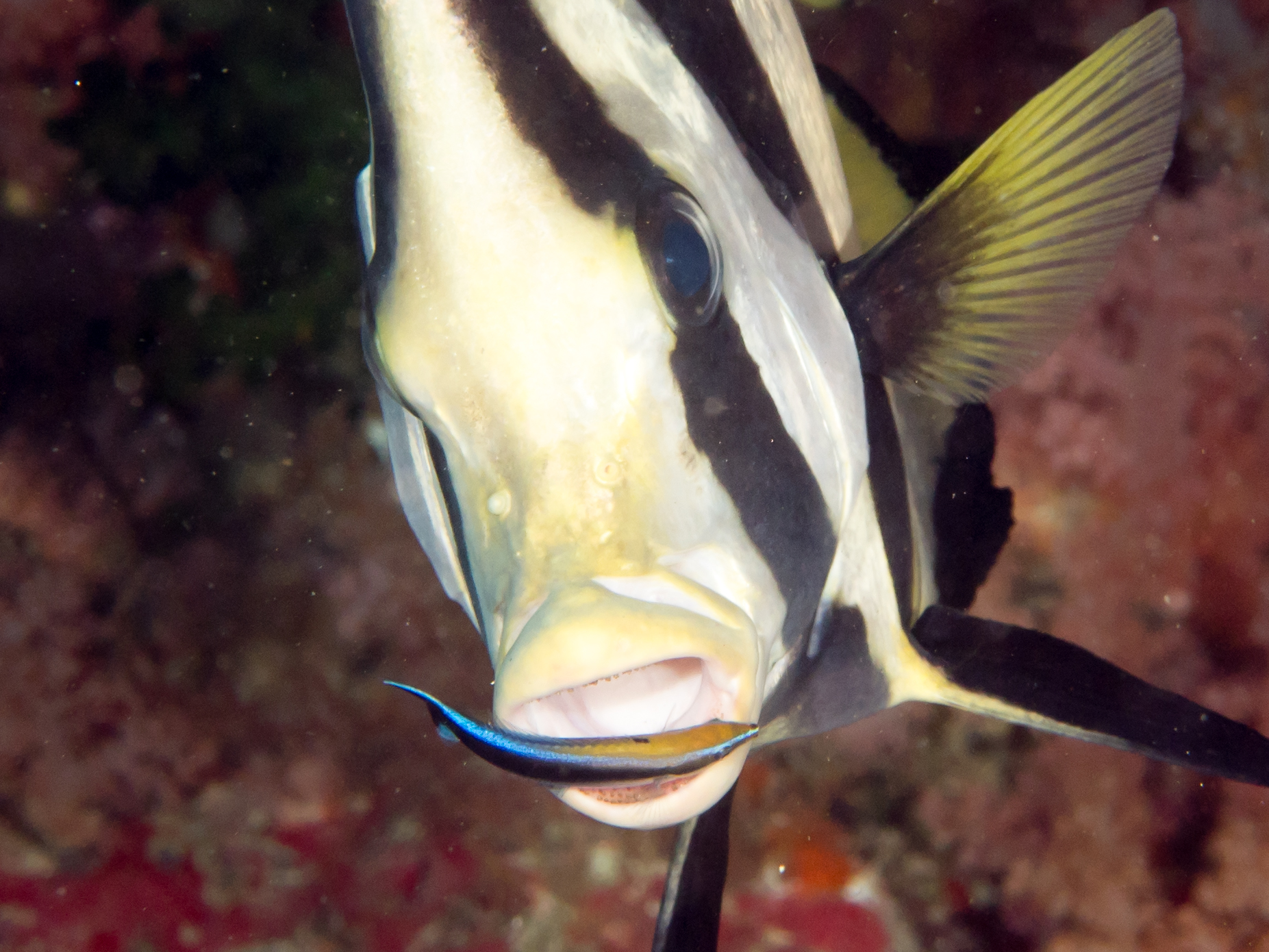
With cleaner wrasse
