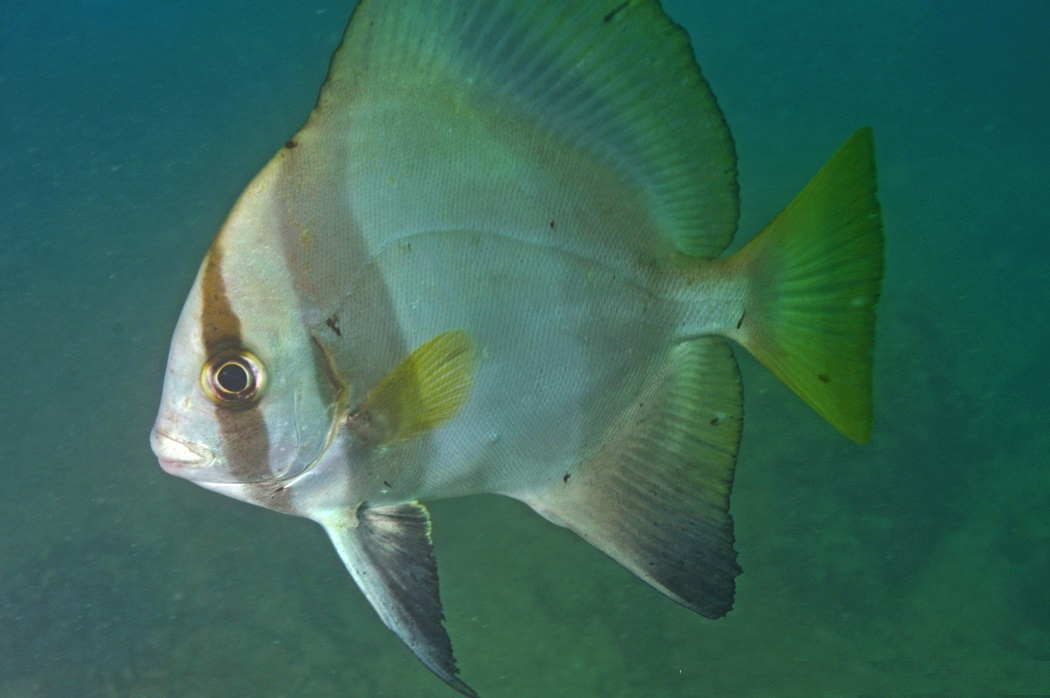
- Adult
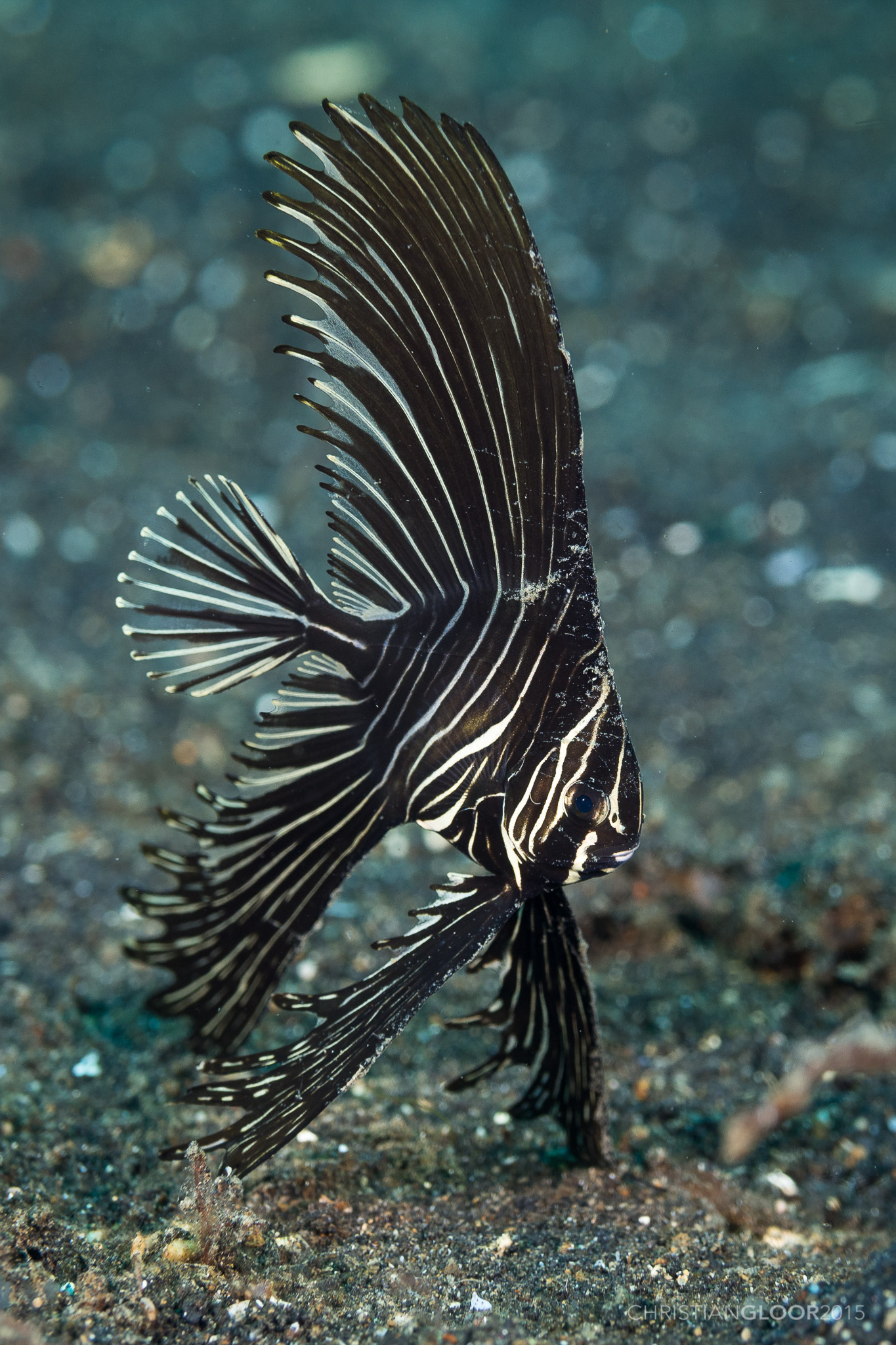
- Juvenile

Scientific classification
- Kingdom: Animalia
- Phylum: Chordata
- Class: Actinopterygii
- Order: Acanthuriformes
- Family: Ephippidae
- Genus: Platax
- Species: P. batavianus

Binomial name
- Platax batavianus Cuvier, 1831

= Platax batavianus =

Humpback batfish

Species of fish

Platax batavianus, the humpback batfish, Batavian batfish, batfish, humped batfish, hump-headed hatfish, moonfish or zebra batfish, is a species of marine ray-finned fish in the family Ephippidae, the spadefishes and batfishes. They are found in coral reefs around the Indo-Pacific region. Adults can grow up to 65 centimetres (26 in) at maximum.

== Classification ==
Platax batavianus was first formally described in 1831 by the French zoologist Georges Cuvier with its type locality given as Jakarta. This species is classified within the genus Platax in the family Ephippidae. The specific name refers to the type locality of Batavia, the colonial name for Jakarta.

== Distribution and habitat ==
Platax batavianus is found in coral reefs around the Indo-Pacific. They are found in eastern Africa, Madagascar, Seychelles, the Maldives, India, Sri Lanka, the Andaman Sea, Indonesia, and Australia in the Indian Ocean. In the Pacific Ocean, they are found in the Gulf of Thailand, Indonesia, Vietnam, Taiwan, Japan, the Philippines, the Great Barrier Reef, New Zealand, and various Pacific islands not including Hawaii. They are encountered at a depth of 5 to 40 metres (16 to 131 ft). It lives in tropical waters.

== Description ==
Platax batavianus adults can grow up to 65 centimetres (26 in) at maximum size. Juveniles and adults have different coloration. Adults are silver with a dark bar around the eye and a faint one on the back. They have brown fins and are shaped like an oval. Juveniles are brown and are tall in appearance. They have vertical white bars. Their snouts are concave. It has tricuspid teeth and has strong jaws.

== Biology ==
Platax batavianus is a solitary species, but may be infrequently encountered as pairs or in small groups. The small juveniles can be found in deeper water where their zebra-like striping camouflages them when they shelter among crinoids.
