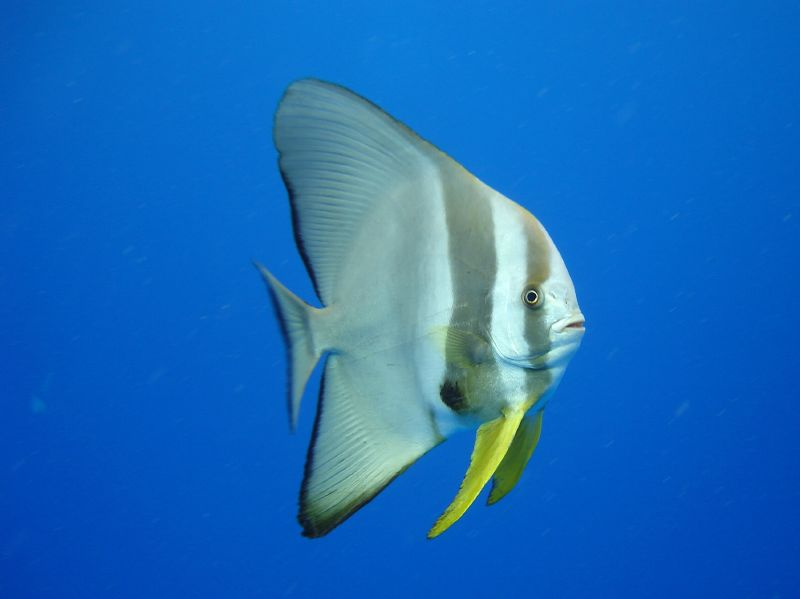

Conservation status
- Least Concern (IUCN 3.1)

Scientific classification
- Kingdom: Animalia
- Phylum: Chordata
- Class: Actinopterygii
- Division: Teleostei
- Order: Acanthuriformes
- Family: Ephippidae
- Genus: Platax
- Species: P. teira

Binomial name
- Platax teira (Forsskål, 1775)

Synonyms
- Chaetodon teira Forsskål, 1775

= Platax teira =

Longfin batfish

Species of fish

Platax teira, also known as the teira batfish, longfin batfish, longfin spadefish, or round faced batfish is a species of marine ray-finned fish belonging to the family Ephippidae, the spadefishes and batfishes. This species is found in the Indo-West Pacific.

== Taxonomy ==
Platax teira was first formally described as Chaetodon teira by the Swedish-speaking Finnish explorer, orientalist, naturalist Peter Forsskål with its type locality given as Al Luḩayyah on the Red Sea coast of Yemen. This species was designated as the type species of the genus Platax by Pieter Bleeker in 1876, Platax belongs to the family Ephippidae in the order Moroniformes. The specific name teira is a latinisation of the Arabic teyra the name given to the juveniles in Yemen.

== Distribution and habitat ==
Platax teira has a wide Indo-Pacific distribution from the Red Sea and East Africa to Papua New Guinea, north to the Ryukyu Islands, south to Australia. It has also been recorded in the Bay of Islands in New Zealand. In Australia it can be found from the central coast of Western Australia, around the tropical north of the country and south to the southern coast of New South Wales. In India it was reported from the Gulf of Mannar following the 2004 Indian Ocean earthquake and tsunami. It has been reported twice recently in the Mediterranean Sea, off Turkey and Israel.

They are known to reside among floating seaweed, debris, and artificial reefs. The species occurs in shallow coastal habitats to deeper offshore.

== Description ==
Platax teira has a dark blotch under the pectoral fin, with another long dark mark above the base of the anal fin. Looked at from the side, it has a roughly circular body with a low hump on the nape. This fish is usually silver, grey or brownish. It has a blackish band through the eye and another band with the pectoral fin. They will change colour from silvery white with no bands, to brown with darker banding as you watch, and then fade back to silver again. This species has a maximum published total length of 70 cm (28 in). The very small juveniles are brownish in colour and look like floating leaves. The larger juveniles have the pelvic fins and front soft rays of the dorsal and anal fins highly elongated, extending to around the posterior of the base of the anal fin.

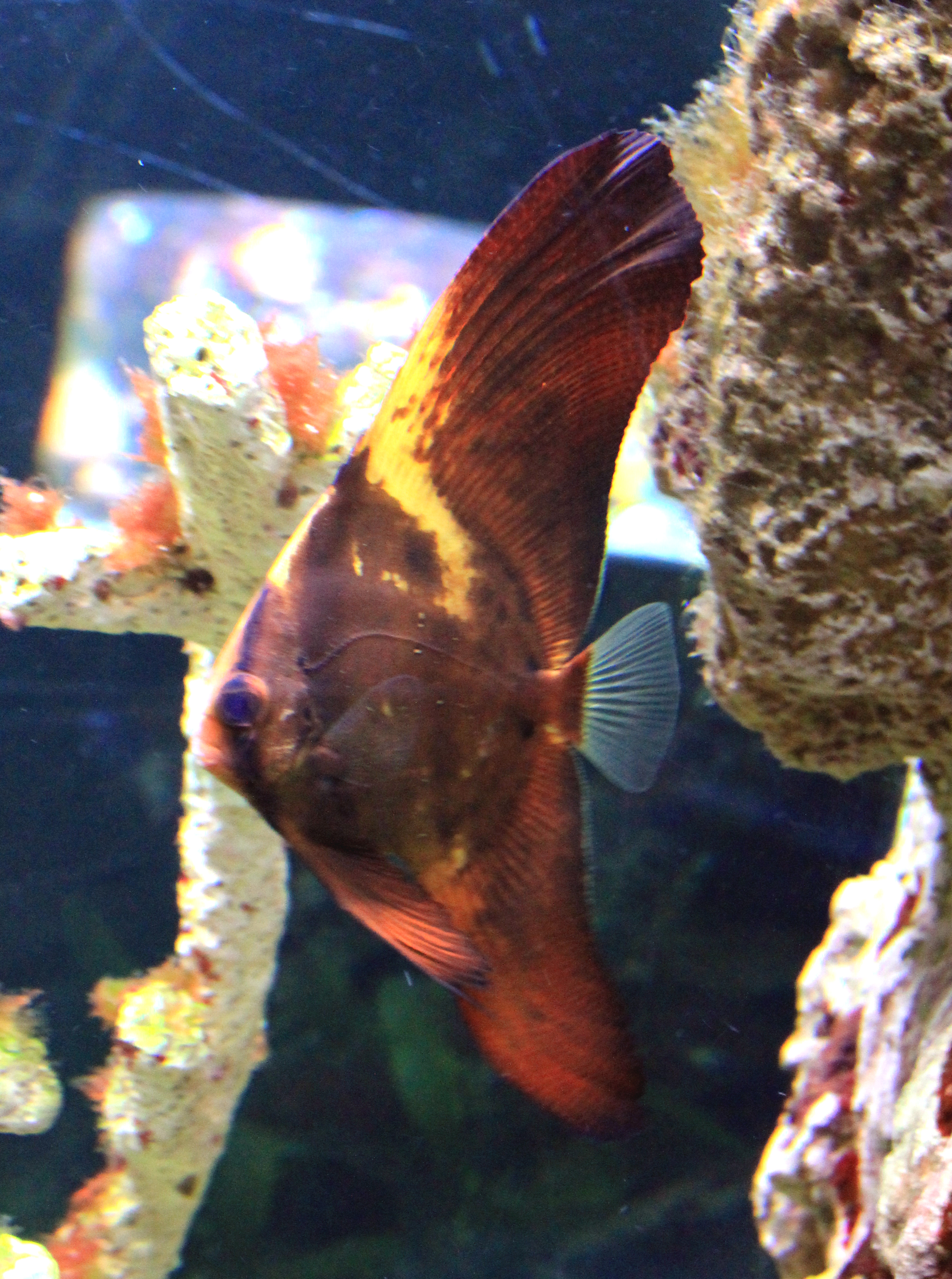
Young juvenile

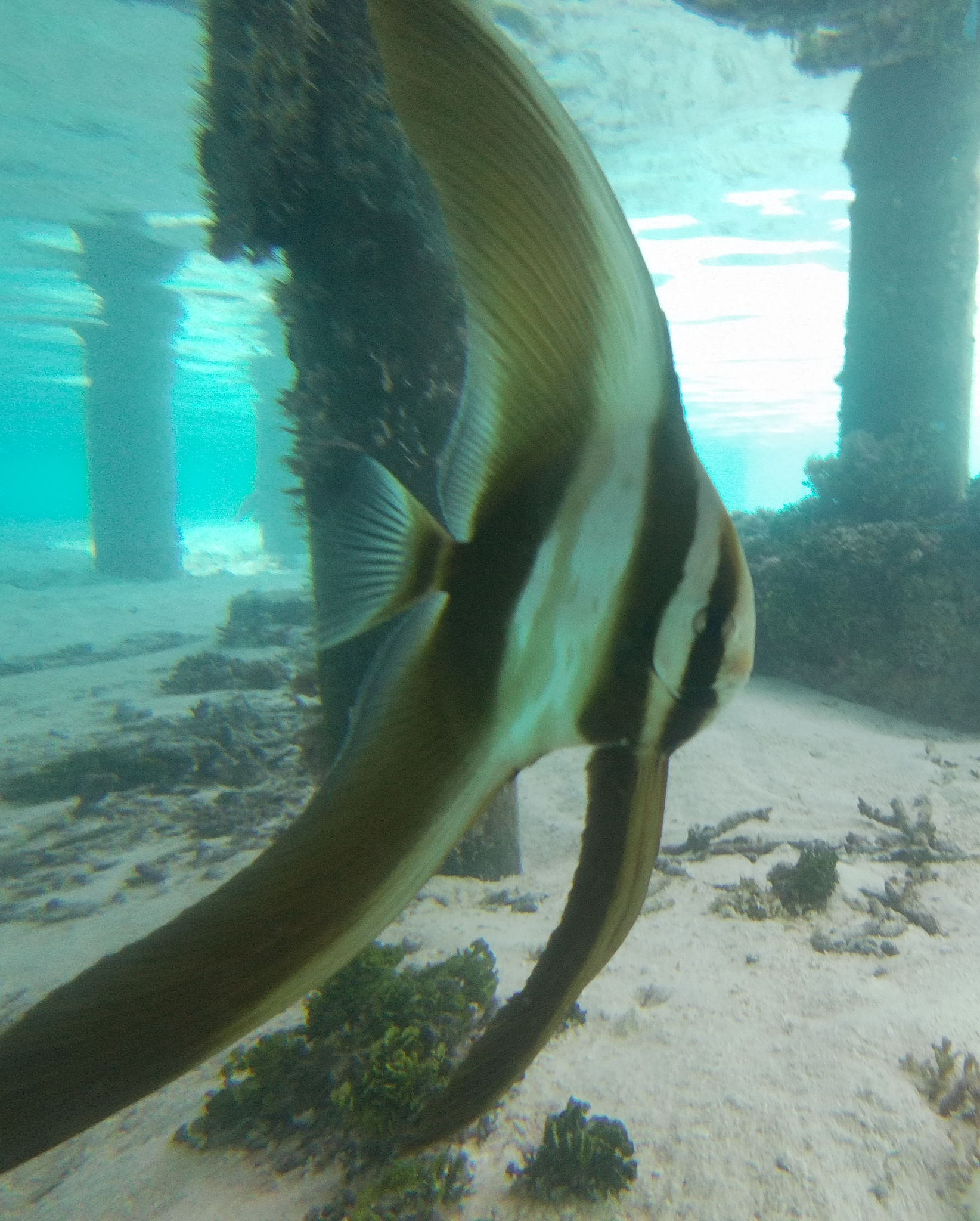
Older juvenile

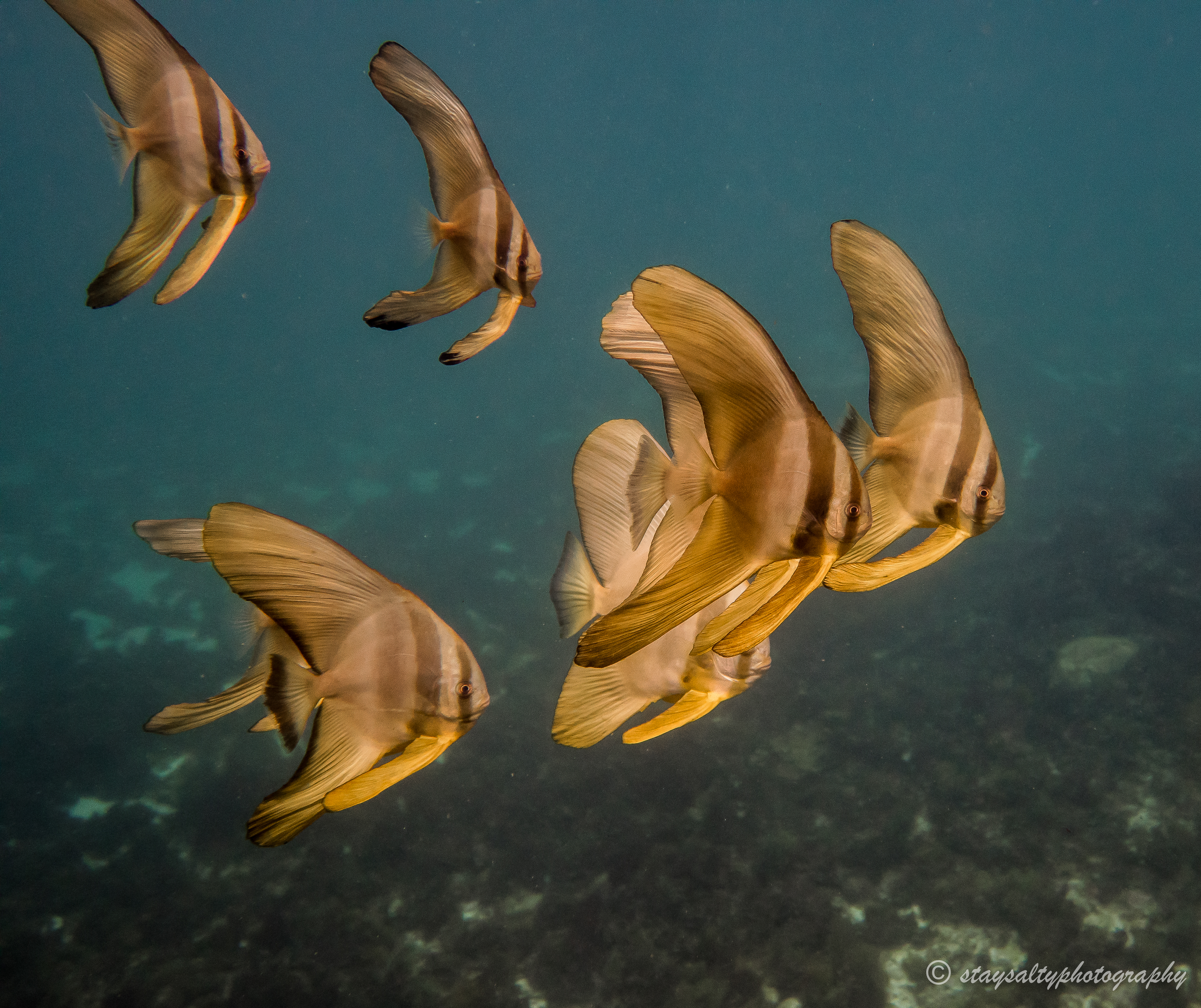
Transitional stage

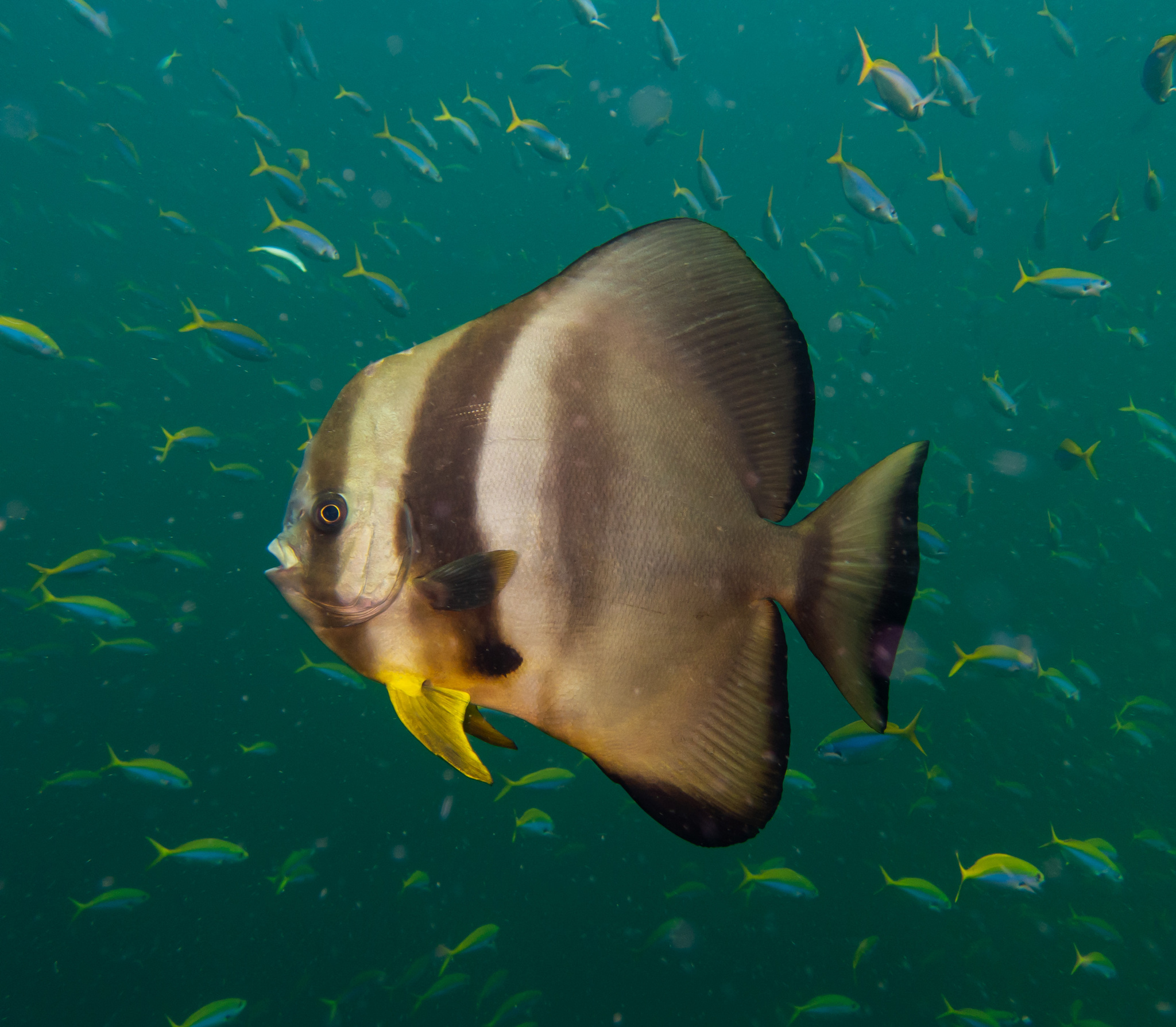
Adult

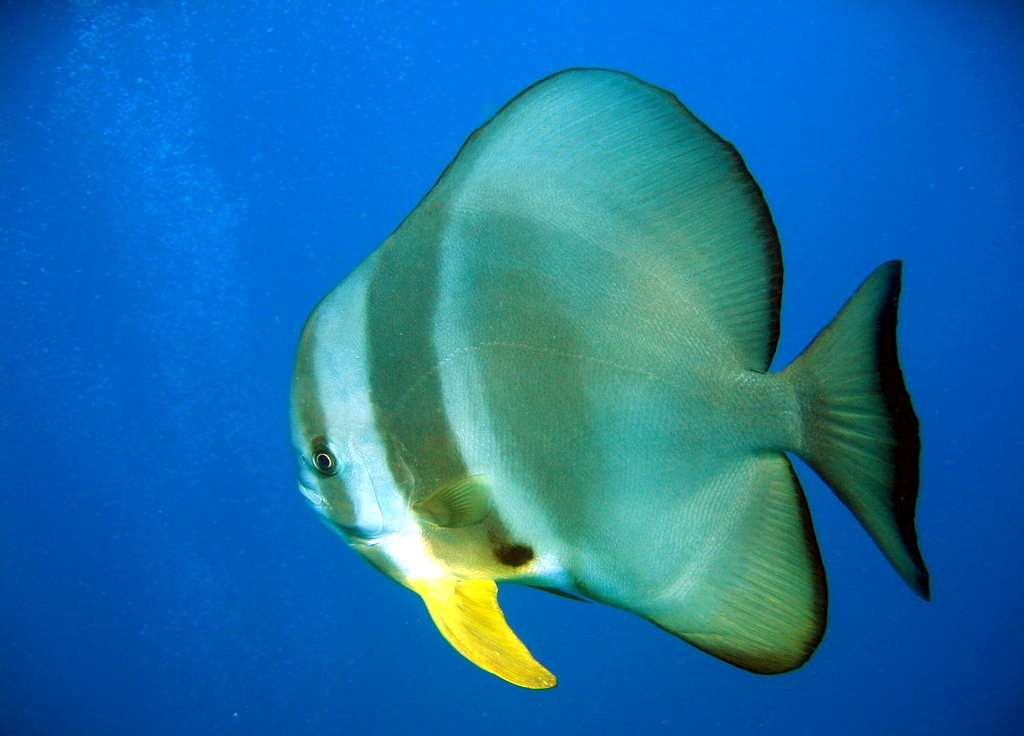
New South Wales, Australia

== Biology ==
Platax teira is an omnivore. It will eat plankton, sessile invertebrates, small invertebrates, and marine algae. The small juveniles stay among floating debris, forming aggregations as the individual fishes find each other. At larger sizes they increasingly become more pelagic and will form sizeable schools which shelter beneath large rafts of Sargassum that typically form following the wet season.

== Utilisation ==
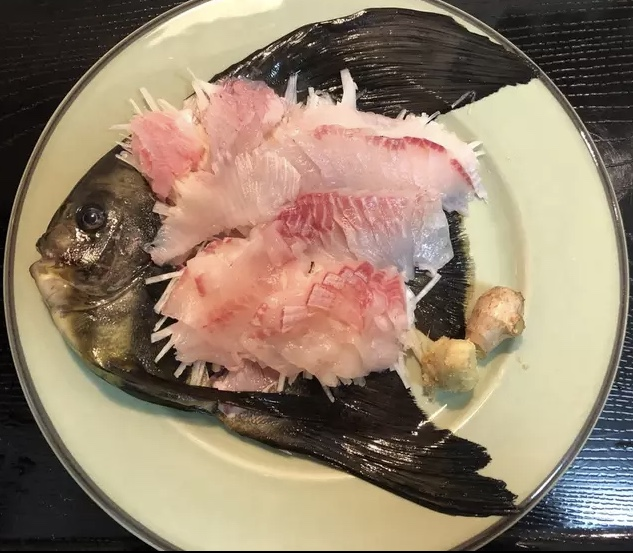
Sashimi

=== In the aquarium ===
They are a very peaceful and social fish and will form schools with others of their species. They should not be kept with very aggressive species that may harass them as juveniles. Teira batfish are usually rather small when first purchased, but they will rapidly outgrow a small home aquarium to reach a maximum size of 24".

=== Fisheries ===
Platax teira is caught using hook-and-line, palisade traps, spear, trawls and hand nets. The flesh is not valued and may have an excellent flavour or taste rank and weedy.

== Gallery ==
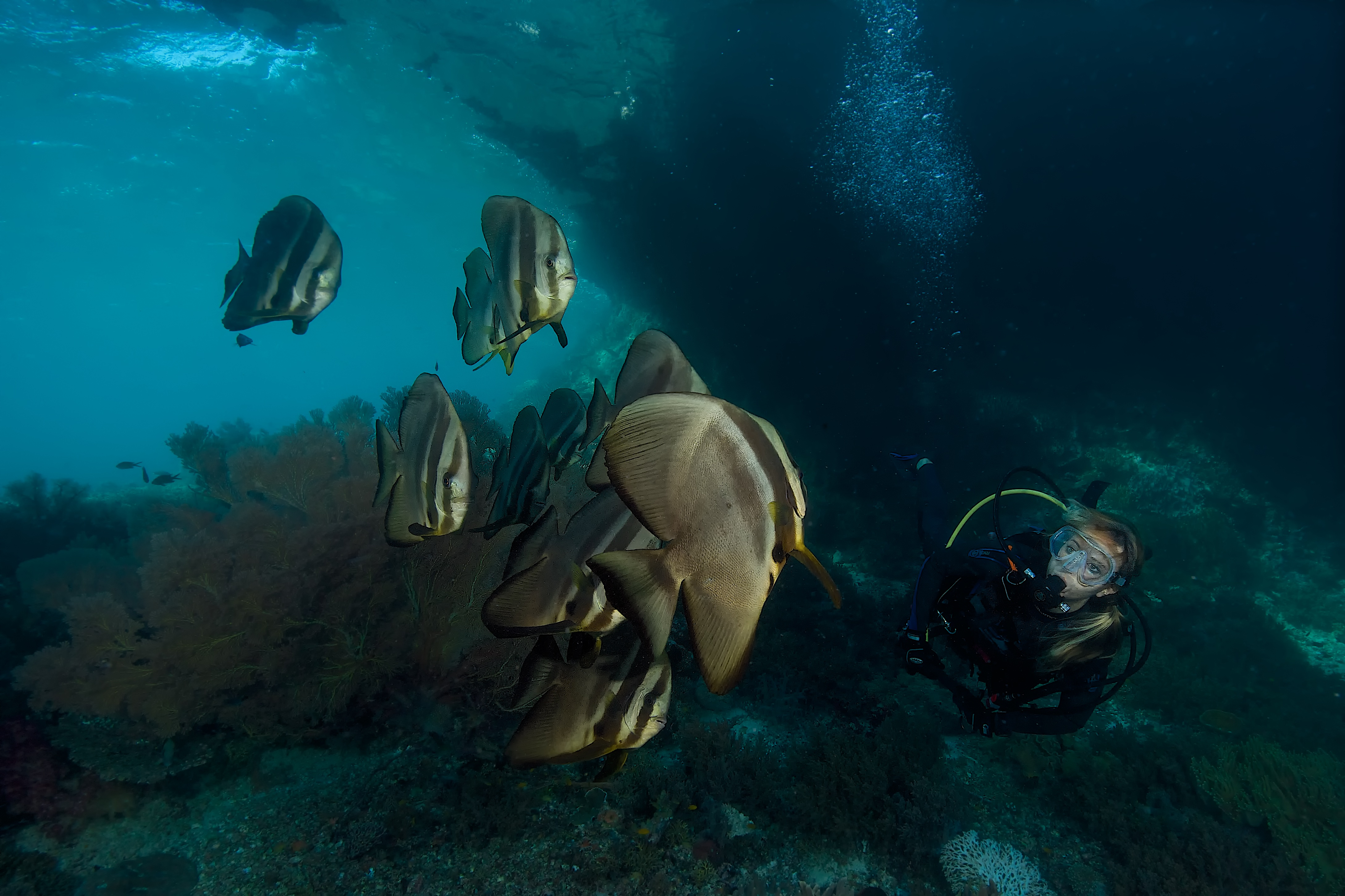
Teira batfish in Raja Ampat Papua, 2014

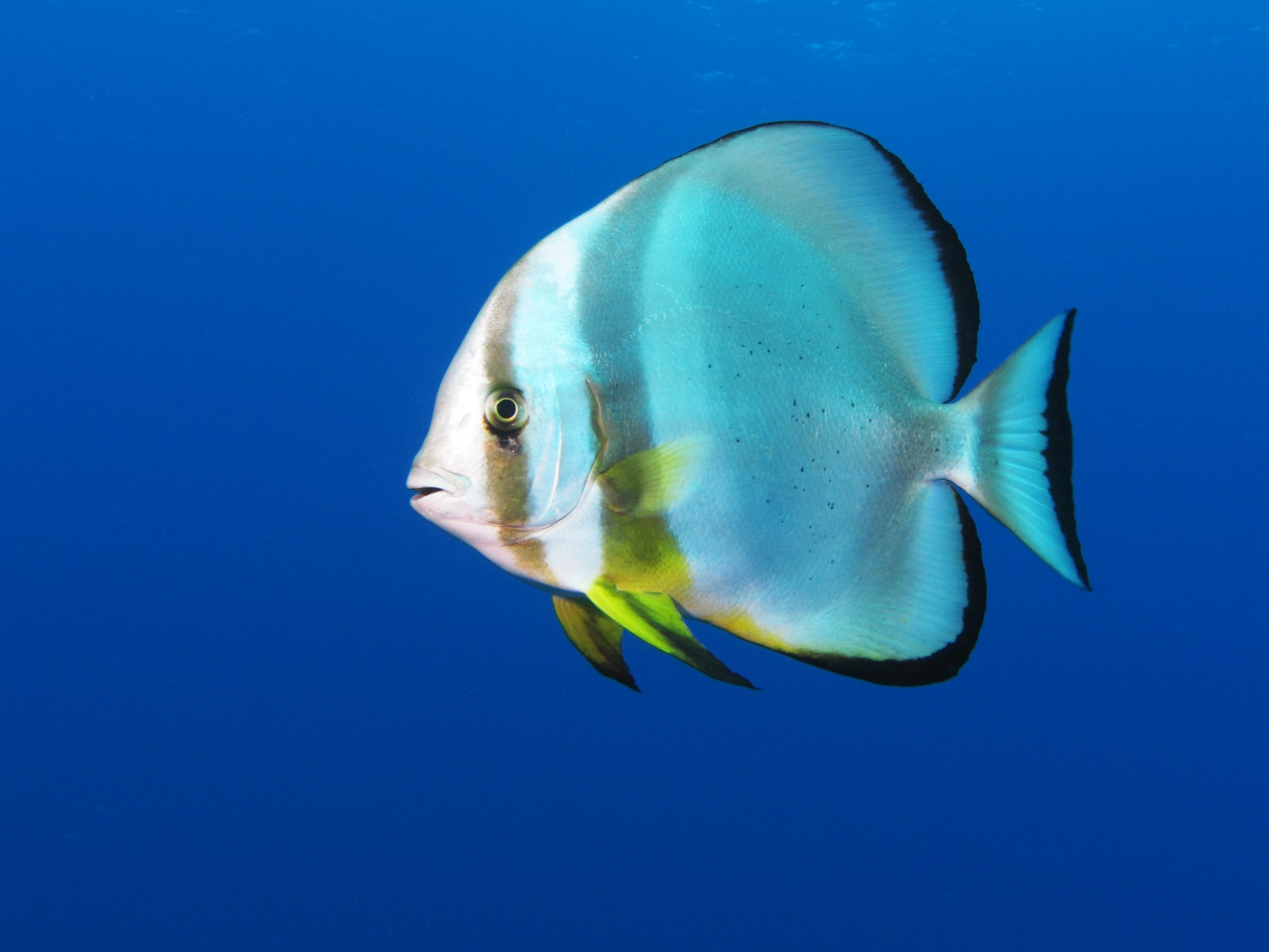
Teira batfish in Egyptian Red Sea, 2010

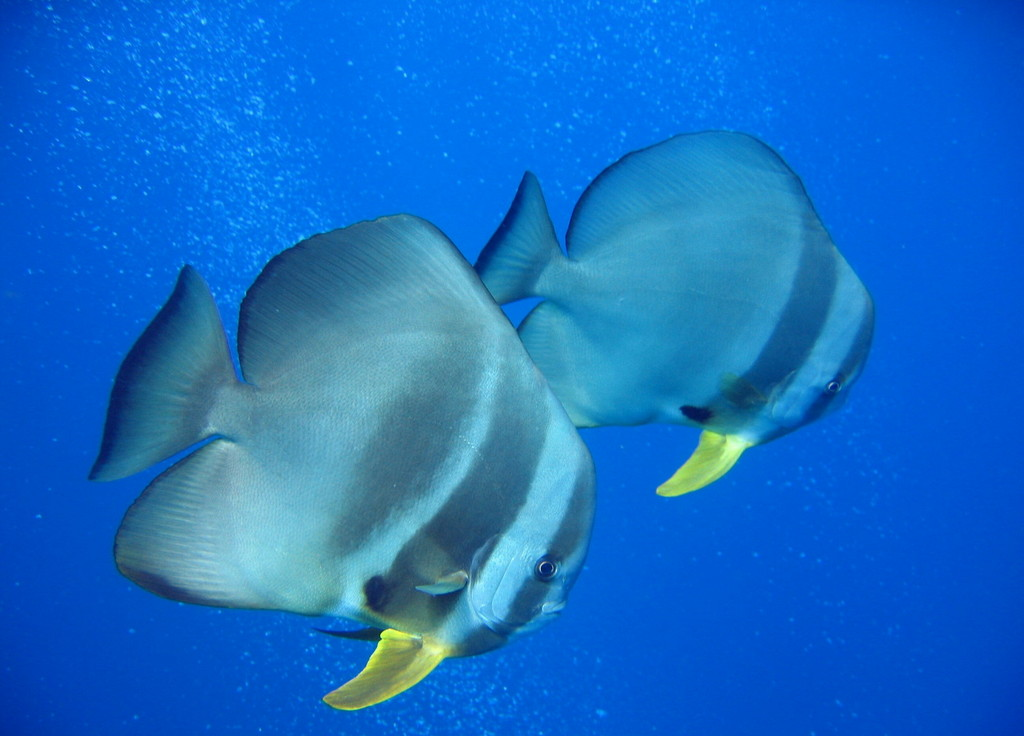
Teira batfish in South West Rocks Australia, 2005

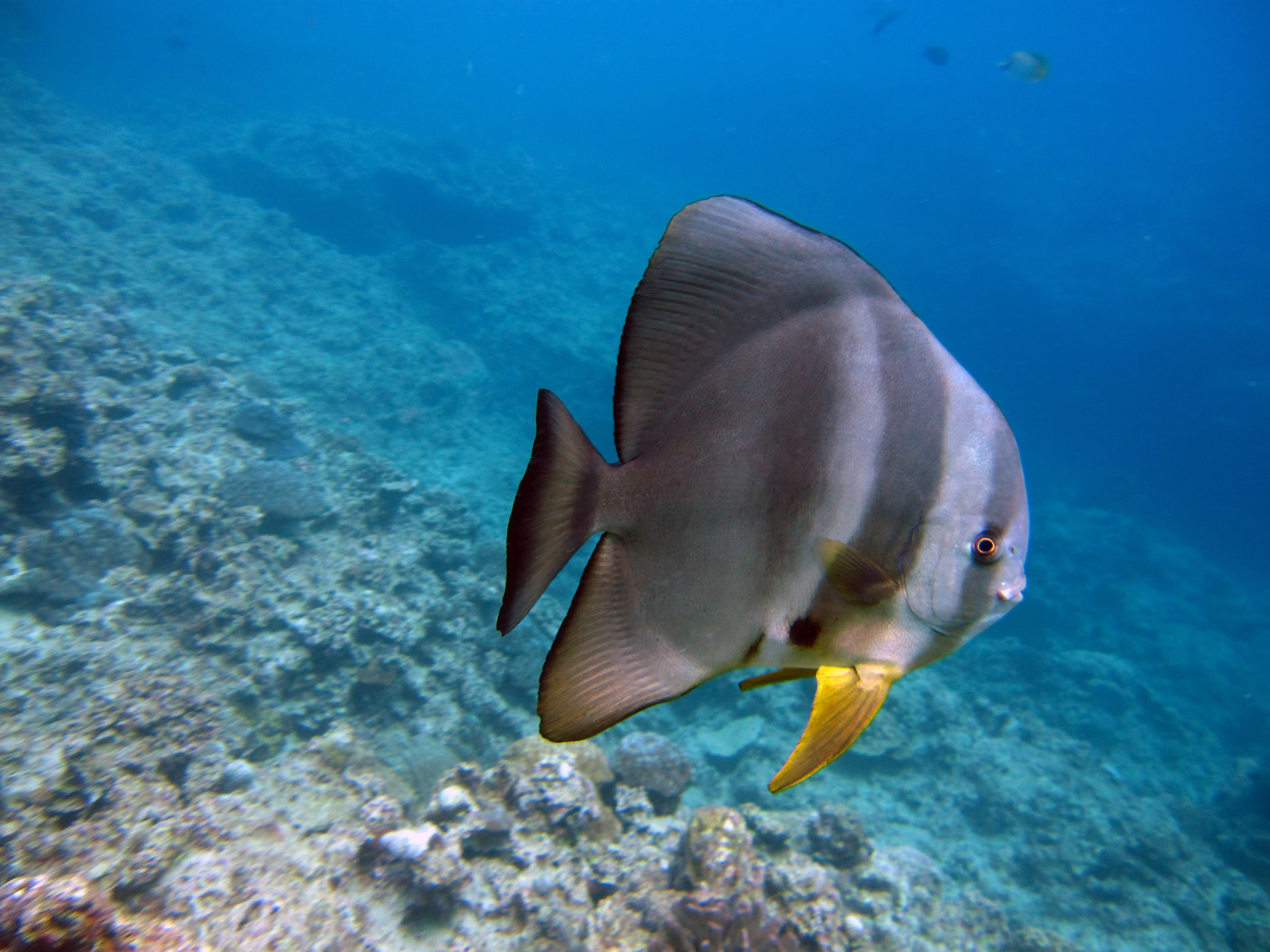
Teira batfish at Maedamisaki Okinawa, 2009

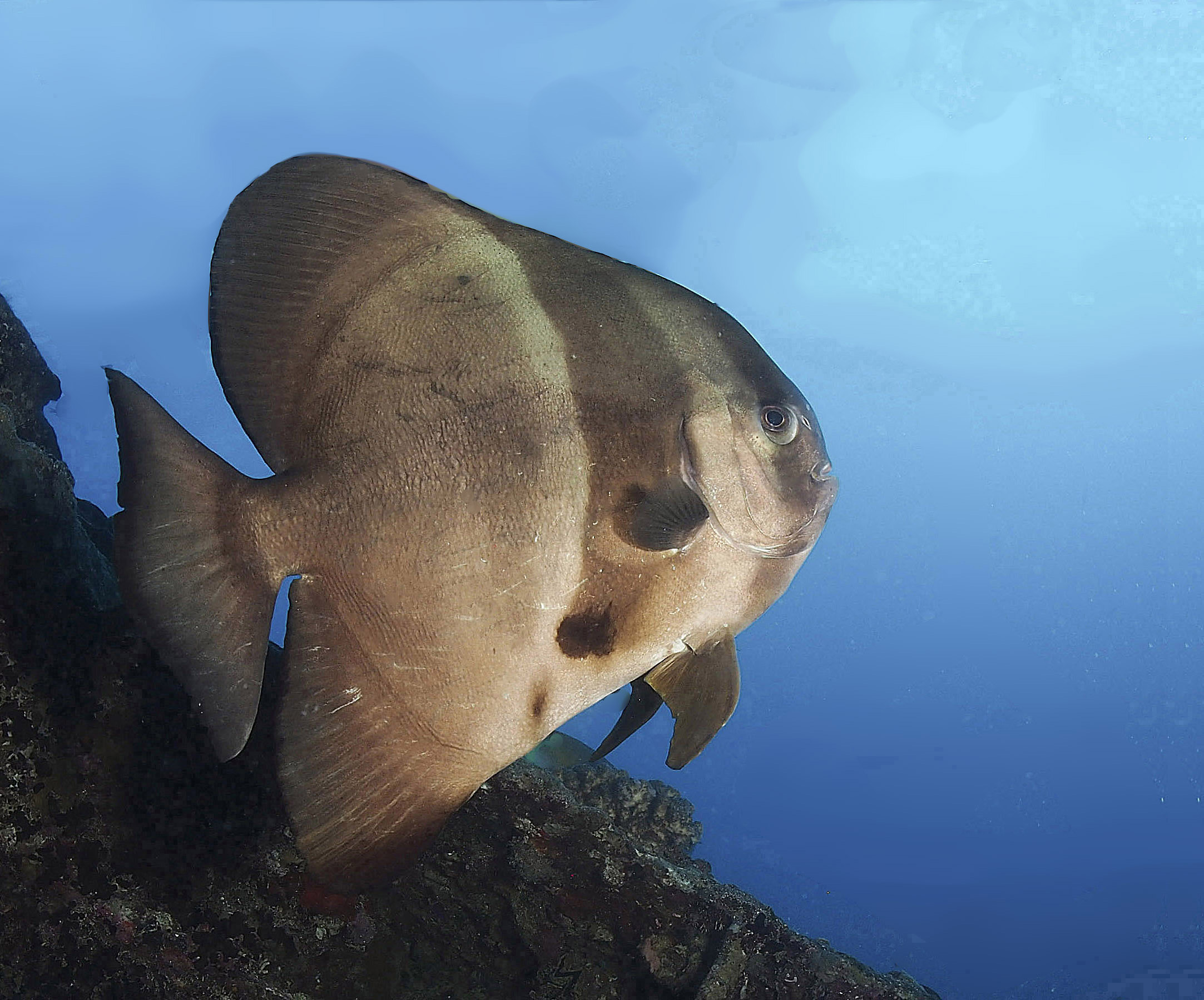
Longfin batfish, 2018

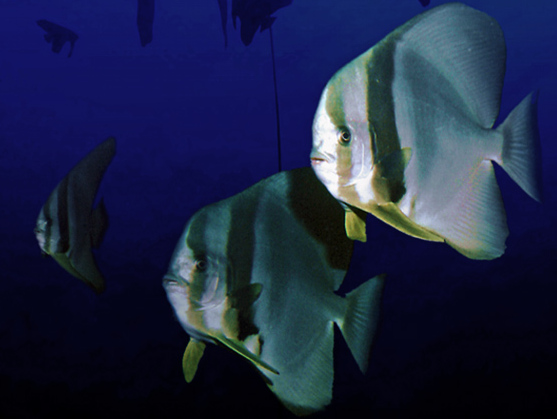
Batfish near Comores, Indian Ocean
