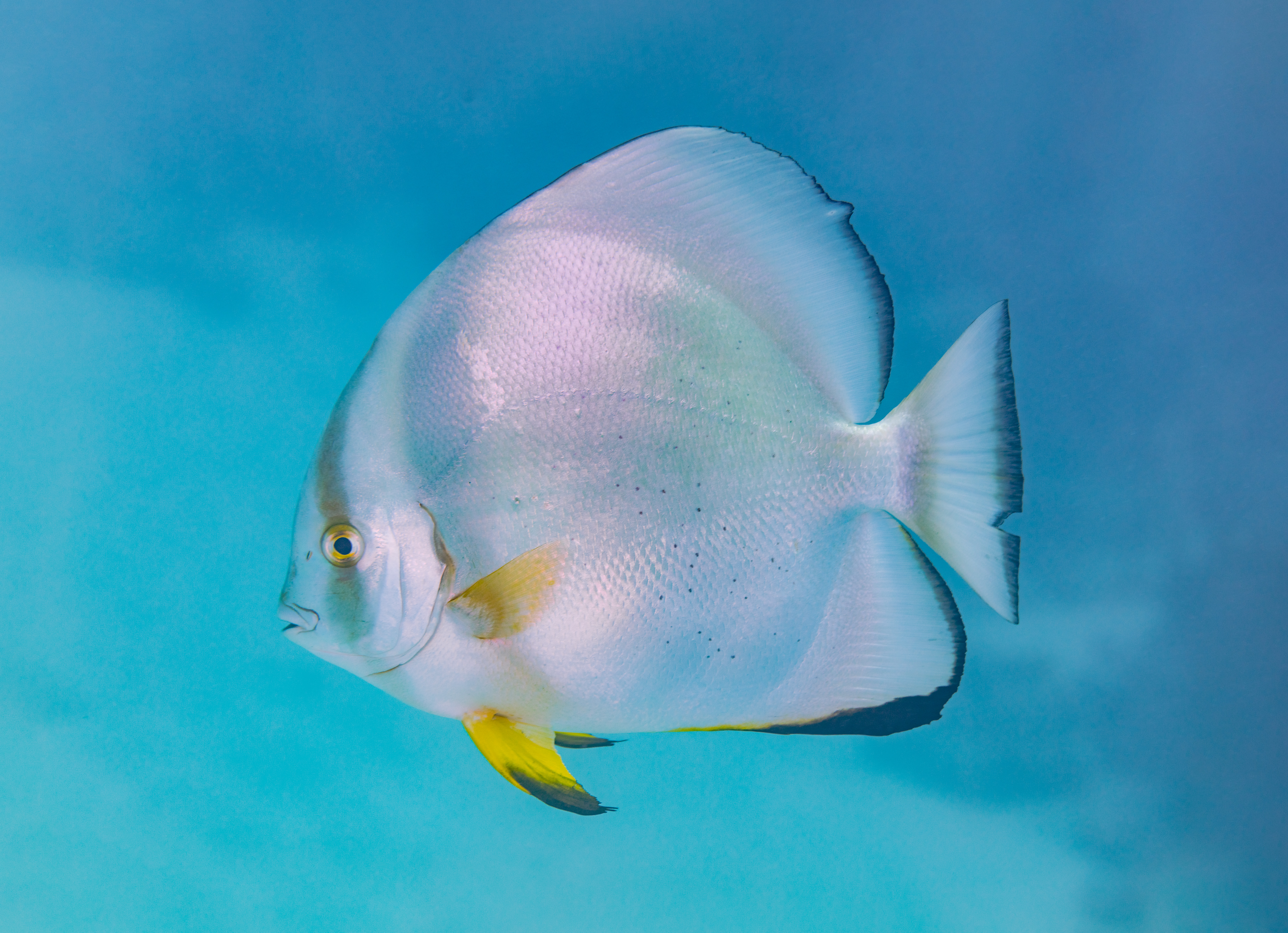

Conservation status
- Least Concern (IUCN 3.1)

Scientific classification
- Kingdom: Animalia
- Phylum: Chordata
- Class: Actinopterygii
- Order: Acanthuriformes
- Family: Ephippidae
- Genus: Platax
- Species: P. orbicularis

Binomial name
- Platax orbicularis (Forsskål, 1775)

Synonyms
- Chaetodon orbicularis Forsskål, 1775; Chaetodon vespertilio Bloch, 1787; Platax vespertilio (Bloch, 1787); Platax ehrenbergii G. Cuvier, 1831; Platax blochii G. Cuvier, 1831; Platax guttulatus G. Cuvier, 1831

= Orbicular batfish =

Species of fish

The orbicular batfish (Platax orbicularis), also known as the cooper batfish, circular batfish, orbiculate batfish, round batfish, narrow-banded batfish or orbic batfish is a species of marine ray-finned fish belonging to the family Ephippidae, the spadefishes and batfishes. This species is found in the Indo-Pacific but has been recorded outside its native range in the western Atlantic Ocean.

== Taxonomy ==
The orbicular batfish was first formally described as Chaetodon orbicularis by the Swedish-speaking Finnish explorer, orientalist, naturalist Peter Forsskål with its type locality given as Jeddah in Saudi Arabia. This species is classified within the genus Platax which belongs to the family Ephippidae in the order Moroniformes. The specific name orbicularis means "circular" or "disc-like", a reference to the round body.

== Description ==
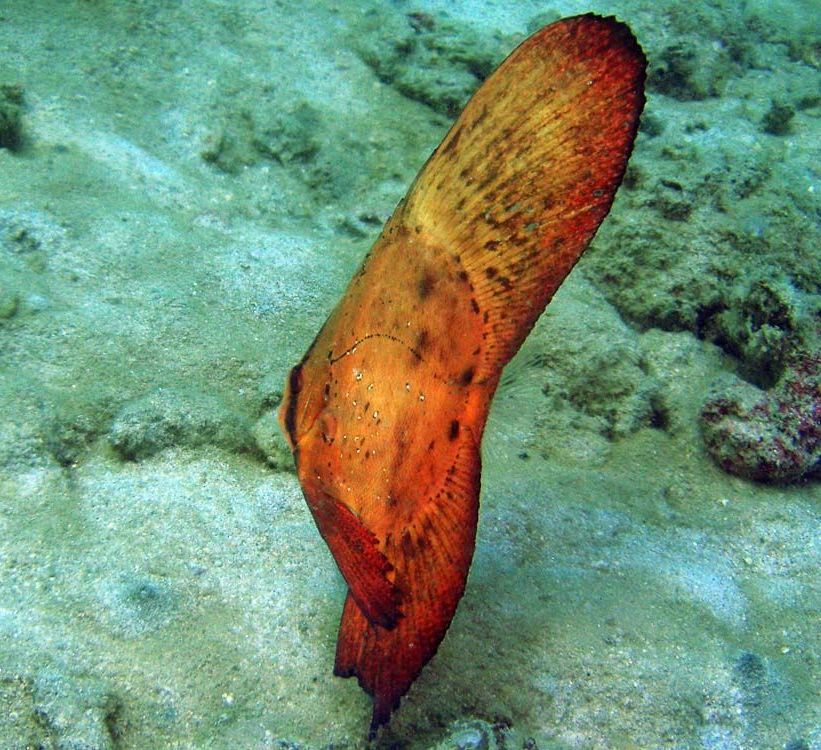
Juvenile

Orbicular batfish adults have orbicular, i.e. round bodies. The body is very deep and is highly compressed. In larger adults, i.e. those with a total length in excess of 40 cm (16 in) have a indented snout with a bony interorbital protuberance. There are five pores on each side of the lower jaw. Both jaws have bands of thin, flattened, tricuspid teeth with the central cusp being around two times as long as the lateral cusps. There are no teeth on the roof of the mouth. The dorsal fin is supported by 5 spines and between 34 and 39 soft rays while the anal fin contains 3 spines and 25 to 29 soft rays. The colour of adults is silvery grey with black vertical bars running through the pectoral fin and eye. The anal and dorsal fins are yellowish with black margins. There is sometimes a scattering of small black spots on the flanks. The small juveniles are reddish brown in colour, marked with irregular black spots and blotches as well as small, white, black margined ocelli on the body. There is a small black spot at base of last 3 rays on both the dorsal and anal fin and the caudal fin is transparent except for its reddish brown base. The orbicular batfish has a maximum published total length of 60 cm (24 in).

== Distribution and habitat ==
Orbicular batfish are native to the Indo-Pacific from eastern Africa from South Africa, Madagascar, the Mascarenes and Seychelles, north into the Red Sea east through the Persian Gulf, and on into Micronesia as far as the Tuamotu Archipelago, north to southern Japan and south to northern Australia. In Australia they are found at the Ashmore Reef in the Timor Sea as well as at Christmas Island and Cocos (Keeling) Islands in the eastern Indian Ocean. On the mainland they occur from Shark Bay in Western Australia around the northern tropical coast and south on the east coast almost to Sydney. They are found in shallow, protected coastal waters including mangroves, coral reefs and deeper areas with silt substrates. The juveniles typically hide among in mangroves and in protected lagoons, frequently amongst flotsam where they mimic dead leaves floating in the water column.

=== Introduced range ===
Orbicular batfish have been recorded in the Western Atlantic off southern Florida, most likely as a result of deliberate release from aquariums.

== Biology ==
Orbicular batfish adults may be found singly, in small schools, or occasionally in large aggregations. Juveniles are either solitary or in small groups. They lay pelagic eggs and females attain sexual maturity at a length of around 32 cm (13 in). They are omnivorous, feeding on algae, small fishes and invertebrates.

== Utilisation ==
The orbicular batfish is mainly caught in subsistence and small scale commercial fisheries using handlines and nets. In French Polynesia, particularly Tahiti, this species is being increasingly used in fish farms to provide food. The juveniles are popular in the aquarium trade with most of the fish in the trade originating in Indonesia and the Philippines.
