= Ninespine batfish =

Scientific classification
- Kingdom: Animalia
- Phylum: Chordata
- Class: Actinopterygii
- Order: Acanthuriformes
- Family: Ephippidae
- Genus: Zabidius; Whitley, 1830
- Species: Z. novemaculeatus

Binomial name
- Zabidius novemaculeatus (McCulloch, 1916)

Synonyms
- Platax novemaculeatus McCulloch, 1916

Species of fish

The ninespine batfish (Zabidius novemaculeatus), or short-finned batfish, is a species of batfish native to coral reefs around Indonesia, Papua New Guinea and Australia at depths of from 10 to 40 metres (33 to 131 ft). This species grows to a length of 45 centimetres (18 in) TL and has been known to reach a weight of 0.8 kilograms (1.8 lb). This species is the only known member of the genus Zabidius.
