= Spawning =

Eggs and sperm released into water

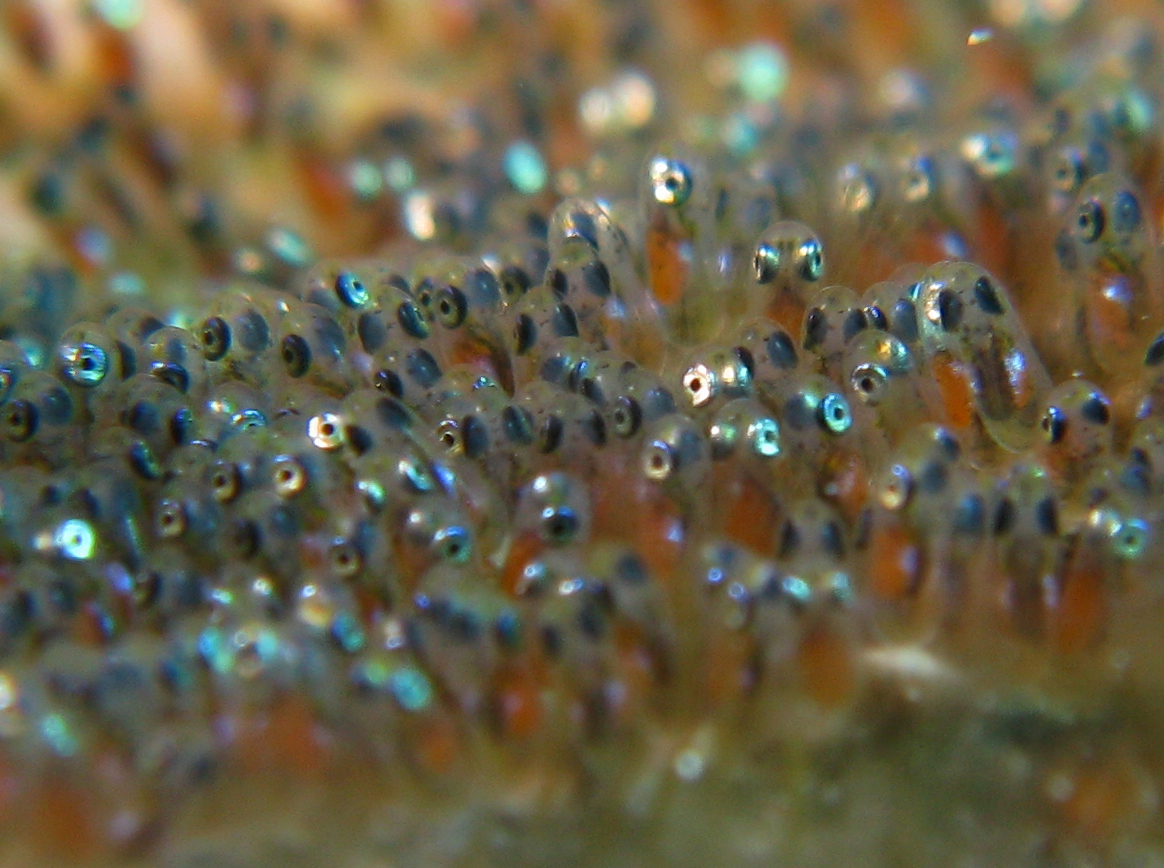
The spawn (eggs) of a clownfish. The black spots are the developing eyes.

Spawn is the eggs and sperm released or deposited into water by aquatic animals. As a verb, to spawn refers to the process of freely releasing eggs and sperm into a body of water (fresh or marine); the physical act is known as spawning. The vast majority of aquatic and amphibious animals reproduce through spawning. These include the following groups:

- Bony fishes
- Crustaceans (such as crabs, shrimps, etc.)
- Molluscs (such as oysters, octopus, squid)
- Echinoderms (such as sea urchins, sea stars, sea cucumbers, etc.)
- Amphibians (such as frogs, toads, salamanders, newts)
- Aquatic insects (such as dragonflies, mayflies, mosquitoes)
- Coral, which are living colonies of tiny, aquatic organisms—not plants, as they are sometimes perceived to be. Corals, while appearing sedentary or botanical by nature, actually spawn by releasing clouds of sperm and egg cells into the water column, where the two mix.

As a general rule, aquatic or semiaquatic reptiles, birds, and mammals do not reproduce through spawning, but rather through copulation like their terrestrial counterparts. This is also true of cartilaginous fishes (such as sharks, rays and skates).

Spawn consists of the reproductive cells (gametes) of many aquatic animals, some of which will become fertilized and produce offspring. The process of spawning typically involves females releasing ova (unfertilized eggs) into the water, often in large quantities, while males simultaneously or sequentially release spermatozoa (milt) to fertilize the eggs.

The fungi (mushrooms), are also said to "spawn" when they release a white, ‘fibrous’ matter, forming the matrix from-which they grow.

There are many variations in the way spawning happens, depending on sexual differences in anatomy, how the sexes relate to each other, where and how the spawn is released and whether or how the spawn is subsequently guarded.

== Overview ==
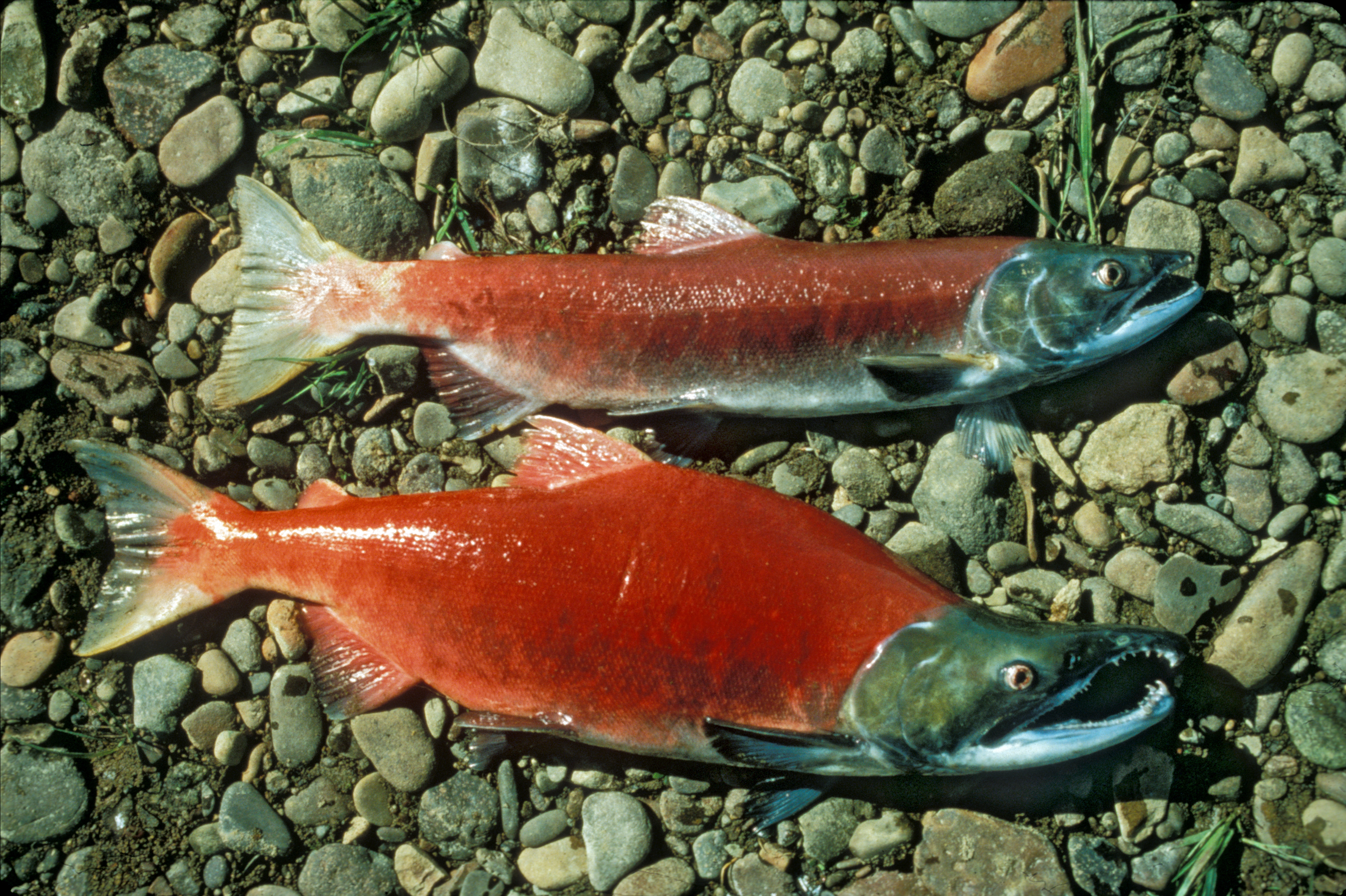
Pacific salmon are semelparous or "big bang" spawners, which means they die shortly after spawning

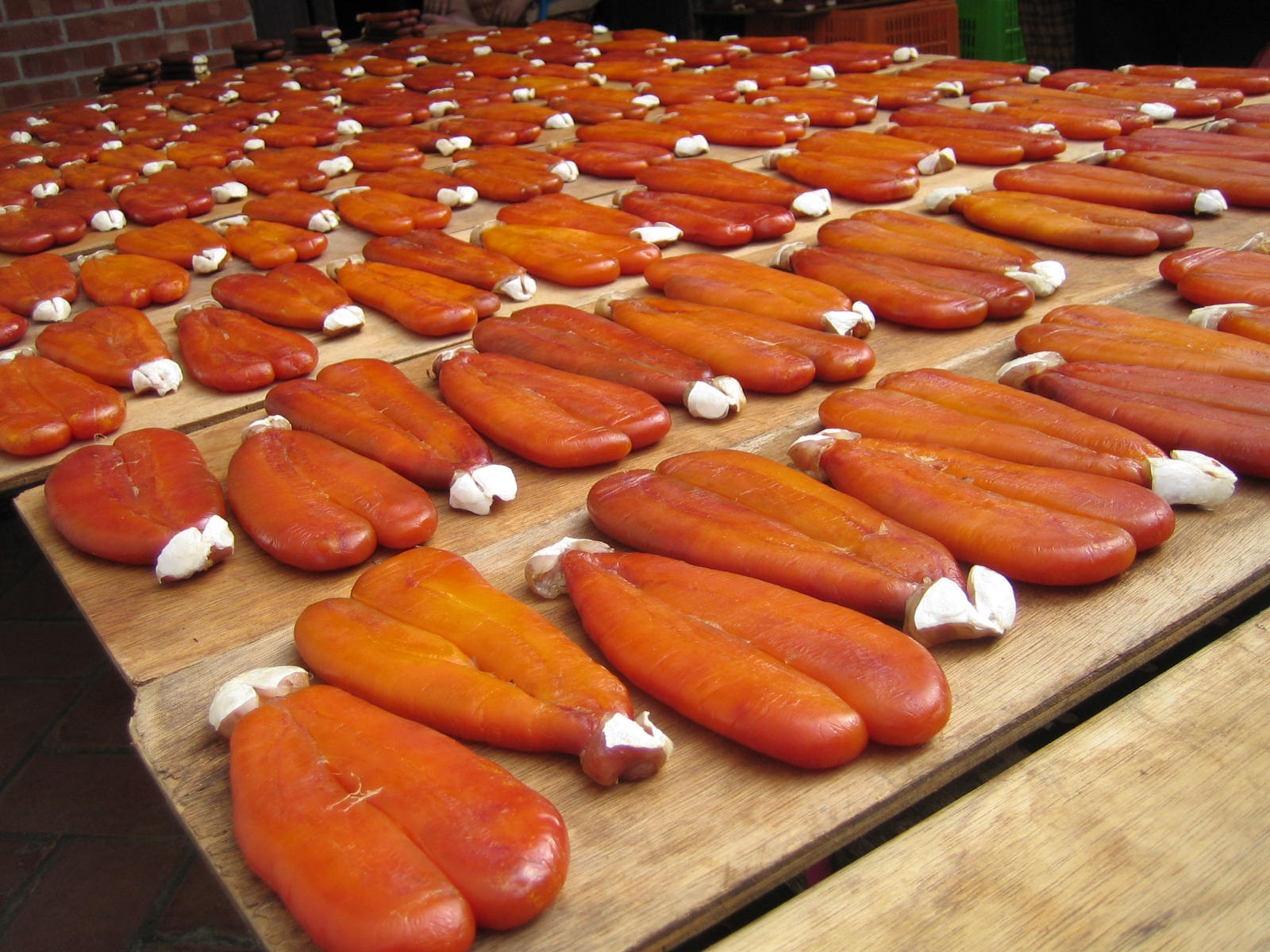
Bottarga, the pickled and dehydrated roe of mullet

Marine animals, and particularly bony fish, commonly reproduce by broadcast spawning. This is an external method of reproduction where the female releases many unfertilised eggs into the water. At the same time, a male or many males release a large amount of sperm into the water which fertilises some of these eggs. The eggs contain a drop of nutrient oil to sustain the embryo as it develops inside the egg case. The oil also provides buoyancy, so the eggs float and drift with the current. The strategy for survival of broadcast spawning is to disperse the fertilised eggs, preferably away from the coast into the relative safety of the open ocean. There the larvae develop as they consume their fat stores, and eventually hatch from the egg capsule into miniature versions of their parents. To survive, they must then become miniature predators themselves, feeding on plankton. Fish eventually encounter others of their own kind (conspecifics), where they form aggregations and learn to school.

Internally, the sexes of most marine animals can be determined by looking at the gonads. For example, male testes of spawning fish are smooth and white and account for up to 12% of the mass of the fish, while female ovaries are granular and orange or yellow, accounting for up to 70% of the fish's mass. Male lampreys, hagfish and salmon discharge their sperm into the body cavity where it is expelled through pores in the abdomen. Male sharks and rays can pass sperm along a duct into a seminal vesicle, where they store it for a while before it is expelled, while teleosts usually employ separate sperm ducts.

Externally, many marine animals, even when spawning, show little sexual dimorphism (difference in body shape or size) or little difference in colouration. Where species are dimorphic, such as sharks or guppies, the males often have penis-like intromittent organs in the form of a modified fin.

A species is semelparous if its individuals spawn only once in their lifetime, and iteroparous if its individuals spawn more than once. The term semelparity comes from the Latin semel, once, and pario, to beget, while iteroparity comes from itero, to repeat, and pario, to beget.

Semelparity is sometimes called "big bang" reproduction, since the single reproductive event of semelparous organisms is usually large and fatal to the spawners. The classic example of a semelparous animal is the Pacific salmon, which lives for many years in the ocean before swimming to the freshwater stream of its birth, spawning, and then dying. Other spawning animals which are semelparous include mayflies, squid, octopus, smelt, capelin and some amphibians. Semelparity is often associated with r-strategists. However, most fish and other spawning animals are iteroparous.

When the internal ovaries or egg masses of fish and certain marine animals are ripe for spawning they are called roe. Roe from certain species, such as shrimp, scallop, crab and sea urchins, are sought as human delicacies in many parts of the world. Caviar is a name for the processed, salted roe of non-fertilized sturgeon. The term soft roe or white roe denotes fish milt. Lobster roe is called coral because it turns bright red when cooked. Roe (reproductive organs) are usually eaten either raw or briefly cooked.

"The reproductive behaviour of fishes is remarkably diversified: they may be oviparous (lay eggs), ovoviviparous (retain the eggs in the body until they hatch), or viviparous (have a direct tissue connection with the developing embryos and give birth to live young). All cartilaginous fishes—the elasmobranchs (e.g., sharks, rays, and skates)—employ internal fertilization and usually lay large, heavy-shelled eggs or give birth to live young. The most characteristic features of the more primitive bony fishes is the assemblage of polyandrous (many males) breeding aggregations in open water and the absence of parental care..."

There are two main reproduction methods in fish. The first method is by laying eggs and the second by live-bearing (producing their young alive).

- In the first method, the female fish lays eggs either on the sea floor or on the leaves of an aquatic plant. A male fish fertilizes the eggs, and both then work together to protect the eggs/babies from danger until they can defend themselves.
- In the second method, the male fish uses its anal fin to transmit sperm into the female fish and fertilize the fish eggs. Later, the female gives live birth to her fry.

== Sexual strategies ==
=== Basic strategies ===
The four basic mating systems
	Single female	Multiple females
Single male	Monogamy	Polygyny
Multiple males	Polyandry	Polygynandry

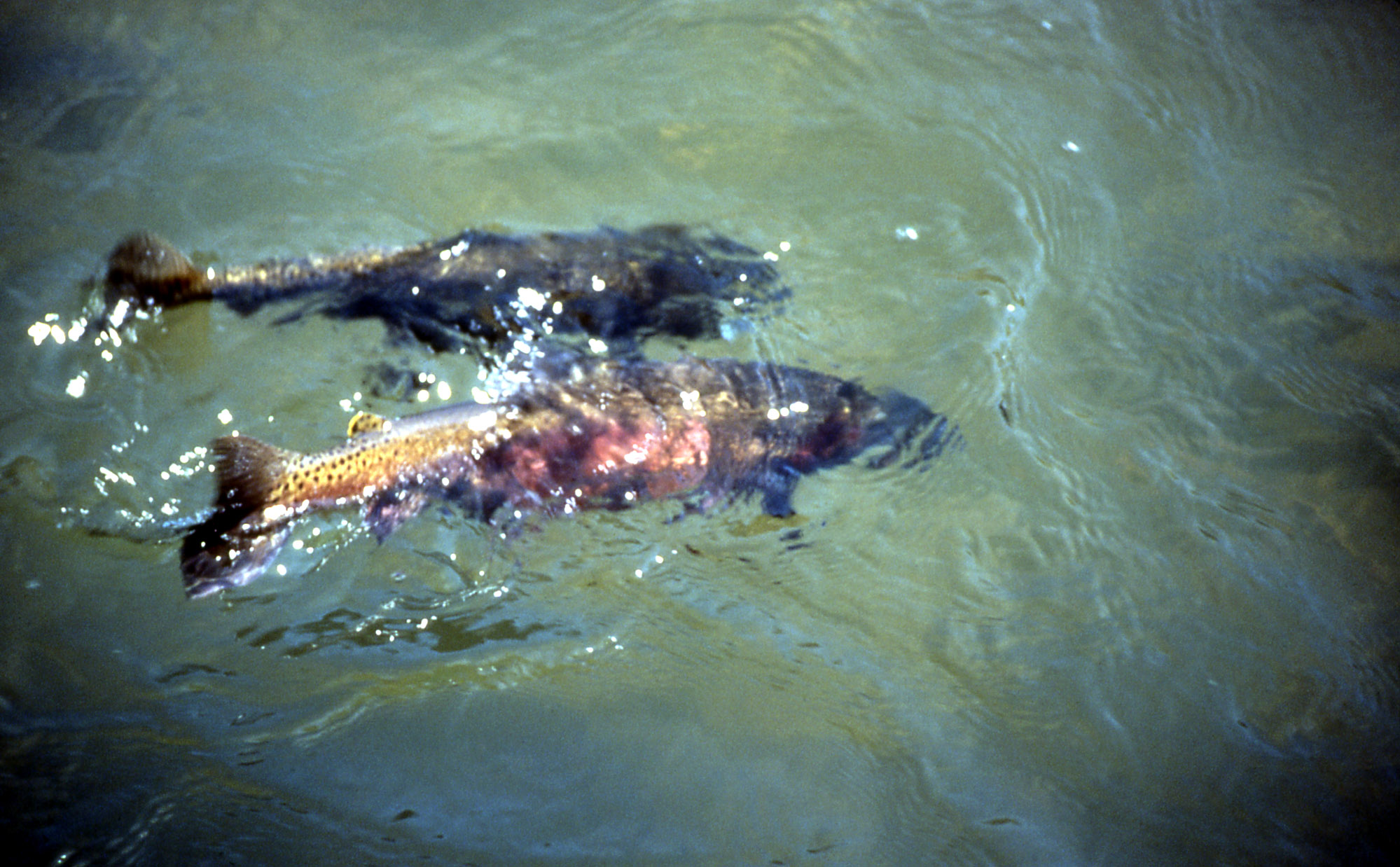
Cutthroat trout are monogamous pair spawners

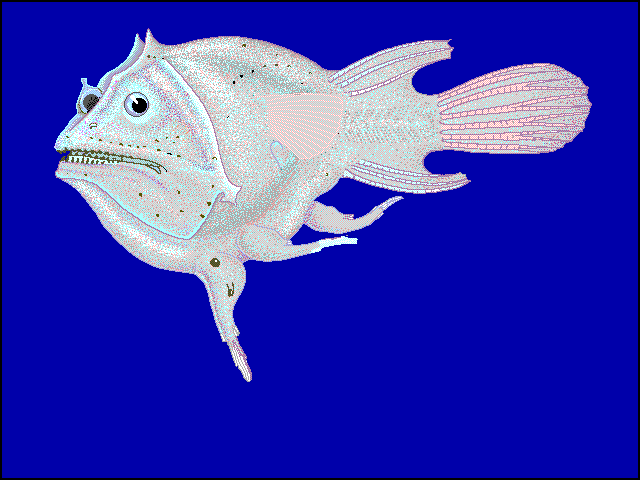
The anglerfish Haplophryne mollis is polyandrous. This female is trailing the atrophied remains of males she has encountered

Monogamy occurs when one male mates with one female exclusively. This is also called pair spawning. Most fish are not monogamous, and when they are, they often alternate with non-monogamous behaviours. Monogamy can occur when feeding and breeding grounds are small, when it is difficult for fish to find partners, or when both sexes look after the young. Many tropical cichlids, which rear their young together in locations where they must fiercely defend against competitors and predators are monogamous. "In some pipefishes and seahorses, development of eggs takes a long time before the female can place them in the brood pouch of a male, where they are fertilized. While the male is pregnant, the female starts a new batch of eggs, which are ready at about the same time that the male gives birth to the young from the previous mating. This close timing of development promotes monogamy, especially if the likelihood of encountering another potential mate is low."

Polygyny occurs when one male gets exclusive mating rights with multiple females. In polygyny, a large conspicuous male usually defends females from other males or defends a breeding site. The females choose large males that are successfully defending prime breeding sites which the females find attractive. For example, sculpin males defend "caves" underneath rocks which are suitable for the incubation of embryos.

Another way males get to mate with several females is through the use of leks. Leks are places where many fish come together, and the males display to each other. Based on these displays, each female then selects the male they want to be their mate. For example, among the cichlid Cyrtocara eucinostomus in Lake Malawi, up to 50,000 large and colourful males display together on a lek four kilometres long. The females, which are mouth brooders, choose which male they want to fertilize their eggs.

Polyandry occurs when one female gets exclusive mating rights with multiple males. This happens among fish like clownfish that change their sex. It can also happen when males do the brooding but cannot handle all the eggs the female produce, such as with some pipefish.

The males in some deep sea anglerfishes are much smaller than the females. When they find a female they bite into her skin, releasing an enzyme that digests the skin of their mouth and her body and fusing the pair down to the blood-vessel level. The male then slowly atrophies, losing first his digestive organs, then his brain, heart, and eyes, ending as nothing more than a pair of gonads, which release sperm in response to hormones in the female's bloodstream indicating egg release. This ensures that, when the female is ready to spawn, she has a mate immediately available. A single anglerfish female can "mate" with many males in this manner.

Polygynandry occurs when multiple males mate indiscriminately with multiple females. This mutual promiscuity is the approach most commonly used by spawning animals, and is perhaps the "original fish mating system." Common examples are forage fish, such as herrings, which form huge mating shoals in shallow water. The water becomes milky with sperm and the bottom is draped with millions of fertilized eggs.

=== Cuckoldry ===
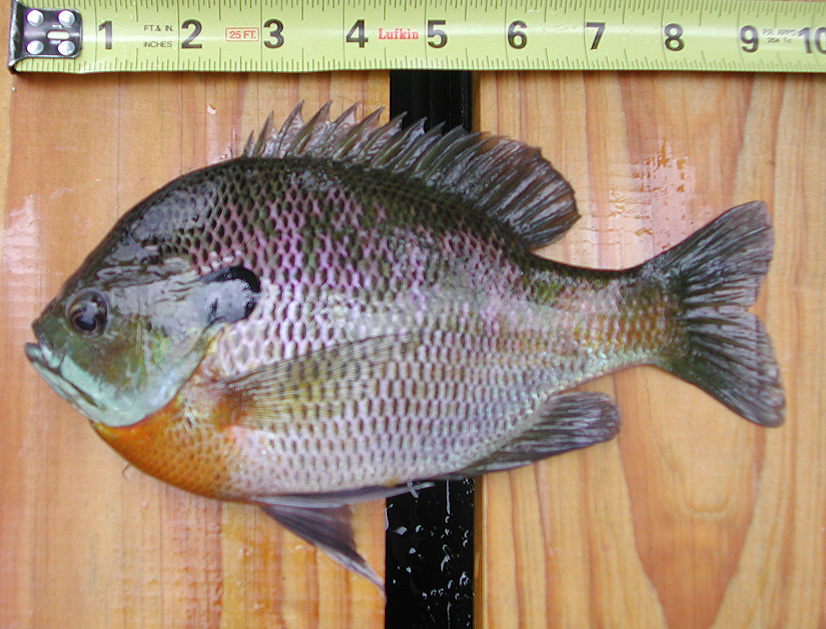
Small male bluegill sunfishes cuckold large males by adopting sneaker or satellite strategies

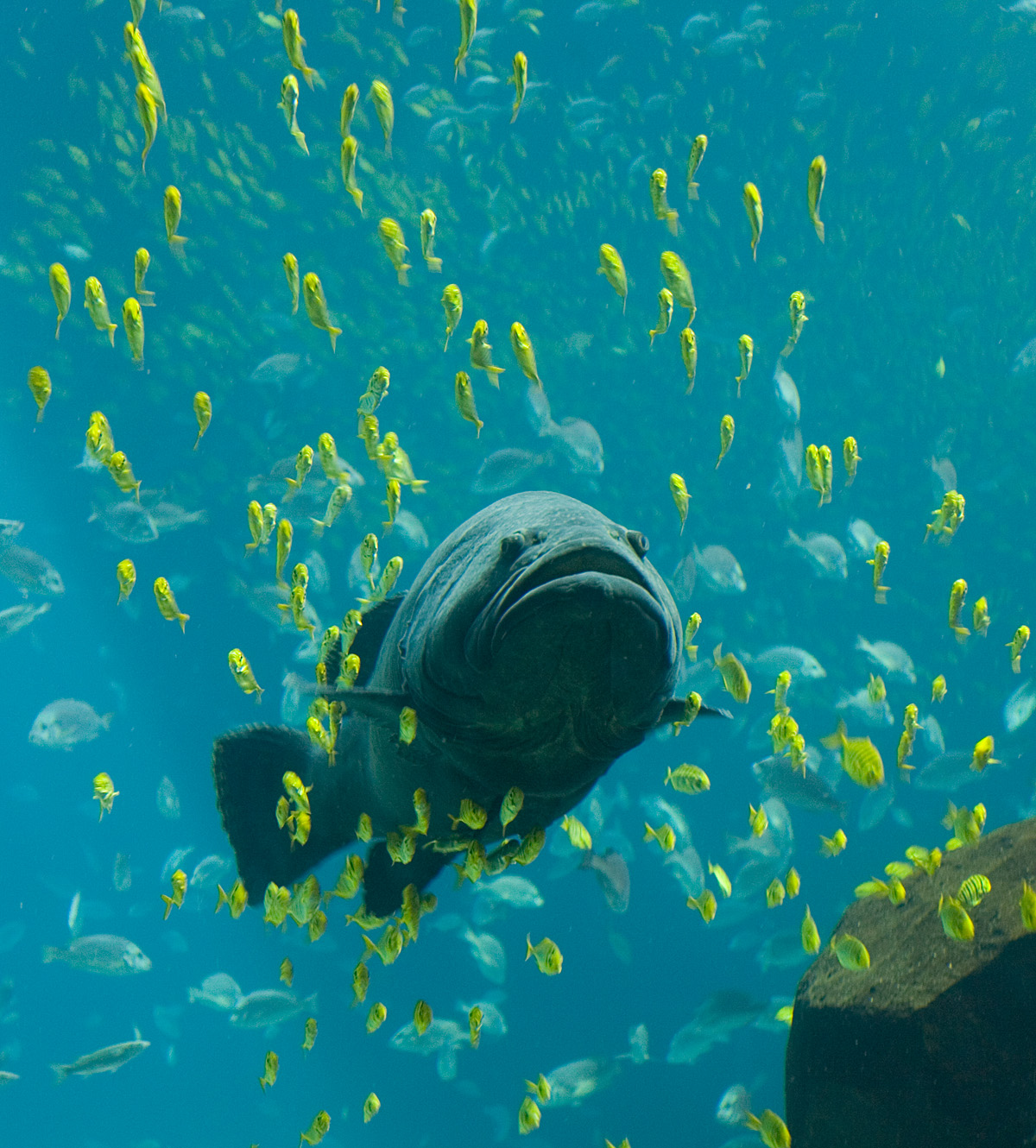
Female groupers change their sex to male if no male is available

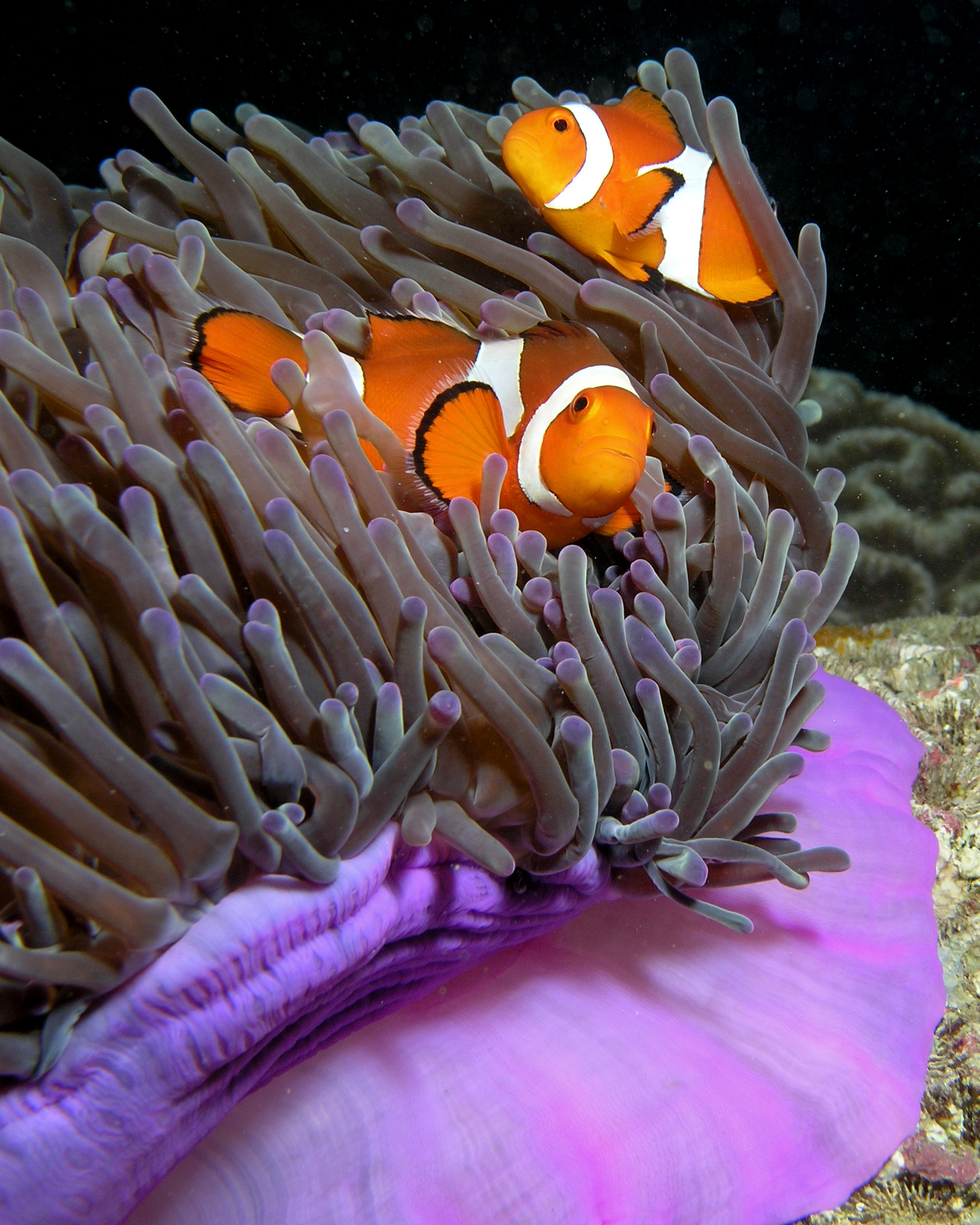
An anemone fish couple guarding their anemone. If the female dies, a juvenile male moves in, and the resident male changes sex.

Alternate male strategies which allow small males to engage in cuckoldry can develop in species where spawning is dominated by large and aggressive males. Cuckoldry is a variant of polyandry, and can occur with sneak spawners (sometimes called streak spawners). A sneak spawner is a male that rushes in to join the spawning rush of a spawning pair. A spawning rush occurs when a fish makes a burst of speed, usually on a near vertical incline, releasing gametes at the apex, followed by a rapid return to the lake or sea floor or fish aggregation. Sneaking males do not take part in courtship. In salmon and trout, for example, jack males are common. These are small silvery males that migrate upstream along with the standard, large, hook-nosed males and that spawn by sneaking into a redd (spawning nest) to release sperm simultaneously with a mated pair. This behaviour is an evolutionarily stable strategy for reproduction, because it is favoured by natural selection just like the "standard" strategy of large males.

Cuckoldry occurs in many fish species, including dragonets, parrotfishes and wrasses on tropical reefs and the bluegill sunfish in fresh water. Sneaker males that become too large to hide effectively become satellite males. With bluegill sunfish, satellite males mimic the behaviour and colouration of the females. They hover over a nest containing a pair of courting sunfish, and gradually descend to reach the pair just as they spawn. Males may need to be 6 or 7 years old to function capably as parental males, but may be able to function as sneaker or satellite males when they are as young as 2 or 3 years old. The smaller satellite and sneaker males may get mauled by the more powerful parental males, but they spawn when they are younger and they do not put energy into parental care.

=== Hermaphroditism ===
Hermaphroditism occurs when a given individual in a species possesses both male and female reproductive organs, or can alternate between possessing first one, and then the other. Hermaphroditism is common in invertebrates but rare in vertebrates. It can be contrasted with gonochorism, where each individual in a species is either male or female, and remains that way throughout their lives. Most fish are gonochorists, but hermaphroditism is known to occur in 14 families of teleost fishes.

Usually hermaphrodites are sequential, meaning they can switch sex, usually from female to male (protogyny). This can happen if a dominant male is removed from a group of females. The largest female in the harem can switch sex over a few days and replace the dominant male. This is found amongst coral reef fishes such as groupers, parrotfishes and wrasses. It is less common for a male to switch to a female (protandry). As an example, most wrasses are protogynous hermaphrodites within a haremic mating system. Hermaphroditism allows for complex mating systems. Wrasses exhibit three different mating systems: polygynous, lek-like, and promiscuous mating systems. Group spawning and pair spawning occur within mating systems. The type of spawning that occurs depends on male body size. Labroids typically exhibit broadcast spawning, releasing high amounts of planktonic eggs, which are broadcast by tidal currents; adult wrasses have no interaction with offspring. Wrasse of a particular subgroup of the family Labridae, Labrini, do not exhibit broadcast spawning.

Less commonly hermaphrodites can be synchronous, meaning they simultaneously possess both ovaries and testicles and can function as either sex at any one time. Black hamlets "take turns releasing sperm and eggs during spawning. Because such egg trading is advantageous to both individuals, hamlets are typically monogamous for short periods of time–an unusual situation in fishes." The sex of many fishes is not fixed, but can change with physical and social changes to the environment where the fish lives.

Particularly among fishes, hermaphroditism can pay off in situations where one sex is more likely to survive and reproduce, perhaps because it is larger. Anemone fishes are sequential hermaphrodites which are born as males, and become females only when they are mature. Anemone fishes live together monogamously in an anemone, protected by the anemone stings. The males do not have to compete with other males, and female anemone fish are typically larger. When a female dies a juvenile (male) anemone fish moves in, and "the resident male then turns into a female and reproductive advantages of the large female–small male combination continue". In other fishes sex changes are reversible. For example, if some gobies are grouped by sex (male or female), some will switch sex.

=== Unisexuality ===
Unisexuality occurs when a species is all-male or all-female. Unisexuality occurs in some fish species, and can take complex forms. Squalius alburnoides, a minnow found in several river basins in Portugal and Spain, appears to be an all-male species. The existence of this species illustrates the potential complexity of mating systems in fish. The species originated as a hybrid between two species, and is diploid, but not hermaphroditic. It can have triploid and tetraploid forms, including all-female forms that reproduce mainly through hybridogenesis.

It is rare to find true parthenogenesis in fishes, where females produce female offspring with no input from males. All-female species include the Texas silverside, Menidia clarkhubbsi as well as the Amazon molly. Parthenogenesis has been recently observed in hammerhead sharks and blacktip sharks. It is also known to occur in crayfish and amphibians.

== Spawning strategies ==
This section is patterned after a classification of the spawning behaviours of fish by Balon (1975, 1984) into reproductive guilds. This classification is based on how the eggs are fertilized (internal or external spawners), where the eggs are deposited (pelagic or benthic spawners), and whether and how the parents look after the eggs after spawning (bearers, guarders and nonguarders).

=== Nonguarders ===
Nonguarders do not protect their eggs and offspring after spawning

==== Open substrate spawners ====
Nonguarders: Open substrate spawners
- Pelagic spawners
- Benthic spawners
  - Spawners on coarse bottoms
    - Pelagic free embryo and larvae
    - Benthic free embryo and larvae
  - Spawners on plants
    - Obligatory
    - Nonobligatory
  - Spawners on fine substrates
- Terrestrial spawners

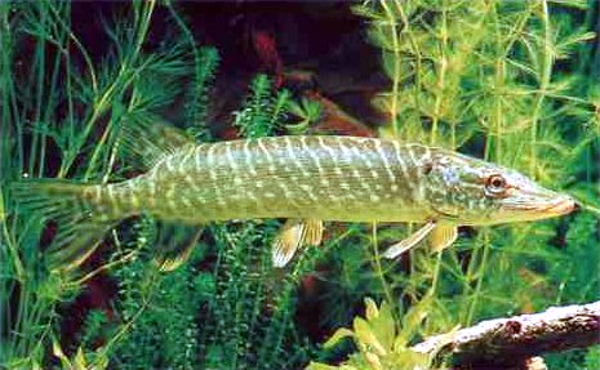
Pike usually spawn on vegetation flooded by high water. Their eggs adhere to the stems of plants.

Nonguarders: Brood hiders
- Benthic spawners
- Crevice spawners
- Spawners on invertebrates
- Beach spawners

Bitterlings transfer responsibility for the care of their young to mussels. This male bitterling is exhibiting spawning colours

Open substrate spawners scatter their eggs in the environment. They usually spawn in shoals without complex courtship rituals, and males outnumber females.

Broadcast spawners: release their gametes (sperm and eggs) into open water for external fertilisation. There is no subsequent parental care. About 75% of coral species are broadcasters, the majority of which are hermatypic, or reef-building corals.

- Pelagic spawners: a type of broadcast spawners, spawn in the open sea, mostly near the surface. They are usually pelagic fish such as tuna and sardines. Some demersal fish leave the bottom to spawn pelagically, particularly coral reef fish such as parrotfish and wrasses. Pelagic spawning means water currents widely disperse the young. The eggs, embryos and larvae of pelagic spawners contain oil globules or have a high water content. As a result, they are buoyant and are widely dispersed by currents. The downside is that mortality is high, because they can be eaten so easily by pelagic predators or they can drift into unsuitable areas. Females compensate by spawning large numbers of eggs and extending their spawning periods. Pelagic spawners that live in or around coral reefs can spawn a small number of eggs almost daily over a period of months. These fishes have complex breeding behaviours including sex changes, harems, leks and territoriality.
- Benthic spawners: deposit their spawn on or near the bottom of the sea (or lake). They are usually demersal fish such as cod and flatfish. These species typically spawn without ceremony; they do not engage in elaborate courtship rituals. Each female is usually followed by several males who fertilize the eggs as they are released. Various strategies ensure the eggs and embryos remain in place, and do not drift with the current. The eggs can adhere to other eggs or to whatever they are deposited on, or the eggs can be laid in long strings which are wrapped around plants or rocks. Some eggs take on water after they are released, so they can be dropped into cracks where they swell and wedge themselves in place.
  - Egg scatterers: scatter adhesive or non-adhesive eggs to fall to the substrate, into plants, or float to the surface. These species do not look after their brood and even eat their own eggs. These are often schooling fish which spawn in groups or pairs, often laying a large number of small eggs. The fry hatch quickly.
  - Egg depositors: deposit eggs on a substrate (tank glass, wood, rocks, plants). Egg depositors usually lay fewer eggs than egg-scatterers, although the eggs are larger. Egg depositors fall into two groups: those that care for their eggs, and those that do not. Among egg depositors that care for their eggs are cichlids and some catfish. Egg depositors that care for their young can be divided into two groups: cavity spawners and open spawners.
  - Cavity spawners: lay eggs in a cave or cavity. These fish form pairs and have advanced brood care where the eggs are defended and cleaned. The eggs take a few days to hatch, and the fry are often guarded by the parents. Various catfish, Cyprinidae, and killifish make up the majority. Cavity spawners can be contrasted with open (shelter) spawners, which lay their eggs on an open surface.

==== Brood hiders ====
Brood hiders hide their eggs but do not give parental care after they have hidden them. Brood hiders are mostly benthic spawners that bury the fertilized eggs. For example, among salmon and trout the female digs a nest with her tail in gravel. These nests are called redds. The female then lays her eggs while the male fertilizes them, while both fish defend the redd if necessary from other members of the same species. Then the female buries the nest, and the nest site is abandoned. In North America, some minnows build nests out of piles of stones rather than dig holes. The minnow males have tubercles on their head and body which they use to help them defend the nest site.

- Egg buriers - can inhabit waters that dry up at some time of the year. An example are annual killifish which lay their eggs in mud. The parents mature quickly and lay their eggs before dying when the water dries up. The eggs remain in a dormant stage until rains stimulate hatching.

Bitterlings have a remarkable reproduction strategy where parents transfer responsibility for the care of their young to mussels. The female extends her ovipositor into the mantle cavity of the mussel and deposits her eggs between the gill filaments. The male then ejects his sperm into the mussel's inhalant water current and fertilization takes place within the gills of the host. The same female may use a number of mussels, and she deposits only one or two yellow, oval eggs into each. Early developmental stages are protected from predation within the body of the mussel. After 3 to 4 weeks larvae swim away from the host to continue life on their own.

=== Guarders ===
Guarders: Substrate spawners
- Rock tenders
- Plant tenders
- Terrestrial tenders
- Pelagic tenders

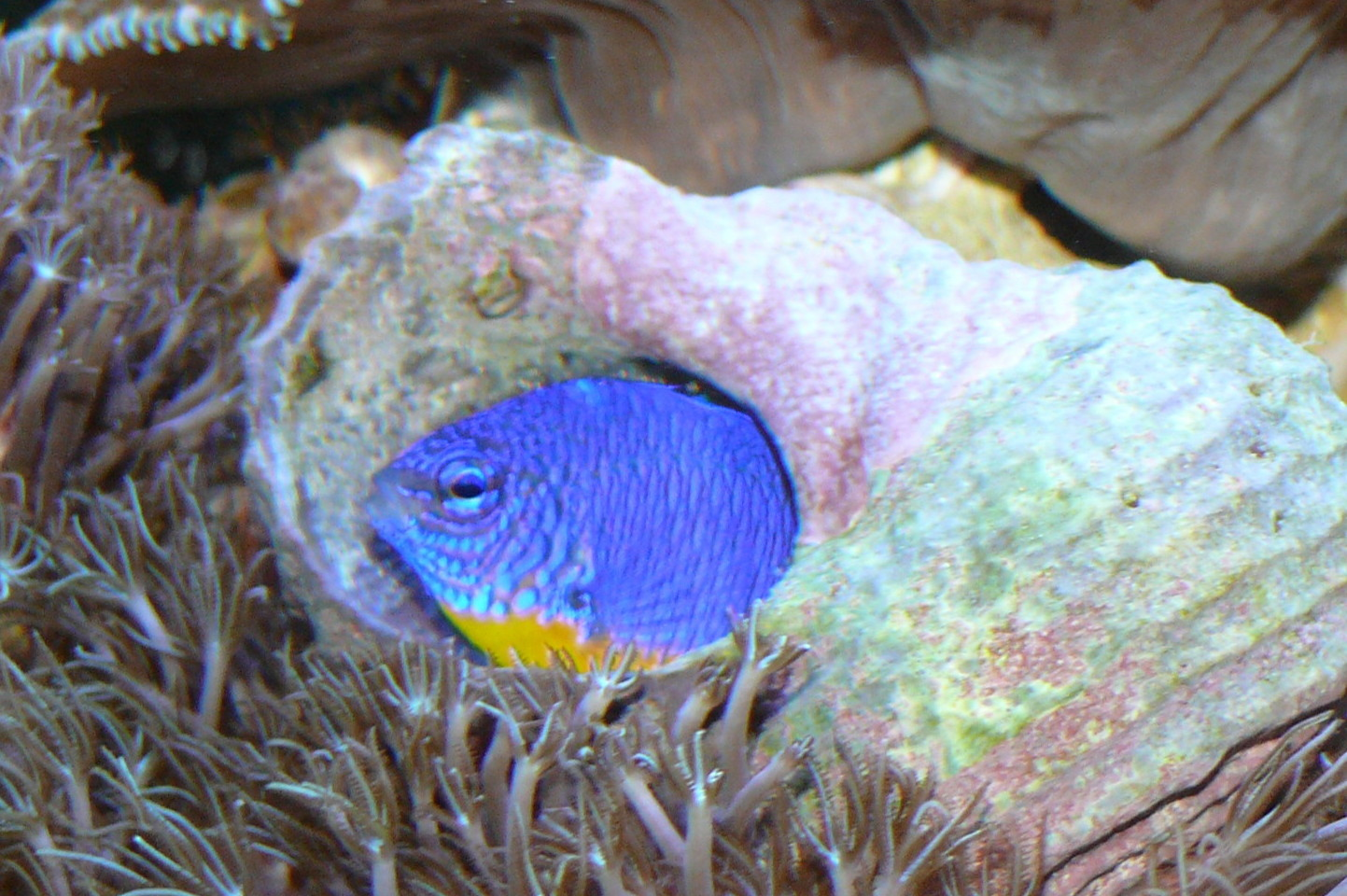
Damselfish are substrate spawners. This one keeps her spawn in a gastropod shell

Guarders: Nest spawners
- Rock and gravel nesters
- Sand nesters
- Plant-material nesters
  - Gluemakers
  - Nongluemakers
- Bubble nesters
- Hole nesters
- Misc-materials nesters
- Anemone nesters

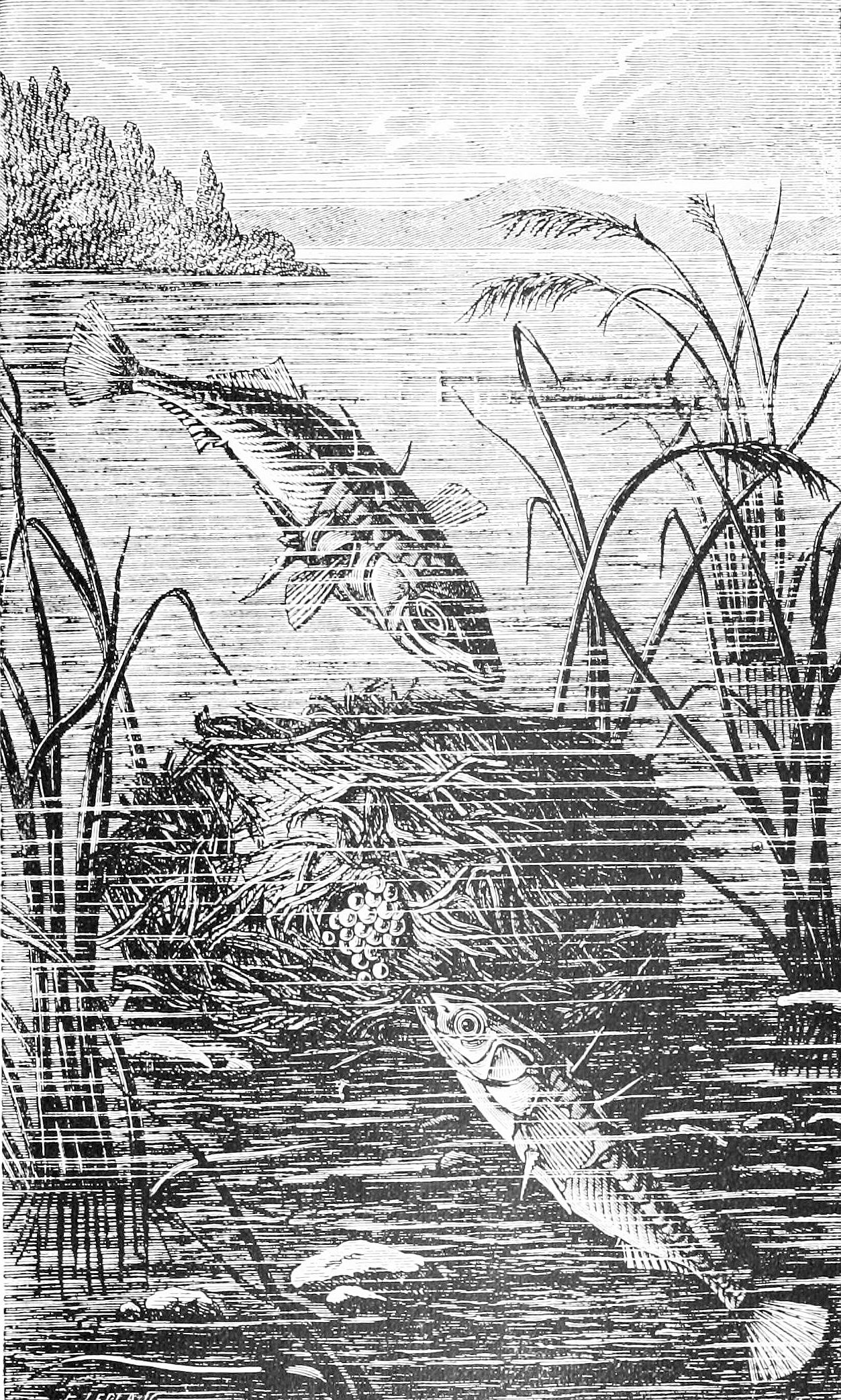
The stickleback glues plant material to make its nest

Guarders protect their eggs and offspring after spawning by practicing parental care (also called brood care). Parental care is an "investment by parents in offspring that increases the offspring's chances of surviving (and hence reproducing). In fish, parental care can take a variety of forms including guarding, nest building, fanning, splashing, removal of dead eggs, retrieval of straying fry, external egg carrying, egg burying, moving eggs or young, ectodermal feeding, oral brooding, internal gestation, brood-pouch egg carrying, etc."

Territorial behaviour is generally necessary for guarders, and the embryos are almost always guarded by males (apart from cichlids). There is a need to be territorial because looking after embryos usually includes defending the site where they are being looked after. It also often means there is competition for the best egg-laying sites. Elaborate courtship behaviour is usual among guarders.

Guarding males keep the embryos safe from predators, keep oxygen levels high by fanning water currents, and keep the area free from dead embryos and debris. They protect the embryos until they hatch, and often look after the larval stages as well. The time spent guarding can range from a few days to several months.

==== Substrate spawners ====
Some guarders build nests (nest spawners) and some do not (substrate spawners), though the difference between the two groups can be small. Substrate spawners clean off a suitable area of surface suitable for egg laying, and look after the area, but they do not actively build a nest.

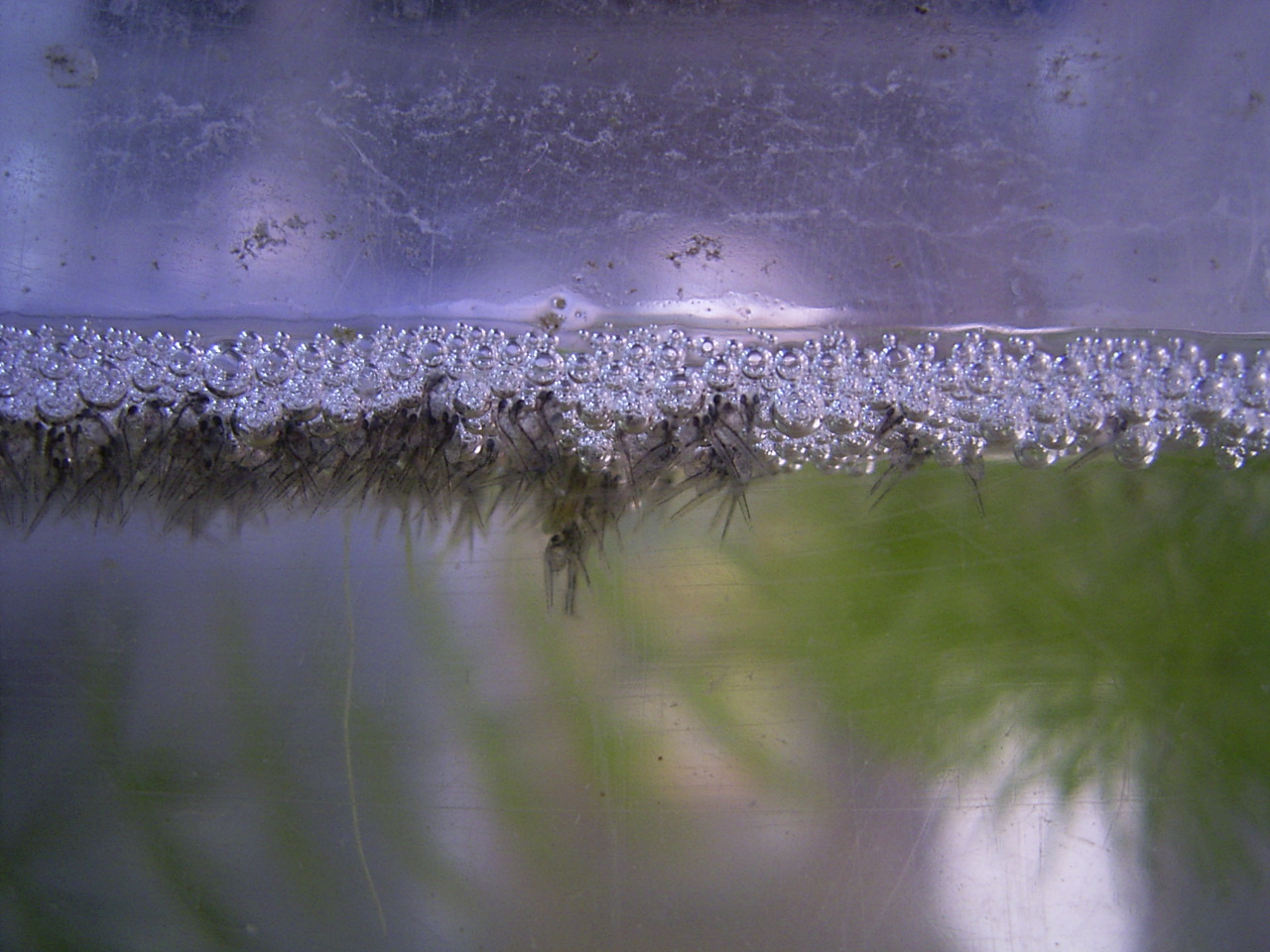
Baby paradise fish just hatched, gathered under the surface of a bubble nest

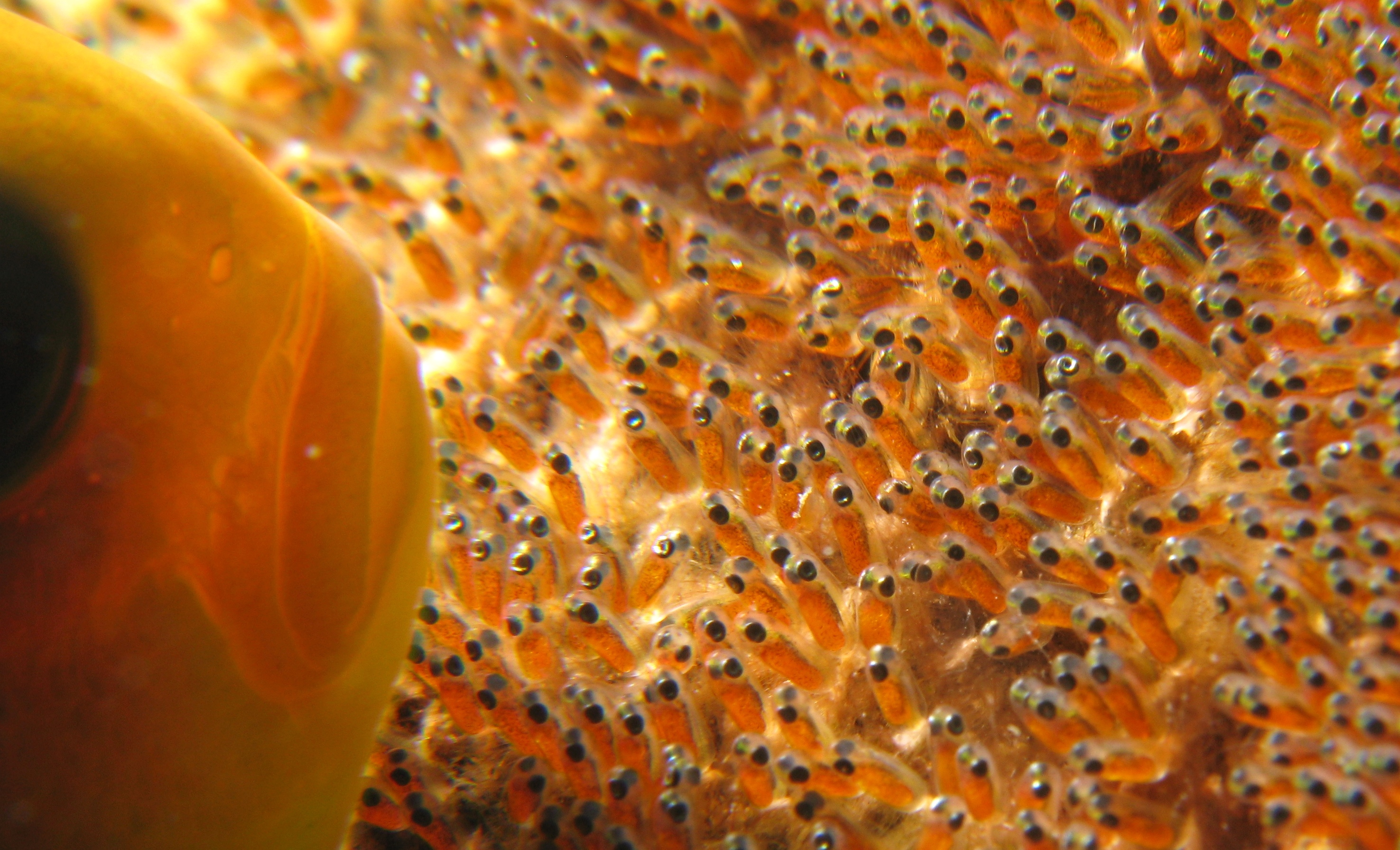
Anemone fish nest in a sea anemone. Here a male is protecting spawn produced by his partner.

=== Bearers ===
Bearers: External
- Transfer brooders
- Auxiliary brooders
- Mouth brooders
- Gill-chamber brooders
- Pouch brooders

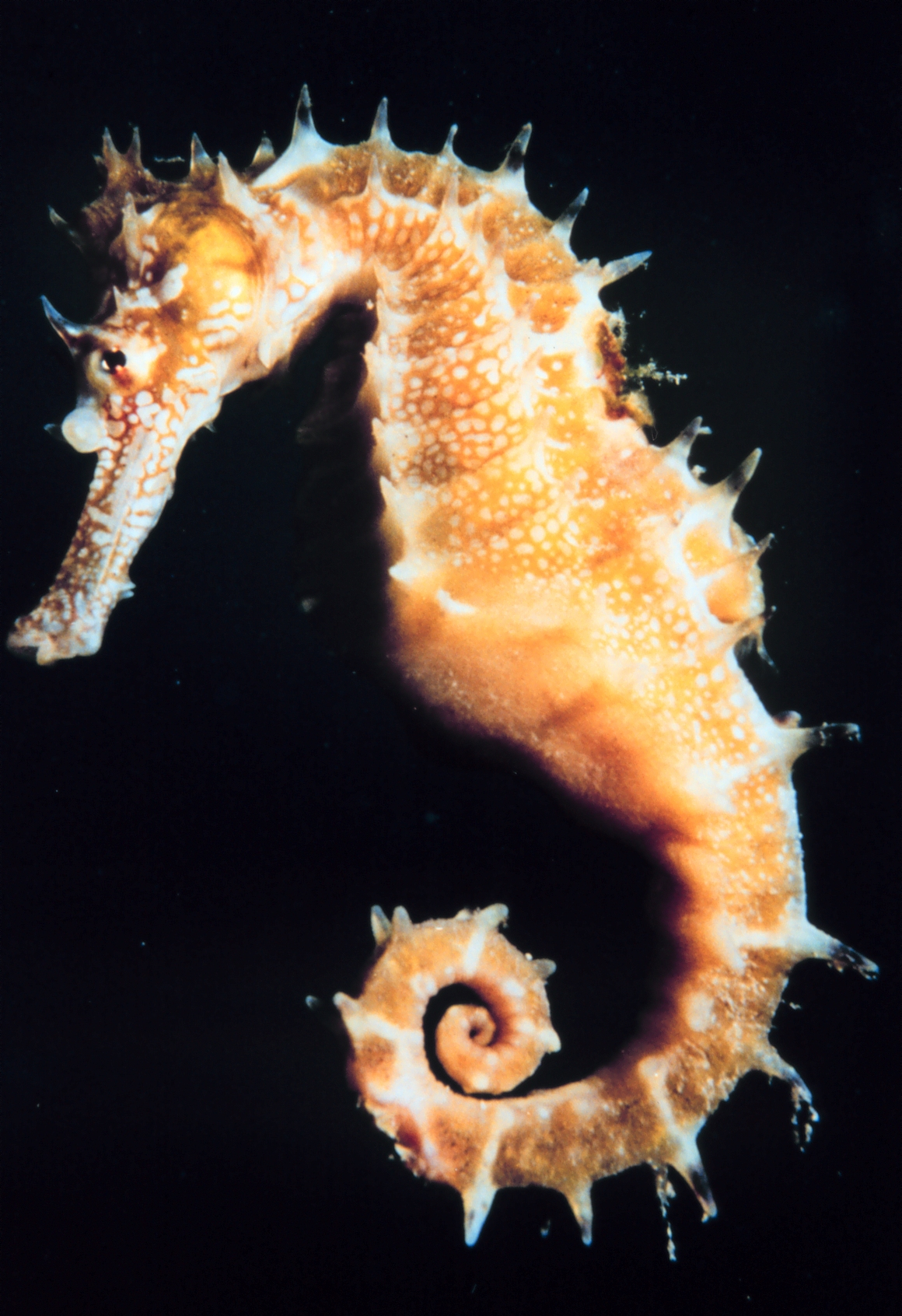
Male seahorses are pouch brooders

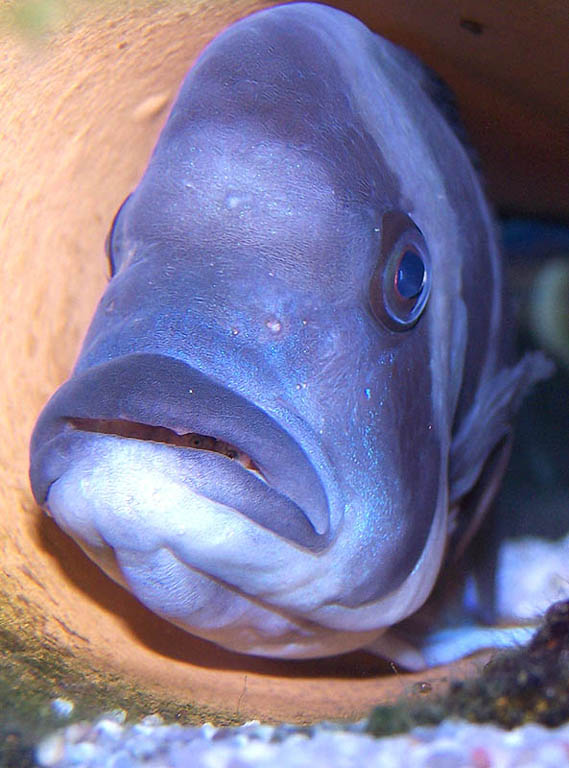
A female cichlid mouthbrooding fry which can be seen looking out her mouth External videos: Mouthbrooding tilapia — YouTube; Mouthbrooding cichlid — YouTube

Bearers are fish that carry their embryos (and sometimes their young) around with them, either externally or internally.

==== External bearers ====
Mouth brooders - carry eggs or larvae in their mouth. Mouth brooders can be ovophiles or larvophiles. Ovophile or egg-loving mouth-brooders lay their eggs in a pit, which are sucked up into the mouth of the female. The small number of large eggs hatch in the mother's mouth, and the fry remain there for a period of time. Fertilization often occurs with the help of egg-spots, which are colorful spots on the anal fin of the male. When the female sees these spots, she tries to pick up the egg-spots, but instead gets sperm that fertilizes the eggs in her mouth. Many cichlids and some labyrinth fish are ovophile mouthbrooders. Larvophile or larvae-loving mouth-brooders lay their eggs on a substrate and guard them until the eggs hatch. After hatching, the female picks up the fry and keeps them in her mouth. When the fry can fend for themselves, they are released. Some eartheaters are larvophile mouthbrooders.

==== Internal bearers ====
===== Facultative internal bearers =====
The beginning of the evolutionary process of livebearing starts with facultative (optional) internal bearing. The process occurs in several species of oviparous (egg-laying) killifishes which spawn in the normal way on the substrate, but in the process accidentally fertilize eggs that the female retains and does not spawn. These eggs are spawned later, usually without allowing much time for embryonic development.

Bearers: Internal
- Facultative internal bearers
- Obligate internal bearers
- Livebearers

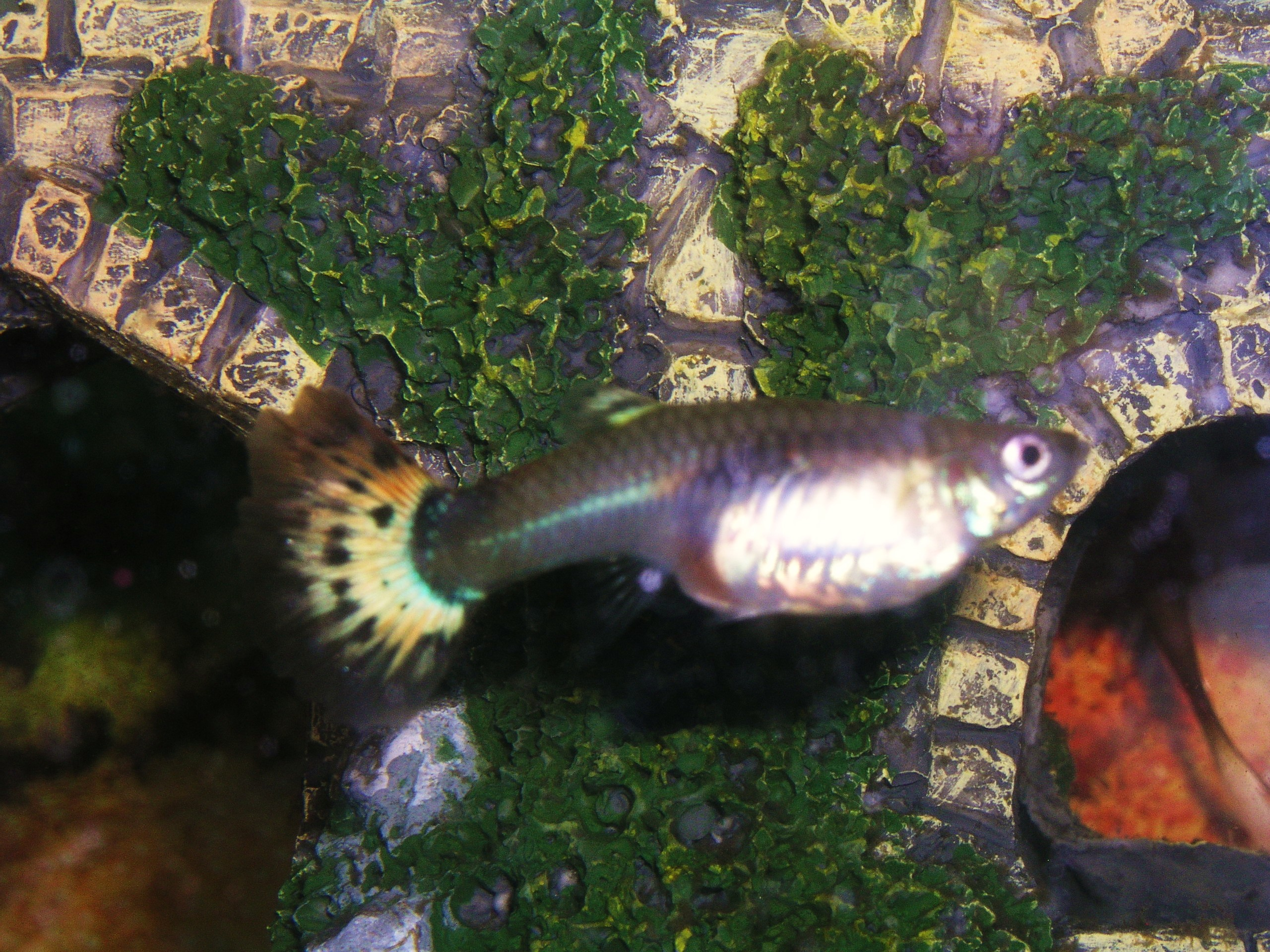
Guppies are livebearers. This one has been pregnant for about 26 days.

===== Obligate internal bearers =====
The next step in the evolution of livebearing is obligate (by necessity) internal bearing, where the female retains all the embryos. "The only source of nutrition for these embryos, however, is the egg yolk, as in externally spawned eggs. This situation, also referred to as ovoviviparity, is characteristic of marine rock fishes and the Lake Baikal sculpins. This strategy allows these fish to have fecundities approaching those of pelagic fish with external fertilization, but it also enables them to protect the young during their most vulnerable stage of development. By contrast, sharks and rays using this strategy produce a relatively small number of embryos and retain them for a few weeks to 16 months or longer. The shorter times spans are characteristic of species that eventually deposit their embryos in the environment, surrounded by a horny capsule; whereas the longer periods are characteristic of sharks that retain the embryos until they are ready to emerge as actively swimming young."

===== Viviparous fish =====
However, some fish do not fit these categories. The livebearing largespring gambusia (Gambusia geiseri) was thought to be ovoviviparous until it was shown in 2001 that the embryos received nutrients from the mother.

== Spawning grounds ==
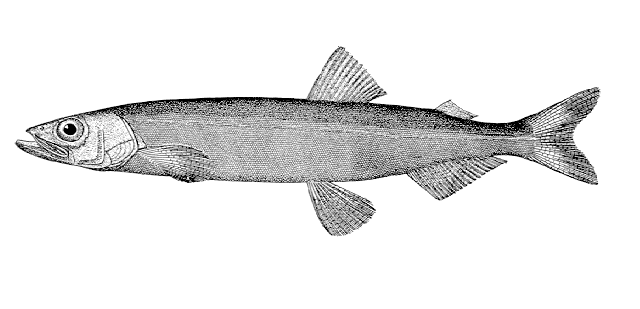
Capelin migrate huge distances to their spawning grounds

Migration of capelin around Iceland. Capelin on the way to feeding grounds is green, capelin on the way back is blue, the breeding grounds are red.

Spawning grounds are the areas of water where aquatic animals spawn, or produce their eggs. After spawning, the spawn may or may not drift to new grounds which become their nursery grounds. Many species undertake migrations each year, and sometimes great migrations, to reach their spawning grounds. For example, lakes and river watersheds can be major spawning grounds for anadromous fish such as salmon. These days, it is often necessary to construct fish ladders and other bypass systems so salmon can navigate their way past hydroelectric dams or other obstructions such as weirs on their way to spawning grounds. Coastal fish often use mangroves and estuaries as spawning grounds, while reef fish can find adjacent seagrass meadows that make good spawning grounds. Short-finned eels can travel anything up to three or four thousand kilometres to their spawning ground in deep water somewhere in the Coral Sea.

Forage fish often make great migrations between their spawning, feeding and nursery grounds. Schools of a particular stock usually travel in a triangle between these grounds. For example, one stock of herrings have their spawning ground in southern Norway, their feeding ground in Iceland, and their nursery ground in northern Norway. Wide triangular journeys such as these may be important because forage fish, when feeding, cannot distinguish their own offspring.

Capelin are a forage fish of the smelt family found in the Atlantic and Arctic oceans. In summer, they graze on dense swarms of plankton at the edge of the ice shelf. Larger capelin also eat krill and other crustaceans. The capelin move inshore in large schools to spawn and migrate in spring and summer to feed in plankton rich areas between Iceland, Greenland, and Jan Mayen. The migration is affected by ocean currents. Around Iceland maturing capelin make large northward feeding migrations in spring and summer. The return migration takes place in September to November. The spawning migration starts north of Iceland in December or January.

The diagram on the right shows the main spawning grounds and larval drift routes. Capelin on the way to feeding grounds is coloured green, capelin on the way back is blue, and the breeding grounds are red. In a paper published in 2009, researchers from Iceland recount their application of an interacting particle model to the capelin stock around Iceland, successfully predicting the spawning migration route for 2008.

Referred to as "the greatest shoal on earth", the sardine run occurs when millions of sardines migrate from their spawning grounds south of the southern tip of Africa northward along the Eastern Cape coastline. Chinook salmon make the longest freshwater migration of any salmon, over 3,000 kilometres (1,900 mi) up the Yukon River to spawning grounds upstream of Whitehorse, Yukon. Some green sea turtles swim more than 2,600 kilometres (1,600 mi) to reach their spawning grounds.

== Examples ==
=== Fish ===
Female goldfish spawn (discharge) eggs into the water, encouraged by male goldfish who simultaneously discharge sperm which externally fertilizes the eggs

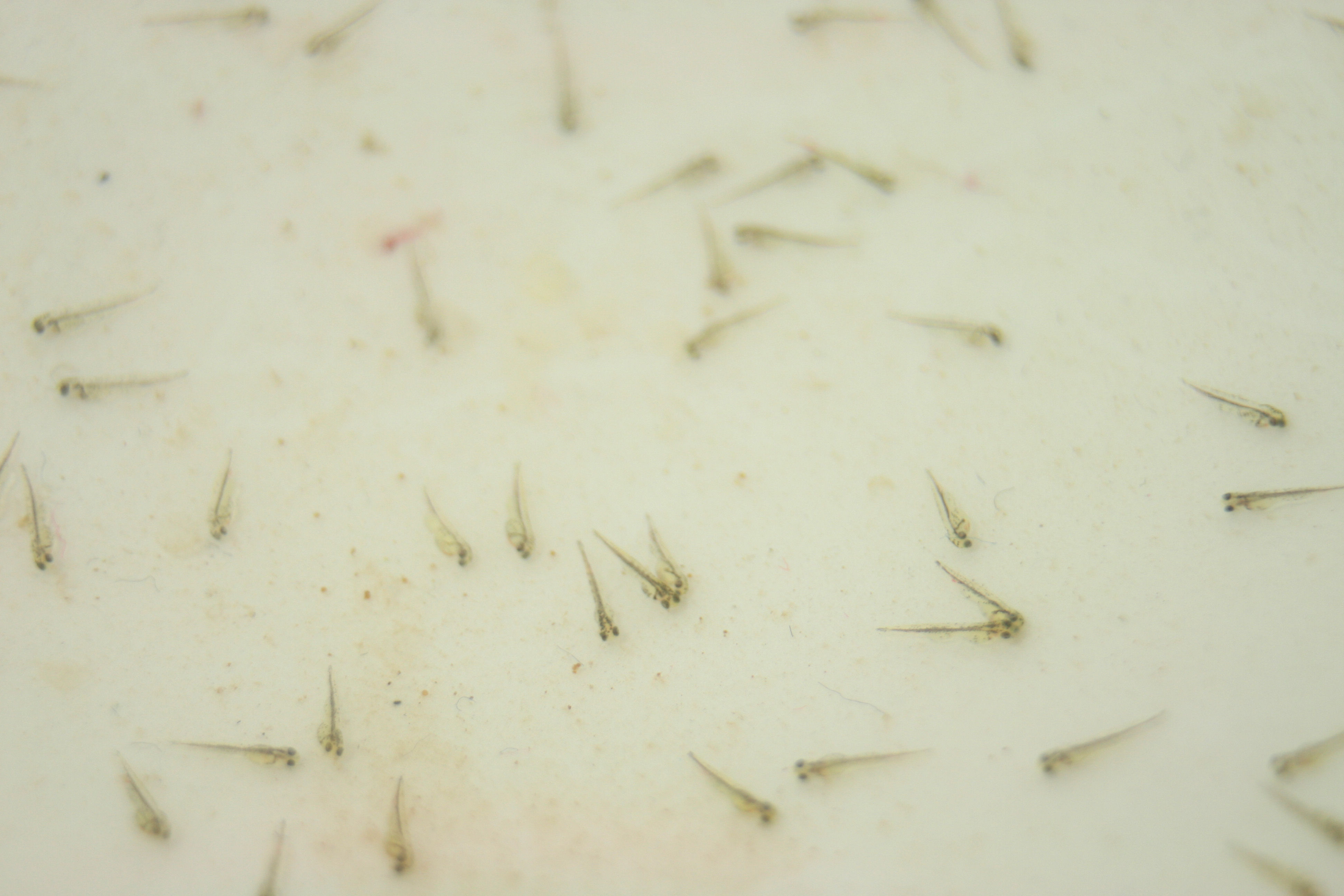
Within two or three days, the vulnerable goldfish eggs hatch into larvae, and rapidly develop into fry

==== Goldfish ====
Goldfish, like all cyprinids, are egg-layers. They usually start breeding after a significant temperature change, often in spring. Males chase females, prompting them to release their eggs by bumping and nudging them. As the female goldfish spawns her eggs, the male goldfish stays close behind fertilizing them. Their eggs are adhesive and attach to aquatic vegetation. The eggs hatch within 48 to 72 hours. Within a week or so, the fry begins to assume its final shape, although a year may pass before they develop a mature goldfish colour; until then they are a metallic brown like their wild ancestors. In their first weeks of life, the fry grow quickly—an adaptation born of the high risk of getting devoured by the adult goldfish.

==== Carp ====
Carp typically spawn in the spring and summer, depending on the climate and conditions. Oxygen levels of the water, availability of food, size of each fish, age, number of times the fish has spawned before and water temperature are all factors known to effect when and how many eggs each carp will spawn at any one time.

==== Siamese fighting fish ====
Prior to spawning, male Siamese fighting fish build bubble nests of varying sizes at the surface of the water. When a male becomes interested in a female, he will flare his gills, twist his body, and spread his fins. The female darkens in colour and curves her body back and forth. The act of spawning takes place in a "nuptial embrace" where the male wraps his body around the female, each embrace resulting in the release of 10–40 eggs until the female is out of eggs. The male, from his side, releases milt into the water and fertilization takes place externally. During and after spawning, the male uses his mouth to retrieve sinking eggs and deposit them in the bubble nest (during mating the female sometimes assists her partner, but more often she will simply devour all the eggs that she manages to catch). Once the female has released all of her eggs, she is chased away from the male's territory, as it is likely that she'll eat the eggs due to hunger. The eggs then remain in the male's care. He keeps them in the bubble nest, making sure none fall to the bottom and repairing the nest as needed. Incubation lasts for 24–36 hours, and the newly hatched larvae remain in the nest for the next 2–3 days, until their yolk sacs are fully absorbed. Afterwards the fry leave the nest and the free-swimming stage begins.

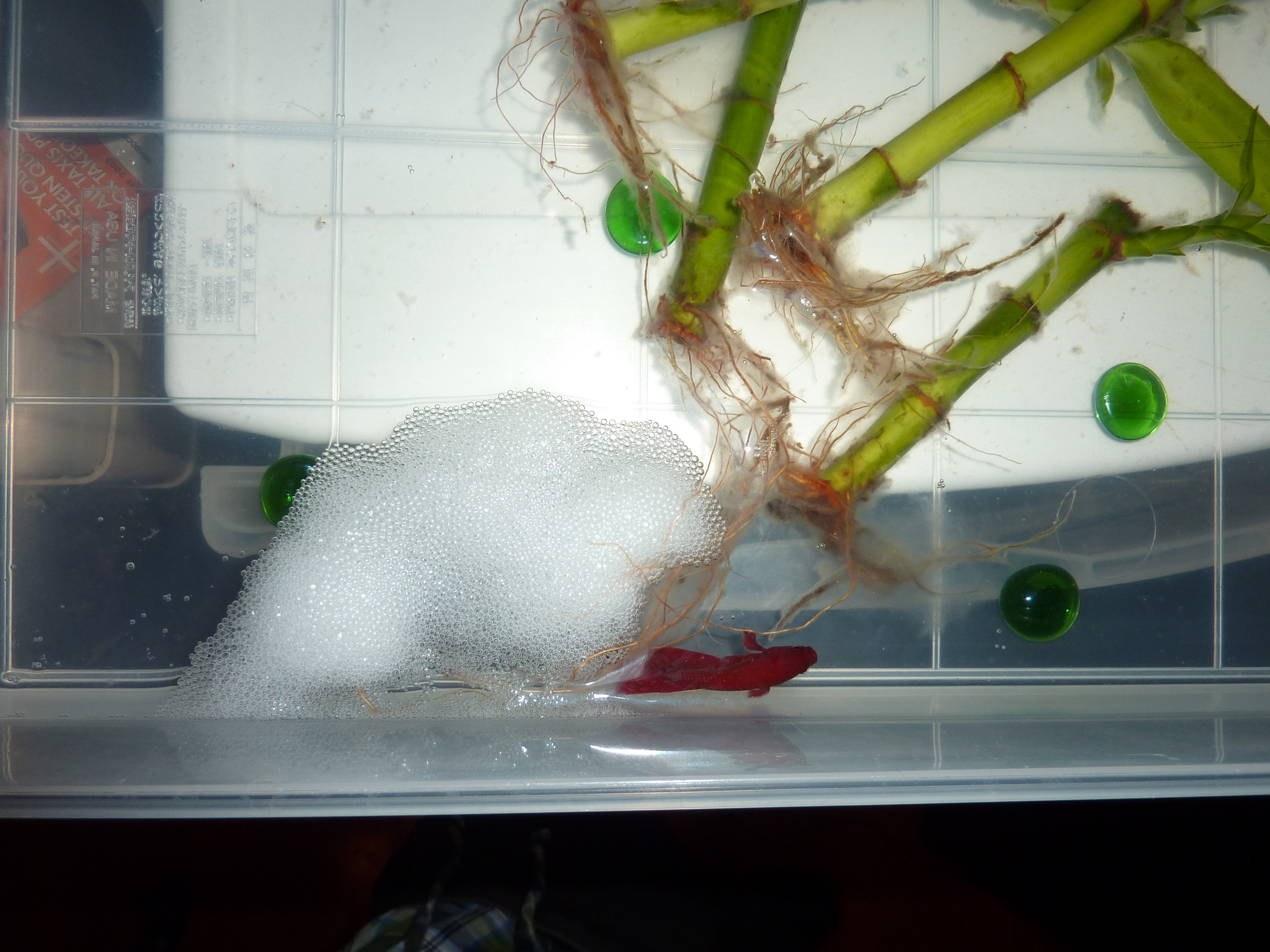
Siamese fighting fish build bubble nests of varying sizes.

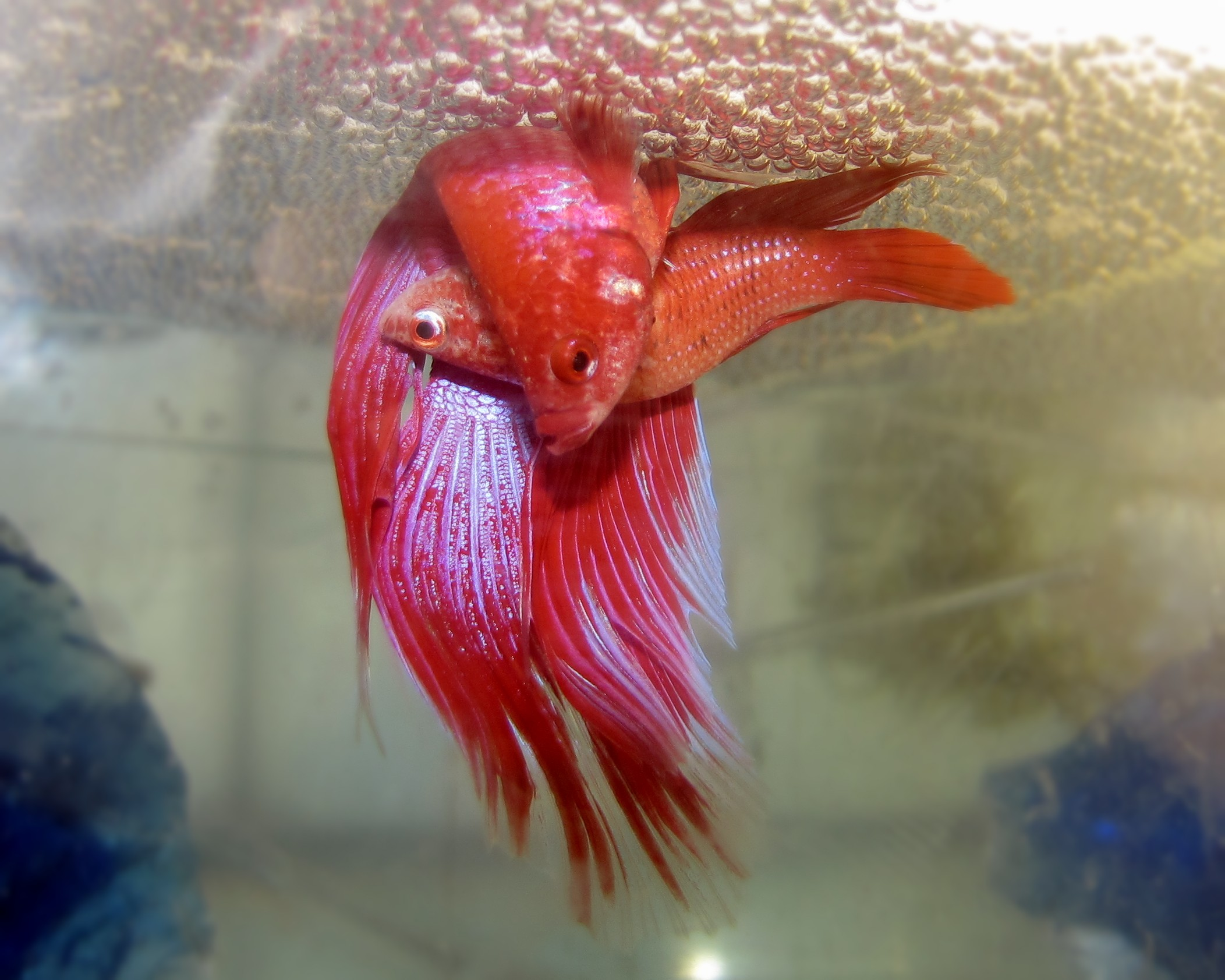
A pair of Siamese fighting fish spawning under their bubble nest.

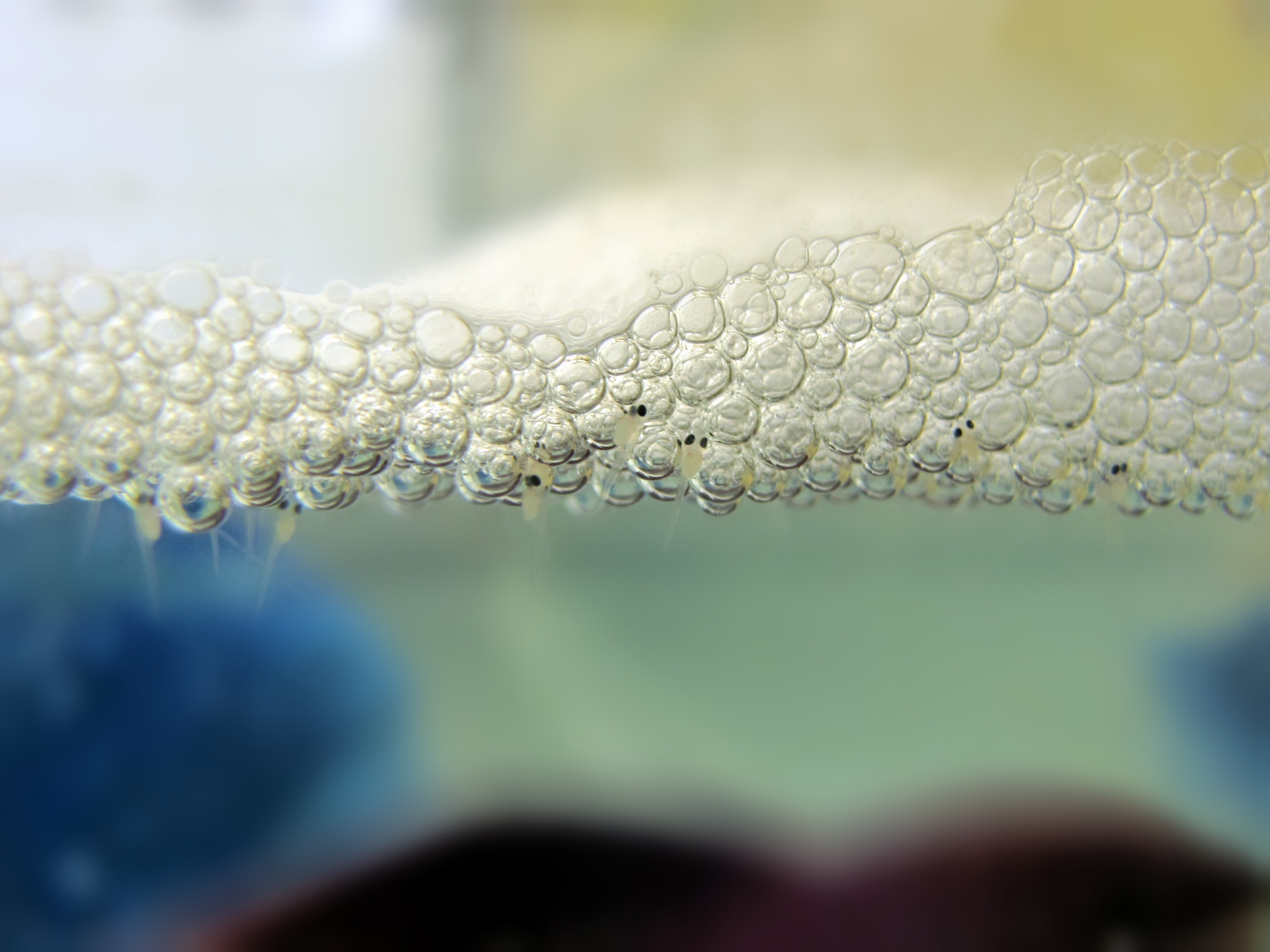
One-day-old Siamese fighting fish larvae in a bubble nest - their yolk sacs have not yet been absorbed

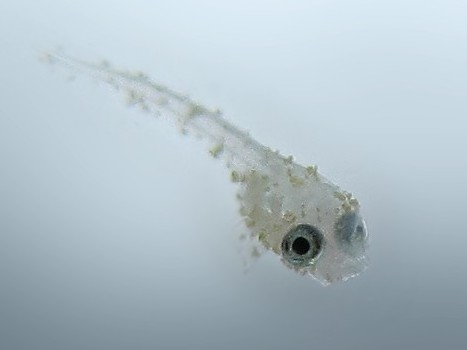
A 15-day-old free-swimming fry of a Siamese fighting fish

=== Crustaceans ===
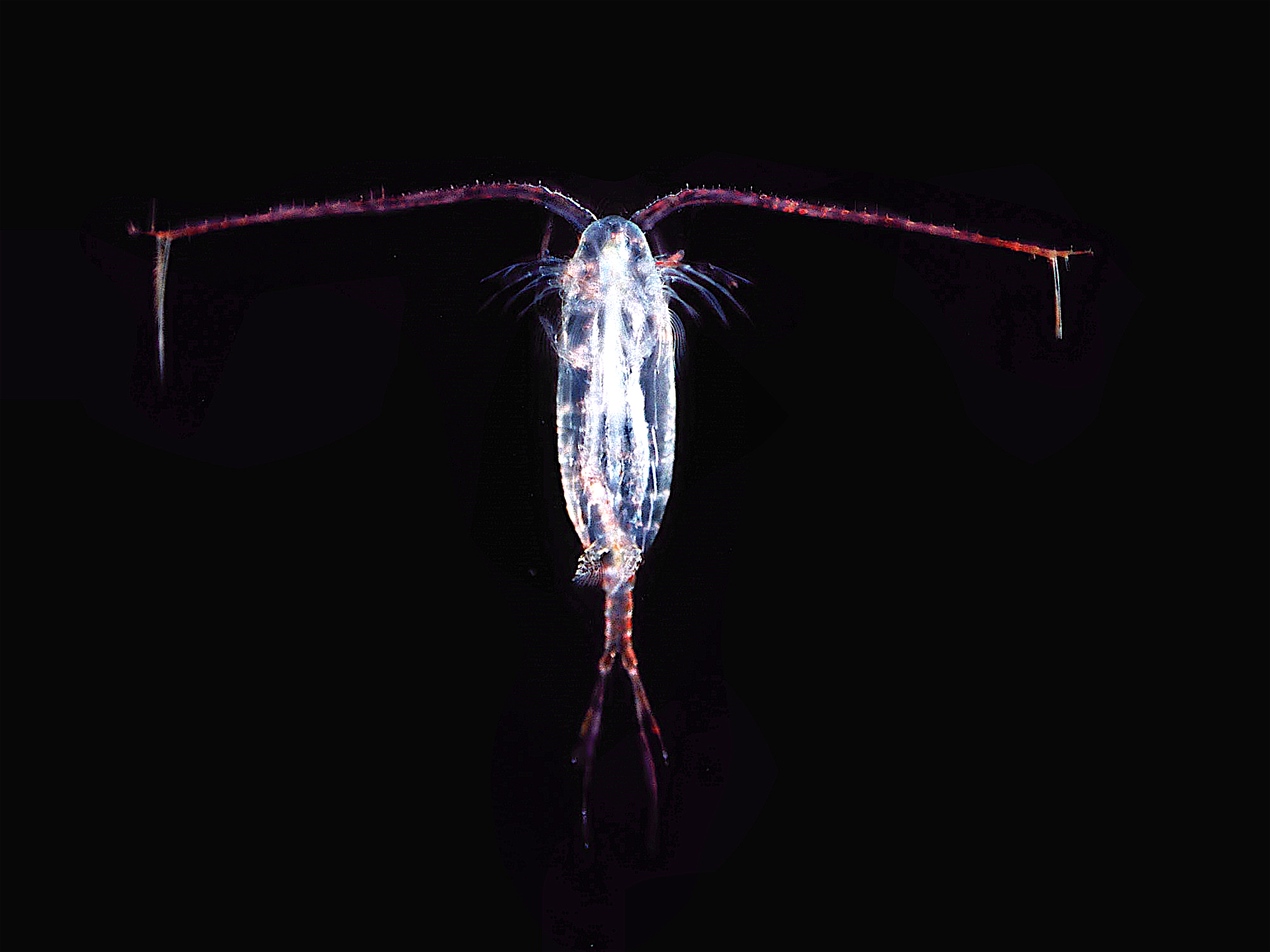
Copepod

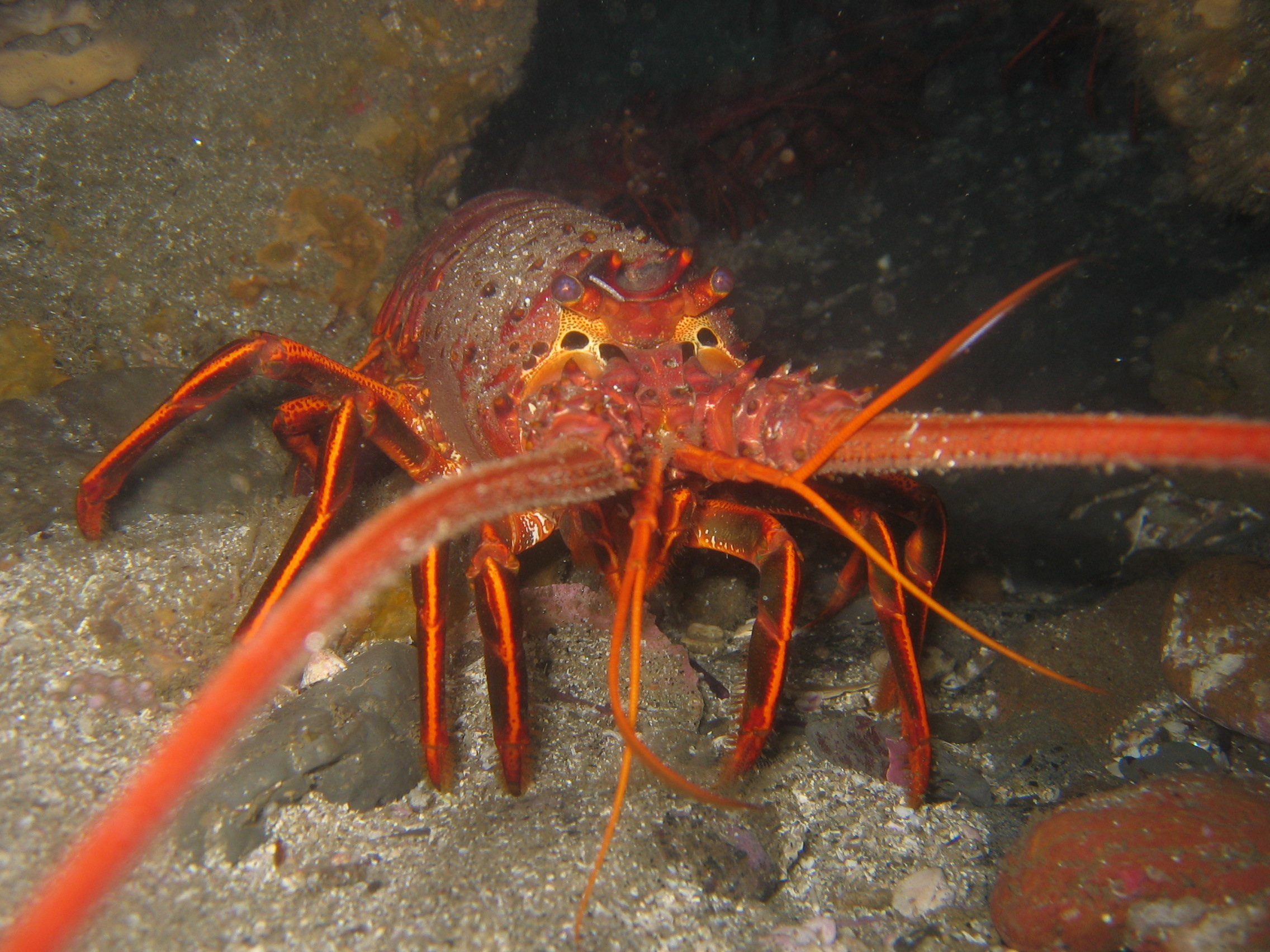
California spiny lobster External videos: Lobster migration train (from The Trials of Life)

==== Copepods ====
Copepods are tiny crustaceans which usually reproduce either by broadcast spawning or by sac spawning. Broadcasting copepods scatter their eggs into the water, but sac spawners lay their eggs into an ovigerous sac. Sac spawners spawn few but relatively large eggs that develop slowly. By contrast, broadcast spawners spawn numerous small eggs that develop rapidly. However, the shorter hatch times that result from broadcasting are not short enough to compensate for the higher mortality compared to sac spawners. To produce a given number of hatched eggs, broadcasters must spawn more eggs than sac spawners.

==== Spiny lobsters ====
After mating, the fertilized eggs of the California spiny lobster are carried on the female's pleopods until they hatch, with between 120,000 and 680,000 carried by a single female. The eggs begin coral red, but darken as they develop to a deep maroon. When she is carrying the eggs, the female is said to be "berried". The eggs are ready to hatch after 10 weeks, and spawning takes place from May to August. The larvae that hatch (called phyllosoma larvae) do not resemble the adults. Instead, they are flat, transparent animals around 14 mm (0.55 in) long, but as thin as a sheet of paper. The larvae feed on plankton, and grow through ten molts into ten further larval stages, the last of which is around 30–32 mm (1.2–1.3 in) long. The full series of larval molts takes around 7 months, and when the last stage molts, it metamorphoses into the puerulus state, which is a juvenile form of the adult, though still transparent. The puerulus larvae settle to the sea floor when the water is near its maximum temperature, which in Baja California is in the fall.

Egg-bearing female lobsters migrate inshore from deeper waters to hatch their eggs, though they do not have specific spawning grounds. These lobster migrations can occur in close single-file formation "lobster trains".

=== Molluscs ===
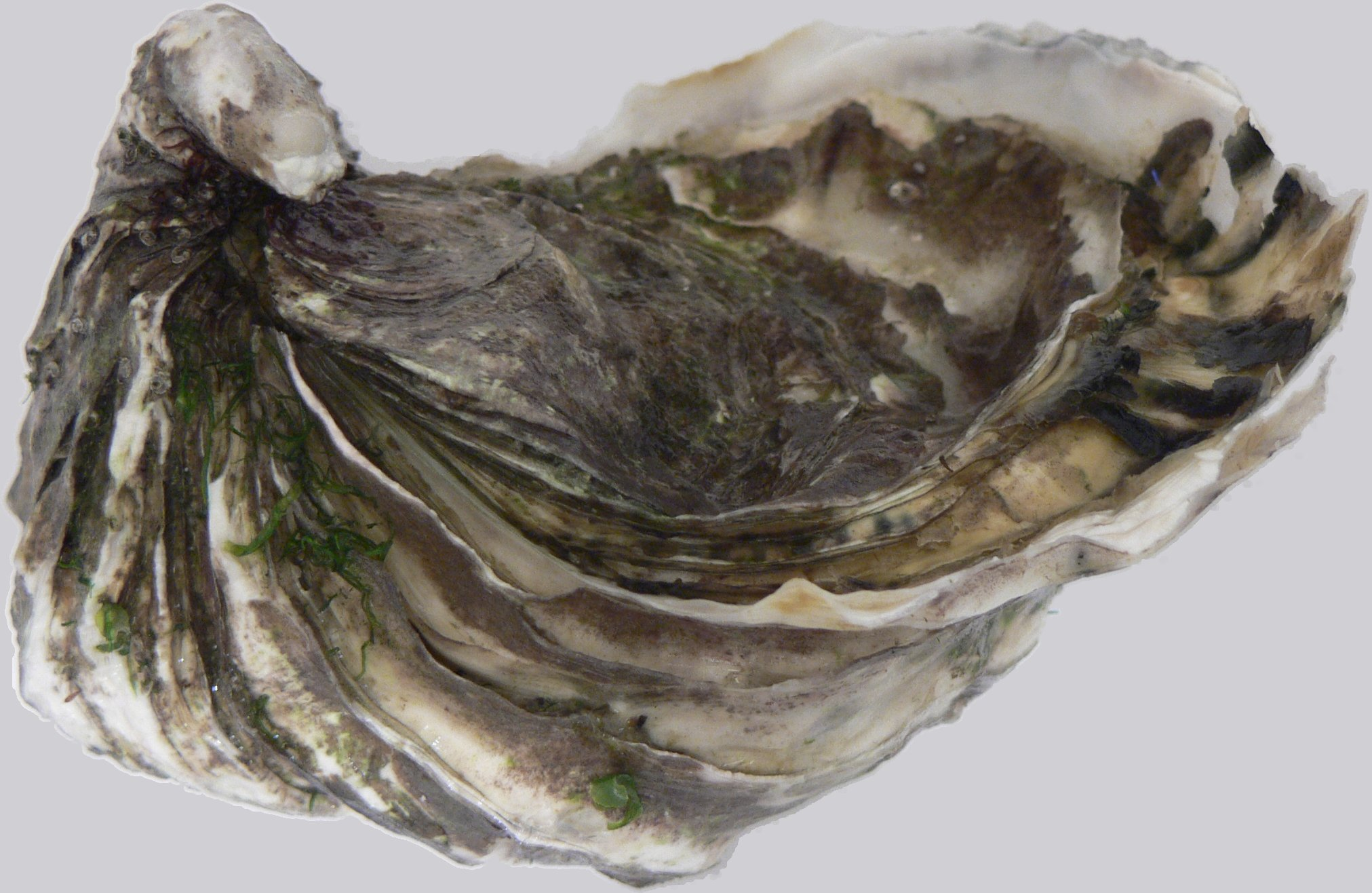
Pacific oyster

==== Pacific oysters ====
Oysters are broadcast spawners, that is, eggs and sperm are released into open water where fertilisation occurs. They are protandric; during their first year they spawn as males by releasing sperm into the water. As they grow over the next two or three years and develop greater energy reserves, they spawn as females by releasing eggs. Bay oysters usually spawn by the end of June. An increase in water temperature prompts a few oysters to spawn. This triggers spawning in the rest, clouding the water with millions of eggs and sperm. A single female oyster can produce up to 100 million eggs annually. The eggs become fertilized in the water and develop rapidly into planktonic larvae. which eventually find suitable sites, such as another oyster's shell, on which to settle. Attached oyster larvae are called spat. Spat are oysters less than 25 millimetres (0.98 in) long.

The Pacific oyster usually has separate sexes. Their sex can be determined by examining the gonads, and it can change from year to year, normally during the winter months. In certain environmental conditions, one sex is favoured over the other. Protandry is favoured in areas of high food abundance and protogyny occurs in areas of low food abundance. In habitats with a high food supply, the sex ratio in the adult population tends to favour females, and areas with low food abundances tend to have a larger proportion of male adults. Spawning in the Pacific oyster occurs at 20 °C (68 °F). This species is very fecund, with females releasing about 50–200 million eggs in regular intervals (at a rate of 5–10 times a minute) in a single spawning. Once released from the gonads, the eggs move through the suprabranchial chambers (gills), are then pushed through the gill ostia into the mantle chamber, and are finally released in the water, forming a small cloud. In males, the sperm is released at the opposite end of the oyster, along with the normal exhalent stream of water. A rise in water temperature is thought to be the main cue in the initiation of spawning, as the onset of higher water temperatures in the summer results in earlier spawning in the Pacific oyster.

The larvae of the Pacific oyster are planktotrophic, and are about 70 μm at the prodissoconch 1 stage. The larvae move through the water column via the use of a larval foot to find suitable settlement locations. They can spend several weeks at this phase, which is dependent on water temperature, salinity and food supply. Over these weeks, larvae can disperse great distances by water currents before they metamorphose and settle as small spat. Similar to other oyster species, once the Pacific oyster larvae find a suitable habitat, they attach to it permanently using cement secreted from a gland in their foot. After settlement, the larvae metamorphose into juvenile spat. The growth rate is very rapid in optimum environmental conditions, and market size can be achieved in 18 to 30 months.

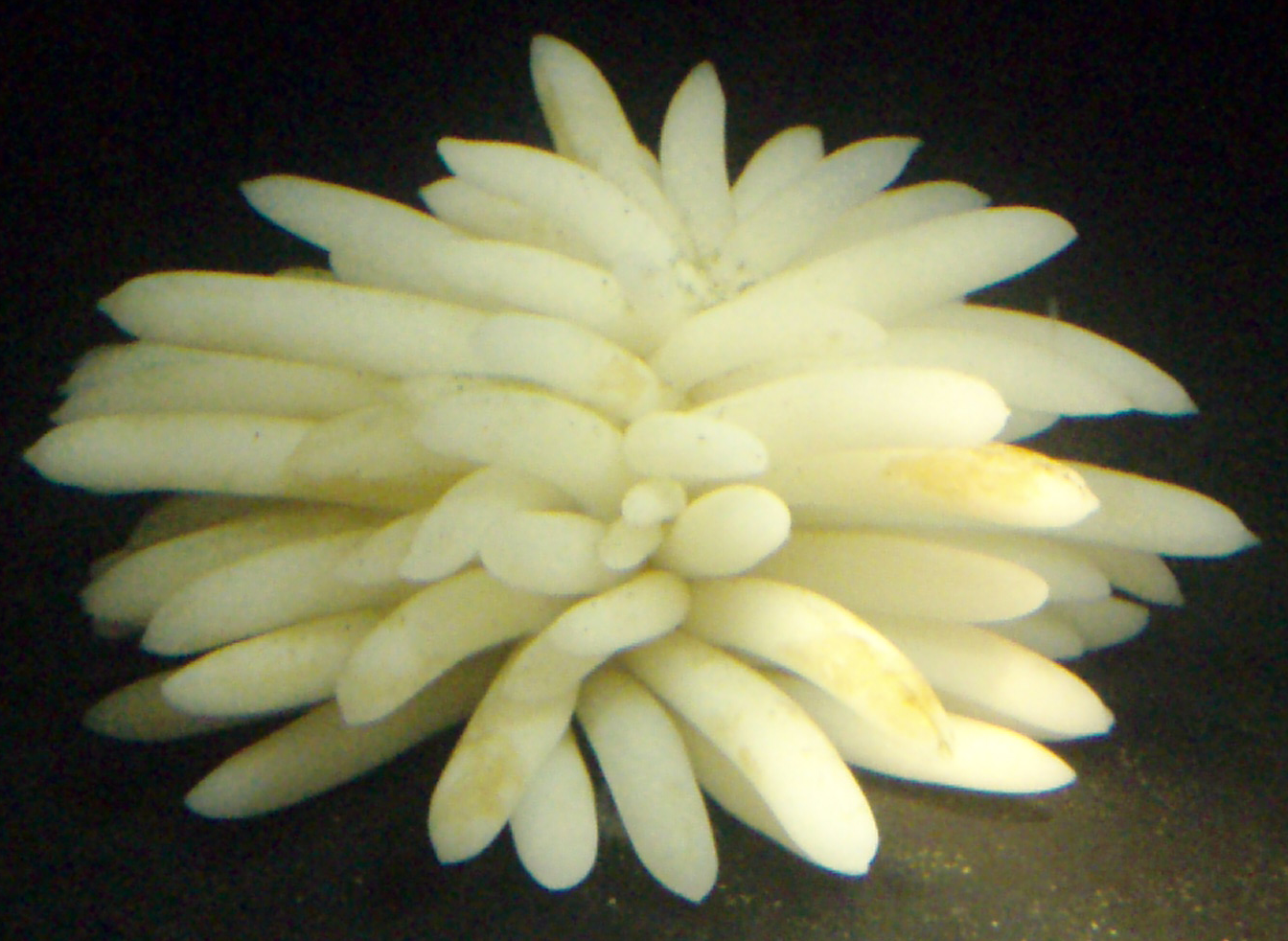
Egg cases laid by a female squid External videos: Squid spawning

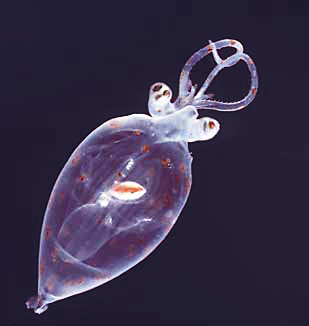
A juvenile squid

==== Cephalopods ====
Cephalopods, such as squid and octopuses, have prominent heads and a set of arms (tentacles) modified from the primitive foot of molluscs. All cephalopods are sexually dimorphic. However, they lack external sexual characteristics, so they use colour communication. A courting male approaches a likely looking mate flashing his brightest colours, often in rippling displays. If the other cephalopod is female and receptive, her skin will change colour to become pale, and mating will occur. If the other cephalopod remains brightly coloured, it is taken as a warning.

All cephalopods reproduce by spawning eggs. Most cephalopods use semi-internal fertilization where the male places his gametes inside the female's mantle cavity to fertilize the ova in the female's single ovary. The "penis" in most male cephalopods is a long and muscular end of the gonoduct used to transfer spermatophores to a modified sperm-carrying arm called a hectocotylus. That in turn is used to transfer the spermatophores to the female. In species where the hectocotylus is missing, the "penis" is long and able to extend beyond the mantle cavity and transfers the spermatophores directly to the female. In many cephalopods, mating occurs head-to-head and the male may simply transfer sperm to the female. Others may detach the sperm-carrying arm and leave it attached to the female. Deep water squid have the greatest known penis length relative to body size of all mobile animals, second in the entire animal kingdom only to certain sessile barnacles. Penis elongation in the greater hooked squid may result in a penis that is as long as the mantle, head and arms combined.

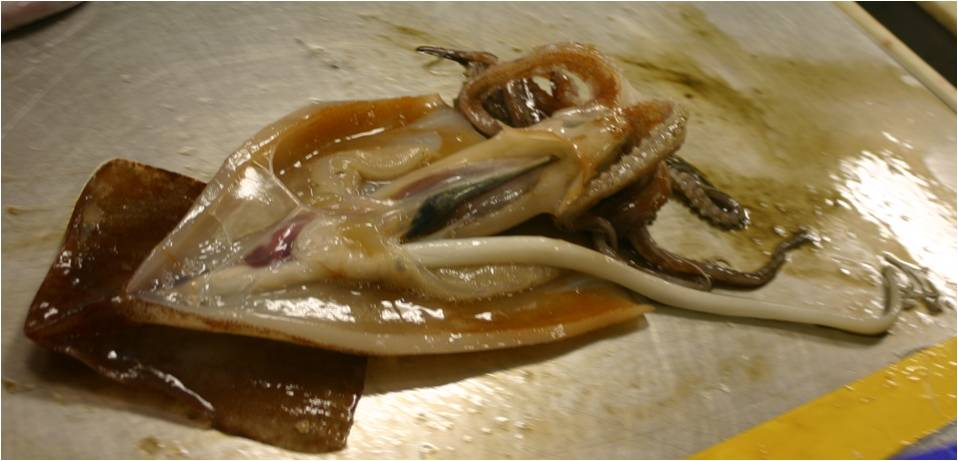
A greater hooked squid with an erect penis 67 cm long

Some species brood their fertilized eggs: female paper nautilus construct shelters for the young, while Gonatiid squid carry a larva-laden membrane from the hooks on their arms. Other cephalopods deposit their young under rocks and aerate them with their tentacles hatching. Mostly the eggs are left to their own devices; many squid lay sausage-like bunches of eggs in crevices or occasionally on the sea floor. Cuttlefish lay eggs separately in cases and attach them to coral or algal fronds. Like Pacific salmon, cephalopods are mostly semelparous, spawning many small eggs in one batch and then dying. Cephalopods usually live fast and die young. Most of the energy extracted from their food is used for growing, and they mature rapidly to their adult size. Some gain as much as 12% of their body mass each day. Most live for one to two years, reproducing and then dying shortly thereafter.

=== Echinoderms ===
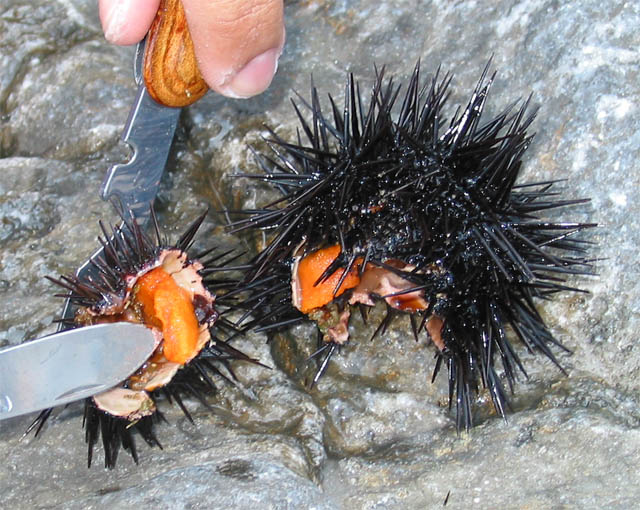
Sea urchins have five gonads. These gonads (roe) are a sought after as a delicacy. External videos: Sea urchin spawning

Echinoderms are marine animals, widespread in all oceans, but not found in fresh water. Just below their skin is an endoskeleton composed of calcareous plates or ossicles.

==== Sea urchins ====
Sea urchins are spiky echinoderms with spherical bodies which usually contain five gonads. They move slowly, feed mostly on seaweed, and are important for the diet of sea otters. Sea urchins are dioecious, having separate male and female sexes, although there is generally no easy way to distinguish the two. The gonads are lined with muscles underneath the peritoneum, and these allow the animal to squeeze its gametes through the duct and into the surrounding sea water, where fertilization takes place. Their roe (male and female gonads) is soft and melting, with a colour ranging from orange to pale yellow, and is sought after as a human delicacy in many parts of the world.

==== Sea cucumbers ====
Sea cucumbers are leathery echinoderms with elongated bodies which contain a single, branched gonad. They are found on the sea floor worldwide, and occur in great numbers on the deep sea floor where they often make up the majority of the animal biomass. They feed on plankton and decaying organic debris found at the sea bottom, catching food that flows by with their open tentacles or sifting through bottom sediments. Like sea urchins, most sea cucumbers reproduce by releasing sperm and ova into the ocean water. Depending on conditions, one organism can produce thousands of gametes.

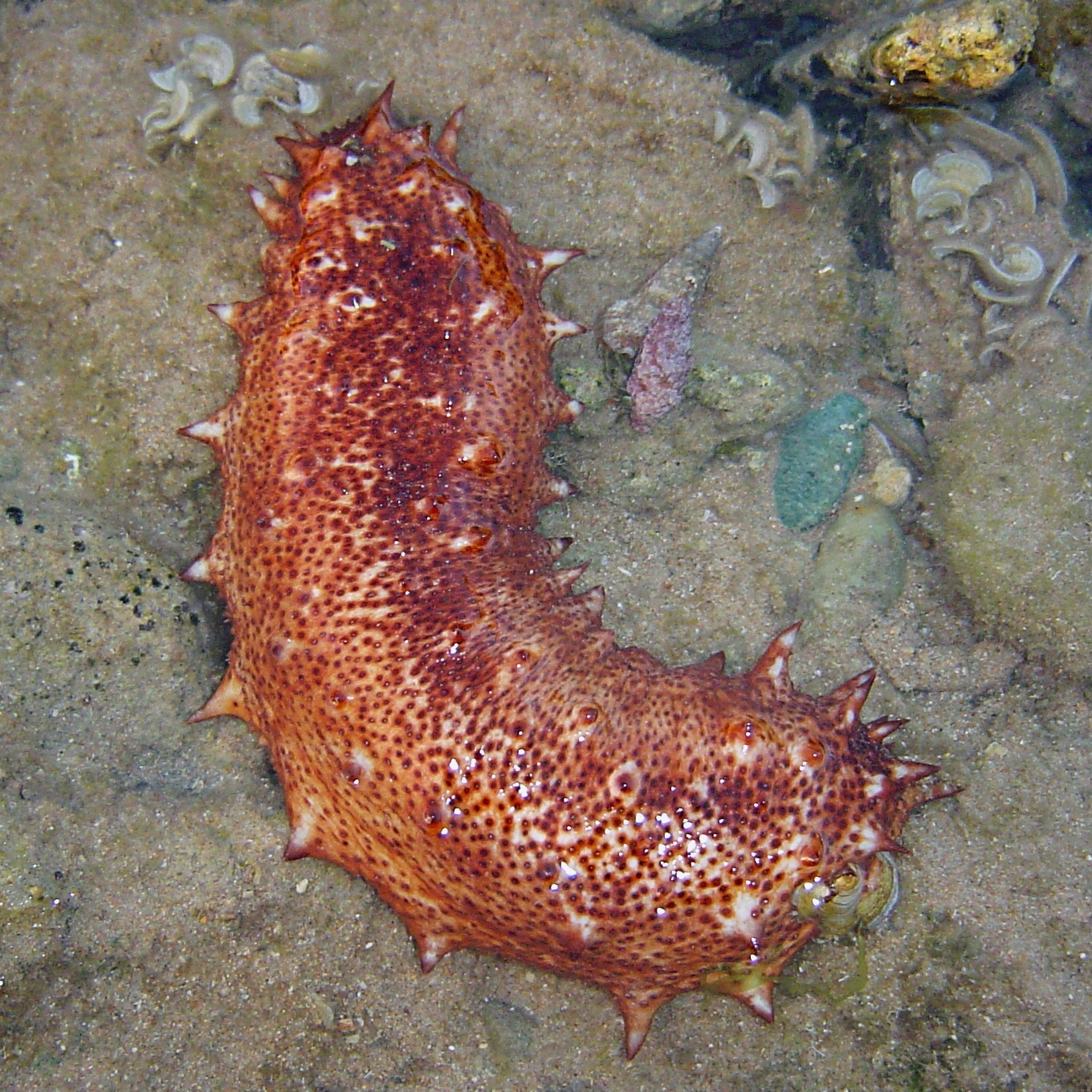
Sea cucumbers have one gonad

Sea cucumbers are typically dioecious, with separate male and female individuals. The reproductive system consists of a single gonad, consisting of a cluster of tubules emptying into a single duct that opens on the upper surface of the animal, close to the tentacles. Many species fertilise their eggs internally. The fertilised egg develops in a pouch on the adult's body and eventually hatches as a juvenile sea cucumber. A few species brood their young inside the body cavity, giving birth through a small rupture in the body wall close to the anus. The remaining species develop their eggs into a free-swimming larva, usually after about three days of development. This larva swims by means of a long band of cilia wrapped around its body. As the larva grows it transforms into a barrel-shaped body with three to five separate rings of cilia. The tentacles are usually the first adult features to appear, before the regular tube feet.

=== Amphibious animals ===
Amphibians have successfully solved most of the problems associated with exposure to air. But their reproductive system was and is linked to water, and it remains very fishlike. Almost all amphibians spawn in water and lay a great number of small eggs that hatch quickly into swimming larvae. The eggs do not need any complex protection against drying, because if the environment dries, the larvae are doomed as well as the eggs. Thus selection has acted to encourage the selection of suitable sites for laying eggs, rather than suitable devices for protecting eggs. Both fishes and amphibians may migrate long distances for spawning, and favoured sites are often disputed vigorously.

— Richard Cowen

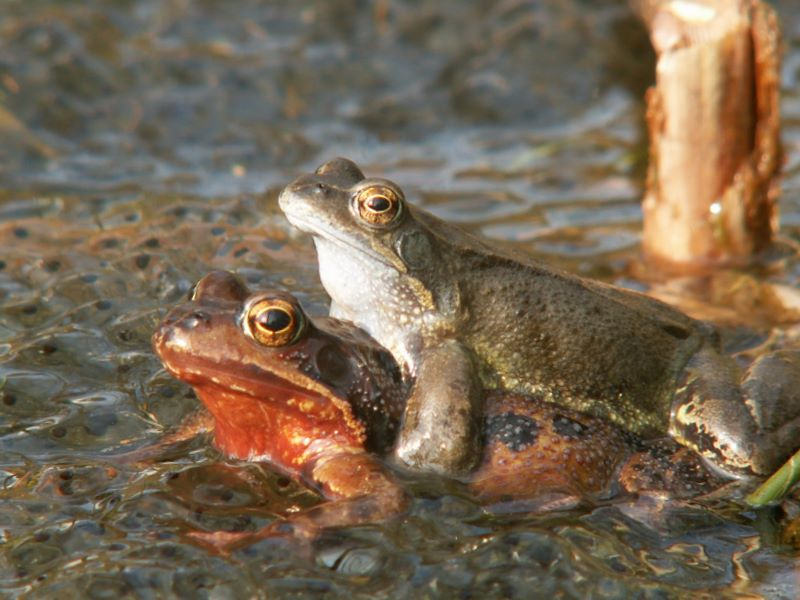
Common frogs sorting out their spawn

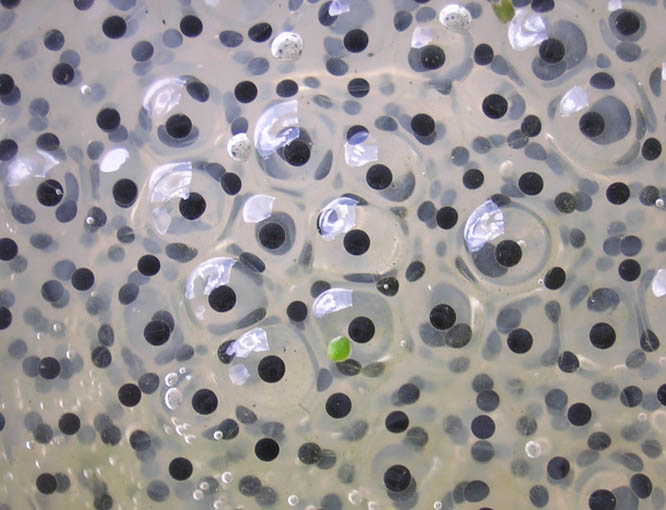
Frog spawn up close

Frog spawn development

Amphibians are found in and around fresh water lakes and ponds, but not in marine environments. Examples are frogs and toads, salamanders, newts and caecilians (which resemble snakes). They are cold-blooded animals that metamorphose from a juvenile water-breathing form, usually to an adult air-breathing form, though mudpuppies retain juvenile gills in adulthood.

==== Frogs and toads ====
Female frogs and toads usually spawn gelatinous egg masses containing thousands of eggs in water. Different species lay eggs in distinctive and identifiable ways. For example, the American toad lays long strings of eggs. The eggs are highly vulnerable to predation, so frogs have evolved many techniques to ensure the survival of the next generation. In colder areas the embryo is black to absorb more heat from the sun, which speeds up development. Most commonly, this involves synchronous reproduction. Many individuals will breed at the same time, overwhelming the actions of predators; the majority of the offspring will still die due to predation, but there is a greater chance some will survive. Another way in which some species avoid predators and the pathogens eggs are exposed to in ponds is to lay eggs on leaves above the pond, with a gelatinous coating designed to retain moisture. In these species the tadpoles drop into the water upon hatching. The eggs of some species laid out of water can detect vibrations of nearby predatory wasps or snakes, and will hatch early to avoid being eaten.

While the length of the egg stage depends on the species and environmental conditions, aquatic eggs generally hatch within one week. Unlike salamanders and newts, frogs and toads never become sexually mature while still in their larval stage. The hatched eggs continue life as tadpoles, which typically have oval bodies and long, vertically flattened tails. As a general rule, free living larvae are fully aquatic. They lack eyelids and have a cartilaginous skeleton, a lateral line system, gills for respiration (external gills at first, internal gills later) and tails with dorsal and ventral folds of skin for swimming. They quickly develop a gill pouch that covers the gills and the front legs; the lungs are also developed at an early stage as an accessory breathing organ. Some species which go through the metamorphosis inside the egg and hatch to small frogs never develop gills; instead there are specialised areas of skin that take care of respiration. Tadpoles also lack true teeth, but the jaws in most species usually have two elongate, parallel rows of small keratinized structures called keradonts in the upper jaw while the lower jaw has three rows of keradonts, surrounded by a horny beak, but the number of rows can be lower (sometimes zero), or much higher. Tadpoles feed on algae, including diatoms filtered from the water through the gills. Some species are carnivorous at the tadpole stage, eating insects, smaller tadpoles, and fish. Cannibalism has been observed among tadpoles. Early developers who gain legs may be eaten by the others, so the late bloomers survive longer.

==== Sea turtles ====
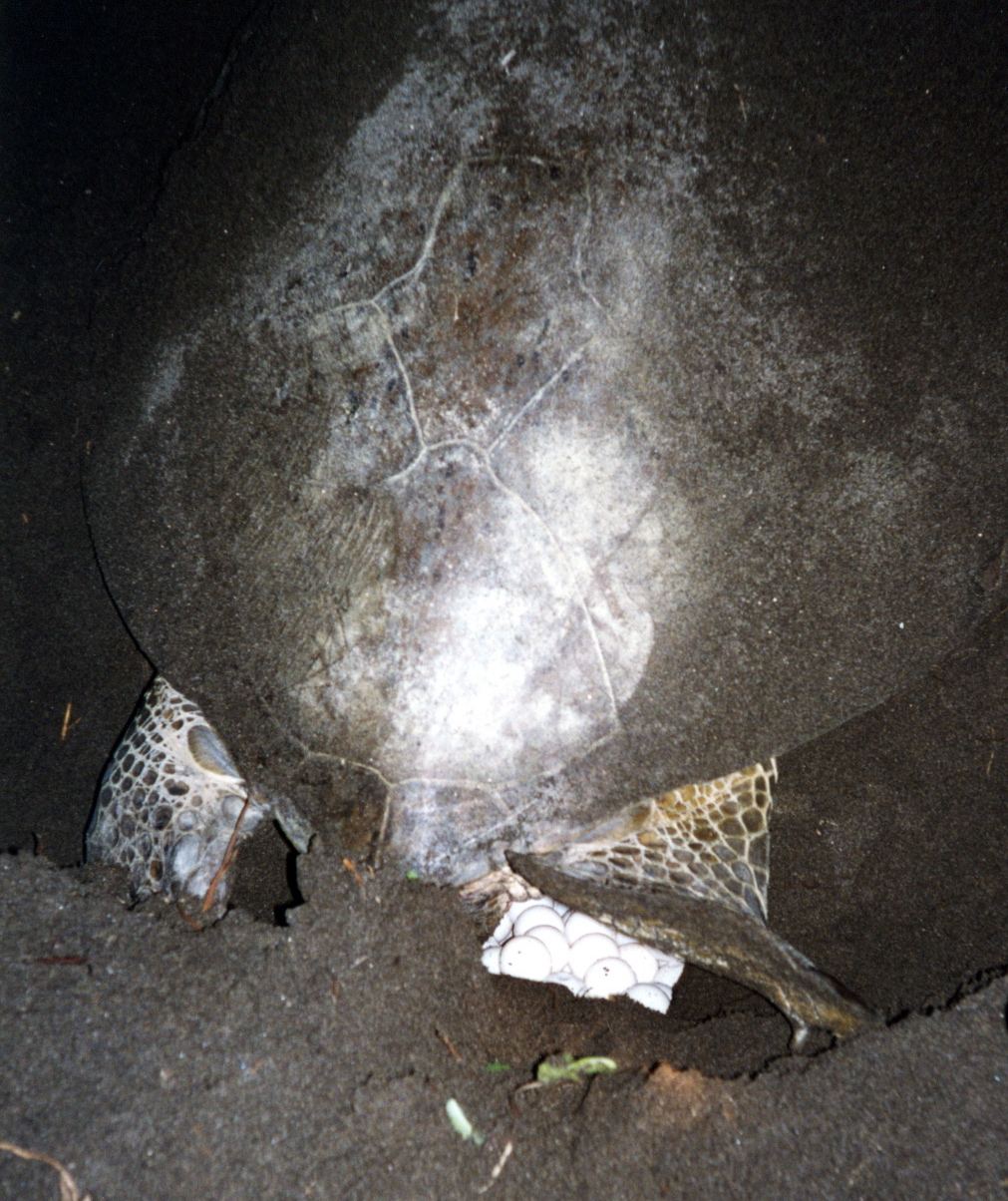
Sea turtle laying eggs External videos: Spawning sea turtle

Sea turtles are amphibious reptiles, but they are not amphibians. Reptiles belong to the class Reptilia while amphibians belong to the class Amphibia. These are two distinct taxonomic groups. Reptiles have scales and leathery skins, while the skins of amphibians are smooth and porous. Unlike frogs, sea turtle eggs have tough, leathery shells which allow them to survive on land without drying out.

Some sea turtles migrate long distances between feeding and spawning grounds. Green turtles have feeding grounds along the Brazilian coast. Each year, thousands of these turtles migrate about 2,300 kilometres (1,400 mi) to their spawning ground, Ascension Island in the Atlantic, an island only 11 kilometres (6.8 mi) across. Each year the returning turtles dig between 6,000 and 15,000 nests, often returning to the same beach from where they hatched. Females usually mate every two to four years. Males on the other hand visit the breeding areas every year, attempting to mate. Green sea turtles' mating is similar to other marine turtles. Female turtles control the process. A few populations practice polyandry, although this does not seem to benefit hatchlings. After mating in the water, the female moves above the beach's high tide line where she digs a hole with her hind flippers and deposits her eggs. Litter size depends on the age of the female and species, but green turtle clutches range between 100 and 200. She then covers the nest with sand and returns to the sea.

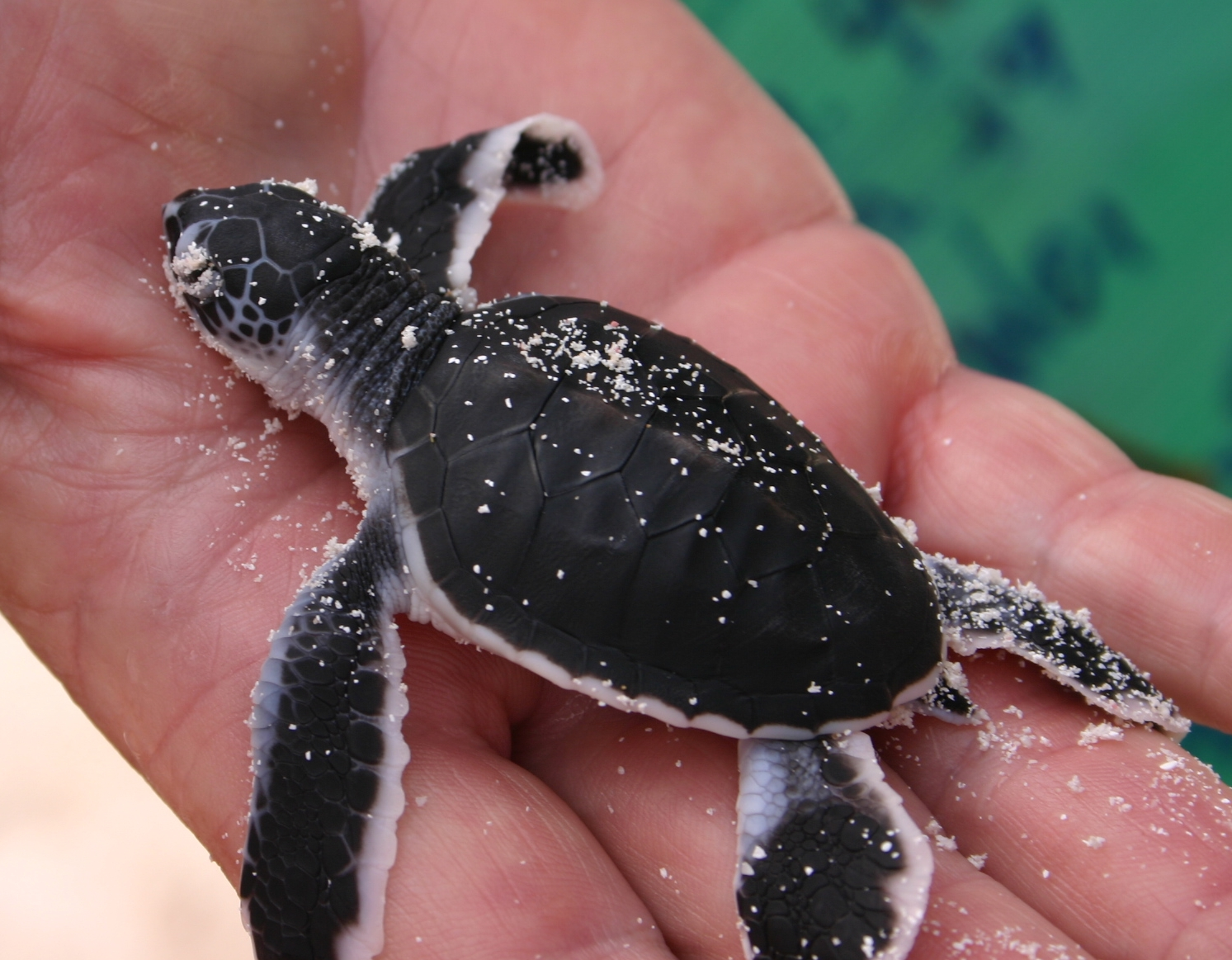
Green turtle hatchling

At around 45 to 75 days, the eggs hatch during the night and the hatchlings instinctively head directly into the water. This is the most dangerous time in a turtle's life. As they walk, predators such as gulls and crabs grab them. A significant percentage never make it to the ocean. Little is known of the initial life history of newly hatched sea turtles. Juveniles spend three to five years in the open ocean before they settle as still-immature juveniles into their permanent shallow-water lifestyle. It is speculated that they take twenty to fifty years to reach sexual maturity. Individuals live up to eighty years in the wild. They are among the larger sea turtles, many more than a meter long and weighing up to 300 kilograms (660 lb).

=== Aquatic insects ===
Aquatic insects also spawn. Mayflies "are famed for their short adult life. Some species have under an hour to mate and lay their eggs before they die. Their pre-adult stage, known as the subimago, may be even shorter - perhaps lasting just a few minutes before they moult into their adult form. Therefore a mayfly spends most of its life as a nymph, hidden from view under the water."

=== Corals ===
Life cycles of broadcasters and brooders

Corals can be both gonochoristic (unisexual) and hermaphroditic, each of which can reproduce sexually and asexually. Reproduction also allows corals to settle new areas.

Corals predominantly reproduce sexually. 25% of hermatypic corals (stony corals) form single sex (gonochoristic) colonies, while the rest are hermaphroditic. About 75% of all hermatypic corals "broadcast spawn" by releasing gametes—eggs and sperm—into the water to spread offspring. The gametes fuse during fertilization to form a microscopic larva called a planula, typically pink and elliptical in shape. A typical coral colony form several thousand larvae per year to overcome the odds against formation of a new colony.

Planulae exhibit positive phototaxis, swimming towards light to reach surface waters where they drift and grow before descending to seek a hard surface to which they can attach and establish a new colony. They also exhibit positive sonotaxis, moving towards sounds that emanate from the reef and away from open water. High failure rates afflict many stages of this process, and even though millions of gametes are released by each colony very few new colonies form. The time from spawning to settling is usually 2–3 days, but can be up to 2 months. The larva grows into a polyp and eventually becomes a coral head by asexual budding and growth.

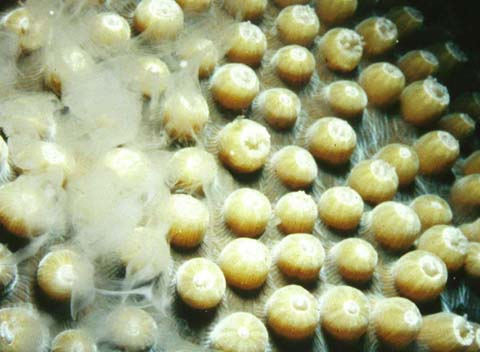
A male star coral, Montastraea cavernosa, releases sperm into the water

Synchronous spawning is very typical on the coral reef and often, even when multiple species are present, all corals spawn on the same night. This synchrony is essential so that male and female gametes can meet. Corals must rely on environmental cues, varying from species to species, to determine the proper time to release gametes into the water. The cues involve lunar changes, sunset time, and possibly chemical signalling. Synchronous spawning may form hybrids and is perhaps involved in coral speciation. In some places the spawn can be visually dramatic, clouding the usually clear water with gametes, typically at night.

Corals use two methods for sexual reproduction, which differ in whether the female gametes are released:

- Broadcasters, the majority of which mass spawn, rely heavily on environmental cues, because they release both sperm and eggs into the water. The corals use long-term cues such as day length, water temperature, and/or rate of temperature change. The short-term cue is most often the lunar cycle, with sunset cuing the release. About 75% of coral species are broadcasters, the majority of which are hermatypic, or reef-building corals. The positively buoyant gametes float towards the surface where fertilization produces planula larvae. The larvae swim towards the surface light to enter into currents, where they usually remain for two days, but sometimes up to three weeks, and in one known case two months, after which they settle and metamorphose into polyps and form colonies.
- Brooders are most often ahermatypic (non-reef building) in areas of high current or wave action. Brooders release only sperm, which is negatively buoyant, and can harbor unfertilized eggs for weeks, lowering the need for mass synchronous spawning events, which do sometimes occur. After fertilization the corals release planula larvae which are ready to settle.

== Fungi ==
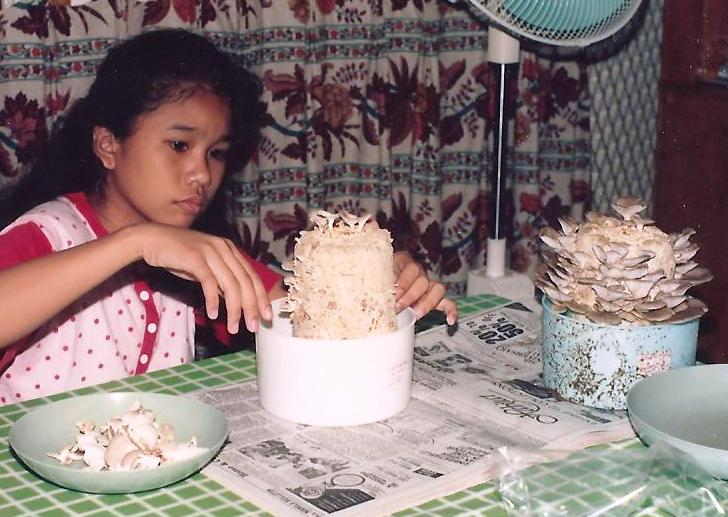
Harvesting oyster mushroom Pleurotus ostreatus cultivated using spawns embedded in sawdust mixture placed in plastic containers

Fungi are not plants, and require different conditions for optimal growth. Plants develop through photosynthesis, a process that converts atmospheric carbon dioxide into carbohydrates, especially cellulose. While sunlight provides an energy source for plants, mushrooms derive all of their energy and growth materials from their growth medium, through biochemical decomposition processes. This does not mean that light is an unnecessary requirement, since some fungi use light as a signal to induce fruiting. However, all the materials for growth must already be present in the growth medium. Instead of seeds, mushrooms reproduce sexually during underground growth, and asexually through spores. Either of these can be contaminated with airborne microorganisms, which will interfere with mushroom growth and prevent a healthy crop. Mycelium, or actively growing mushroom culture, is placed on growth substrate to seed or introduce mushrooms to grow on a substrate. This is also known as inoculation, spawning or adding spawn. Its main advantages are to reduce chances of contamination while giving mushrooms a firm beginning.

== Gallery ==
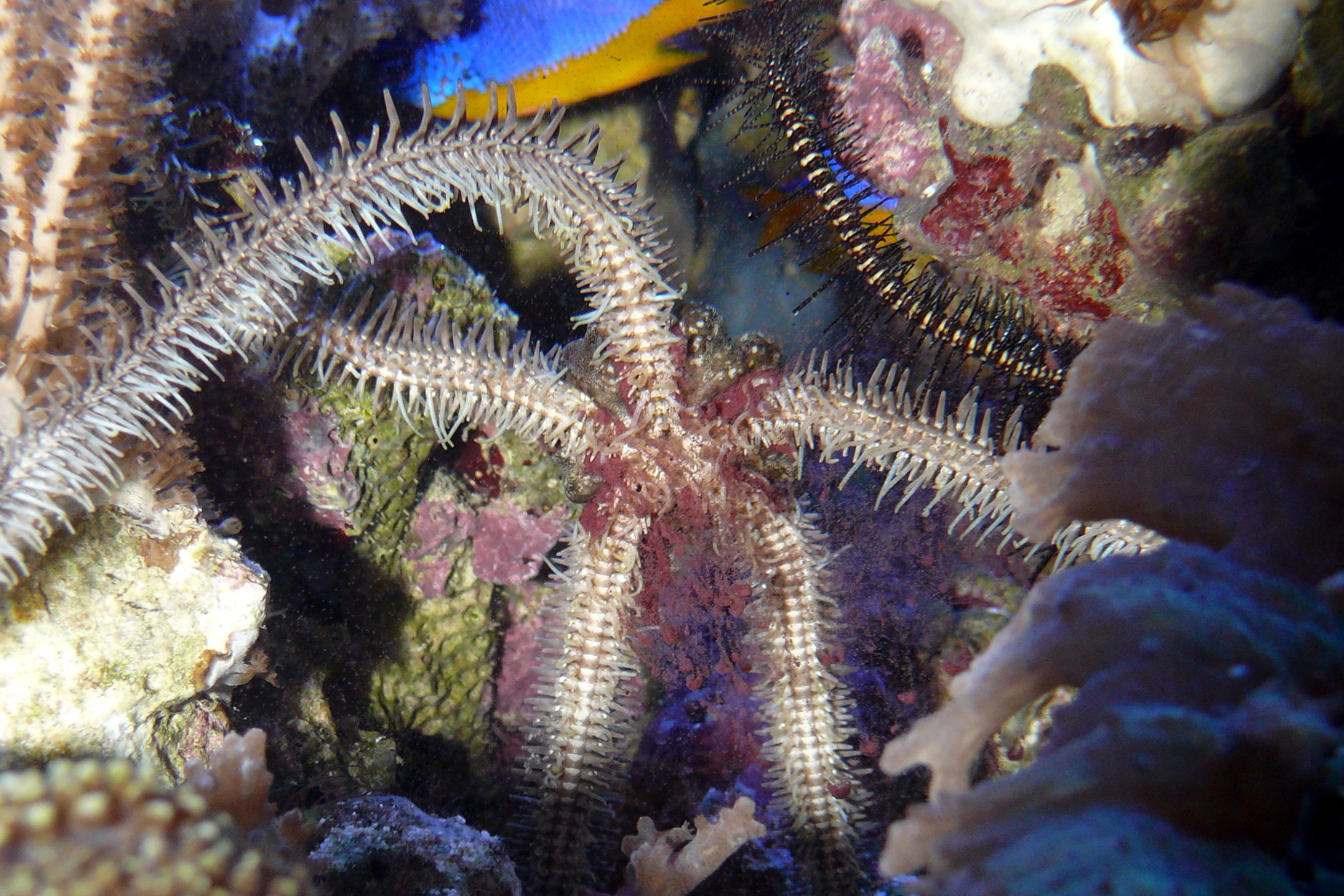
Spawning brittle star

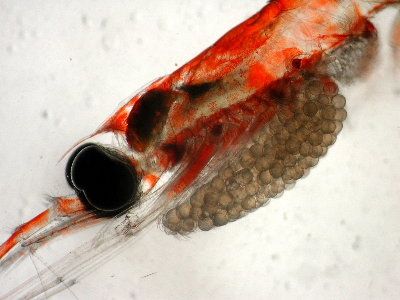
Head of female krill with her brood sac

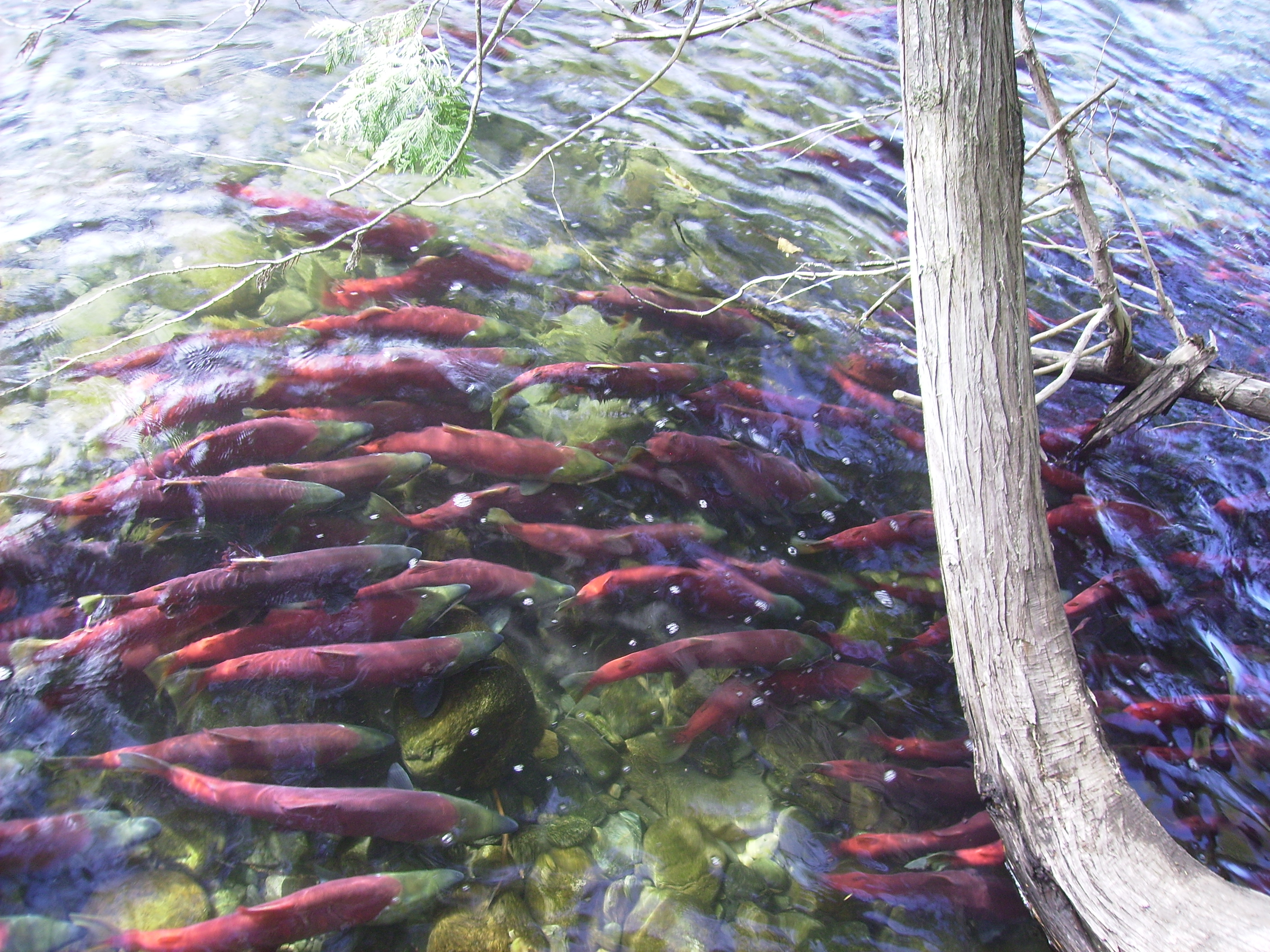
Spawning sockeye salmon

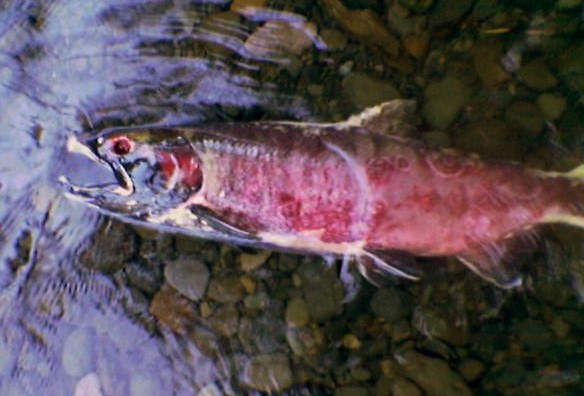
Dead salmon after spawning

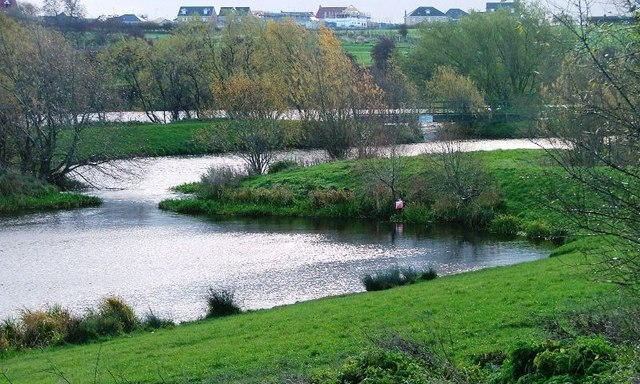
These lagoons, connected to the River Tees, provide a quiet backwater for fish to spawn and to take refuge in times of high water levels

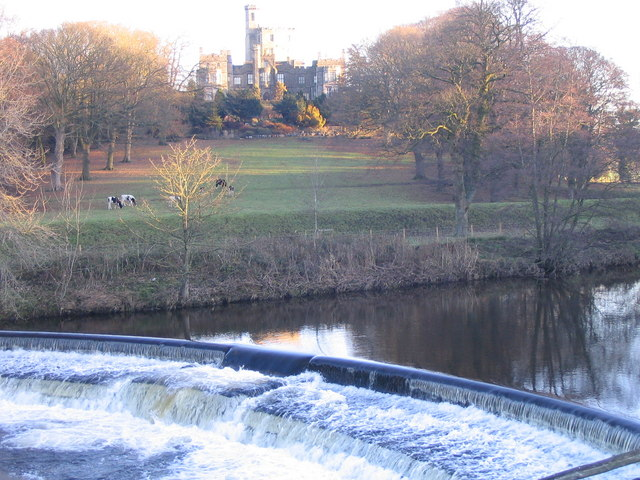
In the middle of this weir is a fish ladder, which allows trout and salmon to pass the weir to go upriver to spawn.

== See also ==
- Anadromous
- Egg case
- Federal Inventory of Amphibian Spawning Areas
- Ichthyoplankton
- Juvenile fish
- Milt
- Mouthbrooder
- Reproduction
- Salmon run
- Spawning bed
- Spawning triggers
- Stream pool
