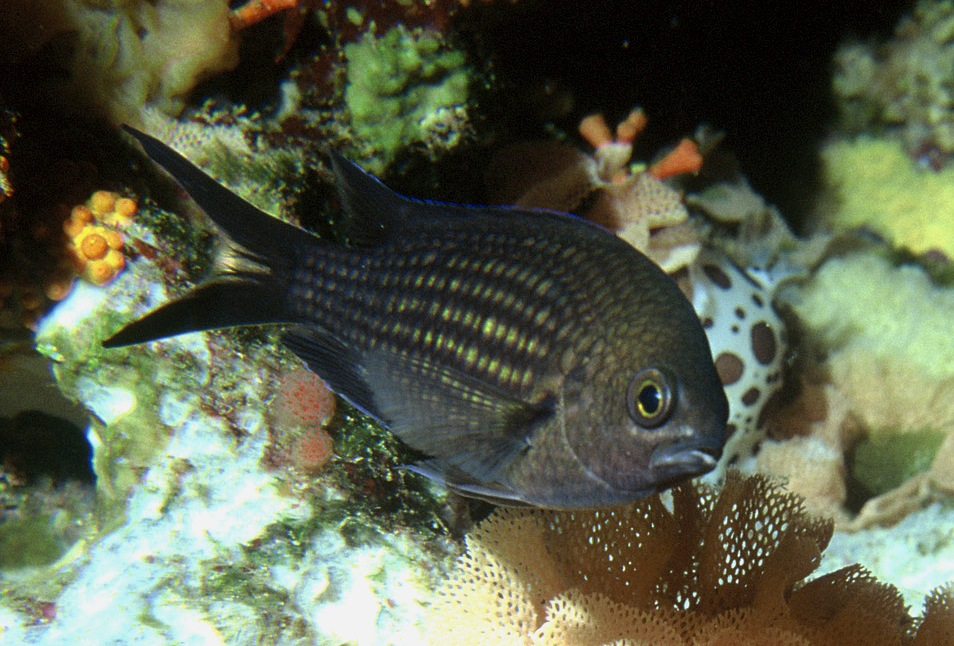
- Chromis chromis

Scientific classification
- Kingdom: Animalia
- Phylum: Chordata
- Class: Actinopterygii
- Division: Teleostei
- Order: Blenniiformes
- Family: Pomacentridae
- Subfamily: Chrominae
- Genus: Chromis; G. Cuvier, 1814

Type species
- Sparus chromis Linnaeus, 1758

Species
- Around 100, see text.

= Chromis =

Chromis Temporal range: 11–0 Ma Late Miocene to present

Genus of fishes

Chromis is a genus of fish in the family Pomacentridae. While the term damselfish describes a group of marine fish including more than one genus, Chromis is the largest genus of damselfishes. Certain species within the genus are common in the aquarium trade.

== Species ==
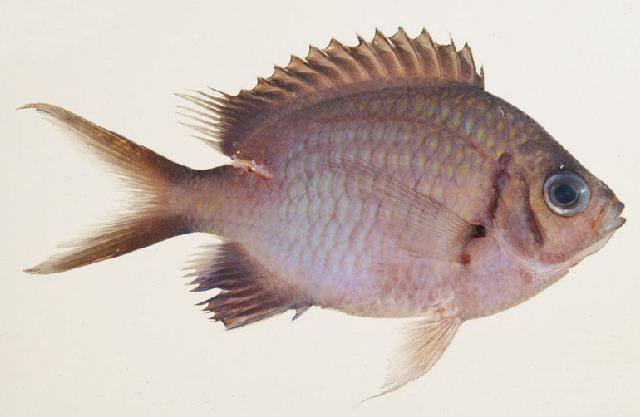
Chromis alpha

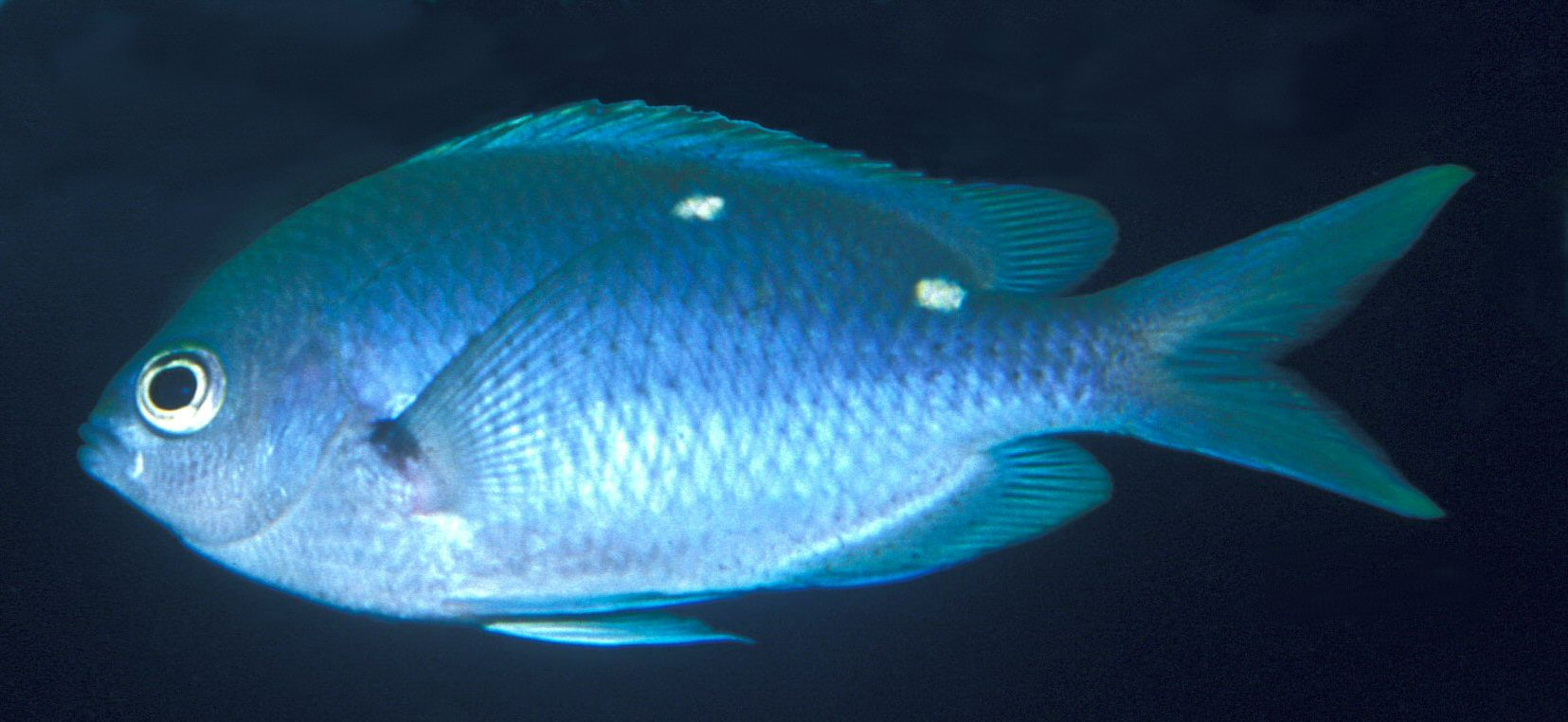
Chromis dispilus

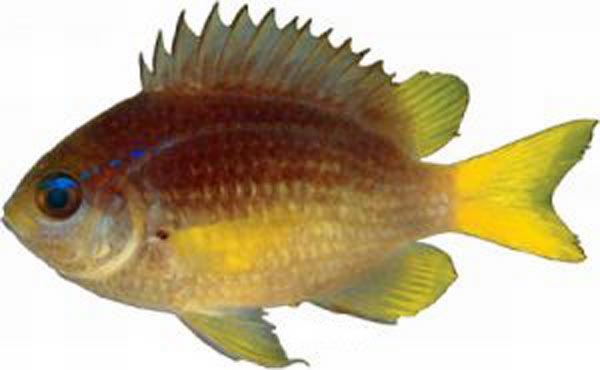
Chromis enchrysura

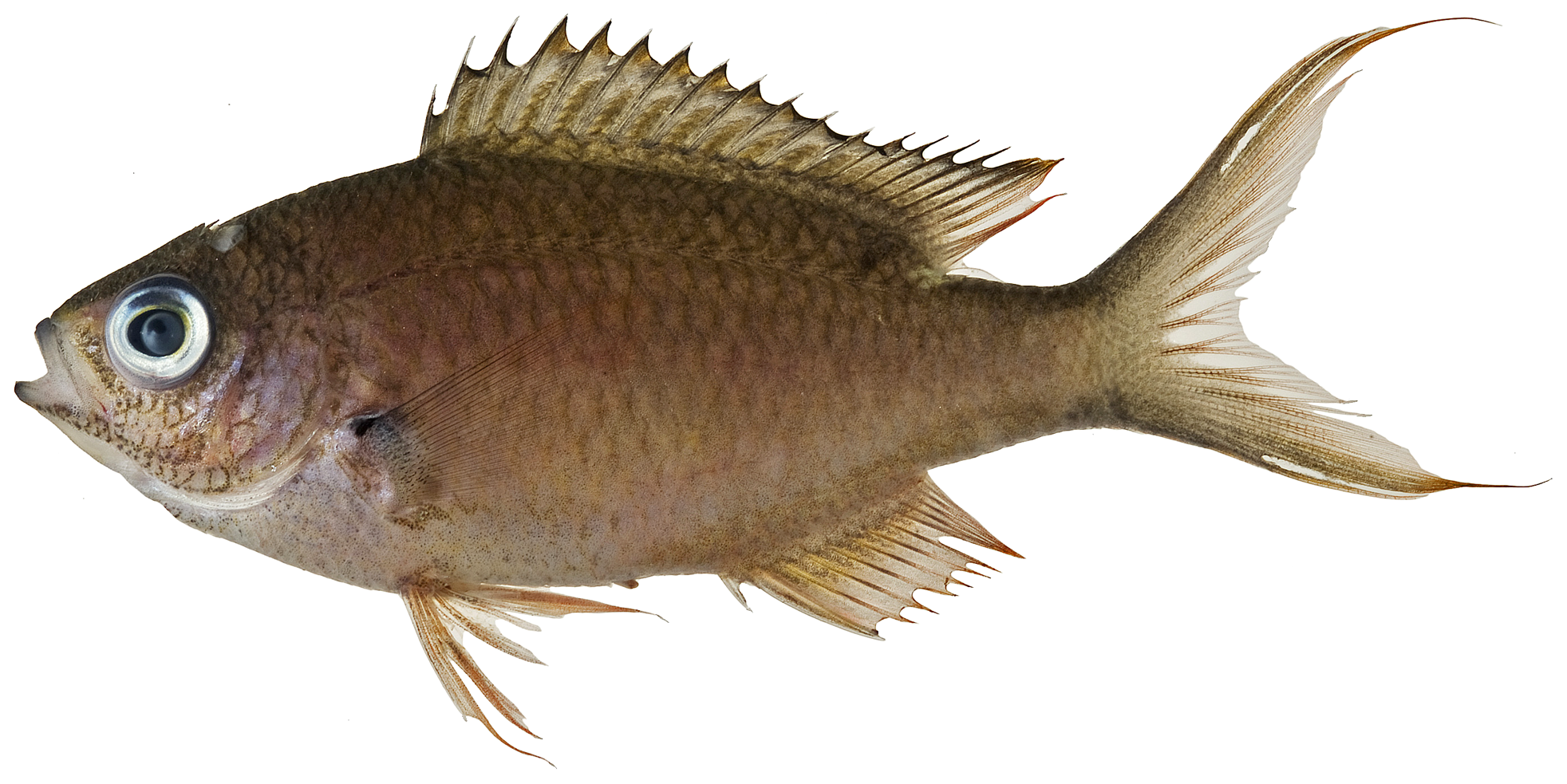
Chromis multilineata

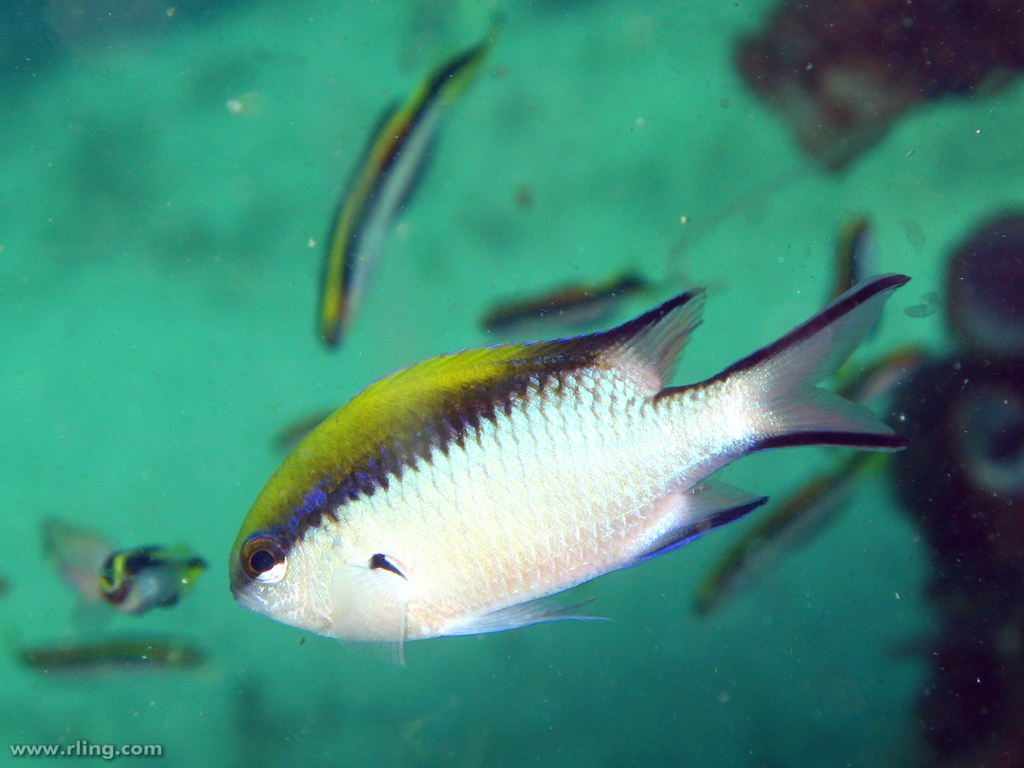
Chromis nitida

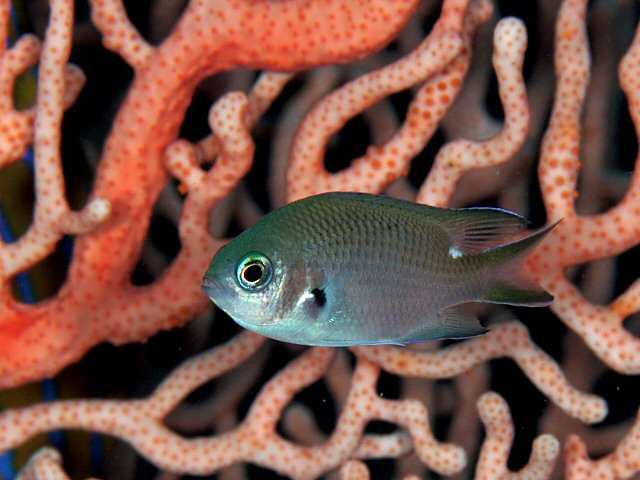
Chromis notata

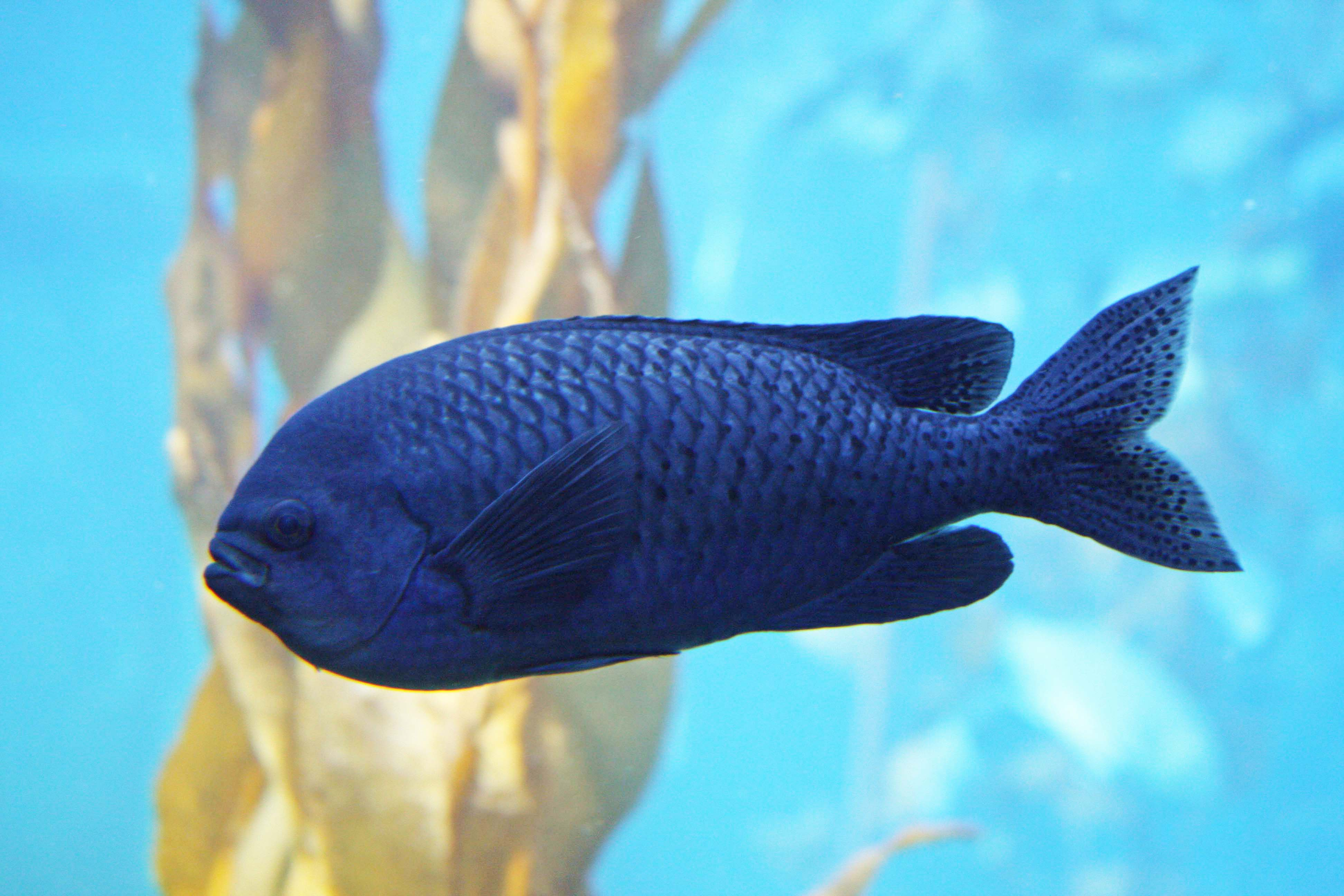
Chromis punctipinnis

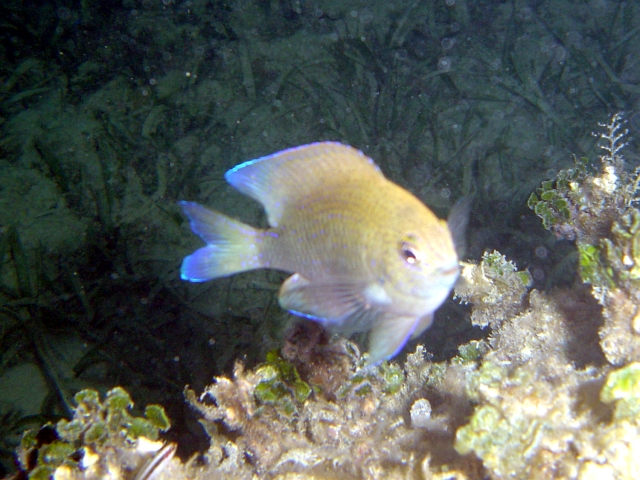
Chromis scotti

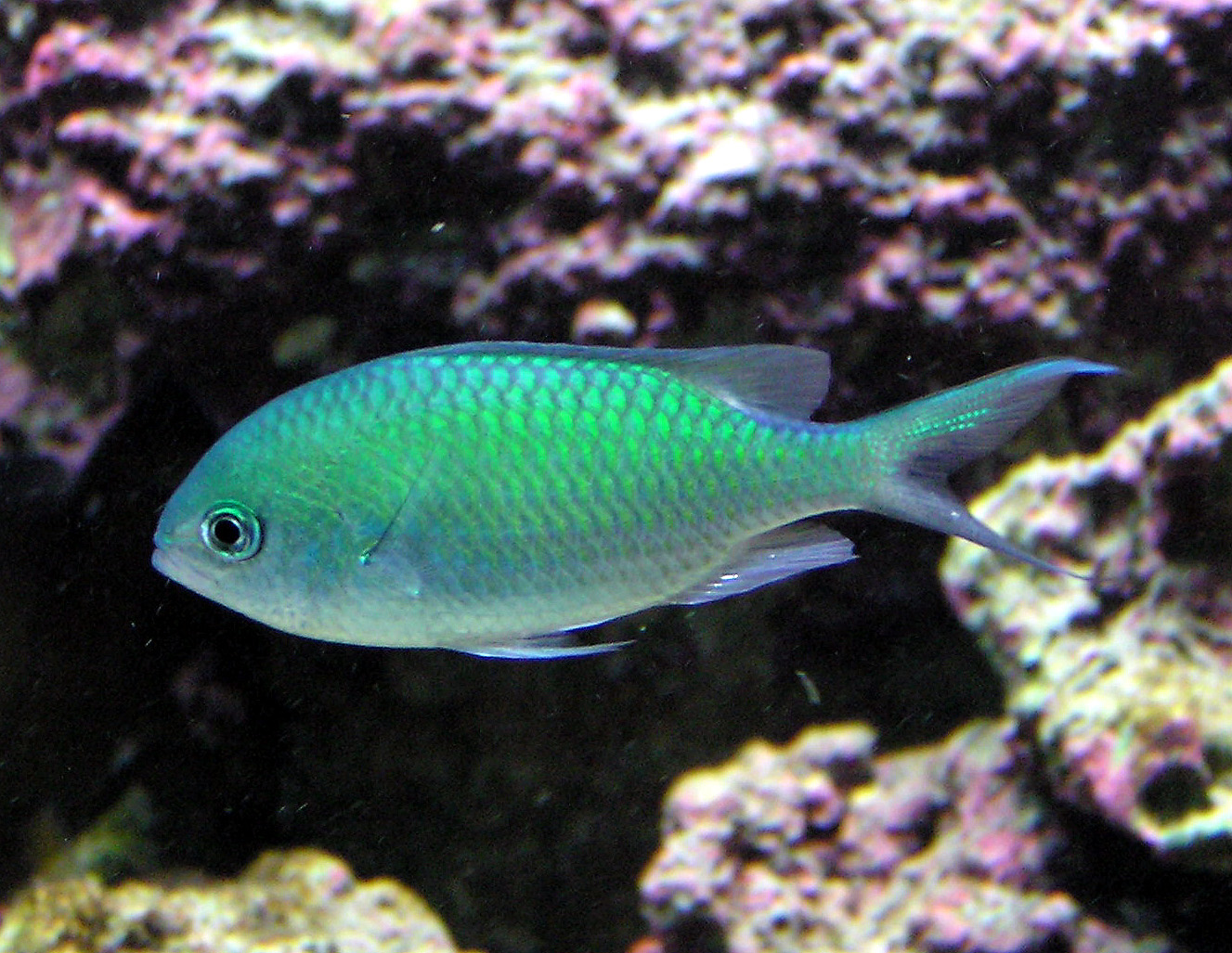
Chromis viridis

These are the currently recognized species in this genus:

- Chromis abadhah Rocha, Pinheiro, Najeeb, Rocha & Shepherd, 2024
- Chromis abyssicola G. R. Allen & J. E. Randall, 1985 (Deepsea chromis)
- Chromis abyssus Pyle, Earle & Greene, 2008 (Deep blue chromis)
- Chromis agilis J. L. B. Smith, 1960 (Agile chromis)
- Chromis albicauda G. R. Allen & Erdmann, 2009 (White-caudal chromis)
- Chromis albomaculata Kamohara, 1960 (White-spotted chromis)
- Chromis alpha J. E. Randall, 1988 (Yellow-speckled chromis)
- Chromis alta D. W. Greenfield & Woods, 1980 (Oval damselfish)
- Chromis anadema Motomura, Nishiyama & Chiba, 2017 (Indigo chromis)
- Chromis analis G. Cuvier, 1830 (Yellow chromis)
- Chromis athena G. R. Allen & Erdmann, 2008
- Chromis atripectoralis Welander & L. P. Schultz, 1951 (Black-axil chromis)
- Chromis axillaris E. T. Bennett, 1831 (Grey chromis)
- Chromis bermudae Nichols, 1920 (Flashing chromis)
- Chromis bowesi Arango, Pinheiro, Rocha, Greene, Pyle, Copus, Shepherd & Rocha, 2019 (Rhomboid Chromis)
- Chromis cadenati Whitley, 1951 (Cadenat's chromis)
- Chromis caerulea Cuvier, 1830 (Blue puller)
- Chromis chromis (Linnaeus, 1758) (Damselfish)
- Chromis chrysura Bliss, 1883 (Stout chromis)
- Chromis cinerascens G. Cuvier, 1830 (Green puller)
- Chromis circumaurea Pyle, Earle & Greene, 2008 (Gold-rim chromis)
- Chromis crusma Valenciennes, 1833 (Valparaiso chromis)
- Chromis cyanea Poey, 1860 (Blue chromis)
- Chromis dasygenys Fowler, 1935 (Blue-spotted chromis)
- Chromis degruyi Pyle, Earle & Greene, 2008 (DeGruy's chromis)
- Chromis dimidiata Klunzinger, 1871 (Chocolatedip chromis)
- Chromis dispilus Griffin, 1923 (Demoiselle)
- Chromis durvillei Quero, Spitz & Vayne, 2010 (Bourbon chromis)
- Chromis earina Pyle, Earle & Greene, 2008 (Spring chromis)
- Chromis enchrysura D. S. Jordan & C. H. Gilbert, 1882 (Yellowtail reeffish)
- Chromis flavapicis J. E. Randall, 2001
- Chromis flavaxilla J. E. Randall, 1994 (Arabian chromis)
- Chromis flavicauda Günther, 1880 (Cobalt chromis)
- Chromis flavomaculata Kamohara, 1960 (Yellow-spotted chromis)
- Chromis fumea S. Tanaka (I), 1917 (Smokey chromis)
- Chromis gunting Arango, Pinheiro, Rocha, Greene, Pyle, Copus, Shepherd & Rocha, 2019 (Dragfish)
- Chromis hangganan Arango, Pinheiro, Rocha, Greene, Pyle, Copus, Shepherd & Rocha, 2019 (Dark Margin Chromis)
- Chromis hypsilepis Günther, 1867 (Brown puller)
- Chromis insolata G. Cuvier, 1830 (Sunshinefish)
- Chromis jubauna R. L. Moura, 1995
- Chromis kennensis Whitley, 1964
- Chromis klunzingeri Whitley, 1929 (Black-headed chromis)
- Chromis limbata Valenciennes, 1830 (Azores chromis)
- Chromis limbaughi D. W. Greenfield & L. P. Woods, 1980 (Limbaugh's damselfish)
- Chromis lubbocki A. J. Edwards, 1986 (Lubbock's chromis)
- Chromis mamatapara Shepherd, Pinheiro, Phelps, Easton, Pérez-Matus & Rocha, 2020
- Chromis mirationis S. Tanaka (I), 1917 (Japanese chromis)
- Chromis monochroma G. R. Allen & J. E. Randall, 2004 (Monochrome chromis)
- Chromis nigroanalis J. E. Randall, 1988 (Kenyan chromis)
- Chromis nitida Whitley, 1928 (Barrier reef chromis)
- Chromis norfolkensis G. R. Allen & M. G. Allen, 2021
- Chromis notata Temminck & Schlegel, 1843 (Pearl-spot chromis)
- Chromis okamurai Yamakawa & J. E. Randall, 1989 (Okinawa chromis)
- Chromis onumai Senou & Kudo, 2007
- Chromis opercularis Günther, 1867 (Doublebar chromis)
- Chromis ovalis Steindachner, 1900 (Hawaiian chromis)
- Chromis pacifica Gerald R. Allen & Mark V. Erdmann, 2020
- Chromis pamae J. E. Randall & J. E. McCosker, 1992
- Chromis pelloura J. E. Randall & G. R. Allen, 1982 (Duskytail chromis)
- Chromis pembae J. L. B. Smith, 1960 (Pemba chromis)
- Chromis planesi Lecchini & J. T. Williams, 2004
- Chromis punctipinnis Cooper, 1863 (Blacksmith)
- Chromis pura G. R. Allen & J. E. Randall, 2004 (Pura chromis)
- Chromis randalli D. W. Greenfield & Hensley, 1970 (Randall's chromis)
- Chromis retrofasciata M. C. W. Weber, 1913 (Black-bar chromis)
- Chromis sahulensis G. R. Allen & M. G. Allen, 2021
- Chromis sanctaehelenae A. J. Edwards, 1987 (St. Helena chromis)
- Chromis scotochiloptera Fowler, 1918 (Philippines chromis)
- Chromis scotti Emery, 1968 (Purple reeffish)
- Chromis norfolkensis G. R. Allen & M. G. Allen, 2021
- Chromis struhsakeri J. E. Randall & Swerdloff, 1973 (Struhsaker's chromis)
- Chromis ternatensis Bleeker, 1856 (Ternate chromis)
- Chromis tingting Tea, Gill & Senou, 2019
- Chromis torquata G. R. Allen, 2018 (Malayan chromis)
- Chromis trialpha G. R. Allen & J. E. Randall, 1980 (Trispot chromis)
- Chromis tweddlei Lisher, Viana & Gon 2024
- Chromis unipa G. R. Allen & Erdmann, 2009 (Unipa chromis)
- Chromis vanbebberae E. P. McFarland, C. Baldwin, D. R. Robertson, L. A. Rocha, L. Tornabene, 2020 (Whitetail reeffish)
- Chromis vanderbilti Fowler, 1941 (Vanderbilt's chromis)
- Chromis veneta M.U. Rekha, 2026
- Chromis verater D. S. Jordan & Metz, 1912 (Threespot chromis)
- Chromis viridis G. Cuvier, 1830 (Blue green damselfish)
- Chromis weberi Fowler & B. A. Bean, 1928 (Weber's chromis)
- Chromis westaustralis G. R. Allen, 1976 (West Australian chromis)
- Chromis woodsi Bruner & Arnam, 1979 (Wood's chromis)
- Chromis xanthochira Bleeker, 1851 (Yellow-axil chromis)
- Chromis xanthopterygia J. E. Randall & McCarthy, 1988 (Yellowfin chromis)
- Chromis xanthura Bleeker, 1854 (Paletail chromis)
- Chromis xouthos G. R. Allen & Erdmann, 2005 (Yellow-brown chromis)
- Chromis xutha J. E. Randall, 1988 (Buff chromis)
- Chromis yamakawai Iwatsubo & Motomura, 2013
