= Chromis brevirostris =

Scientific classification
- Kingdom: Animalia
- Phylum: Chordata
- Class: Actinopterygii
- Order: Blenniiformes
- Family: Pomacentridae
- Genus: Chromis
- Species: C. brevirostris

Binomial name
- Chromis brevirostris Pyle, Earle, and Greene, 2008

Species of fish

Chromis brevirostris, or colloquially known as the shortsnout chromis, is a type of damselfish that was described in 2008 by R. Pyle, J. Earle, and B. Greene in the western Pacific Ocean. This species comes from the genus Chromis which contains eighty species and counting, including C. abyssus, C. circumaurea, C. degruyi, and C. earina. Chromis brevirostris can be found in the Pacific Ocean, located as far north as the Marshall Islands to as far south as Fiji and Vanuatu, and spanning from Palau to Paluwat of the Caroline Islands. The species’ name, Chromis brevirostris, derives from Latin origin; brevis and rostrum mean “short” and “snout” respectively. It is generally abundant in its environment, living at depths of 90–120 metres (300–390 ft), tending to live in groups ranging in size from six to several dozen.

== Description ==
The fish is around 6 centimetres (2.4 in) long, 1.5 cm (0.6 in) deep and are pale lavender-tinged grey in colour. Like other species of the genus Chromis, C. brevirostris has bright, colourful scales, as well as bright and colourful tail, dorsal, anal, and ventral fins. Adults of this species are pale lavender and grey in colour on the dorsal side, blue to white on the thorax, blue to grey on the ventral side. They also have golden scales and golden tails and fins. On the outer edges, the scales are golden yellow, but then gradually change to blue and gray as moved from outer to inner edges. Along with colour, the Chromis brevirostris can be distinguished from other Chromis species by its smooth and convex-shaped head, and the number of soft ray fins. Chromis brevirostris typically have 15–16 anal, 13–14 dorsal, 18–19 pectoral, and 2–3 spiniform caudal soft ray fins. Furthermore, they also have 14–16 lateral-line scales and 26–29 gill rakers. Their irises are golden in colour.

== Location ==
Found in the mesophotic zone of the western Pacific Ocean typically at drop-offs, steep slopes and corals, Chromis brevirostris grow in communities of large abundance at depths of 90–120 metres. This depth is the lowest that they can thrive in. Although Chromis brevirostris was first observed at a depth of 100–103 metres deep around the Caroline Islands, dispersal has since resulted in a change in species distribution to depths as high as 60 metres and across the Pacific Ocean near Bali, Melanesia, and Micronesia in swarms of approximately one dozen individual Shortsnout Chromis.

== Diet and foraging ==
The shortsnout chromis are deep water specialists. This means that because of high biodiversity in their habitat, this species is able to forage on a specific diet. The shortsnout chromis feed almost exclusively, if not entirely, on zooplankton that can be found floating in water columns.

== Etymology ==
The name of this species was derived from the Latin words brevis (meaning "short") and rostrum (meaning "beak" or "snout"). This is in reference to the very short snout of this species relative to other species in the genus Chromis.
