= Chromis degruyi =

Scientific classification
- Kingdom: Animalia
- Phylum: Chordata
- Class: Actinopterygii
- Order: Blenniiformes
- Family: Pomacentridae
- Genus: Chromis
- Species: C. degruyi

Binomial name
- Chromis degruyi Pyle, Earle & Greene, 2008

Species of fish

Chromis degruyi is a species of fish in the family Pomacentridae. It was first found at depths greater than 60 metres (200 ft) in a coral reef habitat in the western Pacific, specifically the Caroline Islands. It differs from its cogenerates on a colour and morphological basis.
