= Chromis abyssus =

Scientific classification
- Kingdom: Animalia
- Phylum: Chordata
- Class: Actinopterygii
- Order: Blenniiformes
- Family: Pomacentridae
- Genus: Chromis
- Species: C. abyssus

Binomial name
- Chromis abyssus Pyle, 2008

Species of fish

Chromis abyssus is a species of damselfish first discovered in 1997 and described in 2008. The 8 centimetres (3.1 in) long fish only lives more than 110 m (361 ft) below the surface of the Pacific Ocean around the coast of the Ngemelis Islands, Palau. Adults have been observed living singly or in pairs, whereas juveniles tend to live in groups.

== Etymology ==
Its specific name, abyssus, is a Latinised form of the Greek noun abyssos (meaning "abyss"), in honour of the documentary film Pacific Abyss, produced by the British Broadcasting Corporation, which funded the expedition on which the type specimens were collected. The vernacular name "deep blue Chromis", a reference to both the life colour of this species and the relatively (within the context of the genus) deep-dwelling habits, is suggested instead of the more literally translated "abyss Chromis", so as not to imply that the species inhabits depths commonly defined as abyssal.

== ZooBank ==
C. abyssus was the first species entered into the ZooBank registry with a timestamp of 2008-01-01T00:00:02, and it was selected as one of "The Top 10 New Species" described in 2008 by The International Institute for Species Exploration at Arizona State University and an international committee of taxonomists.
