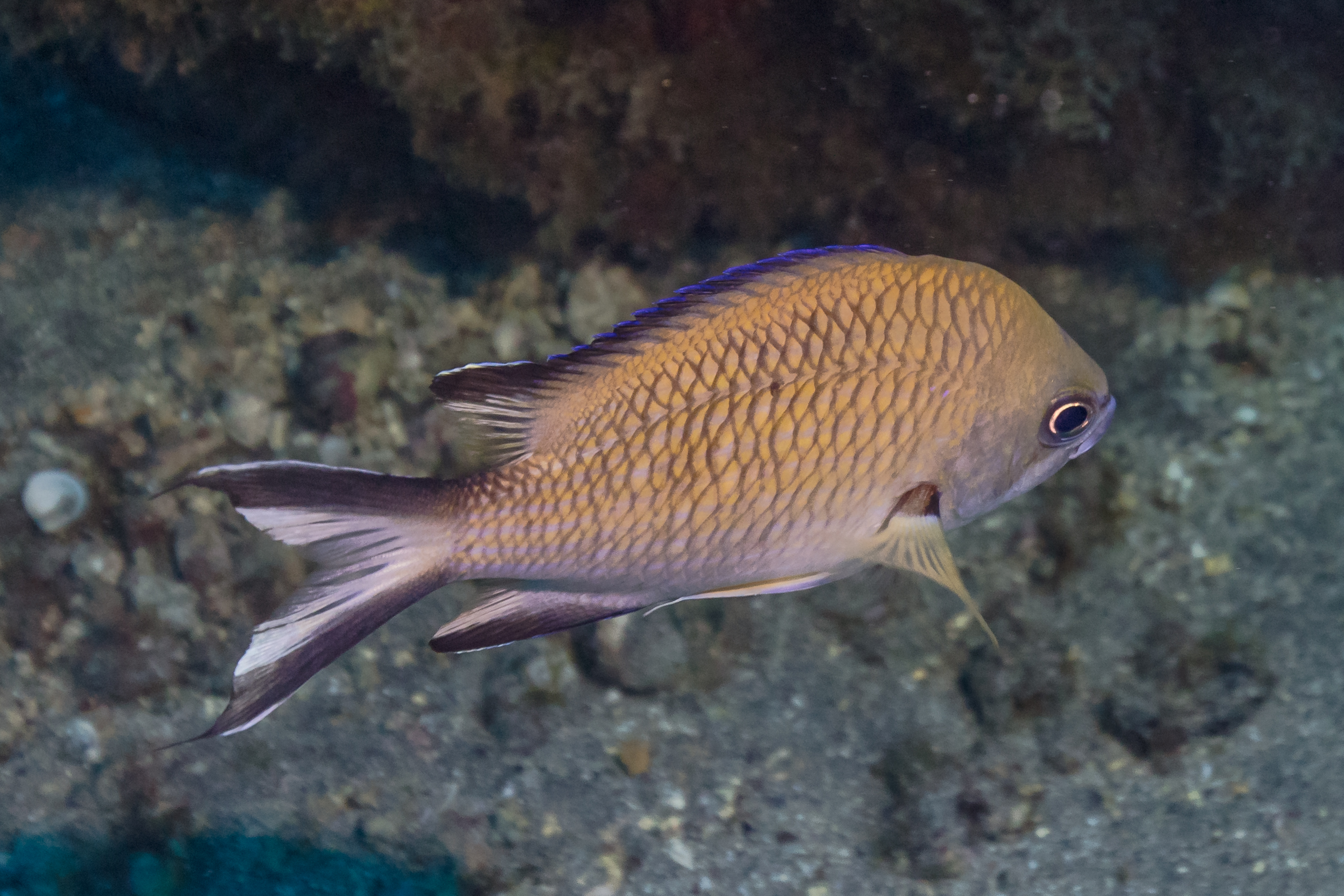

Conservation status
- Least Concern (IUCN 3.1)

Scientific classification
- Kingdom: Animalia
- Phylum: Chordata
- Class: Actinopterygii
- Order: Blenniiformes
- Family: Pomacentridae
- Genus: Azurina
- Species: C. limbata

Binomial name
- Chromis limbata (Valenciennes, 1833)

Synonyms
- Heliases limbatus Valenciennes, 1833; Heliazes marginatus Valenciennes, 1843

= Chromis limbata =

Species of fish

The Azores chromis or Atlantic chromis (Chromis limbata) is a species of damselfish from the family Pomacentridae which is found in the Macaronesian Islands of the temperate eastern Atlantic Ocean and has been reported from coastal regions of western Africa.

== Description ==
Chromis limbata is greyish-brown in colour with a dark dorsal fin, anal fin and distal margin of the caudal fin, with its proximate part being whitish. When spawning, the male develops a slightly purple hue as its courtship colours. It has a large eye and a strongly protractile mouth which reaches the vertical from eye. There are three rows of small canine-like teeth on the jaws. The dorsal fin has 14 spines and 11-12 soft rays while the anal fin has 2 spines and 10-12 soft rays. It grows to 12 cm (4.7 in) standard length.

== Distribution ==
Chromis limbata occurs in the Azores and Madeira which are part of Portugal and in the Canary Islands, Spain. It has also been reported off the coast of western Africa from Senegal to Pointe Noire, Congo. It is apparently replaced in the Cape Verde Islands by the endemic Lubbock's chromis (Chromis lubbocki). Small numbers of C. limbata have been recorded off islands in Santa Catarina in southern Brazil and these may be vagrants or may have been introduced through discharge of ships' ballast water.

== Biology ==
The adults of Chromis limbata occur in rocky reefs and sandy-weedy areas, with a depth range of 5–45 metres (16–148 ft). They are oviparous and form pairs to breed, the male clears a space on the substrate for the female to lay the eggs in, the eggs adhere to the substrate and the male guards and aerates them. It is commonest between depths of 5 to 50 m (16 to 164 ft). It can either be found close to the sea bed or it forms pelagic schools. It feeds on small benthic or planktonic invertebrates.

== Taxonomy ==
It was formerly considered conspecific with Chromis chromis but in some areas the two species are sympatric.

== Uses ==
Chromis limbata is a valued food fish in Madeira and is subject to a small scale artisanal fishery, especially off the south and east of the island.
