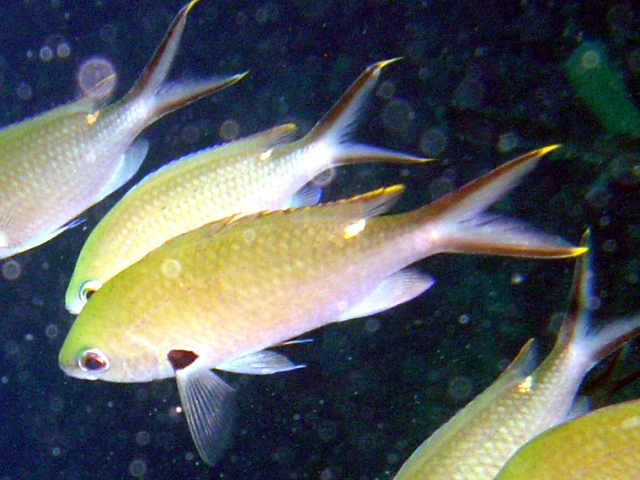

Conservation status
- Least Concern (IUCN 3.1)

Scientific classification
- Kingdom: Animalia
- Phylum: Chordata
- Class: Actinopterygii
- Order: Blenniiformes
- Family: Pomacentridae
- Genus: Chromis
- Species: C. multilineata

Binomial name
- Chromis multilineata (Guichenot, 1853)

Synonyms
- Chromis marginata (Castelnau, 1855); Furcaria puncta Poey, 1860; Onychognathus cautus Troschel, 1866; Chromis cautus (Troschel, 1866); Heliastes marginatus Günther, 1869

= Chromis multilineata =

Species of fish

Chromis multilineata is a species of fish in the family Pomacentridae. It is commonly known as the brown chromis. It is found in the western Atlantic Ocean from the southern United States south to Brazil and in the eastern Atlantic off St Helena and Ascension Island
