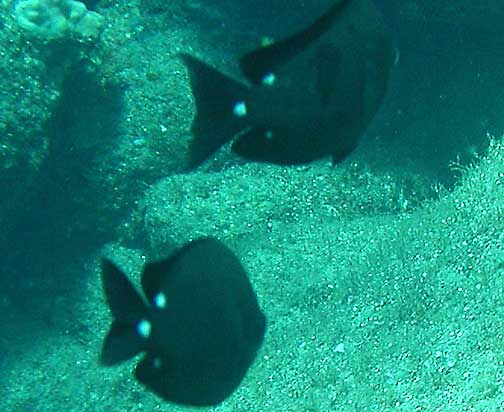

Conservation status
- Least Concern (IUCN 3.1)

Scientific classification
- Kingdom: Animalia
- Phylum: Chordata
- Class: Actinopterygii
- Order: Blenniiformes
- Family: Pomacentridae
- Genus: Chromis
- Species: C. verater

Binomial name
- Chromis verater Jordan & Metz, 1912

= Chromis verater =

Species of fish

Chromis verater, commonly known as threespot chromis, is a species of damselfish endemic to Hawaii. The species is planktivorous.

== Description ==
The threespot chromis is usually dark gray or black with three white spots: one above, one below, and one on the bottom of the tail. Specifically, the three white spots are located on the rear base of the dorsal fin, the rear base of the anal fin, and at the mid-base of the caudal fin. This species is able to lighten or darken its spots which could also disappear. This species has a lower body condition and weight-at-length in mesophotic sites compared to shallow reef sites. However, at times it can turn almost entirely silver-gray. During spawning season, the male species tend to lighten their bodies while their fins are dark, resembling a pattern of Hawaiian Dascyllus.

== Distribution and habitat ==
You can see the threespot chromis at almost any beach on the island. These species tend to live in rocky bottom areas around caves with a depth between 20 and 500 feet but are usually seen at slightly over 100 feet. The species' behavior determines their habitat preference. To care for these fishes, they should be given wide-open swimming areas. The threespot chromis is locally common along ledges where they're exposed to the current where it feeds on zooplankton.

== Human use ==
The threespot chromis can be displayed in a commercial aquarium. To care for these fishes, they should be given wide-open swimming areas. If in an aquarium, provide caves and ledges for shelter, this species probably prefers a low-lit aquarium.
