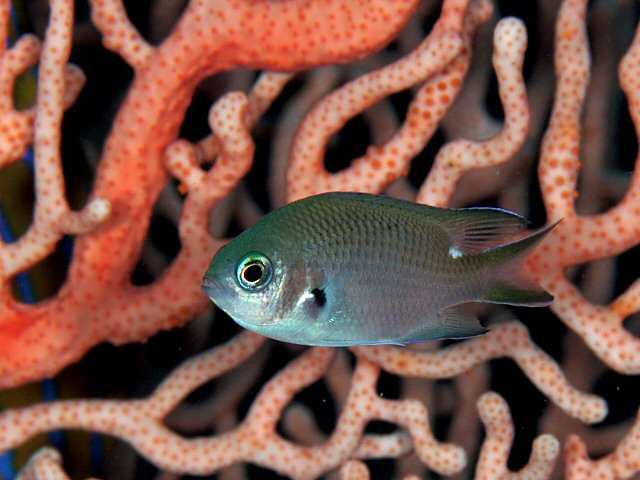

Conservation status
- Least Concern (IUCN 3.1)

Scientific classification
- Kingdom: Animalia
- Phylum: Chordata
- Class: Actinopterygii
- Division: Teleostei
- Order: Blenniiformes
- Family: Pomacentridae
- Genus: Chromis
- Species: C. notata

Binomial name
- Chromis notata (Temminck & Schlegel, 1843)

Synonyms
- Heliases notatus Temminck & Schlegel, 1843; Chromis notatus (Temminck & Schlegel, 1843); Chromis villadolidi Jordan & Tanaka, 1927; Chromis miyakeensis Moyer & Ida, 1976

= Chromis notata =

Pearl-spot chromis

Species of fish

The pearl-spot chromis or spottedfin puller (Chromis notata), also known as jaridom, is a damselfish of the family Pomacentridae, found in the northwest Pacific from southern Korea, the coast of Jeju Island, southern Japan, the Ryukyu Islands, Taiwan, and China, at depths of between 2 and 15 m. Its length is up to 17 cm.
