= Chromis struhsakeri =

Scientific classification
- Kingdom: Animalia
- Phylum: Chordata
- Class: Actinopterygii
- Order: Blenniiformes
- Family: Pomacentridae
- Genus: Chromis
- Species: C. struhsakeri

Binomial name
- Chromis struhsakeri J. E. Randall & Swerdloff, 1973

Species of fish

Chromis struhsakeri, also known as Struhsaker's chromis, is a species of damselfish, in the family Pomacentridae.

== Distribution ==
Chromis struhsakeri is endemic to the Hawaiian Islands.
