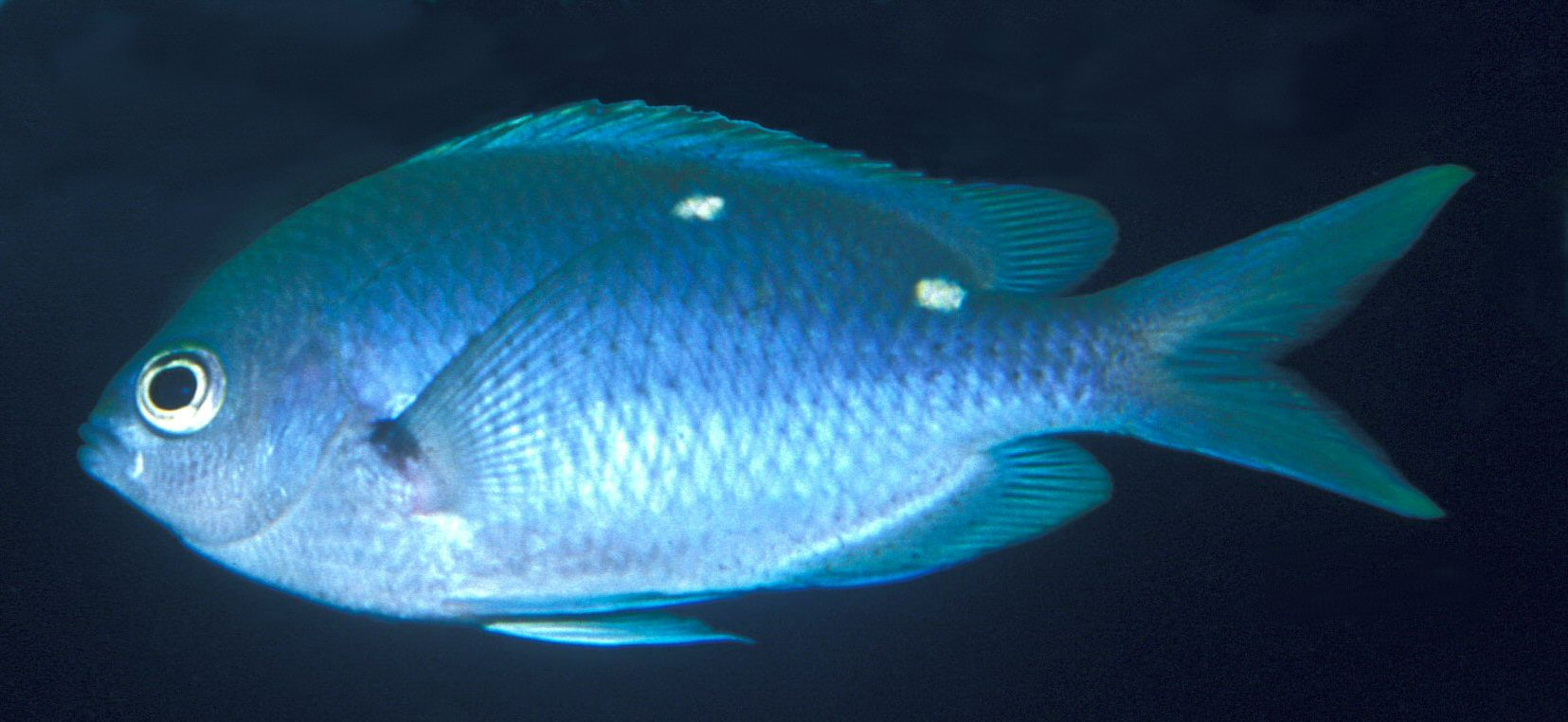

Conservation status
- Least Concern (IUCN 3.1)

Scientific classification
- Kingdom: Animalia
- Phylum: Chordata
- Class: Actinopterygii
- Division: Teleostei
- Order: Blenniiformes
- Family: Pomacentridae
- Genus: Chromis
- Species: C. dispilus

Binomial name
- Chromis dispilus Griffin, 1923

= New Zealand demoiselle =

Species of fish

The New Zealand demoiselle (Chromis dispilus) is a damselfish of the genus Chromis, found between North Cape and East Cape of the North Island of New Zealand to depths of about 60 metres, off rocky coasts. Its length is between 15 and 20 cm. Males are highly territorial as they defend their nesting area from other males and other species. These aggressive fish defend their eggs laid by their female counterpart. Spawning occurs between the months of December and March. The New Zealand demoiselle's territory and nesting grounds of this fish are usually the largest in a medium population density. Like most territorial fish they tend to spawn more in higher densities of the same species compared to lower densities. Aggression levels tend to be higher amount higher densities of the same species and lower levels in smaller densities. Aggression also tends to be higher during spawning then during egg defending. Elevated plasma levels of androgen testosterone and 11-Ketotesterone are associated with the heighten levels of aggression shown by the males.
