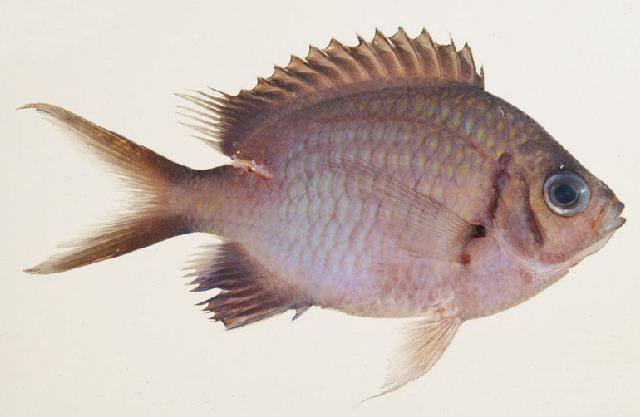

Conservation status
- Least Concern (IUCN 3.1)

Scientific classification
- Domain: Eukaryota
- Kingdom: Animalia
- Phylum: Chordata
- Class: Actinopterygii
- Order: Blenniiformes
- Family: Pomacentridae
- Genus: Chromis
- Species: C. alpha

Binomial name
- Chromis alpha (J. E. Randall, 1988)

= Chromis alpha =

Species of Fish

Chromis alpha, the yellow-speckled chromis, is a diurnal species of damselfish belonging to the genus Chromis. It can be found in the Indo-Pacific region from Christmas Island to the Society Islands, north to the Mariana Islands, south to New Caledonia, through Micronesia. It inhabits clear lagoons and seaward reefs appearing singly or in loose aggregations near caves or ledges. It is commonly found over branching corals and leeward coasts, and it feeds on plankton. It is oviparous, and the males of the species guard and aerate the eggs.
