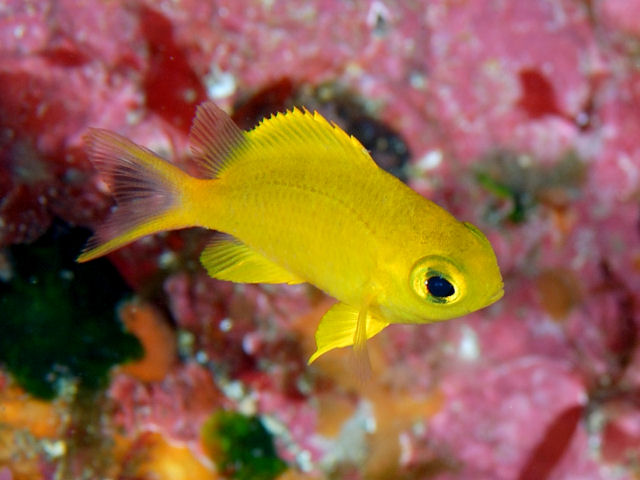

Conservation status
- Least Concern (IUCN 3.1)

Scientific classification
- Kingdom: Animalia
- Phylum: Chordata
- Class: Actinopterygii
- Order: Blenniiformes
- Family: Pomacentridae
- Genus: Azurina
- Species: C. albicauda

Binomial name
- Chromis albicauda (G. R. Allen & Ermann, 2009)

= Chromis albicauda =

Species of fish

Chromis albicauda, the white-caudal chromis, is a species of damselfish belonging to the genus Chromis. It can be found in the Western Pacific Ocean along the northern and western shores of Nusa Penida, Indonesia and the southern Japanese seas. It inhabits areas of cool upwelling. It typically forms aggregations, feeding high in the water column on zooplankton when currents are strong. It is oviparous, and the males of the species guard and aerate the eggs.
