= Chromis sanctaehelenae =

Conservation status
- Least Concern (IUCN 3.1)

Scientific classification
- Kingdom: Animalia
- Phylum: Chordata
- Class: Actinopterygii
- Order: Blenniiformes
- Family: Pomacentridae
- Genus: Chromis
- Species: C. sanctaehelenae

Binomial name
- Chromis sanctaehelenae A. J. Edwards, 1987

Species of fish

Chromis sanctaehelenae is a species of fish, in the family Pomacentridae.

== Habitat ==
It is endemic to Saint Helena.

The adults occur in rocky or rubble reefs.

== Behaviour ==
They are oviparous, and they form pairs during spawning.

The eggs are demersal, adhering to the substrate, and are guarded and aerated by the male.
