= Indigo chromis =

Scientific classification
- Kingdom: Animalia
- Phylum: Chordata
- Class: Actinopterygii
- Order: Blenniiformes
- Family: Pomacentridae
- Genus: Chromis
- Species: C. anadema

Binomial name
- Chromis anadema Motomura, Nishiyama & Chiba, 2017

Species of fish

The indigo chromis (Chromis anadema), is a species of damselfish native to the Pacific Ocean, with occurrences in the Ryukyu Islands, southern Japan, Palau to the islands in the Polynesian region (Marquesas, Society, Gambier and Pitcairn Islands). It is a species that lives in small schools close to coral walls in deep-waters.
