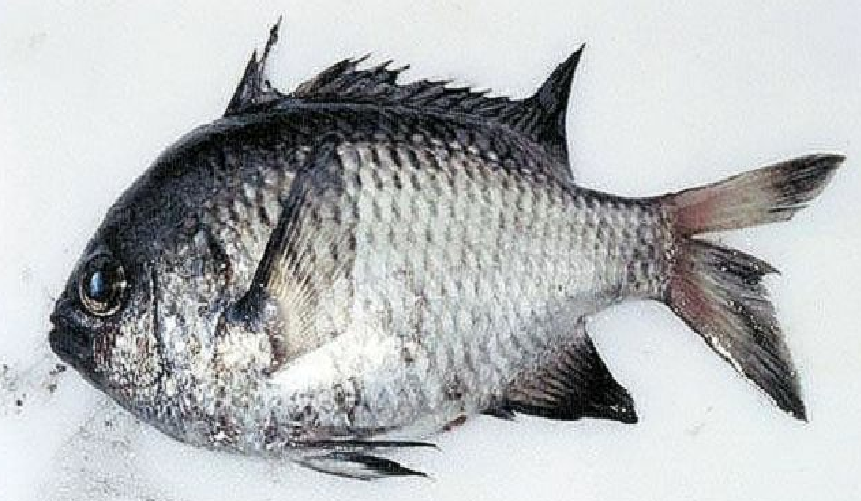

Conservation status
- Least Concern (IUCN 3.1)

Scientific classification
- Domain: Eukaryota
- Kingdom: Animalia
- Phylum: Chordata
- Class: Actinopterygii
- Order: Blenniiformes
- Family: Pomacentridae
- Genus: Chromis
- Species: C. crusma

Binomial name
- Chromis crusma (Valenciennes, 1833)

Synonyms
- Heliases crusma Valenciennes, 1833; Chromis cupreus Fowler & Bean, 1923

= Chromis crusma =

Species of damselfish

Chromis crusma, the Valparaiso chromis, is a species of damselfish belonging to the genus Chromis. It can be found in the South-Eastern Pacific Ocean, from Cabo Blanco, Peru to Talcahuano, Chile. It is oviparous, and the males of the species guard and aerate the eggs.
