= Chromis limbaughi =

Conservation status
- Least Concern (IUCN 3.1)

Scientific classification
- Kingdom: Animalia
- Phylum: Chordata
- Class: Actinopterygii
- Division: Teleostei
- Order: Blenniiformes
- Family: Pomacentridae
- Genus: Chromis
- Species: C. limbaughi

Binomial name
- Chromis limbaughi Greenfield & Woods, 1980

Species of fish

Chromis limbaughi is a small species of ray-finned fish, often called the blue and yellow damselfish or Limbaugh's damselfish. It belongs to the family Pomacentridae, encompassing the clownfish and damselfish, and is a member of the Chromis genus. It is bright blue near the head and gradually fades to a bright yellow near the dorsal and caudal regions. C. limbaughi aggregate during the day, forming relatively small schools swimming close to the bottom of the reef, feeding on zooplankton. The blue and yellow damselfish was first identified by photographer Conrad Limbaugh, who captured two specimens in 1953 and took the first photographs of this species.

== Species description ==
Limbaugh's damselfish is deep-bodied, being deeper from its dorsal to its ventral region than it is wide. These fish typically exhibit 13 dorsal spines followed by 11-12 dorsal fin rays, 18-19 pectoral fin rays, and dorsal lateral fin lines with 15-18 tubed scales. Distinctive dark spots are present on the upper portion of the pectoral fin base. C. limbaughi can be distinguished from other members of its genus, C. atrilobata and C. intercrusma, by the presence of 13 dorsal fin spines; from C. punctipinnis by its deeper body; from C. crusma by its fewer tubed lateral line scales; from C. meridiana by three exposed spiniform procurrent caudal fin rays and 13 dorsal fin rays, and from C. alta by soft anal fin rays and by a distinct dark spot in the upper portion of the pectoral fin base that is absent in C. alta. Its jaw teeth are conical and moderately spaced out with a terminal mouth position. These fish use their forward-facing mouths to scrape algae from rock surfaces and catch zooplankton in the water column. The blue and yellow damsel fish, as the name implies, has a dark blue body with a lighter neon blue snout, although juveniles are more vibrant. The color gradually transitions from a deep blue to yellow along the dorsal and caudal regions of the body. The holotype specimen was discovered and recorded in Baja California, Mexico, at Cabo San Lucas on June 14, 1961.

== Systematics ==
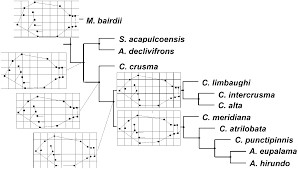
Morphometric phylogeny of Chromis-Azurina species of the eastern Pacific.

Despite multiple molecular data, the phylogenetic relationships among Pomacentridae remain a mystery. Researchers have used patterns in cephalic and pectoral fin morphology to determine possible relationships within Chromis and other members within Pomacentridae, finding Azurina as a sister species to Chromis. The Eastern Pacific is home to a variety of Chromis species. The monophyly of Chromis indicates that a deep-bodied form characterizes the basal morphology of the genus. C. limbaughi, as a deep-bodied species, is grouped with others with the same morphology: C. intercrusma and C. alta.

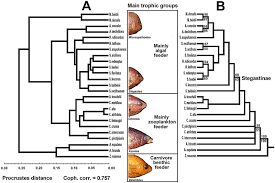
Comparison of two hierarchical models. Phenogram (A) and morphometric phylogeny (B) compared to main trophic groups of damselfish.

The other group of damselfish are classified as slender-bodied species, with significant differences between the two, such as snout position relative to the eye, the operculum's superior region, the insertion angle of the pectoral fin, and the inclination of the ventral region. C. limbaughi and C. alta are known allopatric species; C. limbaughi in Baja California and C. alta from the Galapagos Islands, suggesting an already close relationship between the two. Both C. limbaughi and C. alta also share similar morphology in their wide, powerful pectoral fins, which facilitate precise movements along their reef bottom niche.

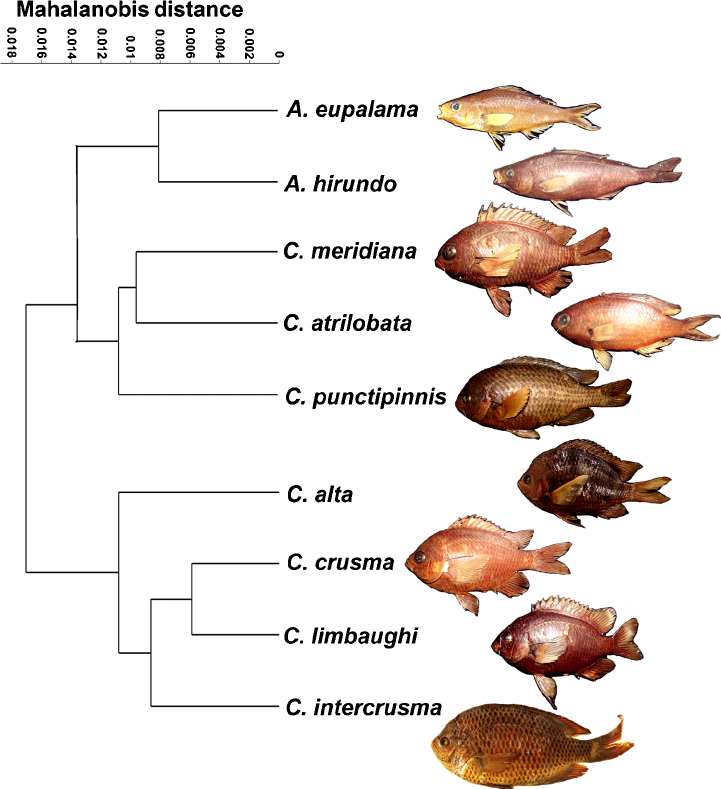
UPGMA phenogram of morphological data, using Mahalanobis distance.

While phenotypic characters may not provide complete accuracy in systematics, Studies combining morphometric and molecular data to answer phylogenetic hypotheses demonstrate high consistency, suggesting morphometric data contain a significant amount of phylogenetic information. Phenograms describing possible phenotypic relationships place C. limbaughi as a sister species to C. crusma. Both C. limbaughi and crusma share a common ancestor with C. intercrusma, with C. alta being the most ancestral of the deep-bodied fish.

However, morphometric phylogenetic analysis places C. limbaughi as the closest relative to sister species C. alta and C. intercrusma, with C. crusma as the more basal of the deep-bodied species. The analysis suggests morphological divergence in Chromis corresponds to a time of ecological separation between reef partitioning, bottom reef, and midwater reef environments. Despite these findings, definitive classifications among deep-bodied chromis species remain inconclusive, necessitating further molecular analyses to place C. limbaughi within its genus accurately.

== Habitat and distribution ==
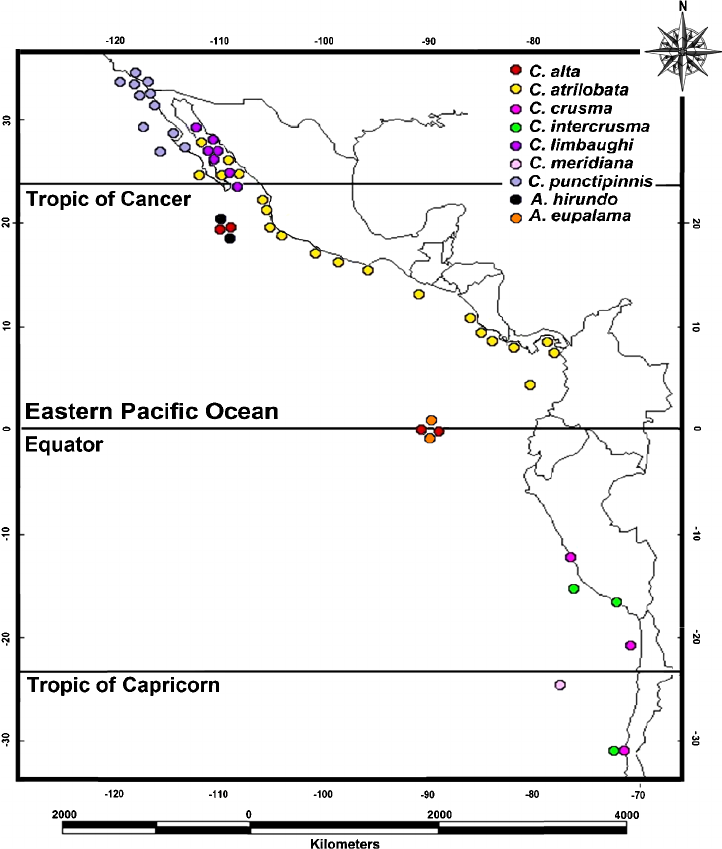
Distribution of Chromis and Azurina along the coasts and islands of the eastern Pacific.

Blue and yellow damselfish are small fish found among rocky and coral reef systems around the Gulf of California and as far south as Banderas Bay, Mexico.

These fish aggregate in schools above the rocky bottom, feeding on zooplankton and other fish eggs. Records initially identified its northernmost range of 29° N and -113.5° W; however, new records have placed it 140 km to the north of its original range and 170 km to the east. Juvenile blue and yellow damselfish have been reported in areas north of 29° N, suggesting established reproductive populations. Since these reports were absent before, it suggests their arrival in northern waters has been relatively recent. Morphology can reflect ecological and behavioral patterns. Deep-bodied C. limbaughi and others of the same classification occupy niches along the bottom to midwater. Their deep-bodied characteristics facilitate prey detection and capture close to the reef bottom. The depth distribution of C. limbaughi varies greatly with latitude; in Los Angeles Bay (28° N), it occurs in shallower waters, while it lives in deeper water in the southern Gulf of California. Additionally, C. limbaughi has not been detected in the tropics south of Banderas Bay (20° N), suggesting it prefers relatively cooler waters. C. limbaughi shares its habitat with other members of Pomacentridae, Scaridae, Serranidae, Ostraciidea, Lutjanidae, and Muraenidae.

== Life history ==
Blue and yellow damselfish are gonochoristic species; they're either male or female throughout their life and lack sexual dimorphism. Additionally, they also display promiscuous behavior, a common trait among gonochoristic species. While most other Chromis species engage in haremic behavior with a greater female to male ratio in the wild, C. limbaughi sex ratios were closer to 1:1 and did not form harems; Rather, this species engages in polygamy, mating with multiple males and females. Other damselfish males exhibit highly territorial and aggressive behavior; however, blue and yellow damselfish are atypically mild-mannered, making them an attractive choice for aquarists. C. limbaughi experiences reproductive peaks during spring and summer, May through September. Male size at sexual maturity is 7.90 cm, and females reach 7.59 cm. Once mates have been established, males are tasked with cleaning the nest site for benthic oviposition. Male damselfish partake in nest defensive behavior, and studies have demonstrated liver nutritional reserves are depleted during this time, as feeding activity may be reduced up to 85% in other members of the Pomacentridae family. Additionally, male parental care has been documented by frequent pectoral fanning over the eggs, which provides fresh oxygenated water to the developing embryos. Relative to pelagic (buoyant), demersal (seafloor) eggs laid by blue and yellow damselfish are larger but have a shorter incubation period and produce altricial young. These young depend on stored lipids in yolk sacs, which eases their dependence on solid food for a short time.

== Conservation status ==
The species is considered 'Least Concern' by the I.U.C.N. Red List because it is not used for consumption, is relatively available, and has no reported reduced population. Despite this, the Mexican government has classified the species as 'special protection, since the species is one of the three most important fish in the aquarium trade since the 1970s. Fishing permits are routinely offered for C. limbaughi and other species for small fishing cooperatives in the Gulf of California. Unfortunately, hard data on fish catches are unknown because keeping and reporting among fisheries are nonexistent or not enforced, suggesting a possible increase in overexploitation and or illegal fishing of the species. However, recorded captures include C. limbaughi as one of the five most captured fish in Mexican waters. The aquarium trade is perhaps its greatest threat, as all available blue and yellow damselfish are wild-caught juveniles due to their vibrant coloration, and have not been bred in captivity, suggesting the recruitment rate of fish to reproductive age is directly impacted. Many marine species like A. polycanthus have been successfully spawned in captivity, but C. limbaughi has never been bred. Therefore, breeding should be attempted to ease potential strain on wild-caught populations.
