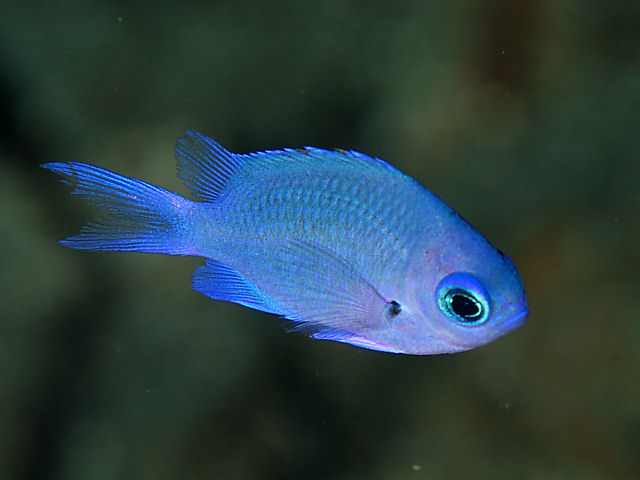

Conservation status
- Least Concern (IUCN 3.1)

Scientific classification
- Kingdom: Animalia
- Phylum: Chordata
- Class: Actinopterygii
- Order: Blenniiformes
- Family: Pomacentridae
- Genus: Chromis
- Species: C. albomaculata

Binomial name
- Chromis albomaculata (Kamohara, 1960)

= Chromis albomaculata =

Species of fish

Chromis albomaculata, known by its common name as the white-spotted chromis, is a diurnal species of damselfish belonging to the genus Chromis. It can be found in the North Western Pacific Ocean in the Izu Islands, Okinawa Island, the Ogasawara Islands and in Taiwan. It inhabits steep slopes and rocky bottoms on offshore reefs. It is oviparous, and the males of the species guard and aerate the eggs.
