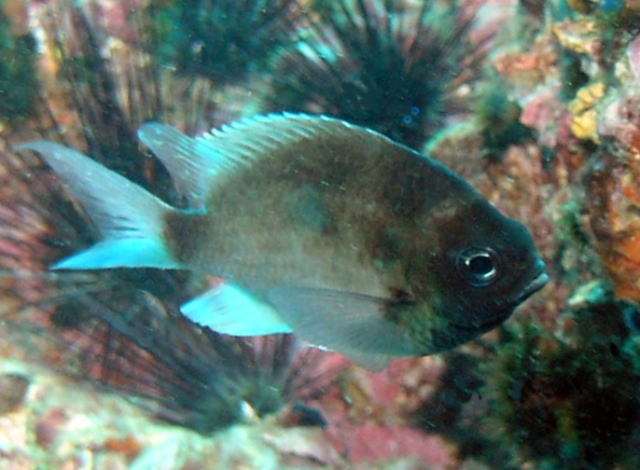

Conservation status
- Least Concern (IUCN 3.1)

Scientific classification
- Domain: Eukaryota
- Kingdom: Animalia
- Phylum: Chordata
- Class: Actinopterygii
- Order: Blenniiformes
- Family: Pomacentridae
- Genus: Chromis
- Species: C. cinerascens

Binomial name
- Chromis cinerascens (Cuvier, 1830)

Synonyms
- Heliases cinerascens Cuvier, 1830; Glyphisodon angulatus Bleeker, 1845 Chromis insulindicus Bleeker, 1877; Glyphisodon javanicus van Hasselt, 1877

= Chromis cinerascens =

Species of fish

Chromis cinerascens, the green puller, is a diurnal species of damselfish belonging to the genus Chromis. It can be found in the Indo-West Pacific region, in Sri Lanka, Maldives, the Andaman Sea, Malaysia, Indonesia, Vietnam, the Philippines, East Timor, Brunei Darussalam, North-western Australia, Hong Kong and Taiwan. It inhabits coral reefs. It is oviparous, and the males of the species guard and aerate the eggs.
