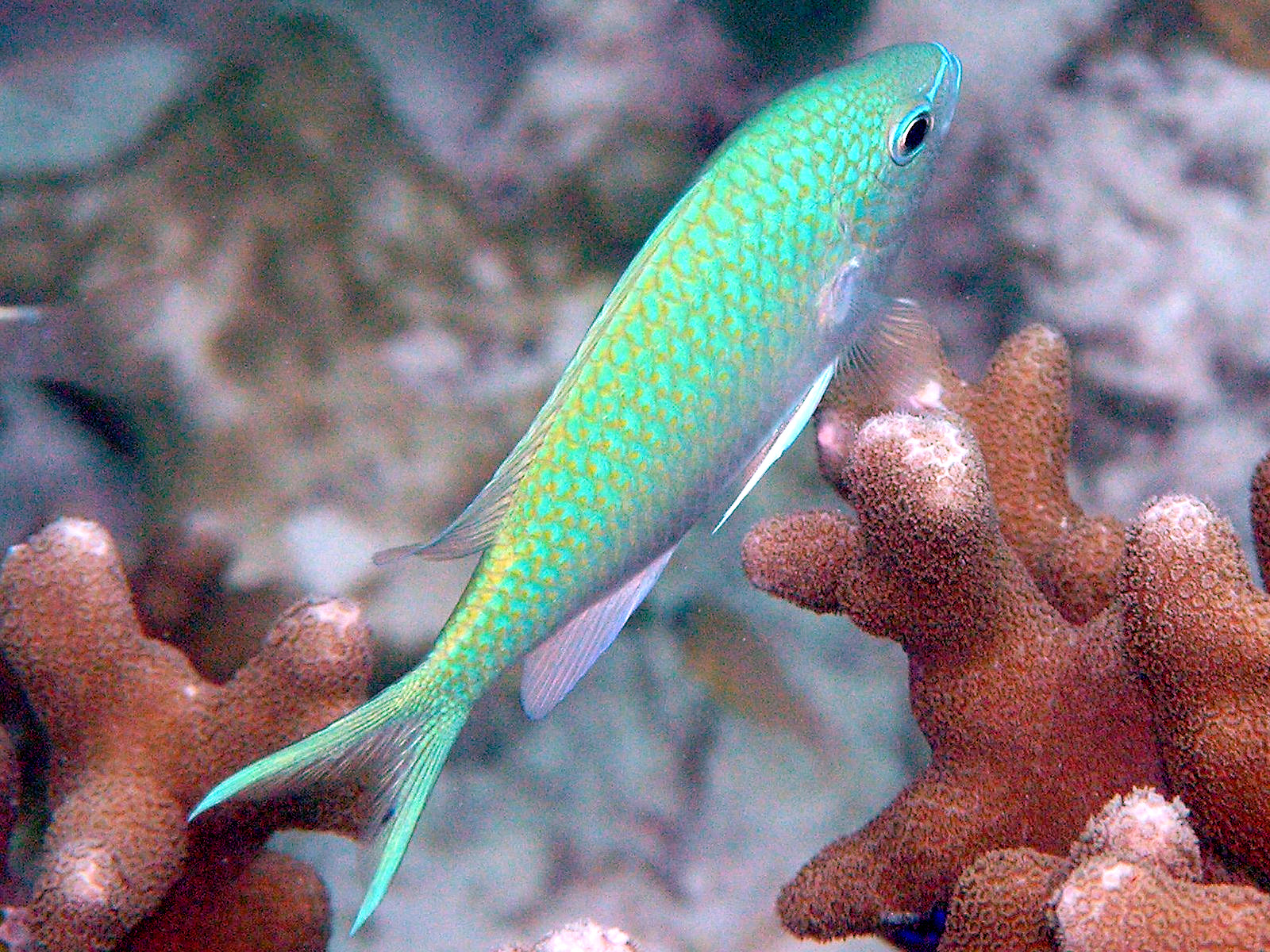

Conservation status
- Least Concern (IUCN 3.1)

Scientific classification
- Kingdom: Animalia
- Phylum: Chordata
- Class: Actinopterygii
- Order: Blenniiformes
- Family: Pomacentridae
- Genus: Chromis
- Species: C. atripectoralis

Binomial name
- Chromis atripectoralis Welander & Schultz, 1951

= Chromis atripectoralis =

Species of fish

The black-axil chromis (Chromis atripectoralis), also known as the blackfin chromis or blue-green puller, is a damselfish from the tropical Indo-Pacific. This fish can reach almost 12 centimetres (4.7 in) in length. It inhabits lagoons and reefs after settlement in the late-larval stage, and often occurs in large numbers, feeding above Acropora corals. This fish mostly feeds upon copepods, amphipods, and zoea.

This fish is often confused with its sibling species Chromis viridis.

== Morphology ==
C. atripectoralis is a blue-green damselfish that grows to a maximum length of twelve centimeters. The head and dorsal side of the fish is blue-green, while the belly is white to white-gray. C. atripectoralis has both an inner and an outer row of conical, widely spaced teeth.

C. atripectoralis is the sibling species of the blue-green damselfish C. viridis based on their mitochondrial genome. C. atripectoralis is often confused with C. viridis because the two species have a similar body shape and blue-green coloration. The two species can be differentiated by the color pattern of their fins. The pectoral fin axil of C. atripectoralis is black, whereas the upper base of the pectoral fin of C. viridis appears dusky due to the presence of black dots. Additionally, the two sibling species have different, but overlapping, numbers of pectoral rays. C. atripectoralis has 18-20 pectoral rays, while C. viridis has 17-19.

== Habitat ==
The range of C. atripectoralis spans the Indian and south Pacific Oceans from the east African coasts to French Polynesia, and the damselfish can also be found as far north as the Ryukyu Islands of Japan in the north Pacific. The habitat of C. atripectoralis overlaps with that of its sibling species C. viridis, although C. viridis can additionally be found in the Red Sea.

C. atripectoralis resides in coral reefs. As adults, C. atripectoralis shows a preference for branching corals, although the species can also be found in plate, sub massive, massive, encrusting, soft, and dead corals. Juveniles exhibit a preference for living in both branching and plate corals, although they have been found in sub massive corals as well. Adults may live in rubble or pavement as well, while juveniles have only been found to live in consolidated pavement. Loss of the coral reef niche is correlated with a decline in C. atripectoralis populations, as this species is highly specialized to live in reefs.

C. atripectoralis can tolerate higher water temperatures relative to cardinalfish that occupy the same habitat. C. atripectoralis does exhibit a reduction in aerobic scope across the high water temperature range of 29 °C to 33 °C; however the fish can still aerobically respire at a rate greater than half of its aerobic scope under normal conditions. The relatively high thermotolerance of C. atripectoralis may allow it to live at latitudes closer to the equator and to resist extinction as global ocean temperatures rise.

== Larval behavior and settlement to coral reefs ==
C. atripectoralis is an oviparous species whose eggs are laid into the water to hatch at a later time. The late-stage larvae of C. atripectoralis reside in the pelagic zone and exhibit a swimming speed range of 21.6 to 25.2 centimeters per second. The late-stage larvae exhibit directionality in their swimming, although there is more variation in directionality in leeward trajectories than in windward trajectories. Additionally, the late-stage larvae of C. atripectoralis exhibit greater variation in their swimming directionality during afternoons with cloudy conditions than in sunny conditions. This suggests that the larvae may use a solar compass to guide their movements. The overall swimming directionality of late-stage C. atripectoralis appears to be southeast in the morning and south-southwest in the afternoon, regardless of where the nearest shore is located. The east-west component of C. atripectoralis larval swimming observed indicates that the larvae move actively rather than floating passively with the current, as the larvae were studied in an area with a north-south current.

C. atripectoralis larva can differentiate biological sounds coming from coral reefs from other, non-biological sounds and alter their behavior in response to the biological sounds. There is currently no evidence that C. atripectoralis larva can localize the source of biological sounds, but it is possible that the larvae's ability to identify nocturnal reef noises may function in combination with other methods, such as a solar compass, to facilitate their success in settling to a coral reef.
