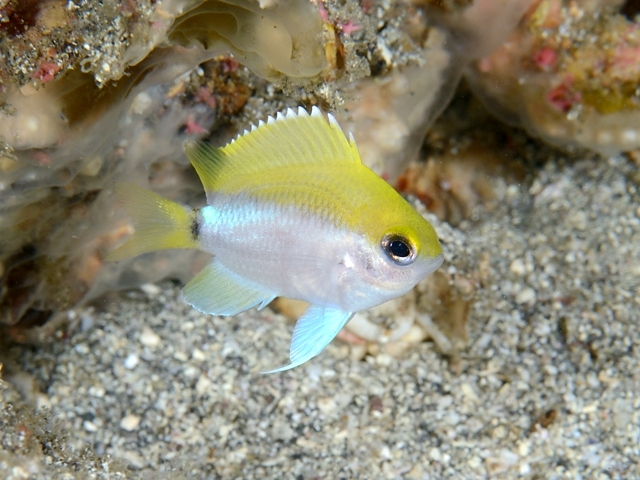
- Juvenile

Conservation status
- Least Concern (IUCN 3.1)

Scientific classification
- Kingdom: Animalia
- Phylum: Chordata
- Class: Actinopterygii
- Order: Blenniiformes
- Family: Pomacentridae
- Genus: Chromis
- Species: C. okamurai

Binomial name
- Chromis okamurai Yamakawa & J. E. Randall, 1989

= Chromis okamurai =

Species of fish

Chromis okamurai is a species of damselfish native to the northwestern Pacific Ocean off southern Japan.
