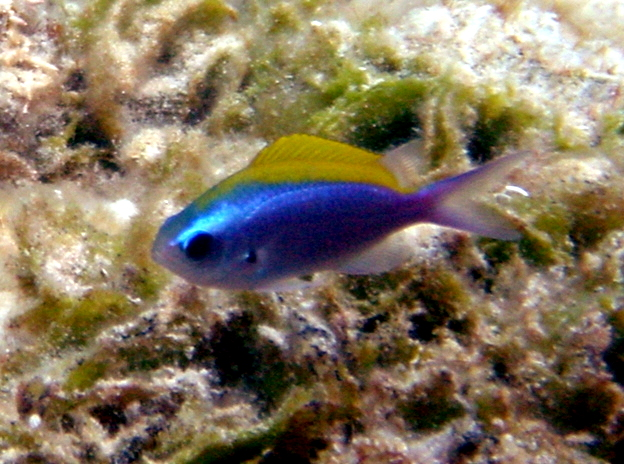
- A juvenile C. ovalis

Conservation status
- Least Concern (IUCN 3.1)

Scientific classification
- Kingdom: Animalia
- Phylum: Chordata
- Class: Actinopterygii
- Order: Blenniiformes
- Family: Pomacentridae
- Genus: Chromis
- Species: C. ovalis

Binomial name
- Chromis ovalis (Steindachner, 1900)

= Chromis ovalis =

Species of fish

Chromis ovalis, commonly known as oval chromis, is a species of damselfish endemic to the Hawaiian archipelago.

== Description & Biology ==
Although they are commonly smaller fish, they can get up to 9 in (22.9 cm) in length, and are grey in color with a blue iridescent, metallic like finish. The younger fish have a yellow dorsal fin with blue tips on it while the older ones on the other hand get more dull in color as they get older. This species feeds on plankton including copepods. This species has high haplotype diversities.

== Distribution & Habitat ==
Chromis ovalis is endemic to the Hawaiian Islands and tends to live near remote islands. They can be found as schools in rocky areas as deep as 20 feet.

== Reproduction ==
The males of this species create nests which are around 3 feet apart in short term nesting areas. In order for the males to get a mate, similar to a mating dance, the male jumps to gain the females attention, if the female is interested then she follows the male to the nesting area to lay her eggs.
