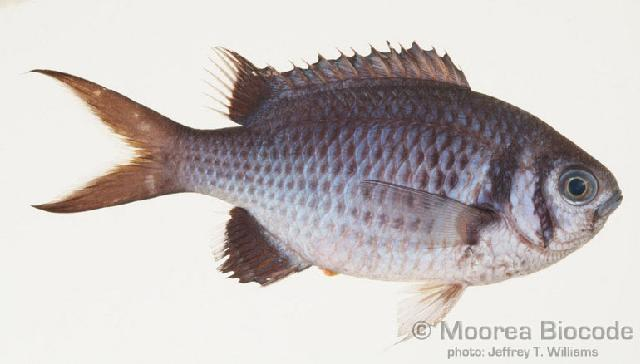

Conservation status
- Least Concern (IUCN 3.1)

Scientific classification
- Kingdom: Animalia
- Phylum: Chordata
- Class: Actinopterygii
- Order: Blenniiformes
- Family: Pomacentridae
- Genus: Chromis
- Species: C. xanthura

Binomial name
- Chromis xanthura (Bleeker, 1854)

= Chromis xanthura =

Species of fish

Chromis xanthura is a species of damselfish found in the Pacific Ocean.

It occasionally makes its way into the aquarium trade.

== Description ==
It grows to a size of 15 cm in length.
