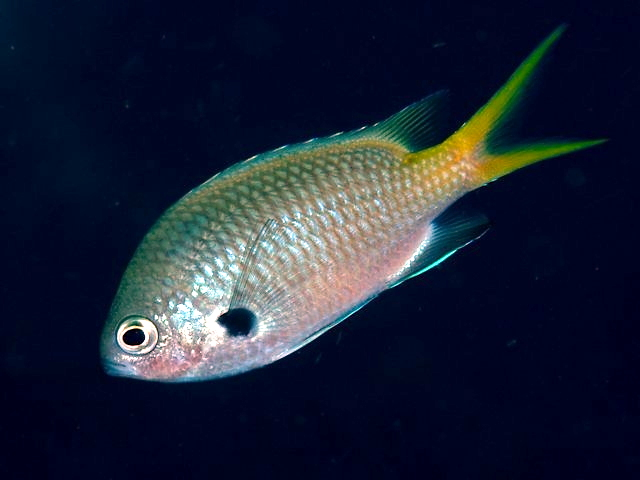

Scientific classification
- Kingdom: Animalia
- Phylum: Chordata
- Class: Actinopterygii
- Order: Blenniiformes
- Family: Pomacentridae
- Genus: Chromis
- Species: C. flavomaculata

Binomial name
- Chromis flavomaculata Kamohara, 1960

= Chromis flavomaculata =

Species of fish

Chromis flavomaculata, commonly known as the yellowspotted chromis, is a Chromis from the Western Pacific. It occasionally makes its way into the aquarium trade. It grows to a size of 16 cm (6.3 in) in length.

== Location and distribution ==
This species is typically found inhabiting lagoons, outer coral reefs, boulder bottoms, and lava cliffs. Found in the Western Pacific, there are two isolated populations, one being found around southern Japan and the other around the Coral Sea.

There is evidence of Chromis flavomaculata being present in the waters surrounding New Zealand. When sea surface temperature rises higher than average, such as in warm summers, researchers from New Zealand have found that there is an increase in the immigration of tropical and subtropical fishes into New Zealand waters. Such is the case of one yellowspotted chromis that was captured by Craig Worthington in March, 1997 in the Bay of Islands. This species of fish is typically never found around this area; this is the first recorded instance.
