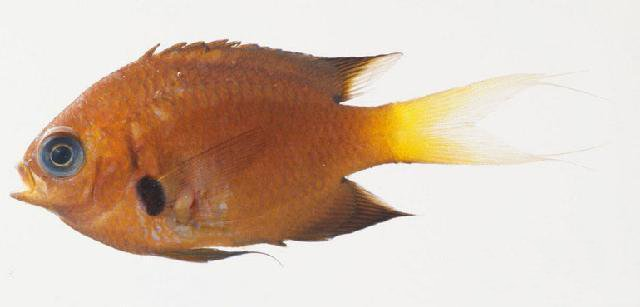

Conservation status
- Least Concern (IUCN 3.1)

Scientific classification
- Kingdom: Animalia
- Phylum: Chordata
- Class: Actinopterygii
- Order: Blenniiformes
- Family: Pomacentridae
- Genus: Azurina
- Species: C. agilis

Binomial name
- Chromis agilis (J. L. B. Smith, 1960)

= Chromis agilis =

Species of fish

Chromis agilis, the agile chromis, is a species of damselfish belonging to the genus Chromis. It can be found in the Indian Ocean, from the Maldives, the Chagos Archipelago, Seychelles, Madagascar, the Comoro Islands, and along the East African coastline between Shimoni in Kenya and Bazaruto in Mozambique. It inhabits clear lagoons and seaward reefs, usually in loose aggregations near caves and ledges. It is commonly found over branching corals and leeward coasts. It is oviparous, and the males of the species guard and aerate the eggs.
