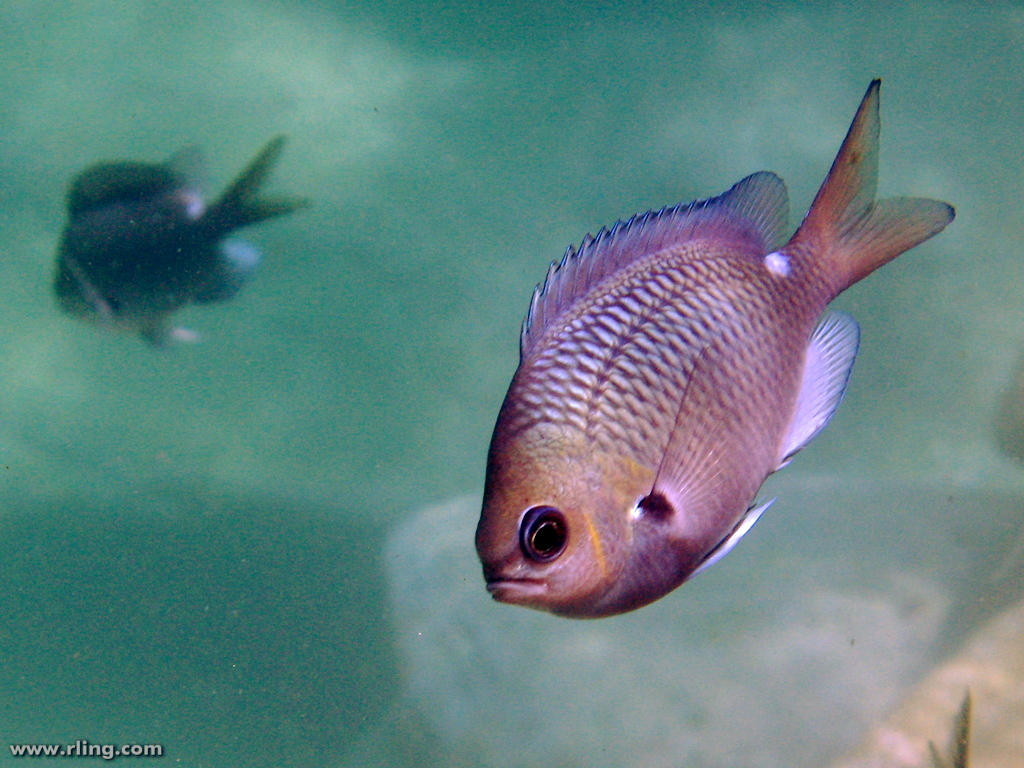

Conservation status
- Least Concern (IUCN 3.1)

Scientific classification
- Domain: Eukaryota
- Kingdom: Animalia
- Phylum: Chordata
- Class: Actinopterygii
- Order: Blenniiformes
- Family: Pomacentridae
- Genus: Chromis
- Species: C. hypsilepis

Binomial name
- Chromis hypsilepis (Günther, 1867)

= One-spot puller =

Species of fish

The one-spot puller (in New Zealand) or brown puller (in Australia), Chromis hypsilepis, is a damselfish of the genus Chromis, found off south-east Australia and between North Cape and East Cape of the North Island of New Zealand to depths of about 60 metres, off rocky coasts. It grows to a length between 15 and 20 centimetres.
