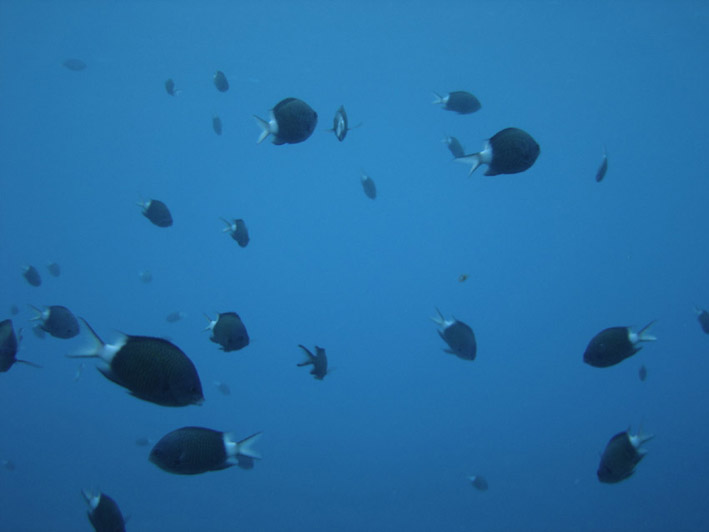

Conservation status
- Least Concern (IUCN 3.1)

Scientific classification
- Kingdom: Animalia
- Phylum: Chordata
- Class: Actinopterygii
- Order: Blenniiformes
- Family: Pomacentridae
- Genus: Azurina
- Species: C. chrysura

Binomial name
- Chromis chrysura (Bliss, 1883)

Synonyms
- Dascyllus isharae P. J. Schmidt, 1931; Chromis isharae P. J. Smith, 1931 Siphonochromis lepidostethicus Fowler, 1946; Lepicephalochromis westalli Whitley, 1964

= Chromis chrysura =

Species of Fish

Chromis chrysura, the stout chromis, is a diurnal species of damselfish belonging to the genus Chromis. Several isolated populations of the species have been found. The first is in Taiwan, the Ryukyu Islands and Southern Japan, the second one lies in the Coral Sea in New Caledonia, Vanuatu, Fiji, and Eastern Australia, and the third one lies in the Western Indian Ocean in Mauritius and Réunion. It is also found in the Philippines and is possibly found in India. It inhabits outer coral or rocky reefs. It usually forms large aggregations in shallow waters and feeds on zooplankton. It is oviparous, and the males of the species guard and aerate the eggs.
