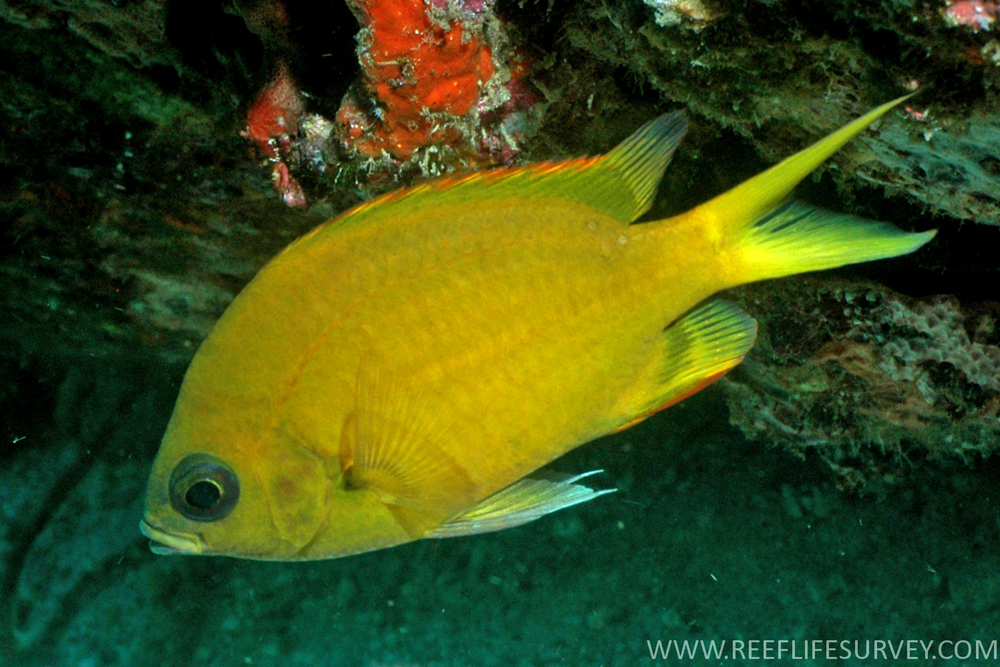

Conservation status
- Least Concern (IUCN 3.1)

Scientific classification
- Kingdom: Animalia
- Phylum: Chordata
- Class: Actinopterygii
- Order: Blenniiformes
- Family: Pomacentridae
- Genus: Chromis
- Species: C. analis

Binomial name
- Chromis analis G. Cuvier, 1830

= Chromis analis =

Species of fish

The yellow chromis (Chromis analis), also known as the yellow puller, is a species of marine fish in the family Pomacentridae. It is widespread throughout the tropical waters of the central Indo-Pacific region. A small fish, it can reach a maximum size of 17 cm in length.
