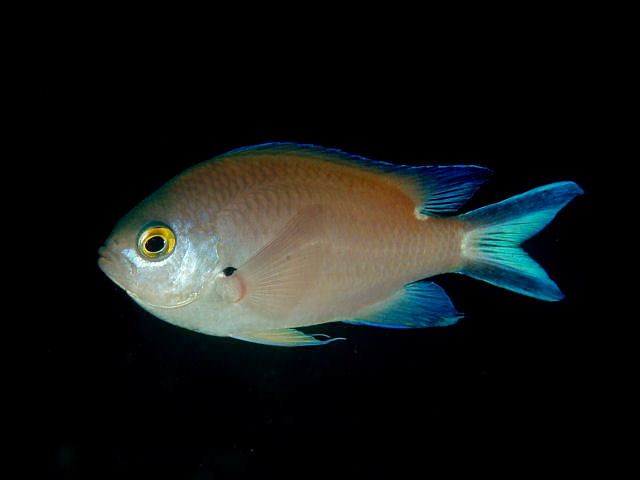

Conservation status
- Least Concern (IUCN 3.1)

Scientific classification
- Domain: Eukaryota
- Kingdom: Animalia
- Phylum: Chordata
- Class: Actinopterygii
- Order: Blenniiformes
- Family: Pomacentridae
- Genus: Chromis
- Species: C. fumea

Binomial name
- Chromis fumea (Tanaka, 1917)

= Chromis fumea =

Species of fish

The smokey chromis (Chromis fumea), also known as the smokey puller or the yellow demoiselle, is a damselfish of the genus Chromis, found in the tropical waters of the eastern Indian Ocean, and the western Pacific Ocean across to north New Zealand, at depths of between 3 and 25 metres, off rocky or coral reef areas. Its length is between 5 and 10 cm.
