= Mark G. Allen =

American electrical engineer

- Born: 1962 (age 63–64)
- Education: University of Pennsylvania (BA, BSE); Massachusetts Institute of Technology (MS, PhD)
- Known for: Wireless implantable MEMS sensors, CardioMEMS
- Awards: IEEE Daniel P. Noble Award (2016); Member, National Academy of Engineering (2023); Member, National Academy of Inventors (2017); IEEE Fellow
- Scientific career
- Fields: Microfabrication, nanotechnology, microelectromechanical systems
- Workplaces: University of Pennsylvania (2013–present); Georgia Institute of Technology (1989–2013)
- Doctoral advisor: Stephen D. Senturia
- Notable students: Prem Chahal

Mark G. Allen (born 1962) is an American electrical engineer and academic specializing in microfabrication, nanotechnology, and microelectromechanical systems (MEMS). He is the Alfred Fitler Moore Professor of Electrical and Systems Engineering at the University of Pennsylvania and founding director of the Singh Center for Nanotechnology. He also leads Penn's Microsensor and Microactuator Research Group.

Allen is a co-founder of CardioMEMS, which developed the first MEMS-based medical device transducer approved by the FDA for permanent human implantation. He is a Fellow of the IEEE, a member of the National Academy of Engineering (elected 2023) and the National Academy of Inventors (elected 2017), and a recipient of the IEEE Daniel P. Noble Award for Emerging Technologies (2016). Before joining Penn, he spent 24 years at the Georgia Institute of Technology, where he held the rank of Regents' Professor and served as Senior Vice Provost for Research and Innovation.

== Education ==
Allen received a BA in chemistry, a BSE in chemical engineering, and a BSE in electrical engineering from the University of Pennsylvania. He then earned an MS in chemical engineering and a PhD in microelectronic materials (1989) from the Massachusetts Institute of Technology, where his doctoral advisor was Stephen D. Senturia.

== Career ==
=== Georgia Institute of Technology (1989–2013) ===
After completing his doctorate in 1989, Allen joined the faculty of the School of Electrical and Computer Engineering at the Georgia Institute of Technology. He rose to the rank of Regents' Professor and held the J.M. Pettit Professorship in Microelectronics.

From 2007 to 2010, Allen served as Senior Vice Provost for Research and Innovation, with oversight of Georgia Tech's annual research budget, its interdisciplinary research centers, and its Office of Federal Relations. In that role he was involved in strategic decisions on cost sharing and research investment, and guided the commercialization of university intellectual property. He has testified before Congress on intellectual property issues facing universities.

From 2011 to 2013, he served as founding Executive Director of the Institute for Electronics and Nanotechnology (IEN), which coordinates Georgia Tech's research activities spanning nanotechnology and electronics and manages the university's nanotechnology infrastructure.

=== University of Pennsylvania (2013–present) ===
In 2013, Allen joined the University of Pennsylvania as the Alfred Fitler Moore Professor of Electrical and Systems Engineering and founding director of the Singh Center for Nanotechnology. His research focuses on micro- and nanofabrication technology, with an emphasis on new approaches to fabricating devices at the micro- to nanoscale from both silicon and non-silicon materials.

== Research and publications ==
Allen has published approximately 450 journal articles and conference proceedings and holds nearly 60 patents. According to Google Scholar, his work has been cited over 32,000 times, with an h-index of 83. He has supervised approximately 50 doctoral students across disciplines including electrical engineering, chemical engineering, mechanical engineering, materials science, and biomedical engineering; roughly one-third of his former PhD students hold faculty positions.

== Companies ==
Allen has co-founded several companies based on his research in MEMS and microfabrication.

=== CardioMEMS ===
CardioMEMS, founded in 2001, commercialized wireless implantable microsensors for the treatment of aneurysms and congestive heart failure. Its wireless aneurysm pressure monitor was highlighted by the FDA in its 2005 Office of Device Evaluation annual report as a cleared device likely to have a significant impact on patient care. The company's second product, a MEMS-based wireless implantable hemodynamic monitor for heart failure patients, completed a 550-patient clinical trial and received FDA approval, becoming the first MEMS-based medical device transducer approved for permanent human implantation. CardioMEMS received the 2006 Small Times Company of the Year award and the 2006 Frost & Sullivan Patient Monitoring Product Innovation of the Year Award. It was acquired by St. Jude Medical (now Abbott) in 2014.

=== Axion BioSystems ===
Axion BioSystems, founded in 2008 and headquartered in Atlanta, commercializes microelectrode arrays for in vitro interfacing with electrogenic cells, with applications in neural and cardiac research as well as pharmaceutical screening. The company received the Tibbetts Award from the U.S. Small Business Administration in 2012.

=== EnaChip ===
EnaChip, launched in 2017, focuses on nanoengineered materials for ultracompact power supplies.

== Editorial and professional service ==
Allen served as editor-in-chief of the Journal of Micromechanics and Microengineering (published by the Institute of Physics) from 2009 to 2013, and serves on the editorial board of Microsystems and Nanoengineering (Nature Publishing Group). He co-chaired the 1996 IEEE/ASME Microelectromechanical Systems Conference and the 2012 Power MEMS Conference, and chaired the 2016 Solid State Sensors, Actuators, and Microsystems Conference. He has served as a member of the MIT Corporation Visiting Committee for Sponsored Research.

== Awards and honors ==
- IEEE Fellow
- IEEE Daniel P. Noble Award for Emerging Technologies (2016), for his work in MEMS
- Member, National Academy of Inventors (2017)
- Member, National Academy of Engineering (2023)
