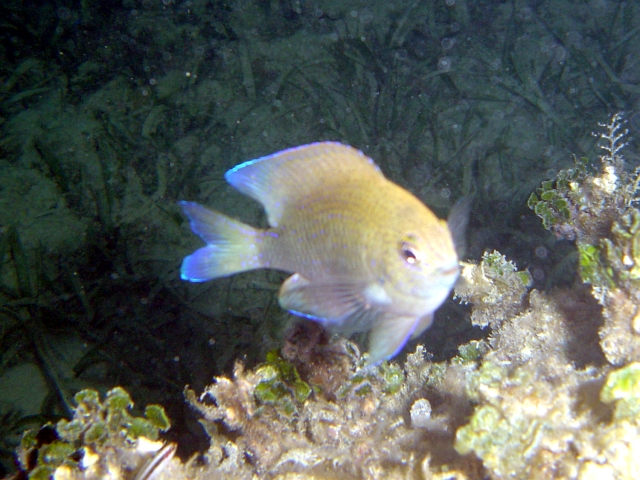

Conservation status
- Least Concern (IUCN 3.1)

Scientific classification
- Kingdom: Animalia
- Phylum: Chordata
- Class: Actinopterygii
- Order: Blenniiformes
- Family: Pomacentridae
- Genus: Azurina
- Species: C. scotti

Binomial name
- Chromis scotti Emery, 1968

= Chromis scotti =

Species of fish

Chromis scotti, the purple reef fish, is a species of fish in the family Pomacentridae. It occurs from southern Florida through the Caribbean Sea to northern Brazil. The specific name honours William Beverly Scott (1917–2014) who was the Curator of Ichthyology and Herpetology at the Royal Ontario Museum in Toronto.
