= Chromis lubbocki =

Conservation status
- Least Concern (IUCN 3.1)

Scientific classification
- Kingdom: Animalia
- Phylum: Chordata
- Class: Actinopterygii
- Order: Blenniiformes
- Family: Pomacentridae
- Genus: Chromis
- Species: C. lubbocki

Binomial name
- Chromis lubbocki A. J. Edwards, 1986

Species of fish

Chromis lubbocki is a species of marine fish of the family Pomacentridae. This fish grows to 12.5 cm maximal length. It occurs in the eastern Atlantic Ocean, off the coast of Cape Verde. The specific name honours the marine biologist Hugh Roger Lubbock (1951-1981) who led the Cambridge Expedition to Saint Paul's Rocks, part of the Cape Verde Islands, who collected the type specimen and realised it was a new species.
