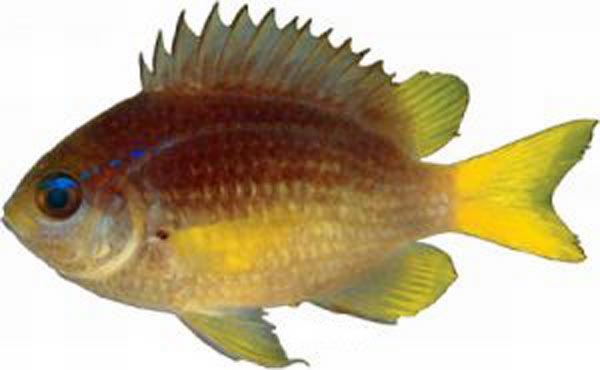

Conservation status
- Least Concern (IUCN 3.1)

Scientific classification
- Kingdom: Animalia
- Phylum: Chordata
- Class: Actinopterygii
- Order: Blenniiformes
- Family: Pomacentridae
- Genus: Azurina
- Species: C. enchrysura

Binomial name
- Chromis enchrysura (D. S. Jordan & C. H. Gilbert, 1882)

= Chromis enchrysura =

Species of fish

The yellowtail reef fish (Chromis enchrysura) is a species of damselfish in the family Pomacentridae.

It is native to the Atlantic Ocean.

Occasionally, they are found in the aquarium trade.

== Distribution and habitat ==
This species of fish is native to the Atlantic Ocean.

It is also found partially around the Indian Ocean.

Western Atlantic Ocean populations are found around the Gulf of Mexico, the Bahamas, the Caribbean Sea, and Brazil.

In the eastern Atlantic Ocean, they are found in western Africa, from the Canary Islands down to Angola.

The population in the Indian Ocean is found around South Africa.

== Description ==
Adults can grow up to a maximum size of 10 centimetres (3.9 in).

They have 13 dorsal spines, 11 to 13 dorsal soft rays, 2 anal spines, and 11 to 13 anal soft rays.

== Colouring ==
This fish is mainly brown.

Its pectoral, caudal, and the backs of its dorsal and anal fins are yellow. The area around the top of its eyes are purple. The rest of the fish is white.
