= ZooBank =

International web registry for animal names

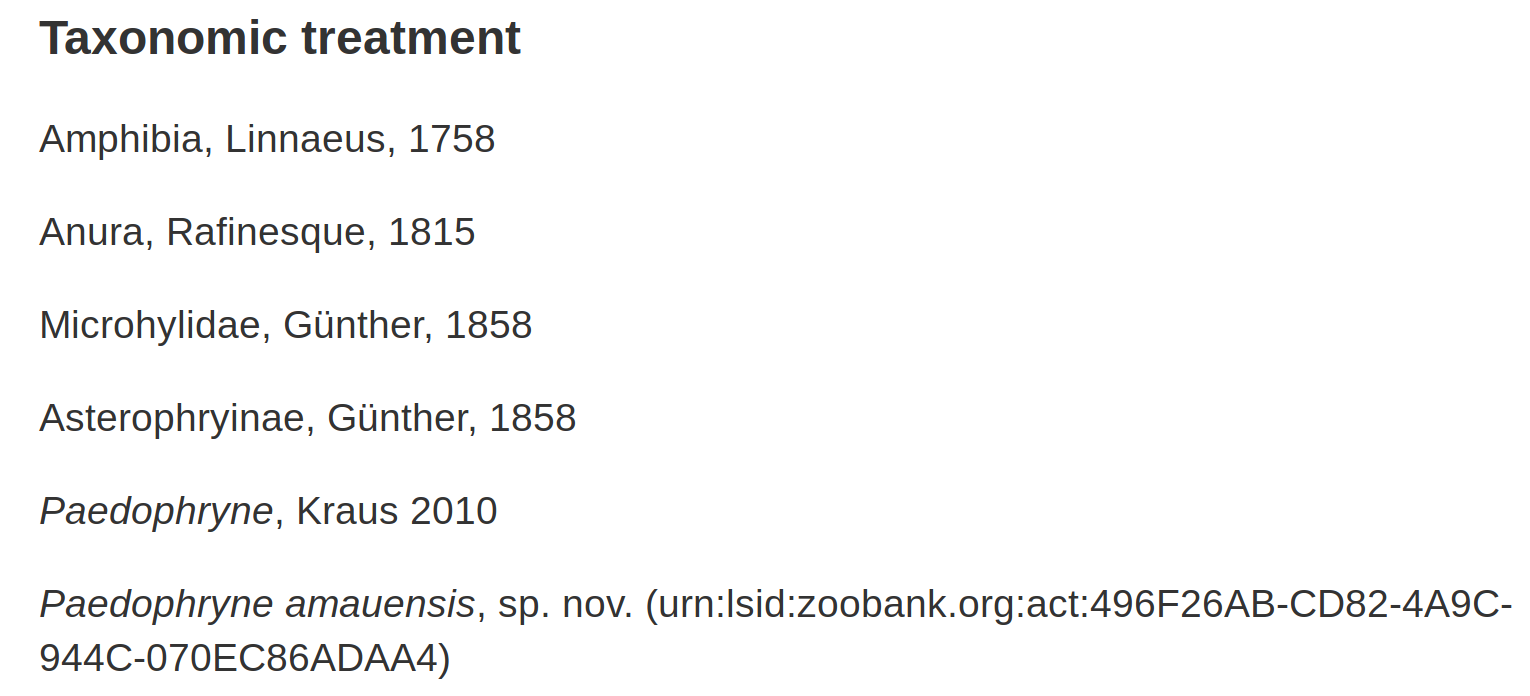
The taxon treatment for the frog Paedophryne amauensis, mentioning the LSID for this nomenclatural act.

ZooBank is an open access website intended to be the official International Commission on Zoological Nomenclature (ICZN) registry of zoological nomenclature. Any nomenclatural acts (e.g. publications that create or change a taxonomic name) published electronically need to be registered with ZooBank prior to publication to be "officially" recognized by the ICZN Code of Nomenclature. Acts published in physical publications are encouraged, but not required to be registered prior to their publication.

Life Science Identifiers (LSIDs) are used as the globally unique identifier for ZooBank registration entries.

The ZooBank prototype was seeded with data from Index to Organism Names (http://www.organismnames.com), which was compiled from the scientific literature in Zoological Record now owned by Thomson Reuters.

== History ==
ZooBank was officially proposed in 2005 by the executive secretary of ICZN. The registry was live on 10 August 2006 with 1.5 million species entered.

The first ZooBank LSIDs were issued on 1 January 2008, precisely 250 years after 1 January 1758, which is the date defined by the ICZN Code as the official start of scientific zoological nomenclature. Chromis abyssus was the first species entered into the ZooBank system with a timestamp of 2008-01-01T00:00:02.

== Contents ==
Four main types of data objects are stored in ZooBank. Nomenclatural acts are governed by the ICZN Code of Nomenclature, and are typically "original descriptions" of new scientific names, however other acts, such as emendations and lectotypifications, are also governed by the ICZN code and technically require registration by ZooBank. Publications include journal articles and other publications containing Nomenclatural Acts. Authors records the academic authorship of Nomenclatural Acts. Type Specimens record the biological type specimens of animals which are provisionally registered, until the bodies responsible for such types implement their own registries.

In addition to those, periodicals which have published articles are also entities within the system, providing access to a list of "Nomenclatural Acts" published in the periodical over time.

== Electronic publications ==
Traditionally, taxonomic data was published in journals or books. However, with the increase in electronic publications, the ICZN established new rules that include e-publications, especially electronic only publications. Such publications are now regulated by amendments of ICZN Articles 8, 9, 10, 21 and 78. Nomenclatural acts that are published (after 2011) in electronic only papers are only recognized if they have been registered with ZooBank. The Zoobank registration must be indicated in the digital publication.

== See also ==
- Plazi
