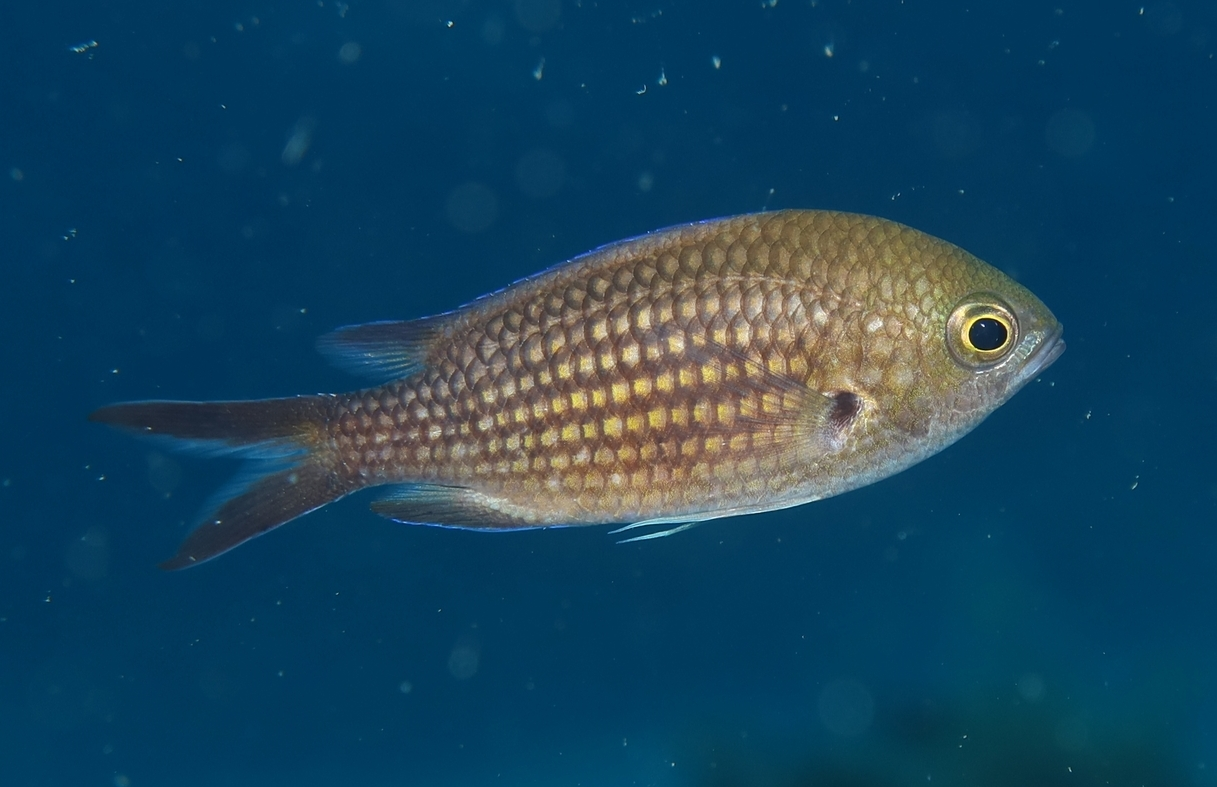
- In French Riviera

Conservation status
- Least Concern (IUCN 3.1)

Scientific classification
- Kingdom: Animalia
- Phylum: Chordata
- Class: Actinopterygii
- Division: Teleostei
- Order: Blenniiformes
- Family: Pomacentridae
- Genus: Chromis
- Species: C. chromis

Binomial name
- Chromis chromis (Linnaeus, 1758)
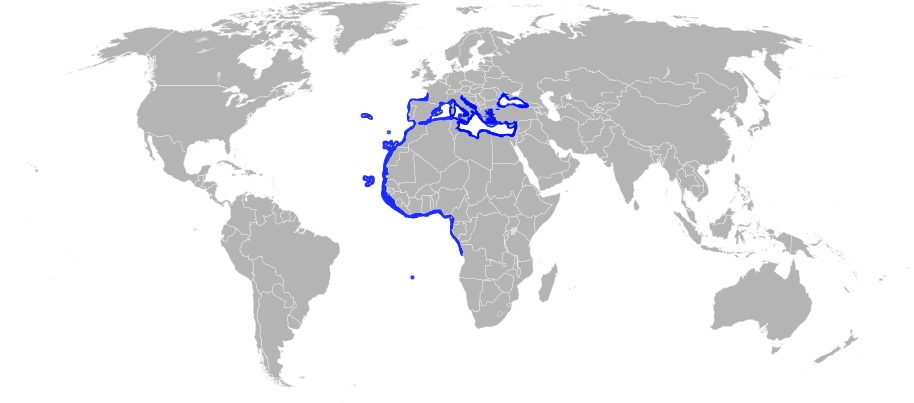

Synonyms
- Sparus chromis Linnaeus, 1758; Heliastes chromis (Linnaeus, 1758); Chromis castanea Cuvier, 1814; Heliastes castanea (Cuvier, 1814); Chromis mediteranea Cloquet, 1817

= Chromis chromis =

Species of fish

Chromis chromis, the damselfish or Mediterranean chromis, is a small species of ray-finned fish of the family Pomacentridae from the Eastern Atlantic and Mediterranean.

== Description ==
Chromis chromis has an oval and laterally compressed body with an noticeably large eye. Its mouth is strongly protractile, reaching to below the centre of the eye, with small canine-like teeth set in 3 rows on the jaws. The preoperculum is not serrated and the anterior gill arch has 30 slender gill rakers. There are 13–14 spines and 10–11 soft rays in the dorsal fin and in the anal fin has 11 spines and 10–12 soft rays. Its body is covered in large scales, including the head, and there are 24–30 scales along the lateral line. The youngest fish are a brilliant iridescent blue in colour; older juveniles have blue stripes with the dorsal and anal fins outlined in blue while the adults are dark brown with the centres of each scale a paler golden brown or grey-brow and with the edge of the caudal fin lacking any colour, especially in the centre of the fork. The males become a vivid pale violet. There is a single pair of nostrils.

It can grow up to a size of 25 centimetres (9.8 in) in length, with a common length of 13 centimetres (5.1 in).

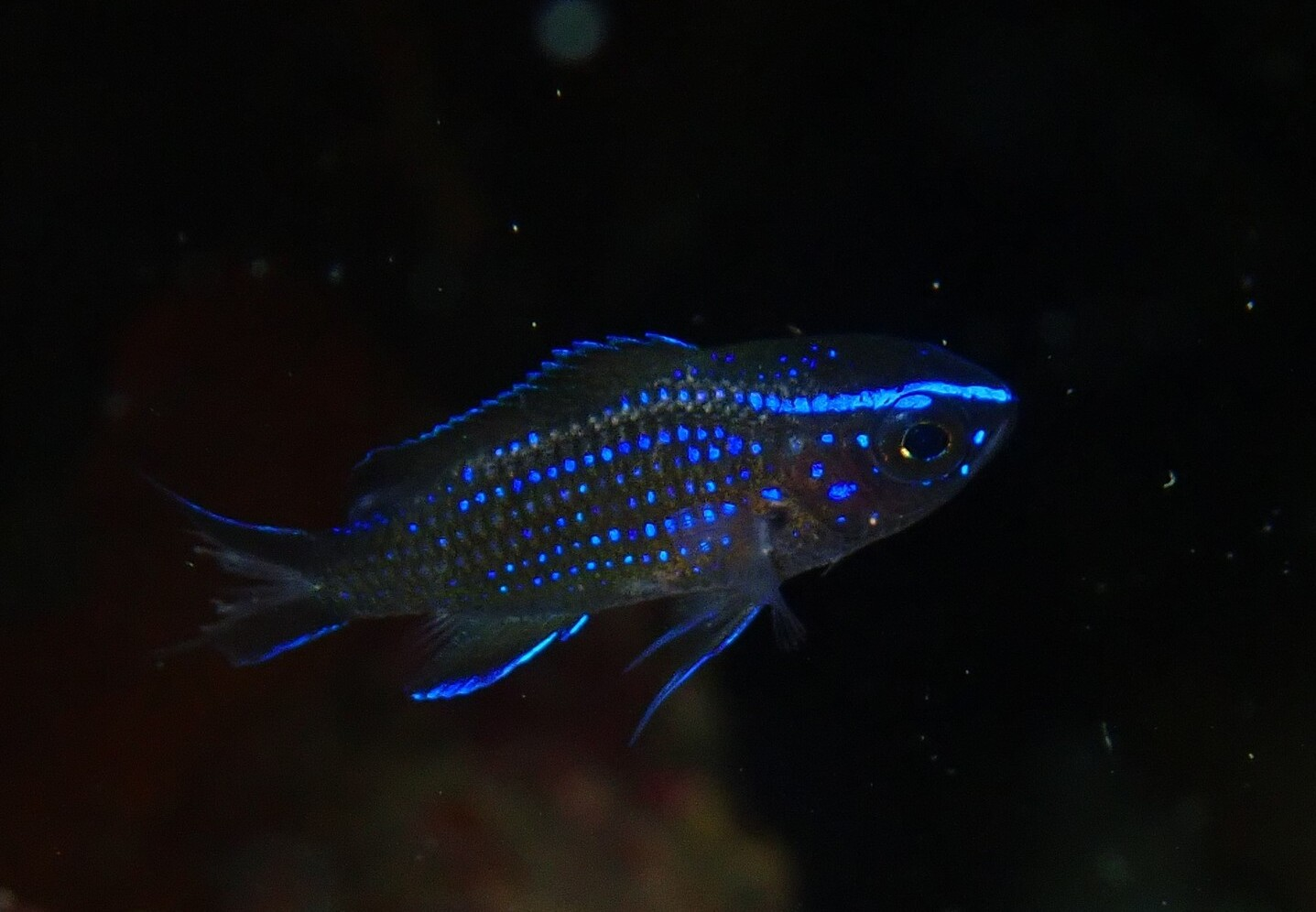
Juvenile

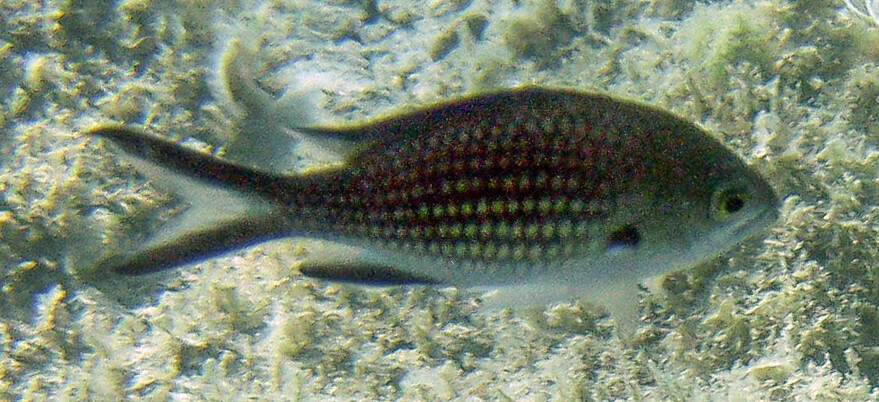
Adult

== Distribution and habitat ==
Chromis chromis occurs in the Black Sea, Mediterranean Sea and eastern Atlantic, from Portugal to Angola including the Macaronesian Islands and the Gulf of Guinea Islands, appearing to be commoner off islands than off the mainland. It is uncommon in the Black Sea and Sea of Marmara.

C. chromis inhabits littoral, mainly in rocky areas from 2 to 40 metres (6.6 to 131.2 ft) in depth, in small shoals in midwater above or near rocky reefs and above sea-grass meadows.

== Diet ==
It feeds on small zooplankton and benthic algae. Its main food components are copepods, appendicularia, cladocera, gastropod larvae, bivalve larvae, fish eggs and fish larvae.

C. chromis feeding patterns are altered when schools are confronted with an increase in top water activity, resultantly, the species obtained a behavioral response referred to as polarizing. Polarization occurs when the species dives to deeper depths, leaving their food behind, as a mechanism to avoid confrontation.

== Reproduction ==
Spawning depends on location, but it occurs during summer. The male and females pair up and engage in courtship behaviour and the eggs are laid in a nest which is created on rocky, sometimes sandy bottoms. The eggs adhere to the substrate and are guarded by the male. The female can lay between 6,050 and 73,688 eggs.

== Fishing ==
Due to small size Chromis chromis has minor role in commercial fishing. As a game fish, it is often caught during the day on light tackle. Small hooks are baited with bread, pasta, small chunks of fish, mussels, worms, small prawns etc. It can be caught in fish traps and nets. Due to small size, it is rarely caught with a speargun. It is also used as a baitfish for larger species which predate on damselfish schools such as conger eel Conger conger and common dentex Dentex dentex.

== Gallery ==
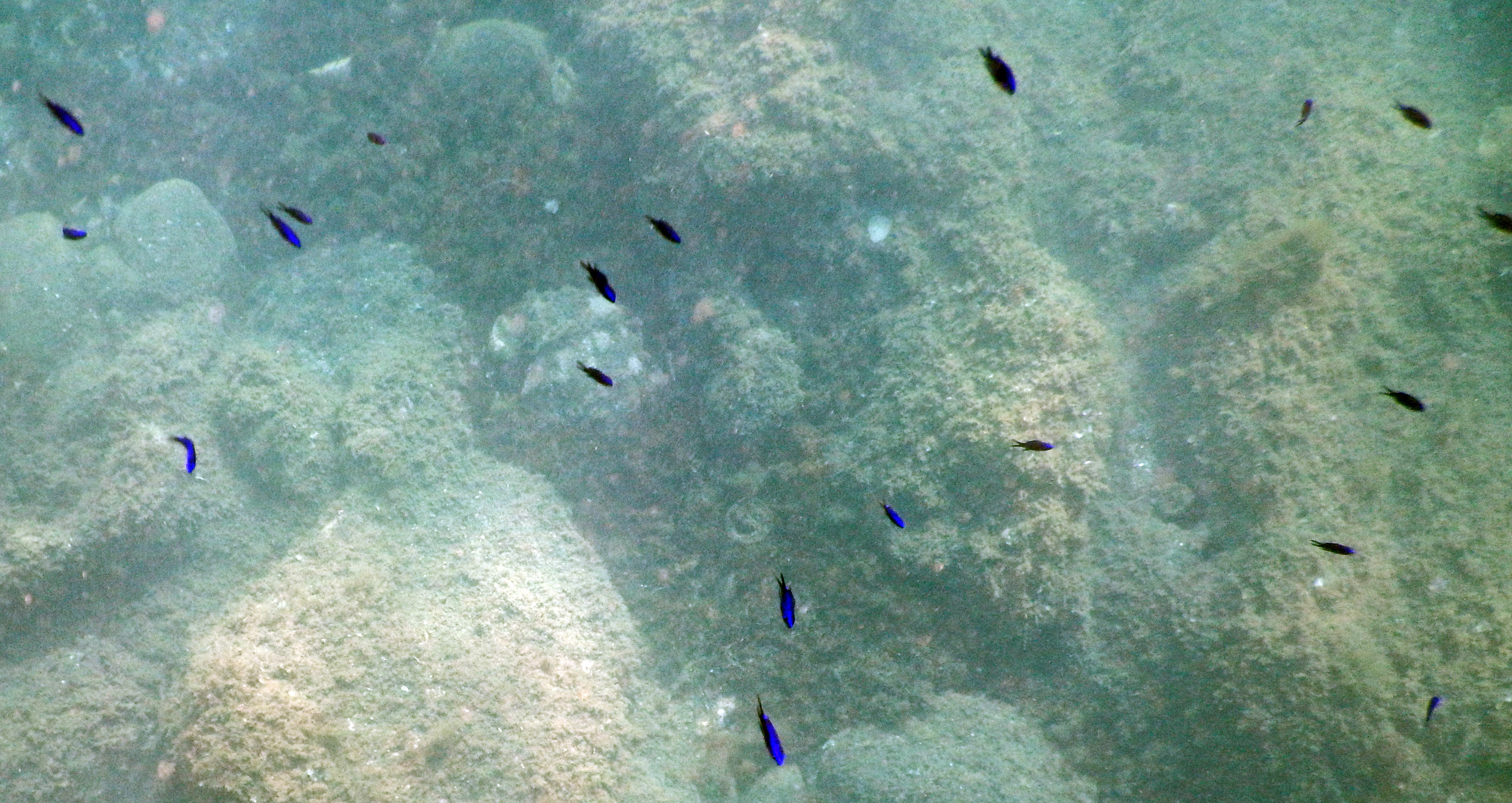
Juveniles in Argelès-sur-Mer, France

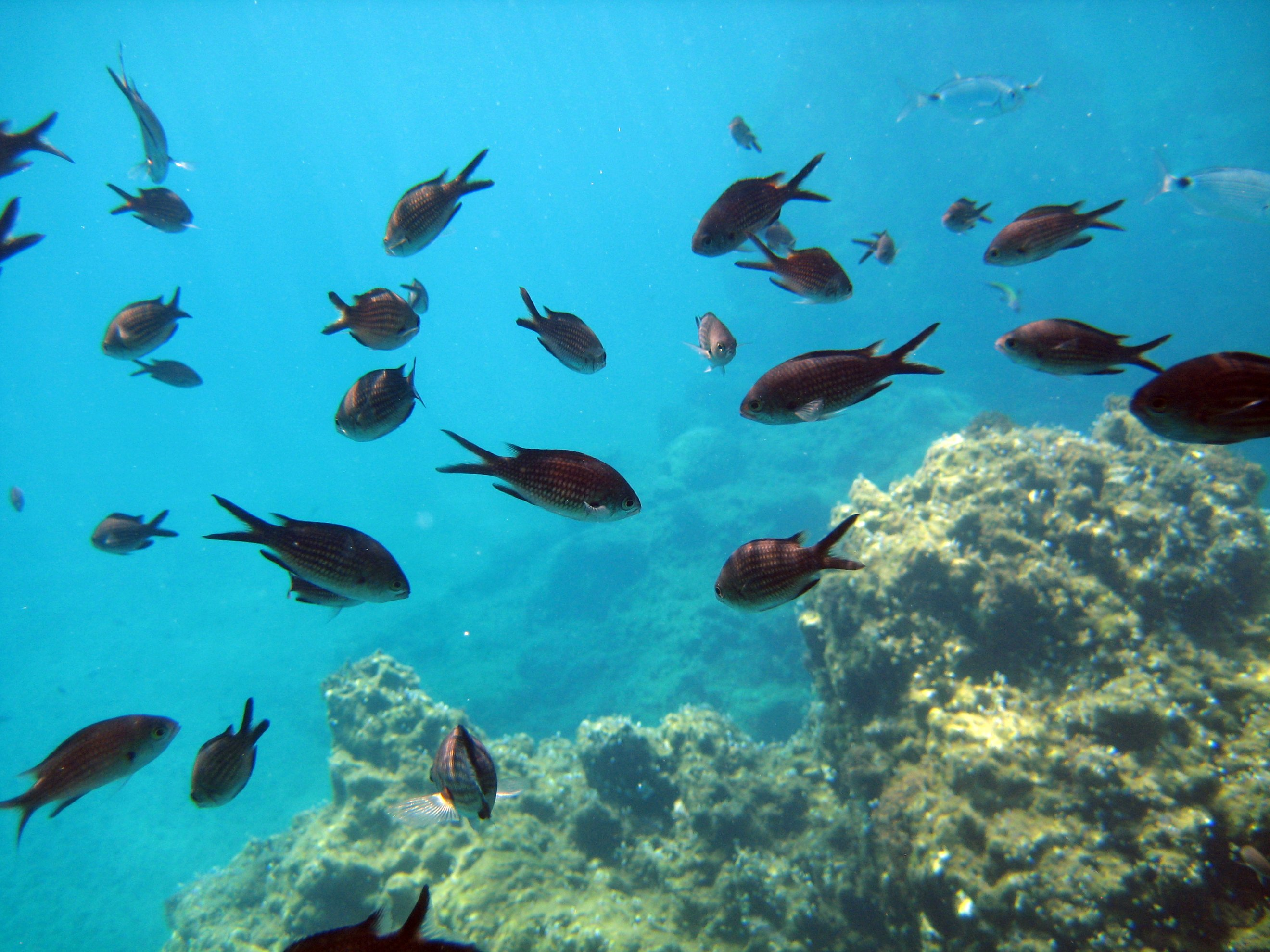
Schooling adults (saddled seabream in the background)

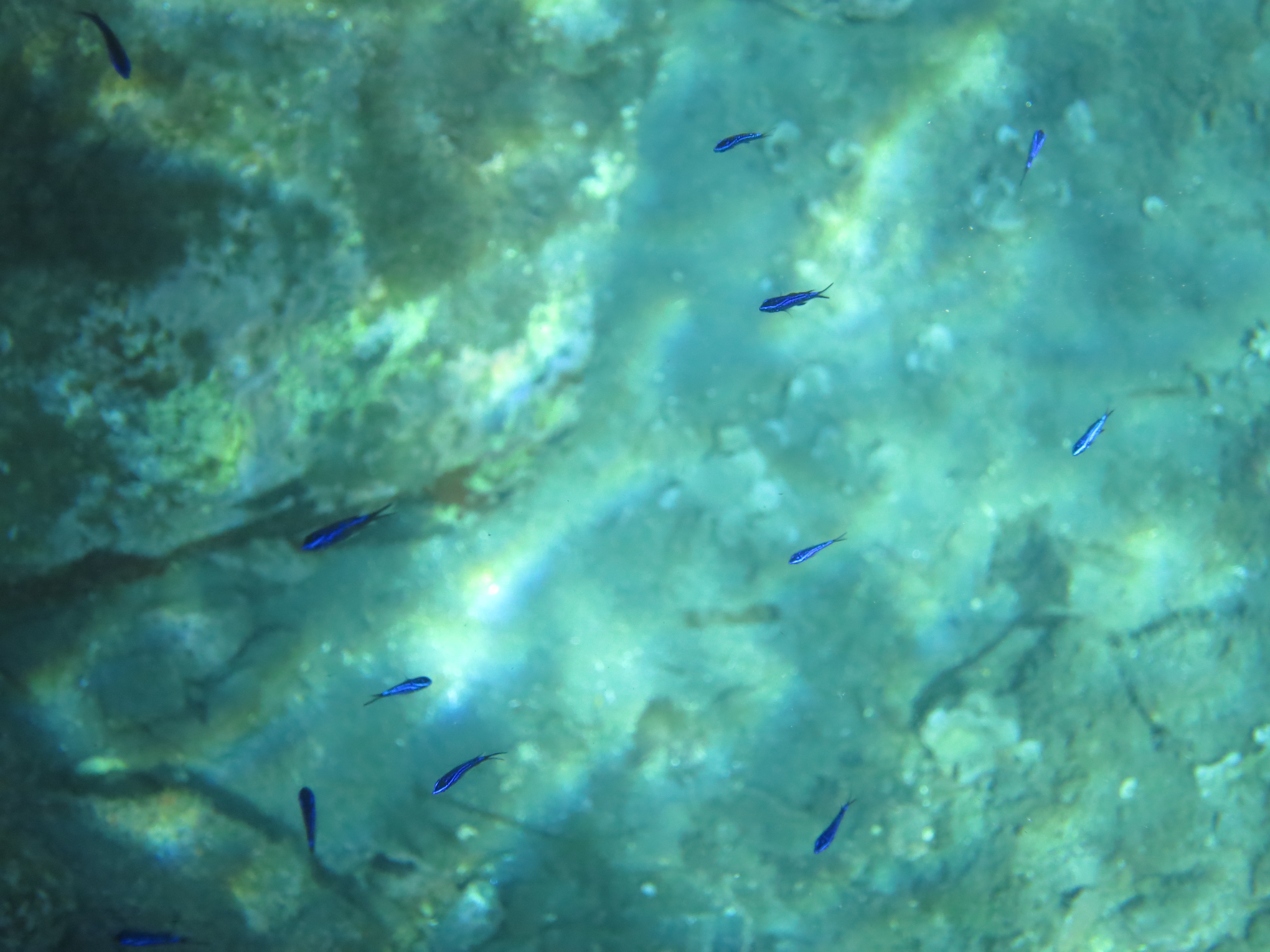
Juveniles

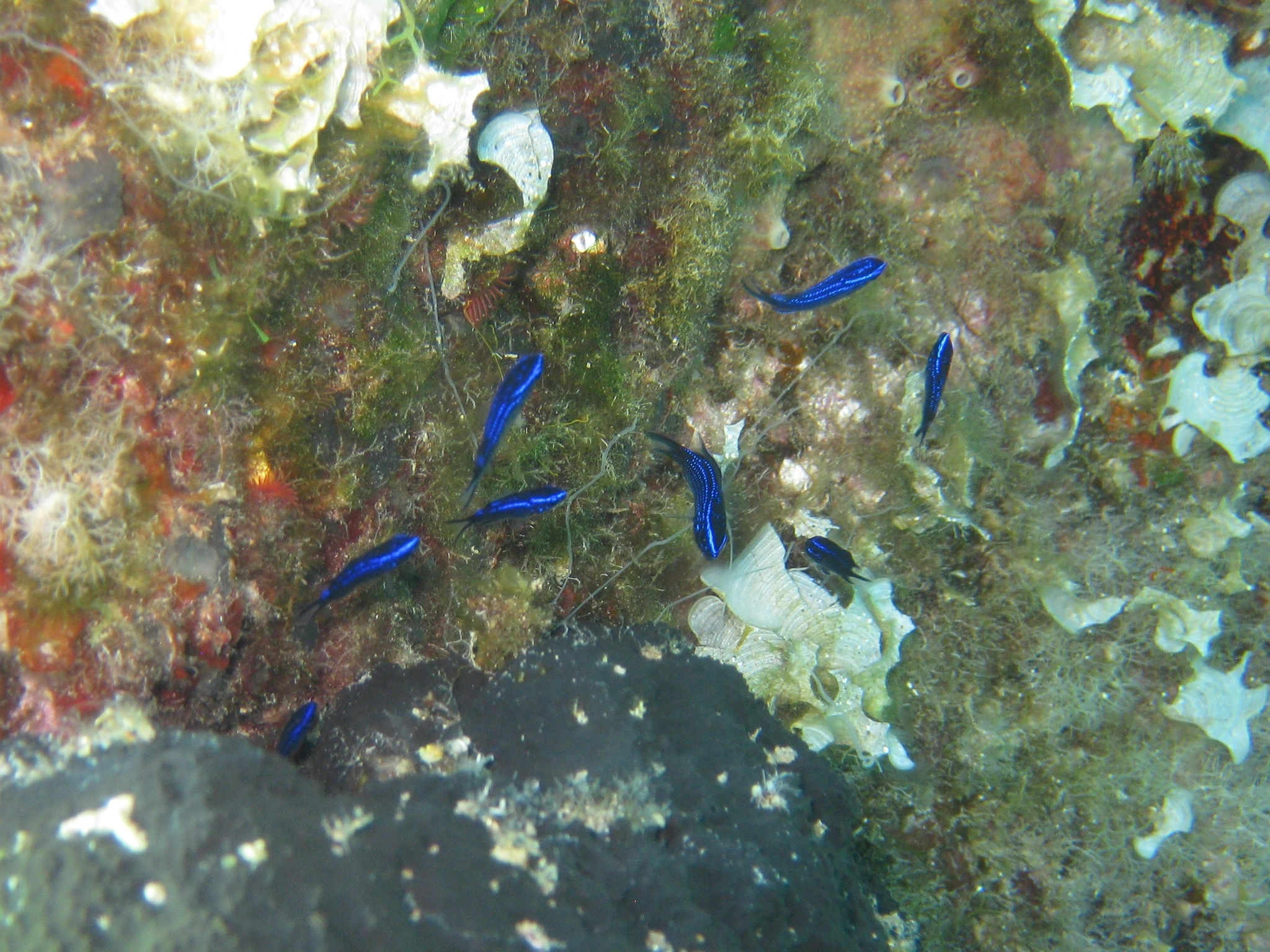
Juveniles
