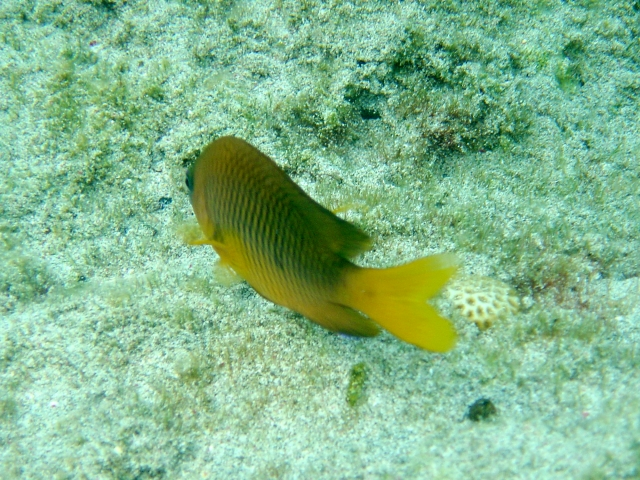

Conservation status
- Least Concern (IUCN 3.1)

Scientific classification
- Kingdom: Animalia
- Phylum: Chordata
- Class: Actinopterygii
- Order: Blenniiformes
- Family: Pomacentridae
- Genus: Azurina
- Species: C. insolata

Binomial name
- Chromis insolata (Cuvier, 1830)

= Chromis insolata =

Species of fish

Chromis insolata is a species of fish in the family Pomacentridae. It is commonly known as the sunshinefish, and found in the Western Atlantic. It occasionally makes its way into the aquarium trade. It grows to a size of 16 cm in length.
