= Richard Pyle =

American ichthyologist and scuba diver

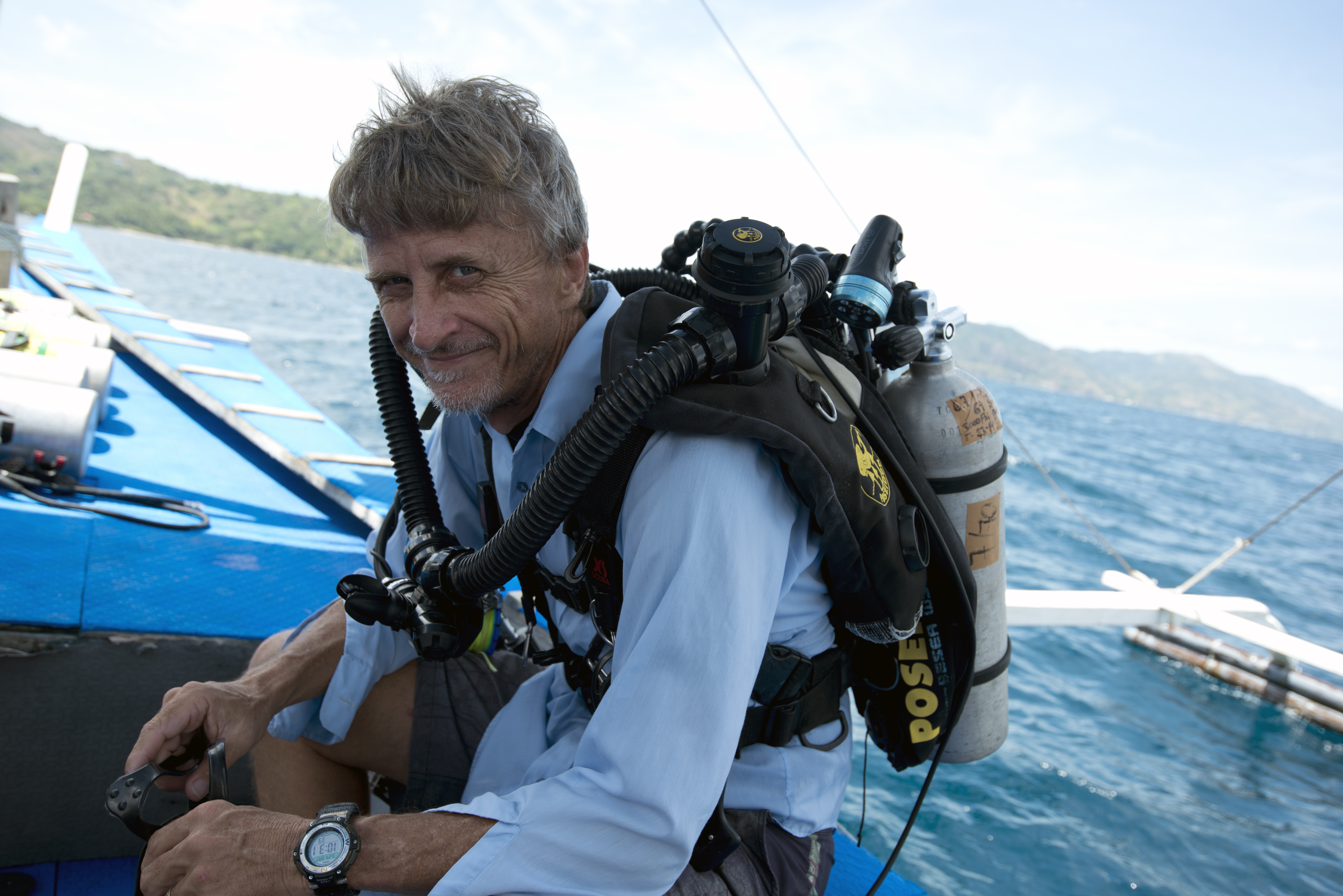
- Pyle in the Philippines
- Born: 24 March 1967 (age 59); Kailua, Hawaii
- Education: Ph.D., Zoology
- Alma mater: University of Hawaii at Manoa, Honolulu
- Scientific career
- Fields: Marine biology
- Institutions: Bishop Museum

Richard Lawrence Pyle (born 24 March 1967) is a scuba diver and ichthyologist working on Hawaii.

Pyle discovered the principle of "Pyle stops" when decompressing from many deep dives in search of new species of fish, and has identified hundreds of new species.

He is the author of over 130 publications.

In October 2015, he won second prize, an award of €5,000, in the GBIF Ebbe Nielsen Challenge, a Global Biodiversity Information Facility competition, for BioGUID.org, "a web service that crosslinks identifiers linked to data objects in the biodiversity realm". At that time, the site contained over one billion (1,000,000,000) identifiers. He has been honoured by having the twilight fangblenny (Petroscirtes pylei) named in his honor.

Pyle is a member of ZooBank Committee and the leader of ZooBank architecture policy working group.

== See also ==
- Category:Taxa named by Richard Pyle
