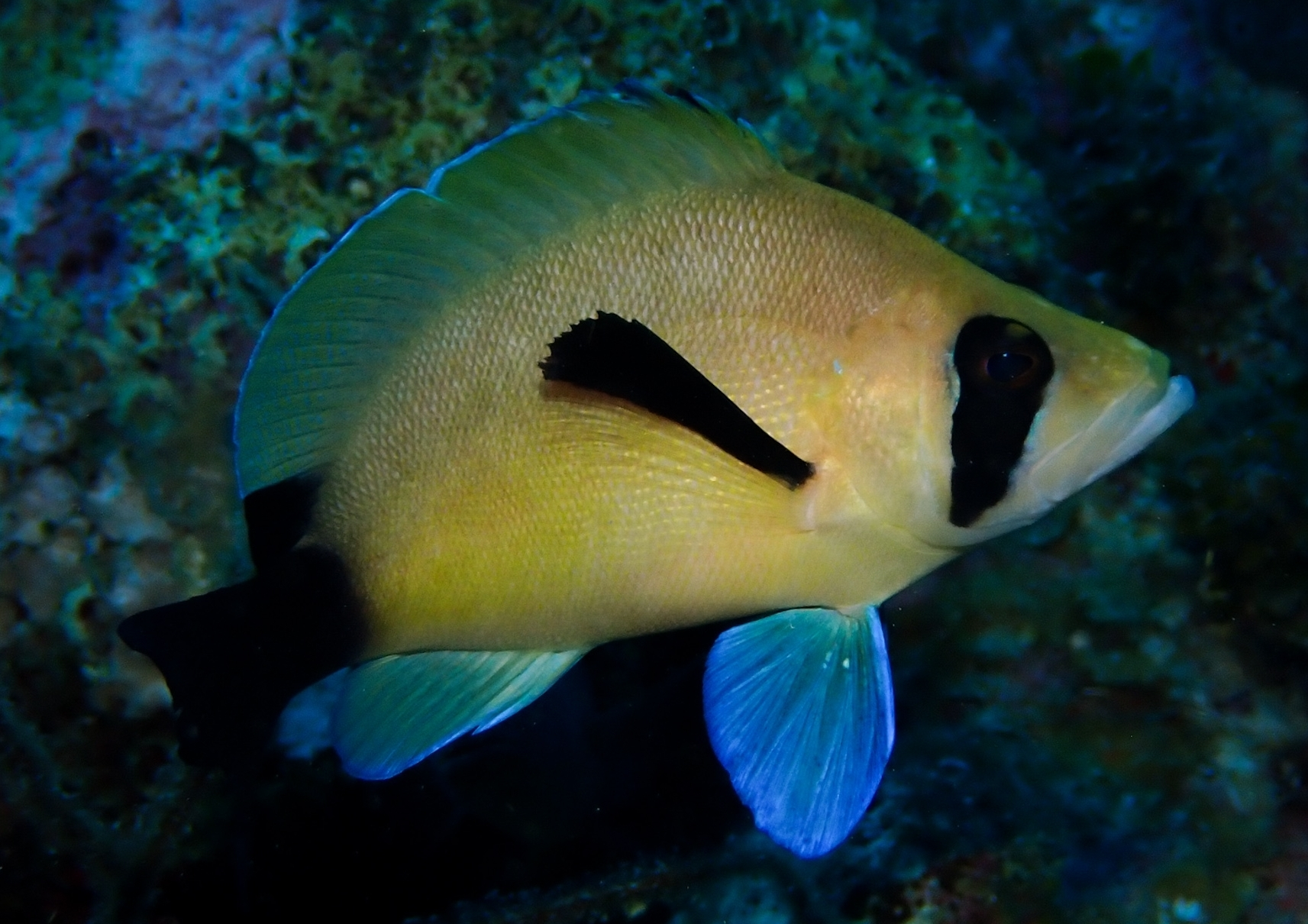

Conservation status
- Least Concern (IUCN 3.1)

Scientific classification
- Kingdom: Animalia
- Phylum: Chordata
- Class: Actinopterygii
- Division: Teleostei
- Order: Perciformes
- Family: Serranidae
- Genus: Hypoplectrus
- Species: H. providencianus

Binomial name
- Hypoplectrus providencianus Acero P & Garzón-Ferreira, 1994

= Masked hamlet =

Species of fish

The masked hamlet (Hypoplectrus providencianus) is a species of marine ray-finned fish, a sea bass from the subfamily Serraninae which is part of the family Serranidae, which also includes the groupers and anthias. This species is found in the western Atlantic Ocean in the Caribbean Sea and has been recorded from the coast of Central America from Quintana Roo in Mexico to Bocas del Toro in Panama and from Jamaica to Puerto Rico, as well as in the Turks and Caicos and the Cayman Islands. Its specific name refers to Providencia Island, Colombia where the type was collected. It was also recorded from other islands in the Archipelago of San Andrés, Providencia and Santa Catalina. They are a unique species in the Hypoplectrus genus, defined by their unique color morph. Their behavior is largely similar to that of other hamlets, especially in their diet and egg-trading spawning patterns.

== Description ==
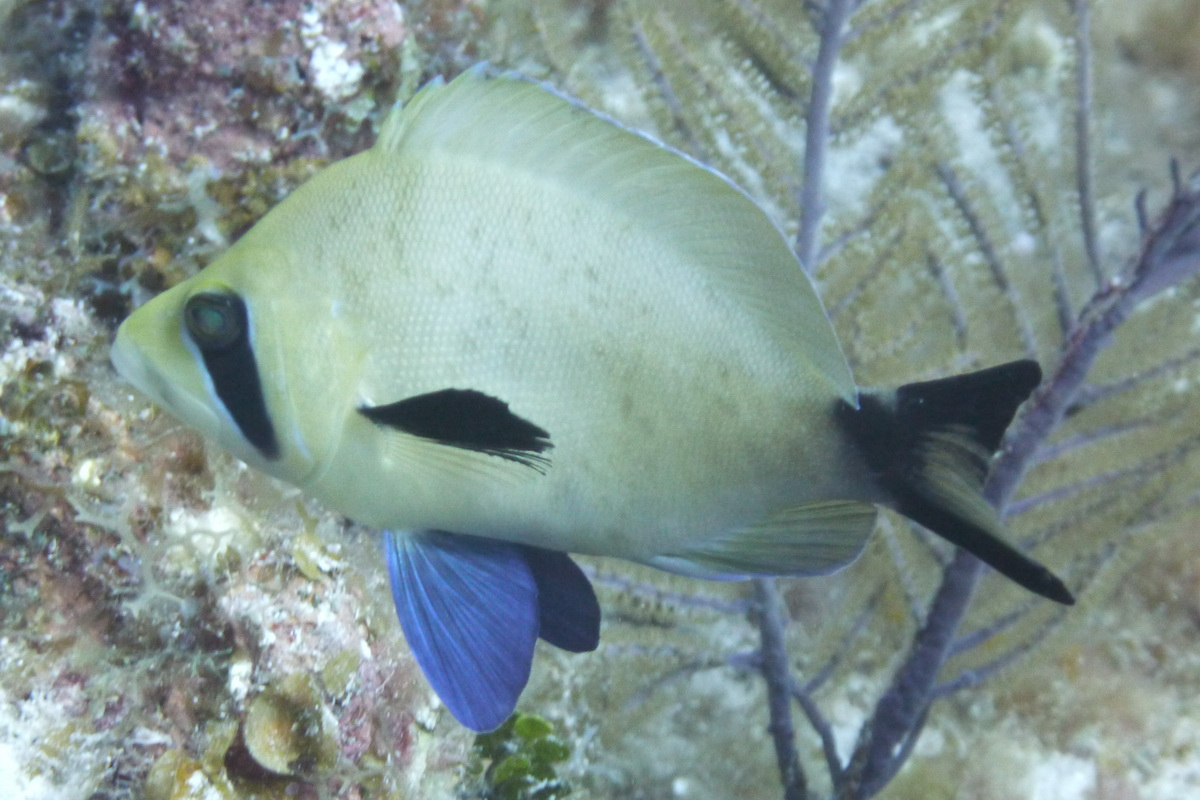
In Grand Cayman

H. providencianus can reach lengths of up to 13 cm. This species' body plan is similar to that of unicolor hamlets. H. providencianus possesses a spine at the base of the dorsal fin, a protruding upper jaw, a flattened head, and a lateral line running down the flank.

Presumed to be unique to H. providencianus is a streak of black that surrounds the eye. In addition to this, black coloration is present in most areas of the pectoral fins, being accented around the upper edges of the fin. The caudal fin is also black, with a darker shade of black being present in the upper and lower lobes of the fin. Also, a black caudal saddle may be present, or completely absent entirely. The body is white in areas lacking black pigmentation. Also, in comparison to other hamlets, H. providencianus lacks spots on the rostrum.

Due to the similarities between the morphology of H. providencianus in comparison to that of its relatives, it is a difficult to classify the various species of the Hypoplectrus genus. It is believed that H. providencianus is a color morph of the genus Hypoplectrus.

== Distribution and habitat ==
H. providencianus resides in coastal waters of the Caribbean, including near Mexico, Panama, Jamaica, Puerto Rico, Turks and Caicos, the Cayman Islands, Colombia, and the Archipelago of San Andrés, Providencia and Santa Catalina.

H. providencianus commonly makes its habitat in patch corals inside lagoons in relatively shallow waters of depths of about three to ten meters below sea level. While the species may be present in the offshore waters of islands, they are the only species of Hypoplectrus that is completely absent from continental shelves. In addition, there is a lack of specific areas where H. providencianus congregate. The masked hamlet tends to swim in lower sections of the water column near its habitat.

In terms of diet, H. providencianus feeds on crustaceans and other small fish, much like the diets of other species in the Hypoplectrus genus.

== Behavior ==
Hamlets, as a genus, are generally territorial and eat invertebrates by gleaning (plucking them off from structures). Each species in the genus generally exhibits the same feeding behaviors, except for the H. indigo which mostly eats Chromis cyaneus.

This species lives a primarily solitary life and interacts with others during mating periods.

Hamlets, including H. providencianus, are simultaneous hermaphrodites, which means they can produce both sperm and eggs at the same time, and each individual can play the role of male or female. They egg trade which is the process of switching gender roles during a spawning session while exchanging gametes. They spawn multiple times during each session. It is unknown exactly how frequently they switch off roles, but in Hypoplectrus sp., it has been hypothesized that each individual swaps their gender role after each successive spawn, one releasing sperm and the other releasing eggs. They broadcast spawn, which means they release the gametes into the water. To figure out when to release their gametes, they use sounds to communicate with their partner. Hamlets are able to colonize new areas because their pelagic larvae move throughout the water column. Hamlets spawn at dusk. There are a few hypotheses as to why this is, including that it limits predation on the embryos and that UV light from the sun cannot harm the embryos at the surface at night.

Hamlets are able to hybridize and mate with other species of hamlets, but this is very rare. They prefer to mate with fish of the same color morphs; however, they will mate with individuals of other hamlet species if it is their only option. Hamlets mate with the same partner for multiple years in a row.

== Taxonomy ==
Hypoplectrus providencianus is one of the 17 currently defined species of hamlets (genus Hypoplectrus) and was identified by Acero P. and Garzón-Ferreira in 1994.

Each species of hamlet is distinguished by its unique color pattern. H. unicolor was originally placed in the genus Perca. H. puella, H. chlorurus, and H. unicolor were reclassified into the genus Plectropoma in 1828. They were categorized under their own genus, Hypoplectrus, in 1861 after the discovery and description of H. indigo, H. gummigutta, H. nigricans, and H. guttavarius.

There are many genetic similarities between each species of hamlet because they recently diverged (split into distinct species). Each species generally has its own distribution, but a geographic barrier is not the likely cause of the speciation of hamlets. Rather, evidence suggests that the hamlets diverged because of competition between different morphotypes for resources, food, etc.; ecological roles, specifically in habitats; and preference for mating with fish of similar color-morphs.
