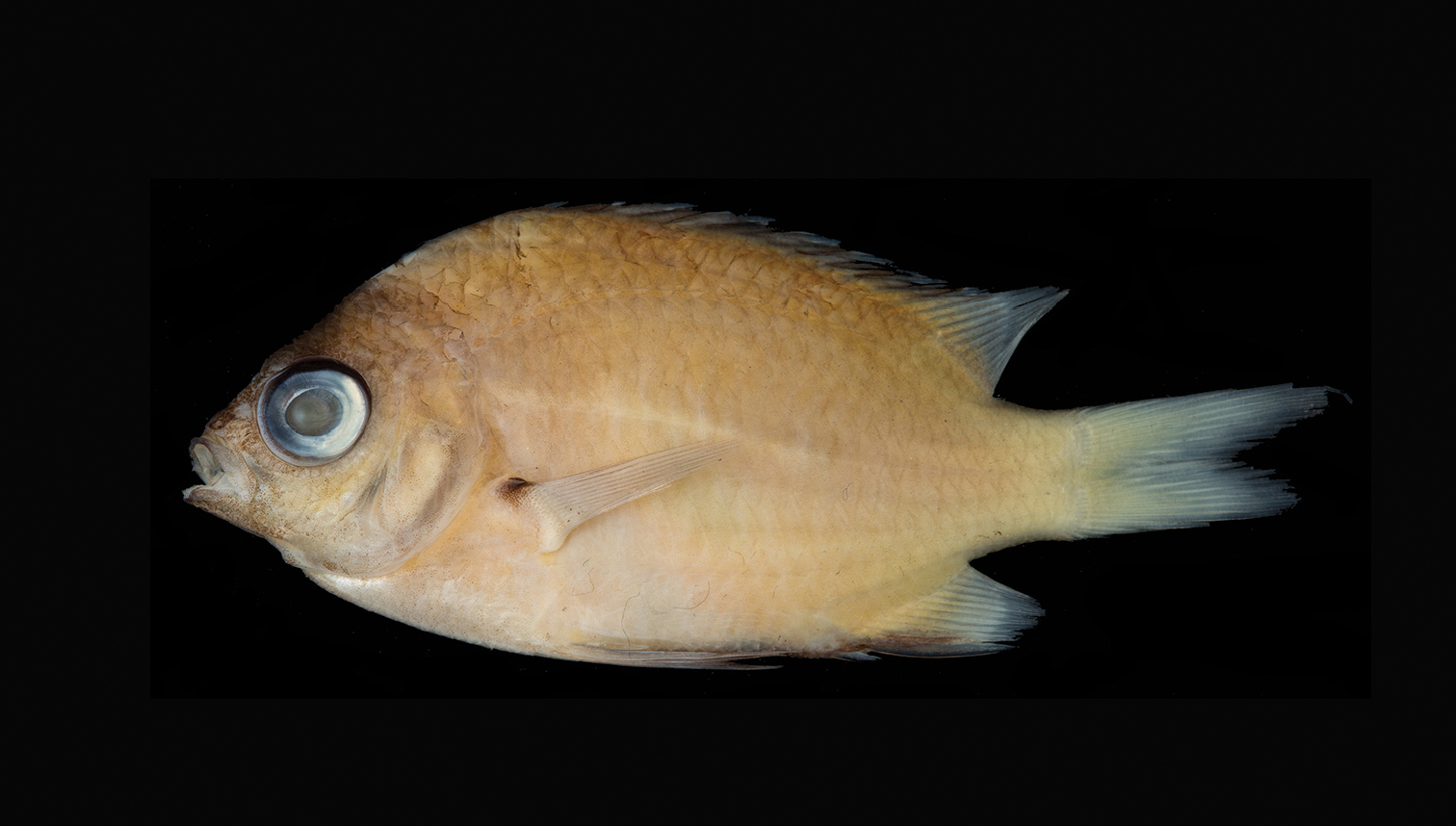

Conservation status
- Least Concern (IUCN 3.1)

Scientific classification
- Kingdom: Animalia
- Phylum: Chordata
- Class: Actinopterygii
- Order: Blenniiformes
- Family: Pomacentridae
- Genus: Azurina
- Species: C. hangganan

Binomial name
- Chromis hangganan Arango, Pinheiro, Rocha, Greene, Pyle, Copus, Shepherd & C. R. Rocha, 2019

= Chromis hangganan =

Species of fish

Chromis hangganan, the dark margin chromis, is a species of marine fish of the damselfishes in the family Pomacentridae belonging to the genus Chromis. This species was first described in 2019, along with Chromis bowesi and Chromis gunting, discovered and known only from Lubang Island, in the Philippines. It is characterized by 10–12 dorsal fin rays, 11–12 anal fin rays, 18 pectoral fin rays, 3 caudal fin rays that are procurrent, 16 lateral line scales that are tubed, 23–26 gill rakers, and a body depth of 1.9–2.0 in standard length(5.78 cm in length) as differed from other congeners. The adult fish's color when fresh is yellowish having dark black margins on the dorsal and anal fins.

== Distribution and habitat ==
Chromis hangganan was particularly only found at Lubang Island, Oriental Mindoro. All three species, C. bowesi, C. gunting and C. hangganan comes from Philippines, and collected at a depth of about 75–150 m, with C. hangganan at 90–130 m.

== Description ==
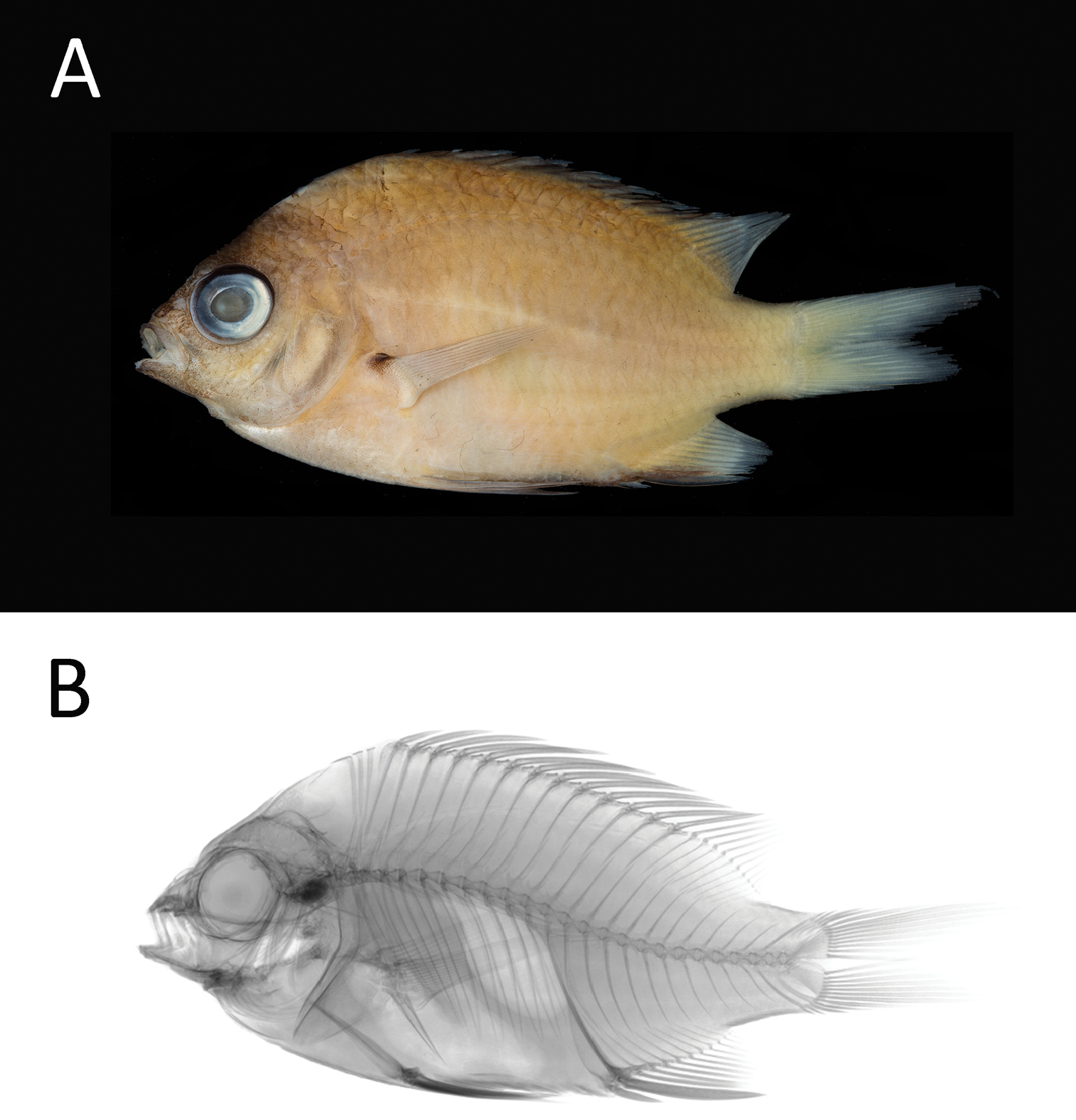
C. hangganan

The largest specimen used to describe C. hangganan has a size of about 5.7 cm. Images of fresh specimens are not captured. According to the authors, C. hangganan has a brown body; the upper body is darker brown than the lower body; its tail and caudal fins are pale yellow in particular. There are also black edges along the dorsal and anal fin spines. Soft dorsal fin and anal fin have yellow rays. The mouth, snout and nape, and the area around the eyes are dark brown. The lower part of the head is light brown. There are also dark spots on the pectoral fin base.

== Etymology ==
The scientific nomenclature uses the word hangganan which means border in Tagalog, the specific epithet was in reference to the black margins along the dorsal and anal fins or referring to the appearance of the fish's fin margins or borders.
