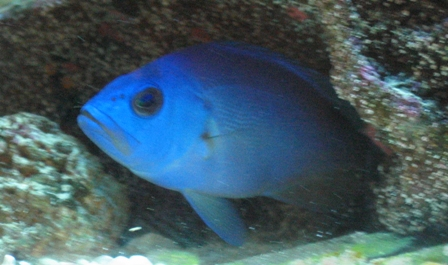

Conservation status
- Least Concern (IUCN 3.1)

Scientific classification
- Kingdom: Animalia
- Phylum: Chordata
- Class: Actinopterygii
- Order: Perciformes
- Family: Serranidae
- Genus: Hypoplectrus
- Species: H. gemma

Binomial name
- Hypoplectrus gemma Goode and T.H. Bean, 1882

= Hypoplectrus gemma =

Species of fish

Hypoplectrus gemma, the blue hamlet, is a species of marine ray-finned fish, a sea bass from the subfamily Serraninae which is part of the family Serranidae, which also includes the groupers and anthias. It is found in the western Atlantic Ocean and occasionally makes its way into the aquarium trade.

== Description ==
Hypoplectrus gemma has a deep body which is markedly compressed laterally. It has a straight forehead and a rather short snout which has a protrusible top jaw The preoperculum is angular and has serrations along its edges and a number of small spines which point to the head on its lower edge close to the angle. The dorsal fin has ten spines and 14-17 soft rays and is continuous. It has long pelvic fins which extend as far as, or beyond the anus. The caudal fin is slightly forked. The head, body and fins of this species are plain iridescent blue and there is a black stripe on the upper and lower edges of the caudal fin. This species has a maximum recorded length of 13 centimetres (5.1 in), although the method of fish measurement used was not given.

== Distribution ==
Hypoplectrus gemma is found in the western Atlantic Ocean. It was considered to be endemic to Florida but it has since been discovered off the Yucatan Peninsula in Mexico, It has also been found in the Dutch West Indies off the island of Bonaire. It has also been recorded on the northern Bahamas and in Cuba.

== Habitat and biology ==
Hypoplectrus gemma is found on shallow reefs, at depths of 3 to 20 metres (9.8 to 65.6 ft). The species in the genus Hypoplectrus are synchronous hermaphrodites and they have the ability to move between "male" and "female" roles when spawning. The colour pattern of this species resembles that of the blue chromis (Chromis cyanea) and it has been suggested that the blue hamlet mimics the blue chromis. The resemblance between the two species is enhanced by the more elongate body shape and deeply forked tail of H. gemma compared to its congeners. The purpose of this mimicry may be to allow H. gemma to prey on the young of the blue chromis but this has yet to be proven. This is a carnivorous species which feeds on other fishes and non-sessile benthic crustaceans.

== Taxonomy ==
Hypoplectrus gemma was first formally described in 1882 by the American ichthyologists George Brown Goode (1851-1896) and Tarleton Hoffman Bean (1846-1916) with the type locality given as Garden Key in the Dry Tortugas of Florida.

== Utilisation ==
Hypoplectrus gemma is used in the aquarium trade but whether it is rare or common in that trade is unclear.
