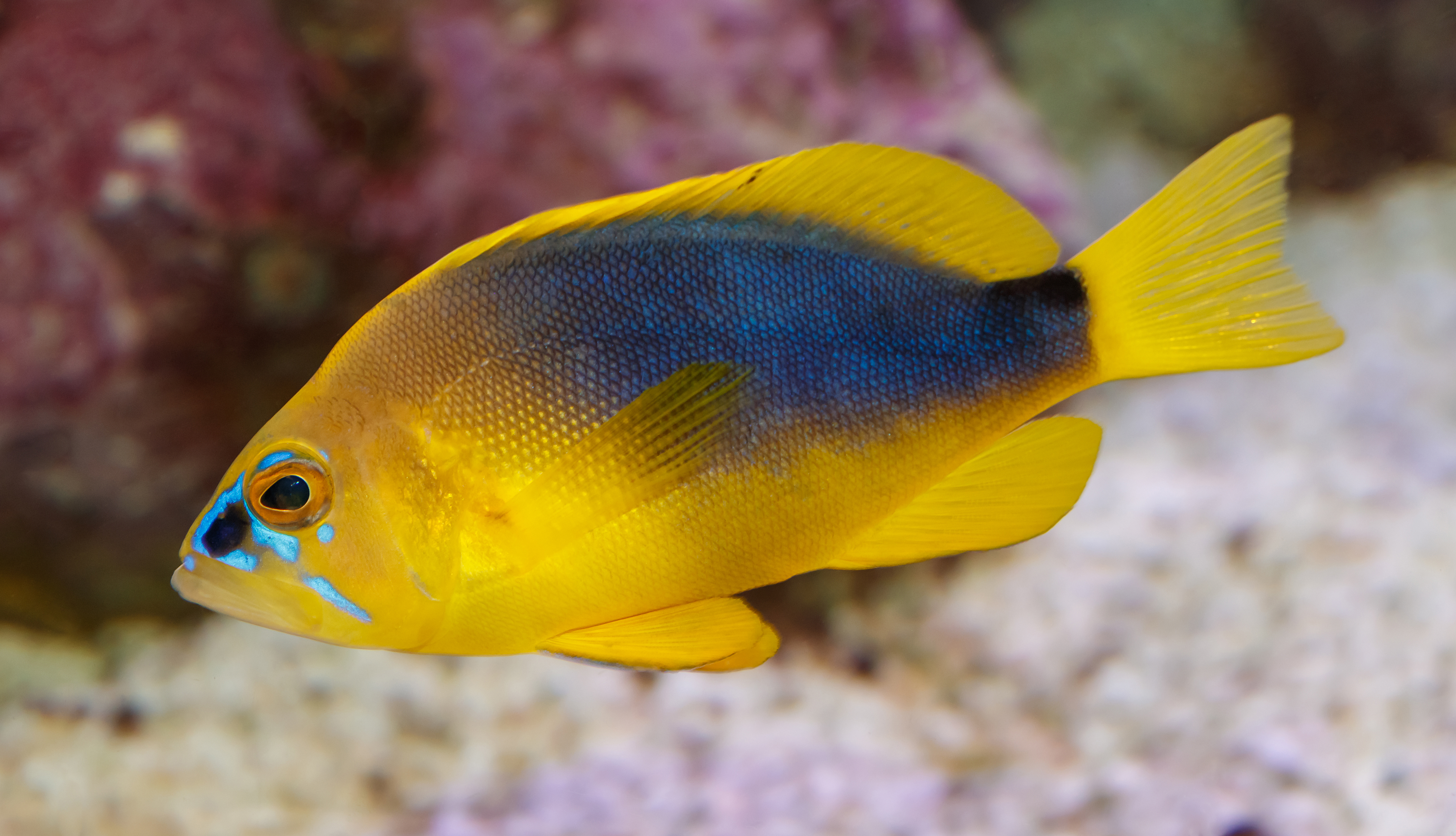

Conservation status
- Least Concern (IUCN 3.1)

Scientific classification
- Kingdom: Animalia
- Phylum: Chordata
- Class: Actinopterygii
- Order: Perciformes
- Family: Serranidae
- Genus: Hypoplectrus
- Species: H. guttavarius

Binomial name
- Hypoplectrus guttavarius (Poey, 1852)

Synonyms
- Plectropoma guttavarium Poey, 1852; Hypoplectrus guttavarium (Poey, 1852); Plectropoma accensum Poey, 1852; Hypoplectrus accensus (Poey, 1852); Hypoplectrus pinnivaria Poey, 1868

= Shy hamlet =

Species of fish

The shy hamlet (Hypoplectrus guttavarius) is a small Western Atlantic serranid fish, which belongs to the subclass perciformes in the class Actinopterygii (ray-finned fishes). To this date, seventeen species of the genus Hypoplectrus have been recognized, a third of which have been discovered in the past few years.

They are synchronous hermaphrodites; ecologically and morphologically, all are remarkably similar in major features except for their color pattern which is how they are differentiated into different species.

The name is derived from its personality because they are a solitary species that travel in pairs. They are mostly found in the Western Atlantic Ocean on Caribbean inshore areas in low depths (3–30 m or 10–100 ft) and in temperatures of about 22–27 °C (72–81 °F). Their habitat is rocks and corals. Hamlets are small and bright colored, specifically, shy hamlets have a yellow head and fins followed by a brown-black body. In addition, there are bright blue stripes around the eye and on the snout. They are carnivores and mostly feed on crustaceans such as shrimp, clam, squid etc. as well as other bony fish.

Shy hamlets were first formally described as Plectropoma guttavarium in 1852 by the Cuban zoologist Felipe Poey (1799–1891) with Havana given as the type of locality.

== Description ==
Hamlets are small and bright colored. Shy hamlets have a yellow head with a brown-black body. However, the extent of the two-color portions can vary, and they are divided by a diagonal line extending from the nape posteriorly and ventrally to the anal fin. The face and all the fins are yellow. On the head it has a bright blue streak around the eye and on the snout. In addition, they can grow up to a maximum size of 13 cm (5.1 in) in length.

In the past, researchers described hamlets as members of single species called H. unicolor. However, more recent work has suggested that several of those species are likely within the same group. Until today, opinions of scientists remain divided concerning these two hypotheses and have been described as the "Hamlet Problem" by the American ecologist Ron Thresher. The only character, thus far, found to be different and specific to each species is coloration and geographic distribution. In fact, studies have found that mating hamlets produce a unique sound while gametes are dispersed which might help to synchronize spawning. They also produce a low amplitude pre-mating sound, which have been hypothesized to be characteristic to different hamlet species, although it has not been statistically validated. More recent work has suggested that there is some small degree of genetic isolation between geographically separated species, although it is not an absolute pattern.

== Distribution and habitat ==
The shy hamlet inhabits the tropical Caribbean seas. The fish is primarily pelagic and can be found on inshore areas in low depths (3–30 m or 10–100 ft) and in temperatures of about 22–27 °C (72–81 °F). They are coral reef fishes that vary in their distribution but tend to be highly sympatric, with up to nine species found on a single reef.

In a study of the distribution of hamlets in the Greater Caribbean region using cluster and nMDS analyses, where hamlets were divided into three major groups: widespread, less widespread, where the shy hamlets belong to and geographically confined or segregated.

== Reproduction ==
Shy hamlets are simultaneous hermaphrodites, meaning they possess both female and male reproductive systems. Observational studies have shown that hamlets mate only in pairs, with external fertilization and planktonic zygotes. They display stronger mating preference for species of the same color pattern. However, there has been occasional mixed matings and hybrids, where the offspring have mixed coloration.

Mating usually occurs right before sunset and continues for a small period after sunset. They purposely choose a spawning location above a tall reef structure allowing them to mate relatively high in the water column. This serves the purpose of placing the free-floating eggs in a location with higher chance to be carried away by the current to avoid being preyed upon by predators roaming the sea floor.

During mating, once the proper height is attained, shy hamlets take turns fertilizing each other's eggs by wrapping themselves around each other and vigorously shaking, releasing eggs and sperm into the water column.

Shy hamlets continue to reproduce even upon disruptions, by trying to mate more frequently in the same period of spawning or by continuing to go even later past sunset to ensure fertilization of eggs. Sometimes when disturbed by predators, shy hamlets spawn lower, closer to the seafloor to hide themselves.

== Diet ==
Shy hamlets are reef-associated carnivorous predatory fishes. While little is known about what the shy hamlet specifically eats, other species of hamlets have been known to feed on smaller fish, crustaceans, and shrimp. For crustaceans, hamlets have been known to eat mysid shrimp, crabs, and mantis shrimps. Hamlets have also been observed to eat fish such as Chromis cyanea.
