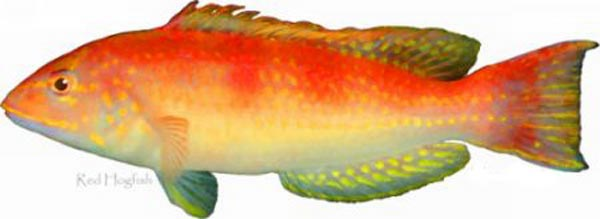

Conservation status
- Least Concern (IUCN 3.1)

Scientific classification
- Kingdom: Animalia
- Phylum: Chordata
- Class: Actinopterygii
- Order: Labriformes
- Family: Labridae
- Genus: Decodon
- Species: D. puellaris

Binomial name
- Decodon puellaris (Poey, 1860)

Synonyms
- Cossyphus puellaris Poey, 1860

= Decodon puellaris =

Species of fish

Decodon puellaris, the red hogfish, is a species of marine ray-finned fish from the family Labridae, the wrasses, from the western Atlantic Ocean.

== Taxonomy ==
Decodon puellaris was described in 1860 as Cossyphus puellaris by the Cuban zoologist Felipe Poey with the type locality given as Havana. In 1861 the British-German ichthyologist Albert Günther created the genus Decodon and designated Cossyphus puellaris as its type species.

== Distribution ==
Decodon puellaris is ranges from Cape Fear in North Carolina southwards along the Atlantic coast of the United States and around Bermuda. They are found in the Bahamas, through the Gulf of Mexico and Caribbean Sea the range continuing south along the coats of South America as far as Rio Grande do Sul in Brazil.

== Description ==
Decodon puellaris has an elongated, laterally compressed body with a thick-lipped, protrusible mouth. The adults have 4 front teeth in upper jaw and 2 in lower which are protruding. The dorsal fin has a smooth profile without any noticeable notch, there are ten dorsal fin spines and 9-10 soft rays. The anal fin has 3 spines and 10 rays. It has an unbroken, arched lateral line which has 27-29 scales along it.

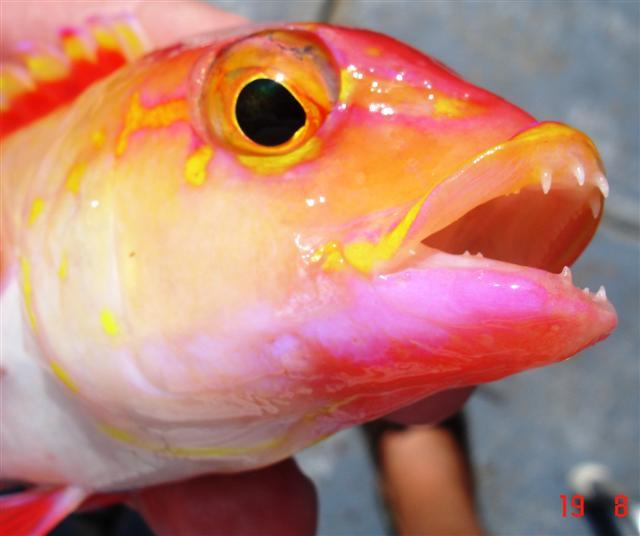
Showing teeth.

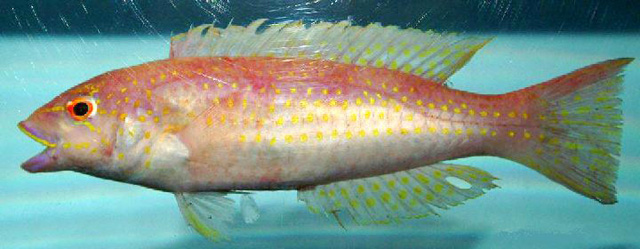
With fins extended

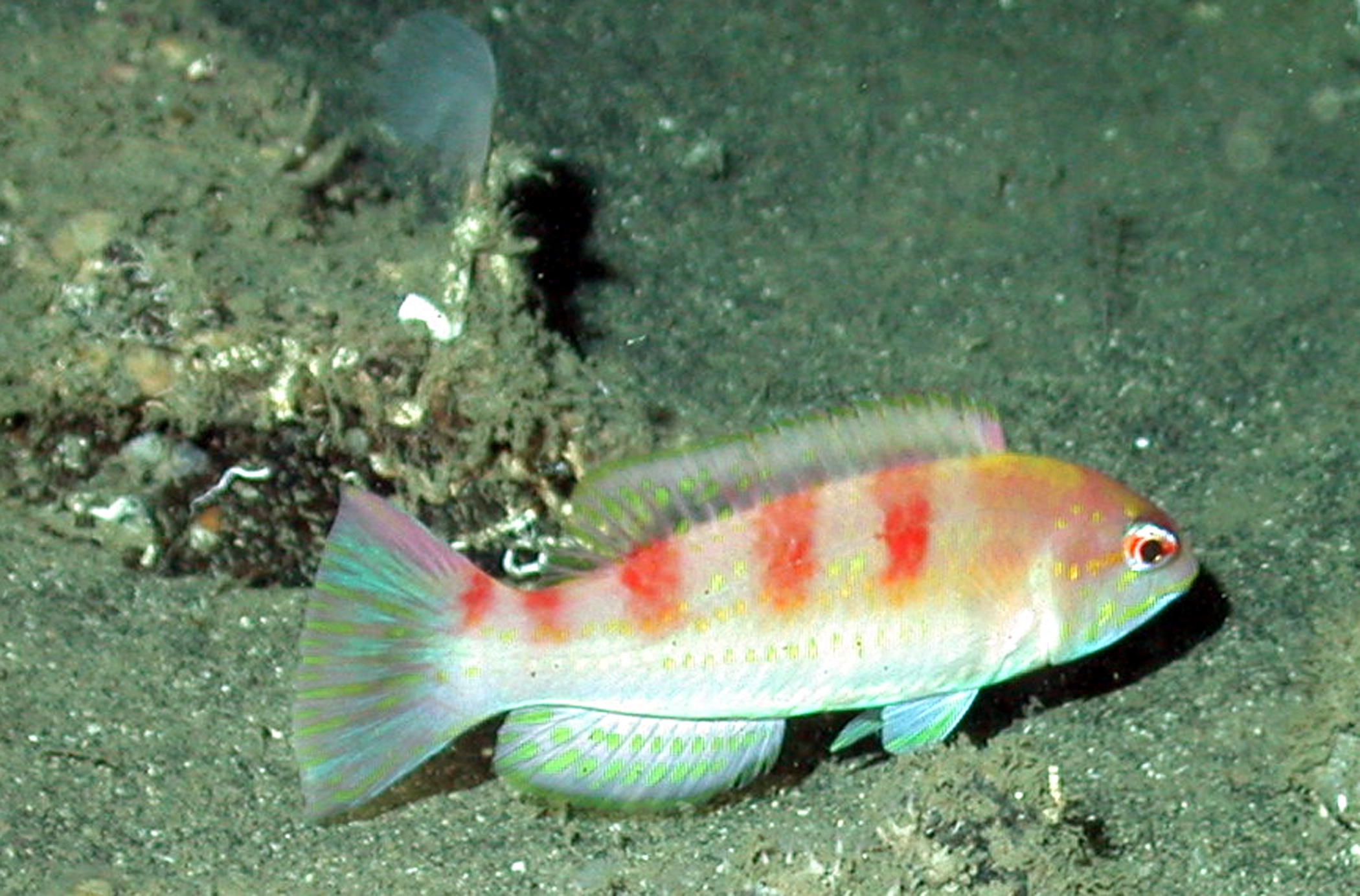
In the Atlantic Ocean, Southeast U.S. shelf

The adults are red in colour above and whitish below and has three yellow stripes in their heads, along the top lip, one from the lower margin of the eye to the lower gill cover and the other from the snout, running through the eye to the top of the gill cover. There are lines of yellow on the body formed by spots on the scales of the body, as are the lines along the bases of the dorsal and anal fins. The caudal fin has its upper and outer margins coloured yellow. The juveniles are red with a large black eye spot in the centre of the last few spines in the dorsal fin and a small black spot on the top of the caudal peduncle. It can grow to 30 centimetres (12 in) in total length.

== Habitat and biology ==
Decodon puellaris prefers rock substrates and is associated with islands. It occurs at depths of between 18 and 275 metres (59 and 902 ft)> This species is a carnivore and its diet consists of mobile benthic worms, molluscs and bony fish. The eggs and larvae of the red hogfish are pelagic.

== Human use ==
Red hogfish are collected for eating by humans but the extent of this and its affects on local populations are not known.
