= Decodon =

Decodon may refer to:

- Decodon (fish), a fish genus in the family Labridae
- Decodon (plant), a plant genus in the family Lythraceae
