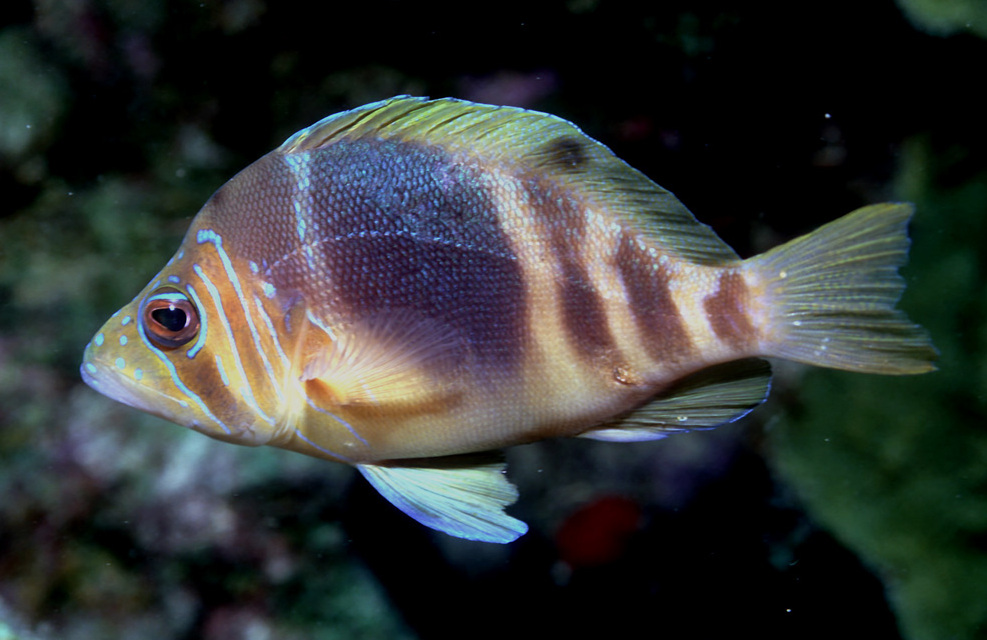
- Hypoplectrus puella

Scientific classification
- Kingdom: Animalia
- Phylum: Chordata
- Class: Actinopterygii
- Order: Perciformes
- Family: Serranidae
- Genus: Hypoplectrus; T. N. Gill, 1861

Type species
- Plectropoma puella Cuvier, 1828

Species
- see text

= Hypoplectrus =

Genus of fishes

Hypoplectrus is a genus of fishes commonly known as hamlets, found mainly in coral reefs in the Caribbean Sea and the Gulf of Mexico, particularly around Florida and the Bahamas. They are a popular choice for hobbyist saltwater aquariums, and come in a variety of colors.

== Reproduction ==
Hamlets are simultaneous hermaphrodites (or synchronous hermaphrodites): They have both male and female sexual organs at the same time as an adult, meaning that they function as a male and female, making them one of the few vertebrates that are male and female at the same time. They seem quite at ease mating in front of divers, allowing observations in the wild to occur readily. They do not practice self-fertilization, but when they find a mate, the pair takes turns between which one acts as the male and which acts as the female through multiple matings, usually over the course of several nights. Hamlets preferentially mate with individuals of their same color pattern.

== Species ==
There are currently 20 recognized species in this genus:

| Species | Common name | Image |
|---|---|---|
| Hypoplectrus aberrans Poey, 1868 | Yellowbelly hamlet | |
| Hypoplectrus affinis (Poey, 1861) | Bluelip hamlet | |
| Hypoplectrus atlahua Tavera & Acero P, 2013 | Jarocho hamlet | |
| Hypoplectrus castroaguirrei Del-Moral-Flores, J. L. Tello-Musi & J. A. Martínez-Pérez, 2012 | | |
| Hypoplectrus chlorurus G. Cuvier, 1828 | Yellowtail hamlet | |
| Hypoplectrus ecosur Victor, 2012 | Spotted hamlet | |
| Hypoplectrus espinosai Puebla, Aguilar-Perera, Robertson & Domínguez-Domínguez, 2025 | | |
| Hypoplectrus floridae Victor, 2012 | Florida hamlet | |
| Hypoplectrus gemma Goode & T. H. Bean, 1882 | Blue hamlet | |
| Hypoplectrus gummigutta Poey, 1851 | Golden hamlet | |
| Hypoplectrus guttavarius Poey, 1852 | Shy hamlet | |
| Hypoplectrus indigo Poey, 1851 | Indigo hamlet | |
| Hypoplectrus liberte Victor & Marks 2018 | Striped hamlet | |
| Hypoplectrus maculiferus Poey, 1871 | | |
| Hypoplectrus maya Lobel, 2011 | Maya hamlet | |
| Hypoplectrus nigricans Poey, 1852 | Black hamlet | |
| Hypoplectrus providencianus Acero P & Garzón-Ferreira, 1994 | Masked hamlet | |
| Hypoplectrus puella G. Cuvier, 1828 | Barred hamlet | |
| Hypoplectrus randallorum Lobel, 2011 | Tan hamlet | |
| Hypoplectrus unicolor Walbaum, 1792 | Butter hamlet | |
