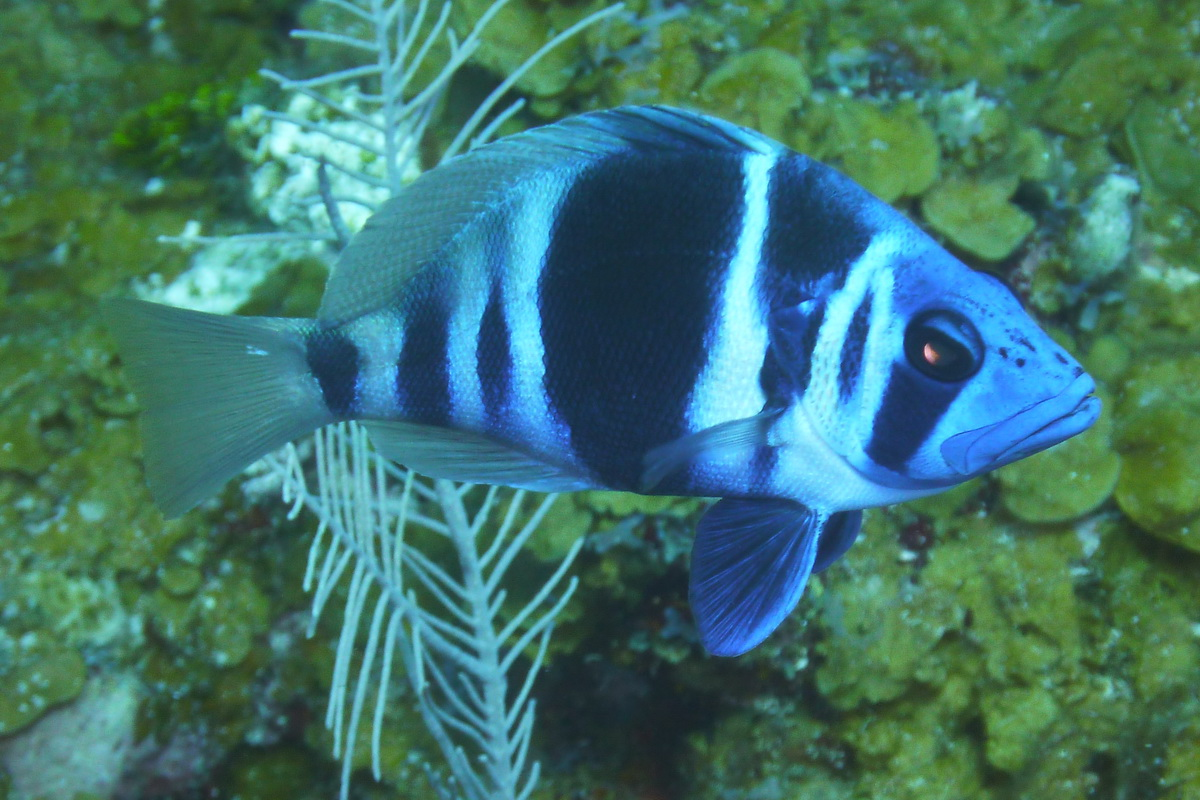

Conservation status
- Least Concern (IUCN 3.1)

Scientific classification
- Kingdom: Animalia
- Phylum: Chordata
- Class: Actinopterygii
- Order: Perciformes
- Family: Serranidae
- Genus: Hypoplectrus
- Species: H. indigo

Binomial name
- Hypoplectrus indigo (Poey, 1851)

Synonyms
- Plectropoma indigo Poey, 1851; Plectropoma bovinum Poey, 1852; Hypoplectrus bovinus (Poey, 1852)

= Hypoplectrus indigo =

Species of fish

Hypoplectrus indigo, the indigo hamlet, is a species of marine ray-finned fish, a sea bass from the family Serranidae. It is found in the central western Atlantic Ocean. It occasionally makes its way into the aquarium trade.

== Description ==
Hypoplectrus indigo has a deep body and head which is highly laterally compressed with a straight forehead and a rather short snout and a protrusible upper jaw. It has an angular preoperculum which has serrations on its edge and a number of small forward pointing spines on its lower margin close to the angle. The continuous dorsal fin has ten spines and 14-17 soft rays. It has long pelvic fins which extend as far as or beyond the anus. The caudal fin is slightly forked. The body and fins are dark blue and there is a pattern of seven dark blue-black vertical bars on the head and body. The details of the patterning and intensity of the blue background colour on the body and fins shows individual variation with some fish having barrow black stripes running along the upper and lower margins of the caudal fin. This species attains a maximum recorded total length of 14.3 centimetres (5.6 in).

== Distribution ==
Hypoplectrus indigo is found in the western Atlantic. Its ranges extends from the Bahamas in the north through the Gulf of Mexico along the Florida Keys and from Tuxpan in Mexico and the northern Yucatan Peninsula to northwestern Cuba. In the Caribbean Sea it has been recorded throughout the Antilles as far south as Tobago. It also occurs along the mainland coasts of Central and South America from Mexico to Mamitupo in Panama and among the offshore islands of Venezuela.

== Habitat and biology ==
Hypoplectrus indigo is a solitary species of coral reefs at depths of 3 to 45 metres (9.8 to 147.6 ft). The species in the genus Hypoplectrus are synchronous hermaphrodites and they have the ability to move between "male" and "female" roles when spawning. The colour pattern of this species bears a slight resemblance to that of the blue species in the genus Chromis and it has been suggested that the indigo hamlet is an aggressive mimic of either the blue chromis (C. cyaneus) or C. insolata. However, neither of the Chromis species really resembles H. indigo with its darker blue-black bars and other workers are not convinced by this hypothesis. These fish remain close to bottom and defend small territories on or near reefs. They are wary fish but can be curious, when approach they often retreat a short distance but then often return and approach stationary divers. This is a carnivorous species which feeds on other fishes and non-sessile benthic crustaceans.

== Taxonomy ==
Hypoplectrus indigo was first formally described as Plectropoma indigo in 1851 by the Cuban zoologist Felipe Poey (1799-1891) with Havana, Cuba given as the type locality.

== Utilisation ==
Hypoplectrus indigo is infrequently found in the aquarium trade. It is said to thrive when house appropriately.
