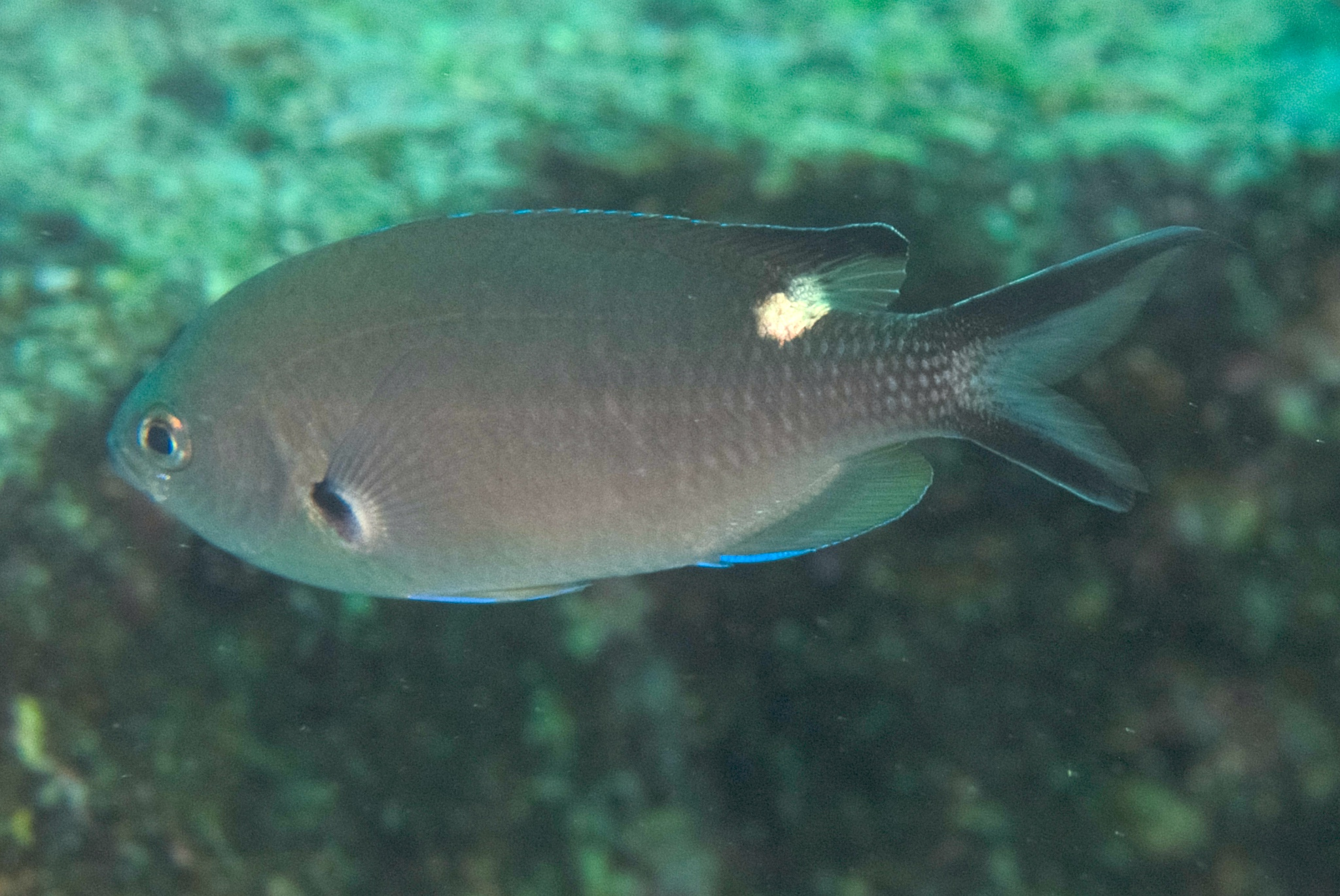

Conservation status
- Least Concern (IUCN 3.1)

Scientific classification
- Kingdom: Animalia
- Phylum: Chordata
- Class: Actinopterygii
- Order: Blenniiformes
- Family: Pomacentridae
- Genus: Azurina
- Species: A. atrilobata

Binomial name
- Azurina atrilobata (T. N. Gill, 1862)

Synonyms
- Chromis atrilobata Gill, 1862

= Azurina atrilobata =

Species of fish

Azurina atrilobata, commonly known as the scissortail damselfish, is a species of damselfish in the family Pomacentridae. It can be found in the eastern Pacific Ocean from the Gulf of California to northern Peru, including the Galapagos Islands and the Cocos Islands. It inhabits coral and rocky reefs. It aggregates in large numbers in open water above reefs. It feeds on zooplankton. It is not strongly territorial. In the darkness of deep water, it becomes invisible save for its post-dorsal white spot, giving the illusion of glowing in the dark. It is oviparous, and the males of the species guard and aerate the eggs.

== Gallery ==
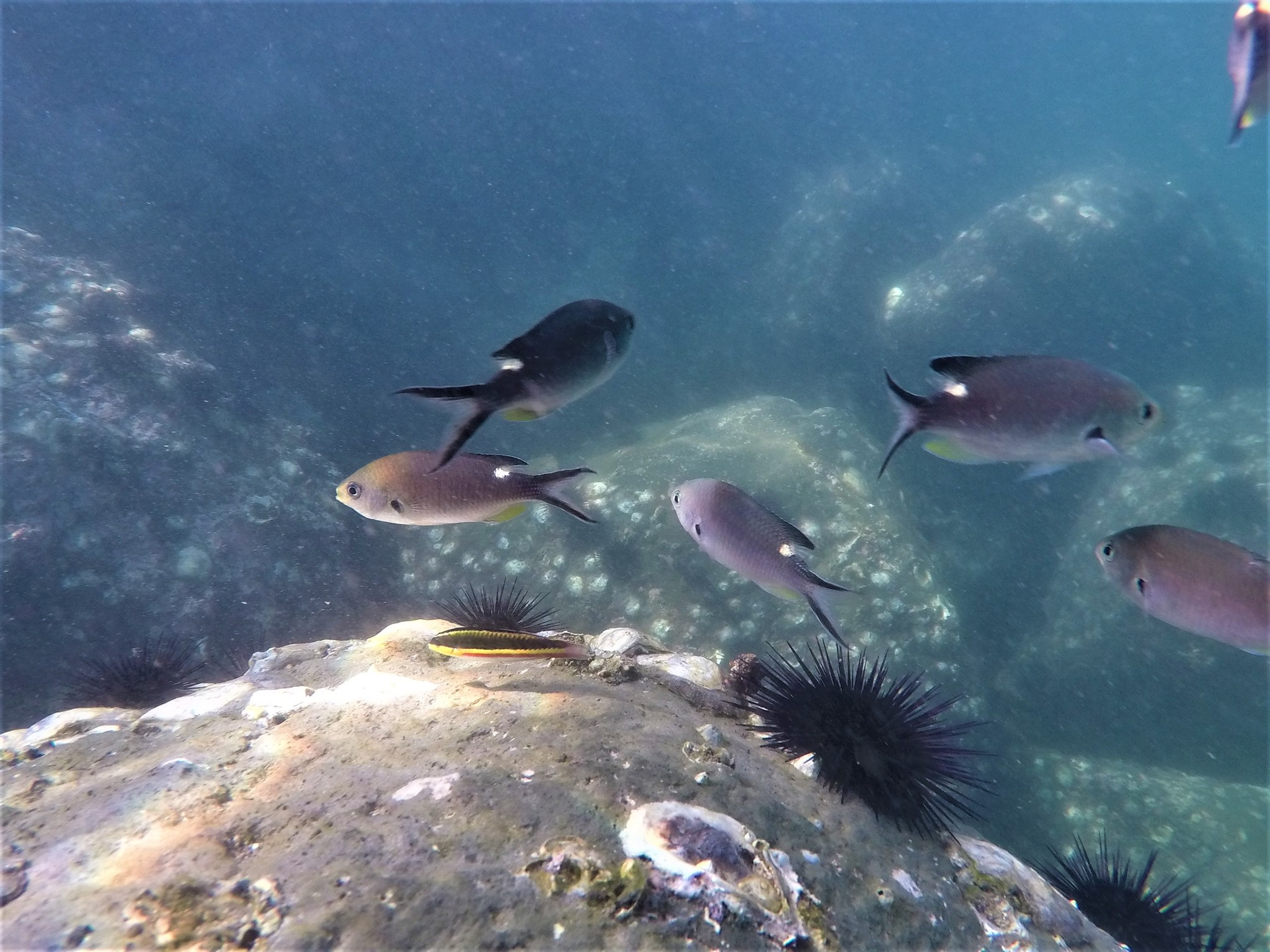
In Mexico

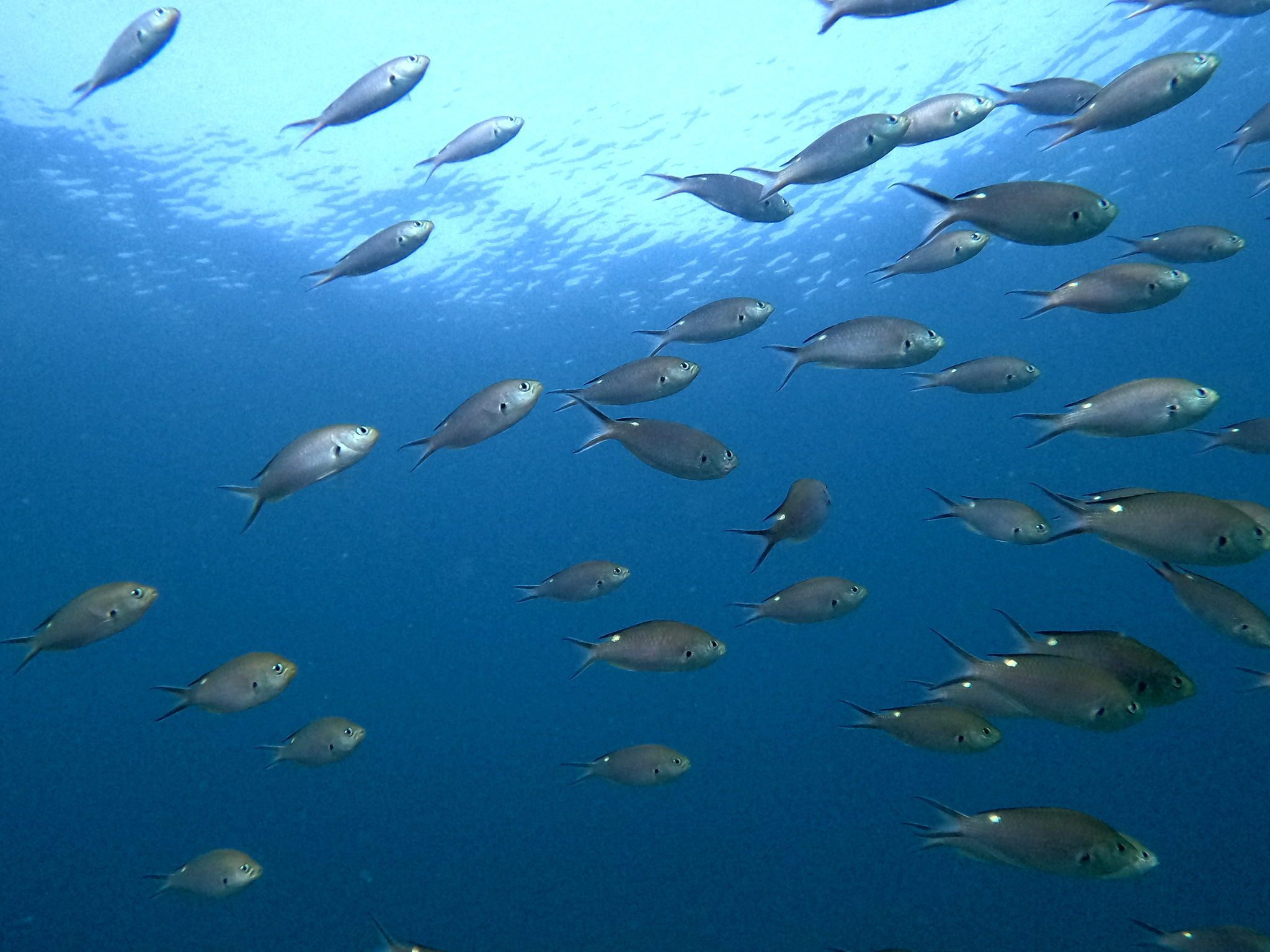
In Mexico

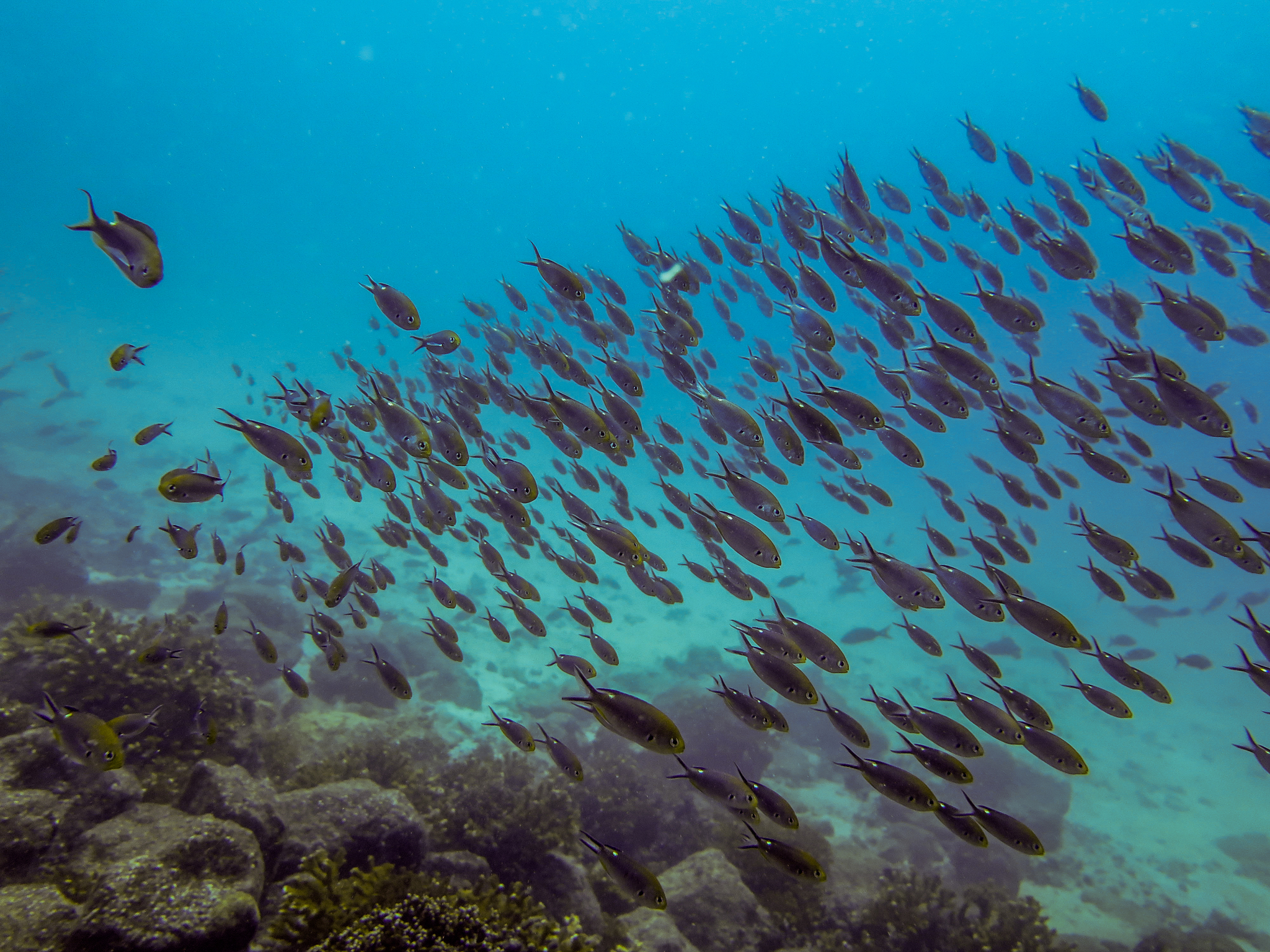
In Panama
