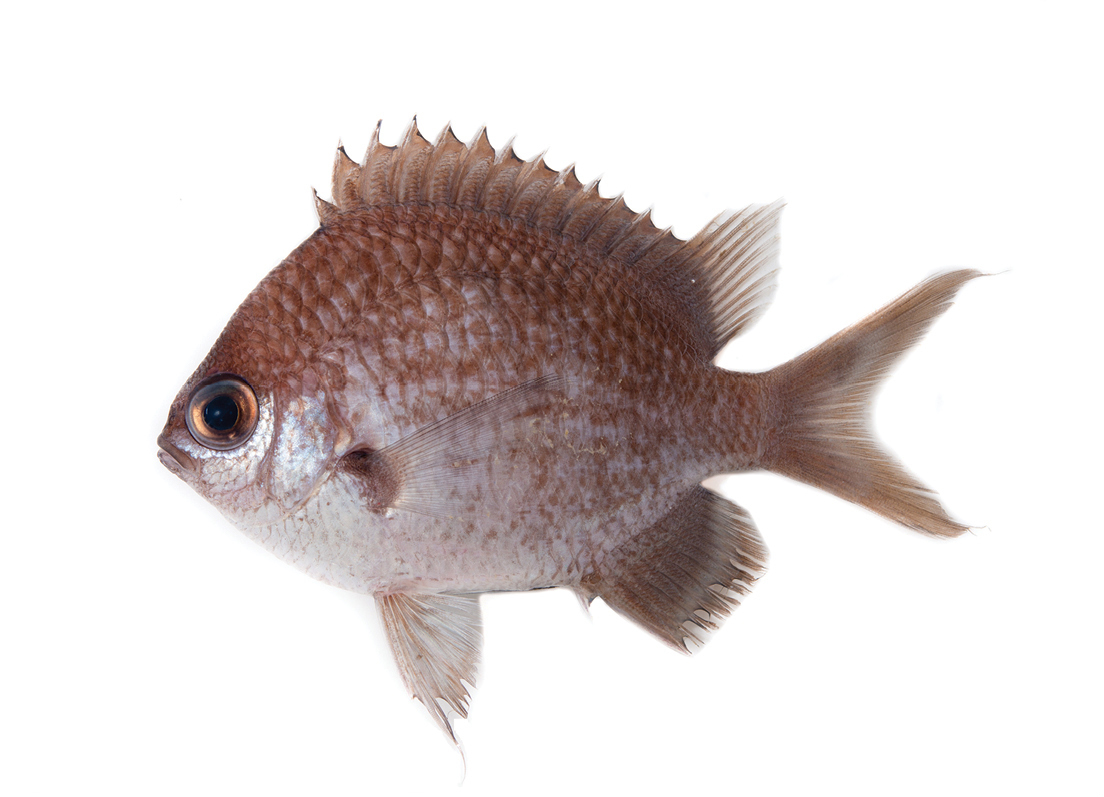

Conservation status
- Least Concern (IUCN 3.1)

Scientific classification
- Kingdom: Animalia
- Phylum: Chordata
- Class: Actinopterygii
- Order: Blenniiformes
- Family: Pomacentridae
- Genus: Chromis
- Species: C. bowesi

Binomial name
- Chromis bowesi Arango, Pinheiro, Rocha, Greene, Pyle, Copus, Shepherd & C. R. Rocha, 2019

= Chromis bowesi =

Species of fish

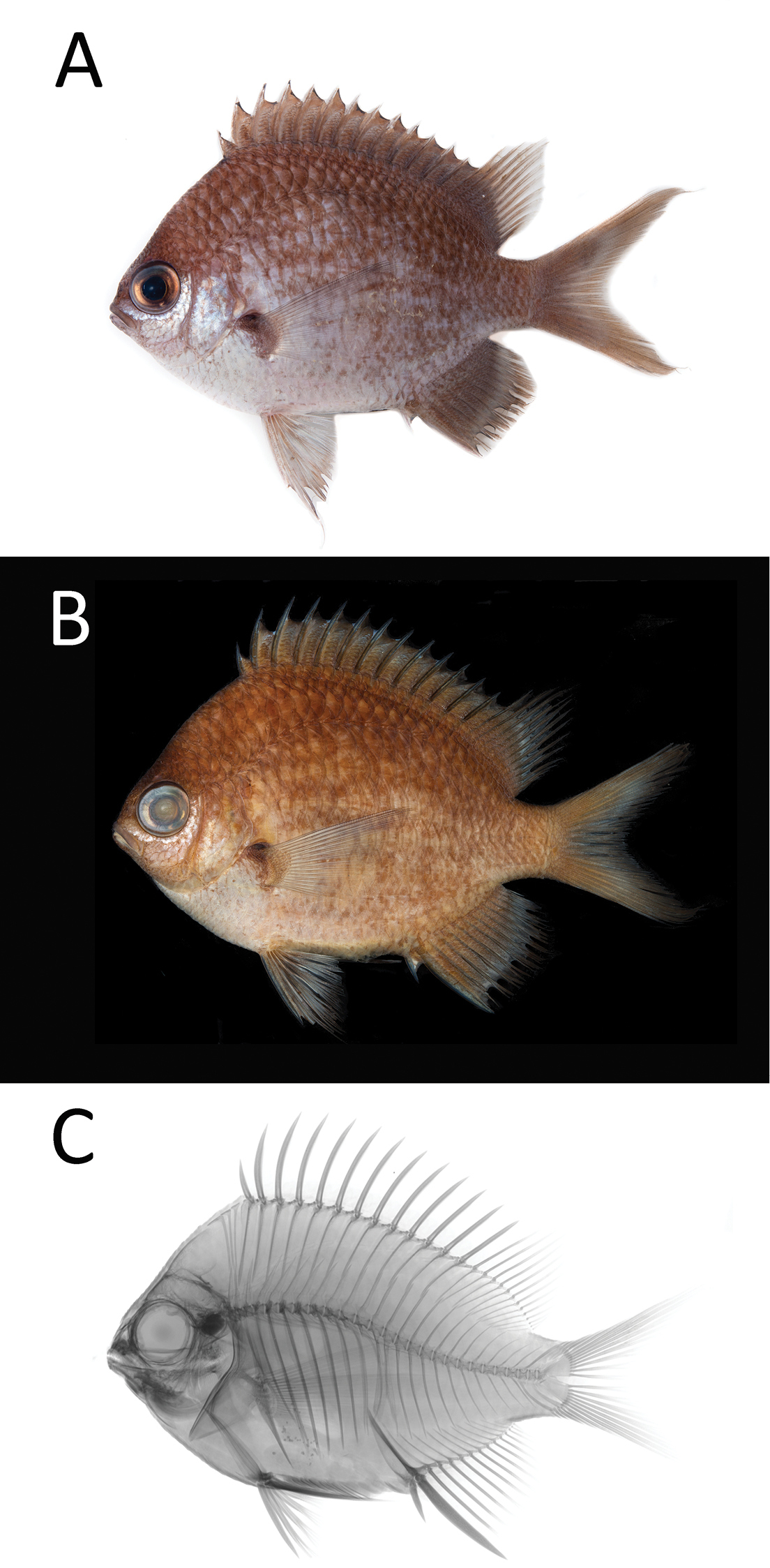
The holotype specimen directly after capture, as preserved, and radiographed

Chromis bowesi, the rhomboid chromis, is a species of damselfish in the family Pomacentridae. This species was first described in 2019 by Luiz A. Rocha and colleagues, along with Chromis hangganan and Chromis gunting, discovered and known from Verde Island, Batangas Bay and Puerto Galera Bay, in the Philippines.

== Etymology ==
The specific name bowesi was chosen in honor of the late William K. Bowes Jr. (1926 - 2016), who was the main sponsor of the Hope for Reefs initiative, from California Academy of Sciences.

== Description ==
The largest specimen used to describe C. bowesi is about 8.2 cm. In its natural habitat, C. bowesi has a bluish purple body with light blue stripes just behind the pectoral fins. Spines on dorsal and pelvic fins are light blue to almost white, with the soft dorsal fin transparent. The upper body is darker than the sides of the body and under the abdomen. The under-eye area is silvery white. Dark spots on the base of pectoral fins. Photographs of newly dead specimens are dark gray brown in the upper body, turning gray in the remaining body area.

The species is characterized by 11-12 dorsal fin rays, 11-13 anal fin rays, 17-19 pectoral fin rays, 3 caudal fin rays that are procurrent, 13-15 lateral line scales that are tubed, 25-27 gill rakers, and a body depth of 1.5-1.6 in standard length as differed from other congeners. The adult fish's color when fresh is brownish-grey in the dorsal side to whitish on the ventral side, with alternating dark and light stripes in the sides of body.

== Distribution and habitat ==
C. bowesi was particularly found in Verde Island Passage at Verde Island, in Batangas Bay and in Puerto Galera Bay. All three species, C. bowesi, C. gunting and C. hangganan comes from Philippines, and collected at a depth of about 75 – 150 m., with C. bowesi at 80 – 120 m.
