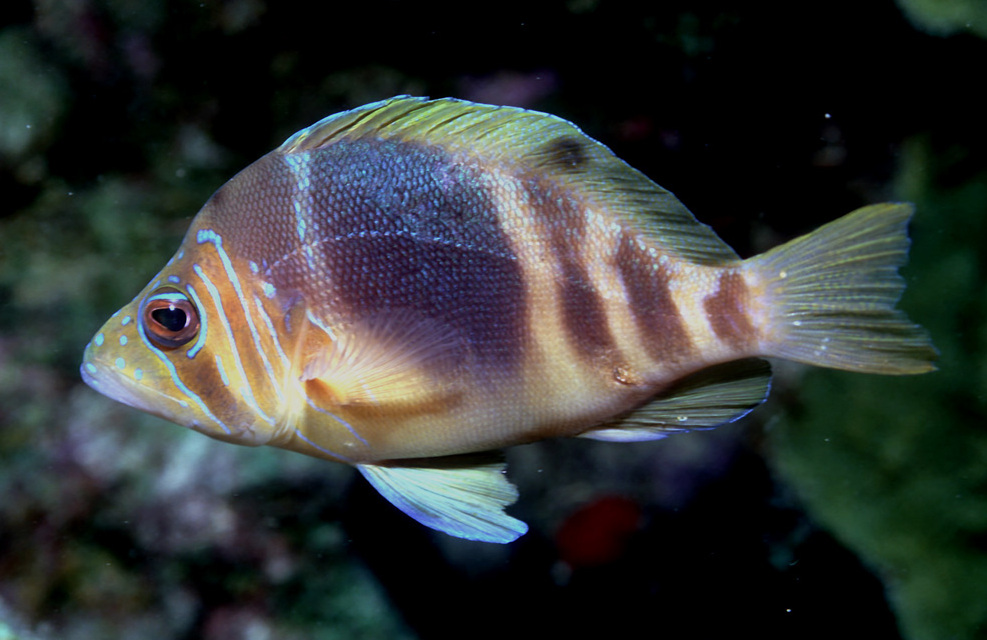

Conservation status
- Least Concern (IUCN 3.1)

Scientific classification
- Kingdom: Animalia
- Phylum: Chordata
- Class: Actinopterygii
- Order: Perciformes
- Family: Serranidae
- Genus: Hypoplectrus
- Species: H. puella

Binomial name
- Hypoplectrus puella (Cuvier, 1828)

Synonyms
- Plectropoma puella Cuvier, 1828; Plectropoma vitulinum Poey, 1852; Hypoplectrus vitulinus (Poey, 1852)

= Hypoplectrus puella =

Species of fish

Hypoplectrus puella, the barred hamlet is a species of marine ray-finned fish, a sea bass from the subfamily Serraninae which is part of the family Serranidae, which also includes the groupers and anthias. This species is from the Western Central Atlantic. It occasionally makes its way into the aquarium trade.

== Taxonomy ==
Hypoplectrus puella was first formally described in 1828 as Plectropoma puella by the French anatomist and naturalist Georges Cuvier (1769-1832) from a type collected at Martinique. In 2012 two new species of "barred hamlet", Hypoplectrus ecosur from the Yucatan and H. floridae from the eastern Gulf of Mexico, were described.

== Distribution ==
Hypoplectrus puella is found in the central western Atlantic Ocean and is the most numerous and widespread species in the genus Hypoplectrus. Its range extends from Bermuda south to the Florida Keys and the Bahamas, into the Gulf of Mexico and from Tuxpan in Mexico along the northern coast of the Yucatan Peninsula to northwestern Cuba, and the whole of the Caribbean Sea.

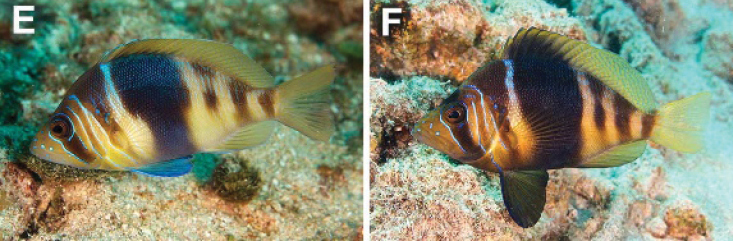
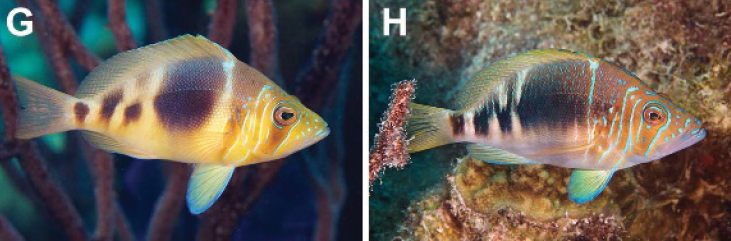
E: Roatán F: Bonaire G: Bonaire H: Southeast Florida

== Description ==
Hypoplectrus puella has a deep body and head which is highly laterally compressed with a straight forehead and a rather short snout and a protrusible upper jaw. It has an angular preoperculum which has serrations on its edge and a number of small forward pointing spines on its lower margin close to the angle. The continuous dorsal fin has ten spines and 14–17 soft rays. It has long pelvic fins which extend as far as or beyond the anus. The caudal fin is slightly forked.

This species has a pale yellowish to tan head and body which is marked with as many as 7 dark brown vertical bars which are variable in their number, darkness and length. They are predominant coloured browns and yellow, although some fishes show blue hues. Their large and noticeable pelvic fins vary in colour from yellow to dark bluish brown. They may also have thin, iridescent blue lines on the head and, rarely, these are also on the body.

This species attains a maximum published total length of 14.2 centimetres (5.6 in).

== Habitat and biology ==
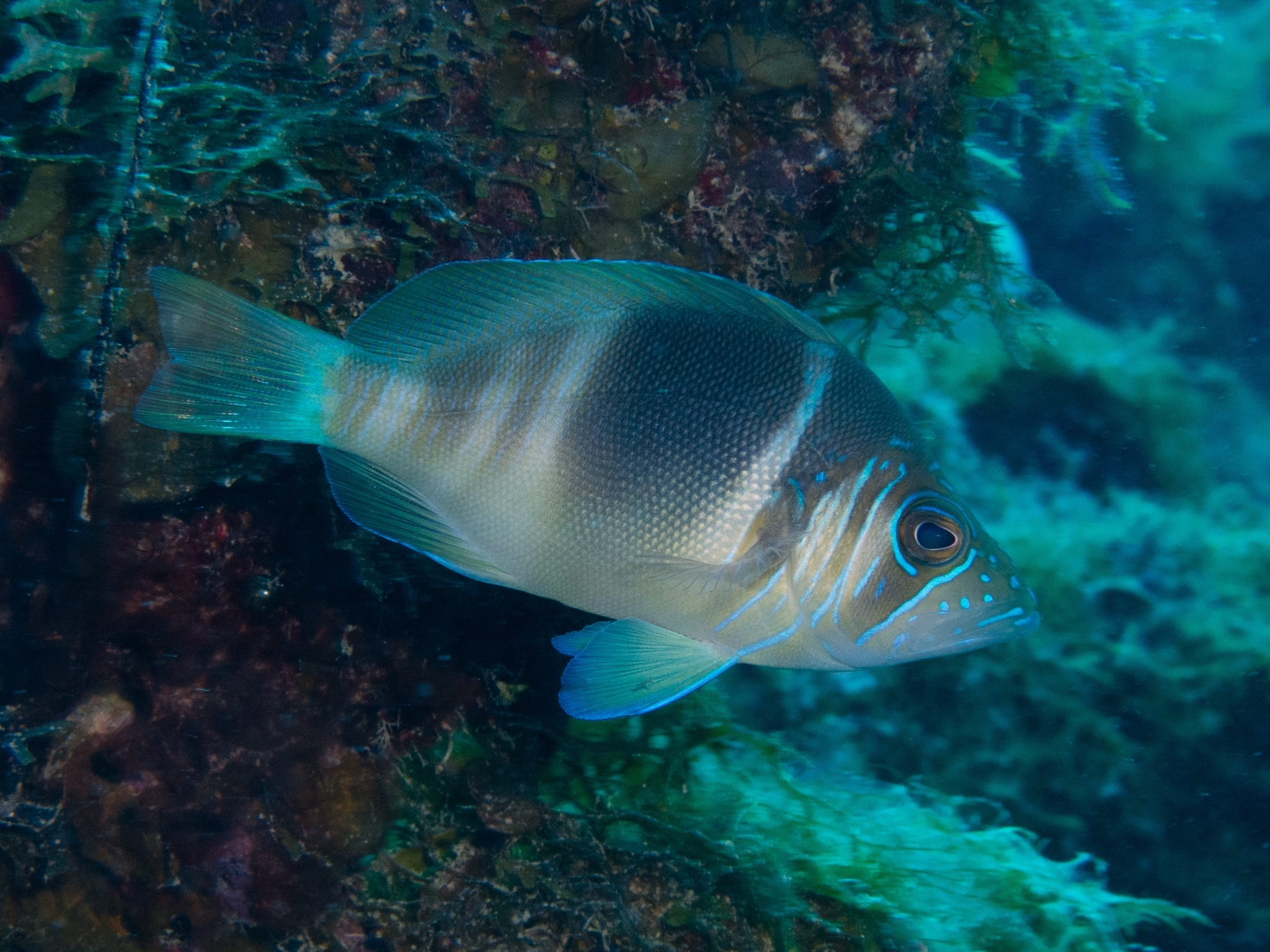
In Grand Cayman

Hypoplectrus puella is a solitary species which can be found over rocky or coral reefs close to hiding places. Unlike other species of hamlet this species may be found in turbid water. It is found at depths of between 3 and 90 metres (9.8 and 295.3 ft). The species in the genus Hypoplectrus are synchronous hermaphrodites and they have the ability to move between "male" and "female" roles when spawning. The juveniles are found in beds of sea grass.

In Panama this species has been observed following feeding schools of the striped parrotfish (Scarus iseri) taking advantage of the disturbance the parrotfish school causes to prey species as they forage across the substrate, disturbing and grazing on the algal gardens of territorial damselfishes. Individuals of H. puella which associate with schools of parrotfish are much more successful in catching prey than solitarily hunting individuals. It has been proposed that the hamlet is a mimic of the some species of parrot fish but the resemblance is more in the similarity in colour but they are different in body shape.( This is a carnivorous species which feeds on other fishes and non-sessile benthic crustaceans. They are crepuscular, feeding mainly at dusk and sheltering in caves or crevices during the day.

== Utilisation ==
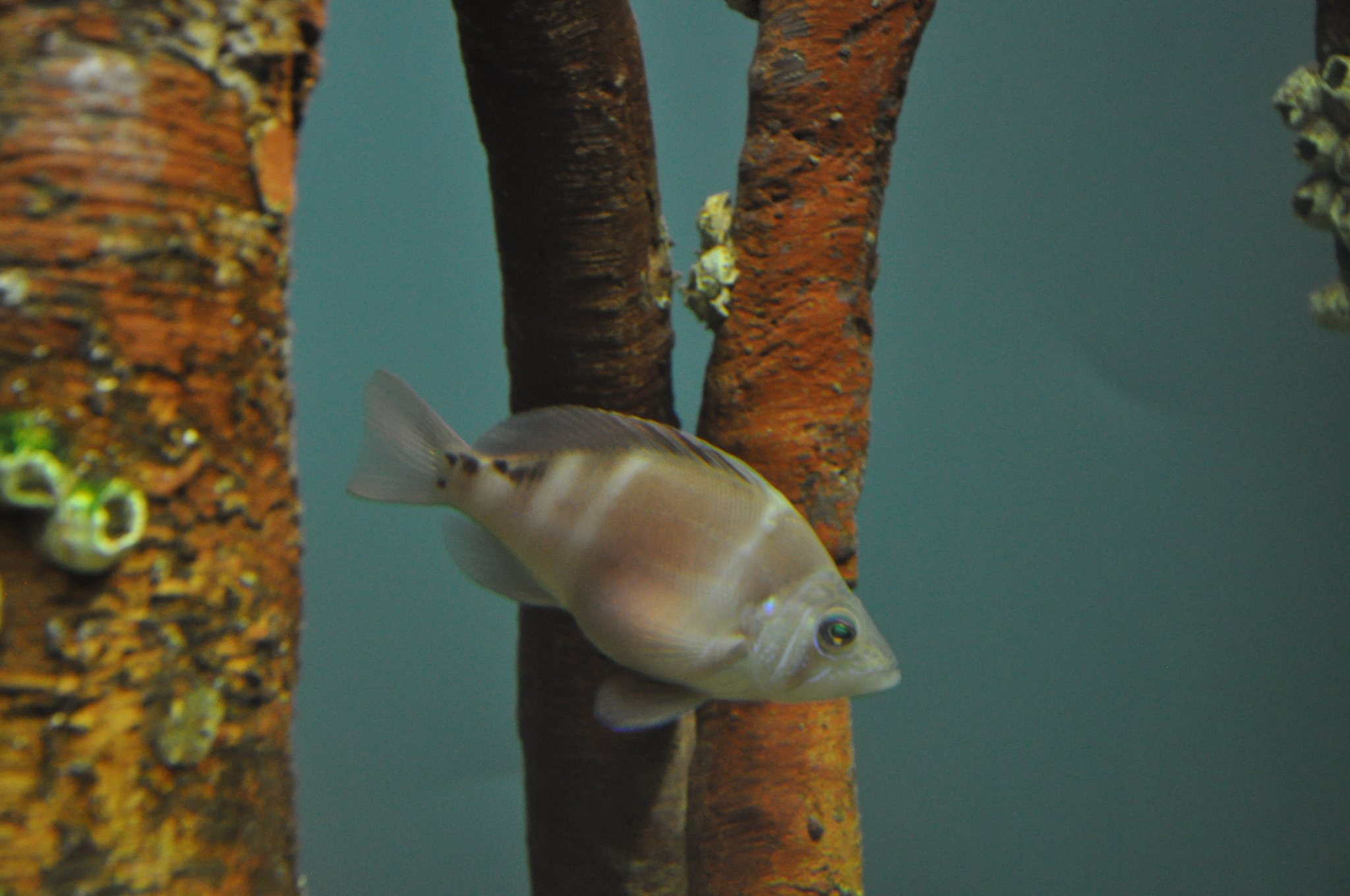
At Greensboro Science Center

Hypoplectrus puella is found in the aquarium trade and is bred in commercial breeding facilities.
