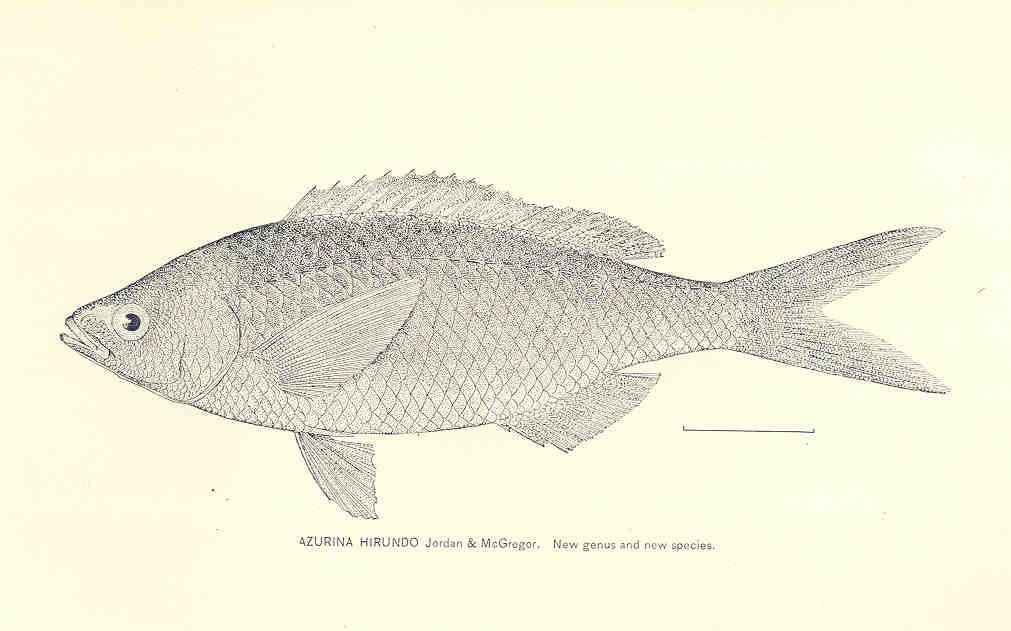

Conservation status
- Near Threatened (IUCN 3.1)

Scientific classification
- Kingdom: Animalia
- Phylum: Chordata
- Class: Actinopterygii
- Order: Blenniiformes
- Family: Pomacentridae
- Genus: Azurina
- Species: A. hirundo

Binomial name
- Azurina hirundo D.S. Jordan & McGregor, 1898

= Azurina hirundo =

Species of fish

Azurina hirundo, the swallow damsel is a species of ray-finned fish from the damselfish family Pomacentridae. It occurs on reefs in the eastern Pacific Ocean around Baja California, the Guadalupe Island and the Revillagigedo Islands.
