= Hypoplectrus gummigutta =

Conservation status
- Least Concern (IUCN 3.1)

Scientific classification
- Kingdom: Animalia
- Phylum: Chordata
- Class: Actinopterygii
- Division: Teleostei
- Order: Perciformes
- Family: Serranidae
- Genus: Hypoplectrus
- Species: H. gummigutta

Binomial name
- Hypoplectrus gummigutta (Poey, 1852)

Synonyms
- Plectropoma gummigutta Poey, 1852

Species of fish

Hypoplectrus gummigutta, commonly called the golden hamlet, is a species of marine ray-finned fish. They are sea bass from the subfamily Serraninae and the greater family Serranidae, which also includes the groupers and anthias. The golden hamlet was first described in 1852 by zoologist Felipe Poey (1799-1891) as Plectropoma gummigutta before being given its accepted name: Hypoplectrus gummigutta. It is found in the western Atlantic Ocean and occasionally makes its way into the aquarium trade.

== Description ==
The golden hamlet is morphologically similar to all other hamlets. It has a laterally compressed head with a short snout and a straight forehead. The single dorsal fin has 14–17 rays. It has long pelvic fins and a slightly forked caudal fin. The head, body, and fins are golden-yellow. On the head, there are typically one or more possibly large dark spots bordered by iridescent blue. Sometimes their back is colored grey. The species has a maximum recorded length of 13.2 centimeters (5.20 in).

== Distribution ==
Hamlets are tropical fish found only in the western Atlantic Ocean, specifically in the Caribbean, off the coast of Brazil, and in the Gulf of Mexico. H. gummigutta, however, does not have as wide of a distribution as the rest of its genus. In one study, they were shown to be one of the least widely distributed species of the genus. H. gummigutta were once thought to be absent from Mexico and rare in the Dominican Republic, though this has been disproven. Rather, they are rare in Puerto Rico and Mexico, but relatively common in the Dominican Republic. As a whole, they are rarely found east of the Mona Passage, which cuts across the space between Dominican Republic and Puerto Rico.

== Habitat ==
Hypoplectrus gummigutta are tropical coral reef fish not found outside the western Atlantic Ocean. They tend to stay close to the bottom and may hide in crevices when not swimming. Though similar in many ways to the other members of the Hypoplectrus genus, H. gummigutta differs in that they are found at greater depths than other hamlets, sometimes at more than 25 meters (82 ft).

== Diet ==
Golden hamlets are predatory carnivores with a diet similar to other hamlets, consisting of small reef-dwelling fishes and invertebrates. Crustaceans, such as shrimp and crabs, make up most of their diet.

== Reproduction ==
H. gummigutta, like the other members of the Hypoplectrus genus, are simultaneous hermaphrodites. They simultaneously have both male and female sex organs and produce both sperm and eggs. However, they do not self-fertilize, like some other simultaneous hermaphrodites. Instead, they mate by pairing with another H. gummigutta and switching between the male and female role. To initiate a mating, one hamlet assumes the female role and advertises its eggs, offering them up for fertilization in exchange for the chance to fertilize another's eggs. This phenomenon is known as egg-trading. The two hamlets alternate roles several times, releasing their eggs gradually to ensure reciprocal fertilization. This courtship is somewhat dance-like and lasts around an hour. Hamlets spawn daily in the late afternoon, just before sunset. H. gummigutta displays no parental care; fertilization is external and takes place after eggs are released into the water, where they disperse and grow into larvae. Larvae are planktonic.

Golden hamlets exhibit color-assortative mating, choosing to mate primarily with those of the same species, as demarcated by color pattern. Despite mating preference, no reproductive barrier exists between different species of hamlets mating. Hamlet hybridization is not common, but does occasionally occur, resulting in an offspring with a color pattern between those of its parents.

It has been hypothesized that hybridization of the golden and black hamlets generated the shy, yellowbelly, and yellowtail hamlets. However, there is currently no evidence for this, and it is considered very unlikely.
