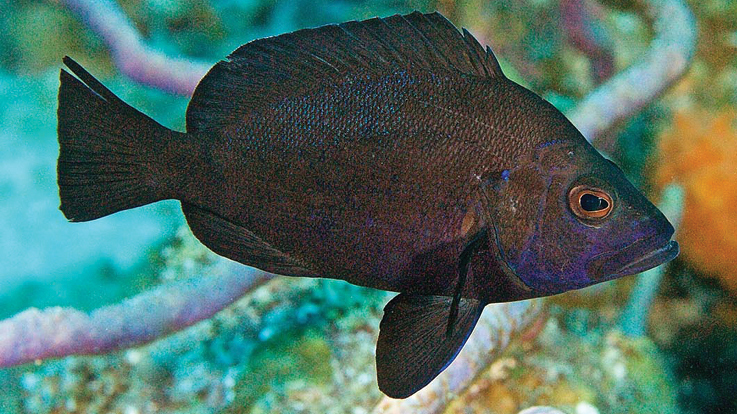
- In Grand Cayman

Conservation status
- Least Concern (IUCN 3.1)

Scientific classification
- Kingdom: Animalia
- Phylum: Chordata
- Class: Actinopterygii
- Division: Teleostei
- Order: Perciformes
- Family: Serranidae
- Genus: Hypoplectrus
- Species: H. nigricans

Binomial name
- Hypoplectrus nigricans (Poey, 1852)

Synonyms
- Plectropoma nigricans Poey, 1852

= Hypoplectrus nigricans =

Species of fish

Hypoplectrus nigricans, the black hamlet, is a species of marine ray-finned fish, a sea bass from the subfamily Serraninae which is part of the family Serranidae, which also includes the groupers and anthias. It is native to shallow parts of the central Western Atlantic Ocean and Caribbean Sea. It grows to about 15 cm (6 in) in total length. It is a simultaneous hermaphrodite, with a breeding strategy known as egg trading. One fish acts as a female and lays a batch of eggs which the other fertilises. The following night, the roles are reversed.

== Description ==
Hypoplectrus nigricans is a small fish growing to a total length of 85 to 150 mm (3.3 to 5.9 in). The morphology and colouring of the fish varies across its range. Fish from Puerto Rico have greyish bodies, translucent pectoral fins, pointed pelvic fins and a caudal fin shaped like a crescent moon. Fish from Mexico and Belize are slightly smaller and have a darker body colour with dark pectoral fins, blunt pelvic fins and a short, square-cut caudal fin.

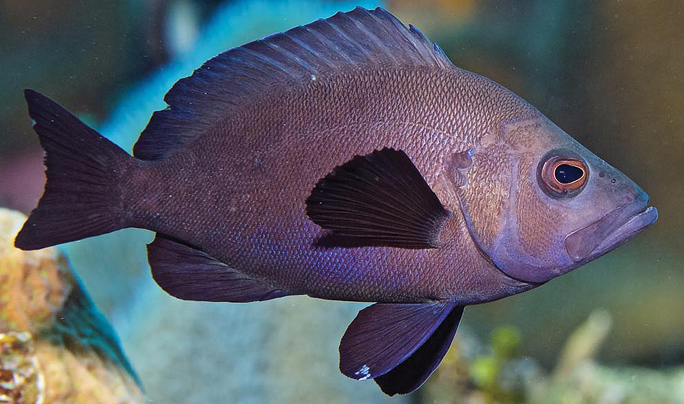
In Roatán

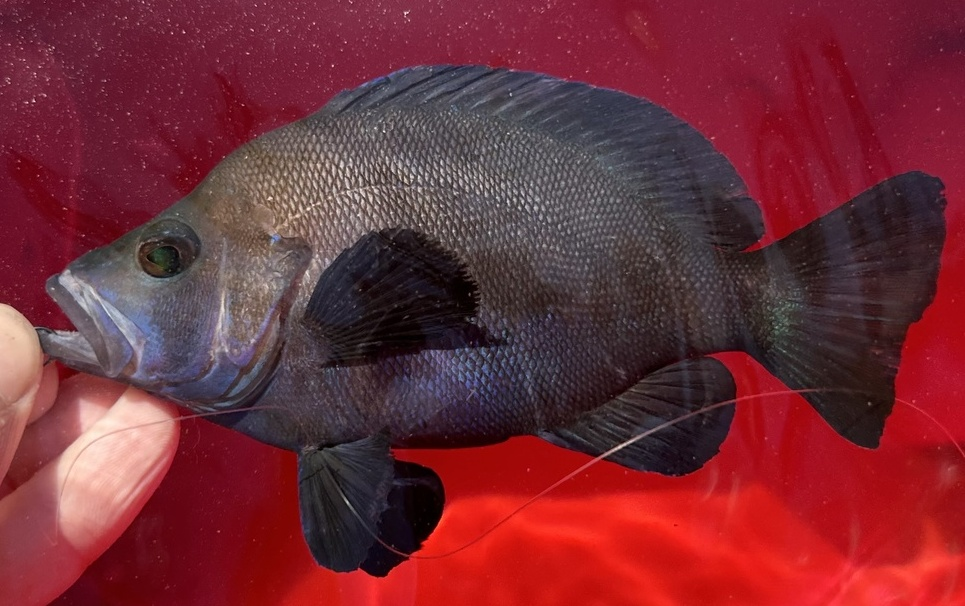
In Florida

== Distribution and habitat ==
The species is native to the central West Atlantic Ocean. Its range extends from southeastern Florida and the Bahamas, through the Caribbean Sea and the Gulf of Mexico to Santa Marta in Colombia and to the islands off the coast of Venezuela. It is a reef fish, inhabiting reefs with both stony corals and soft corals.

== Ecology ==
As a simultaneous hermaphrodite, H. nigricans has an unusual reproductive strategy known as egg trading. The fish is usually solitary, but at breeding time two fish come together at night. Courtship is initiated by one fish which temporarily takes a female role. The other fish acts as the male and fertilises a batch of eggs produced by the first fish. The following night their roles are reversed, and the second fish lays eggs and the first fish fertilises them. The two fish continue alternating roles in this way over the course of several nights. The pair usually stay together for the series of transfers, but sometimes each finds a different partner.

== Status ==
H. nigricans has a wide range and is a common fish. No particular threats have been identified and its population seems to be steady, so the International Union for Conservation of Nature has assessed its conservation status as being of "least concern".
