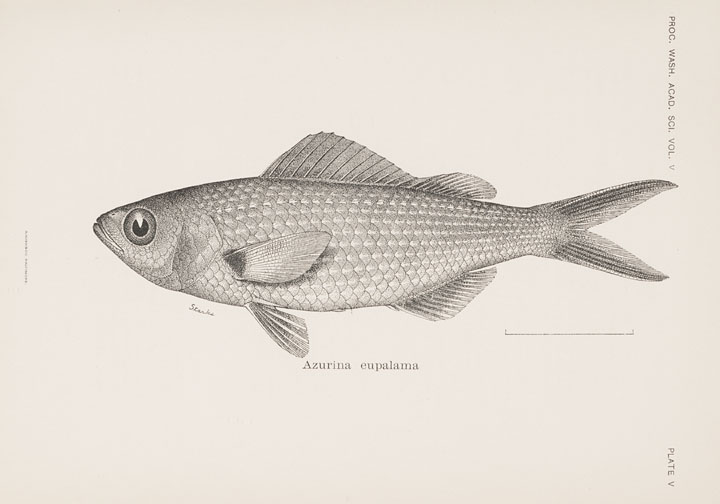

Conservation status
- Critically endangered, possibly extinct (IUCN 3.1)

Scientific classification
- Kingdom: Animalia
- Phylum: Chordata
- Class: Actinopterygii
- Division: Teleostei
- Order: Blenniiformes
- Family: Pomacentridae
- Genus: Azurina
- Species: A. eupalama

Binomial name
- Azurina eupalama Heller and Snodgrass, 1903

= Galapagos damsel =

Species of fish

The Galápagos damsel (Azurina eupalama), also known as the blackspot chromis, is a possibly extinct fish species from the family Pomacentridae. It is endemic to the waters near the Galápagos Islands and Cocos Island.

== Description ==
The Galápagos damsel reaches a length of 15 centimeters. It is olive-gray with a blue tinge, and silvery along the sides. There is a black spot at the base of each pectoral fin. It has a prominent lateral line.

== Biology and occurrence ==
The Galápagos damsel has been recorded from following regions in Galápagos: Floreana, Gardiner Bay, Española, Tagus Cove, Isabela, Marchena, James Bay and Sullivan Bay, Santiago, Wreck Bay, San Cristóbal, Academy Bay, Santa Cruz and Santa Fe. One specimen, found many years ago, which is in the fish collection at the American Museum of Natural History, was collected near Cocos Island. The Galápagos damsel is a plankton feeder. It has been suggested that global climate change may be influencing the rate of extreme El Niño–Southern Oscillation events, such as the one that severely impacted this damselfish.

== Possible extinction ==
The El Niño–Southern Oscillation of 1982 and 1983 led to an increase in the water temperature near the Galápagos Islands. Plankton production was reduced for at least one year, leading to drops in the populations of many planktivorous fish, such as the Galápagos damsel. Despite intensive searches during the next decade, it was not seen again. The International Union for Conservation of Nature lists the fish as a critically endangered species, and one which is possibly extinct. It cites speculation that A. eupalama may still exist on "islands off Peru that have warm temperate conditions, such as the Lobos Islands", but no evidence of this has been found in untargeted survey data to date.
