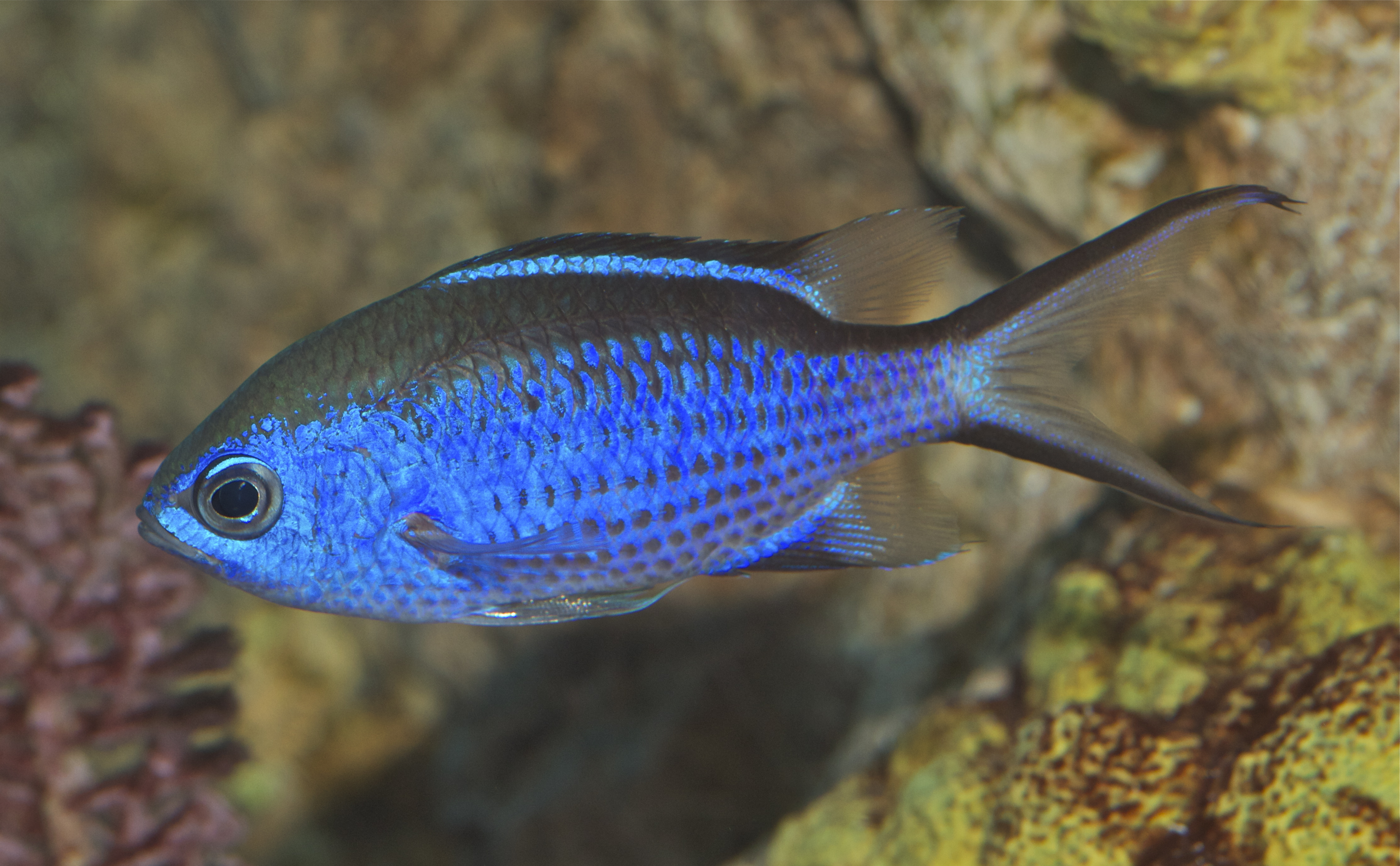
- Azurina cyanea

Scientific classification
- Kingdom: Animalia
- Phylum: Chordata
- Class: Actinopterygii
- Order: Blenniiformes
- Family: Pomacentridae
- Subfamily: Chrominae
- Genus: Azurina; D.S. Jordan and McGregor in Jordan and Evermann, 1898

Type species
- Azurina hirundo D.S. Jordan & McGregor, 1898

Species
- See text.

= Azurina =

Genus of fishes

Azurina is a genus of fish in the family Pomacentridae.

== Species ==
The following species are classified within the genus Azurina:

- Azurina atrilobata (Gill, 1862)
- Azurina brevirostris (Pyle, Earle & Greene, 2008)
- Azurina cyanea (Poey, 1860)
- Azurina elerae (Fowler & Bean 1928)
- Azurina eupalama Heller and Snodgrass, 1903
- Azurina hirundo Jordan & McGregor, 1898
- Azurina intercrusma (Evermann & Radcliffe, 1917)
- Azurina lepidolepis (Bleeker, 1876)
- Azurina meridiana D. W. Greenfield & L. P. Woods, 1980
- Azurina multilineata (Guichenot 1853)
