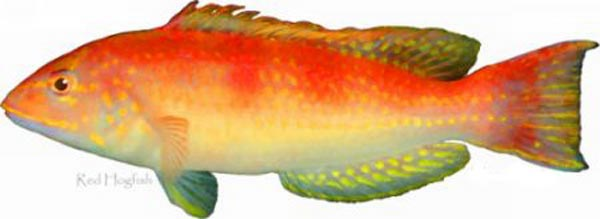
- Decodon puellaris

Scientific classification
- Kingdom: Animalia
- Phylum: Chordata
- Class: Actinopterygii
- Order: Labriformes
- Family: Labridae
- Subfamily: Hypsigenyinae
- Genus: Decodon; Günther, 1861

Type species
- Cossyphus puellaris Poey, 1860

Synonyms
- Pariolanthus J. L. B. Smith, 1968

= Decodon (fish) =

Genus of fishes

Decodon is a genus of wrasses found in the western Atlantic Ocean, the western Indian Ocean and the Pacific Ocean.

== Species ==
The currently recognized species in this genus are:

- Decodon grandisquamis (J. L. B. Smith, 1968) (largescale wrasse)
- Decodon melasma M. F. Gomon, 1974 (blackspot wrasse)
- Decodon pacificus (Kamohara, 1952) (ten-tooth wrasse)
- Decodon puellaris (Poey, 1860) (red hogfish)
