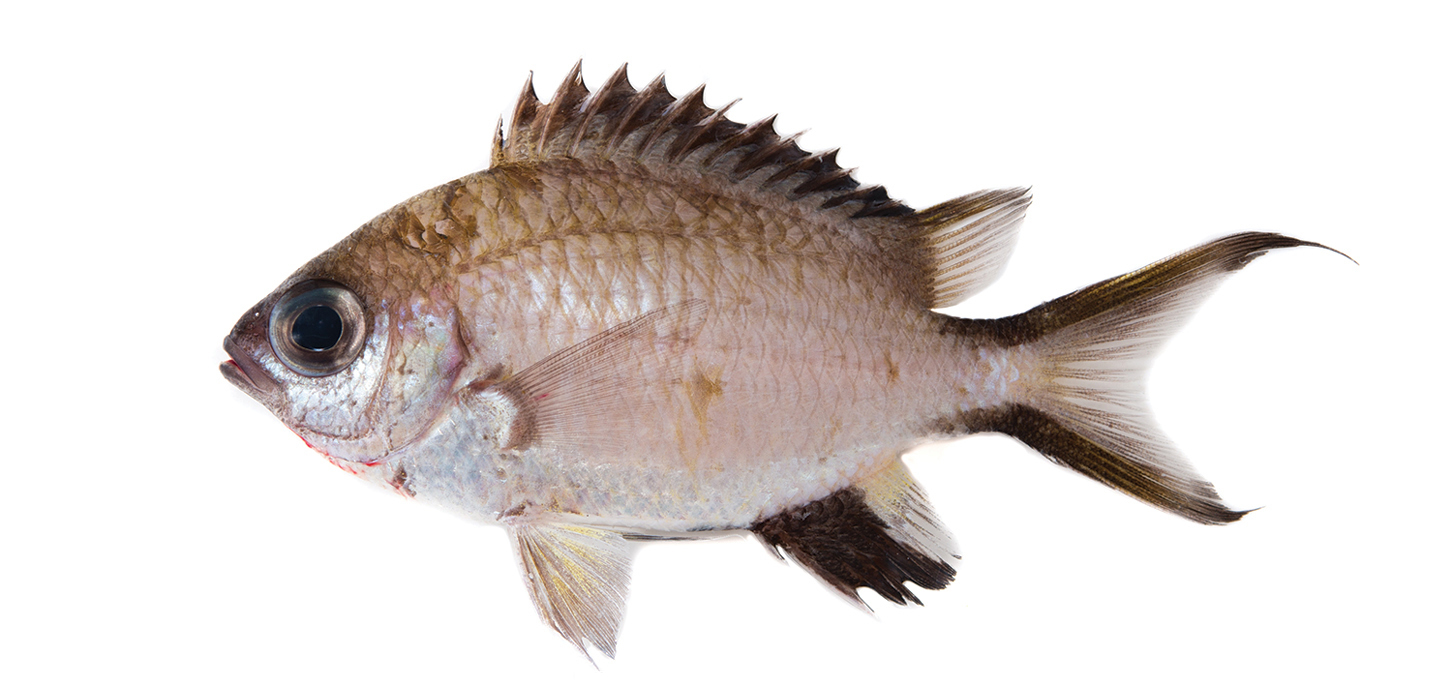

Conservation status
- Least Concern (IUCN 3.1)

Scientific classification
- Kingdom: Animalia
- Phylum: Chordata
- Class: Actinopterygii
- Order: Blenniiformes
- Family: Pomacentridae
- Genus: Chromis
- Species: C. gunting

Binomial name
- Chromis gunting (Arango, Pinheiro, Rocha, Greene, Pyle, Copus, Shepherd & C. R. Rocha, 2019)

= Chromis gunting =

Species of fish

Chromis gunting is a species of marine fish of the damselfishes in the family Pomacentridae. This species was first described in 2019, along with Chromis bowesi and Chromis hangganan, discovered and known only from Verde Island Passage, in Puerto Galera and Batangas, in the Philippines. It is characterized by 11 dorsal fin rays, 11-12 anal fin rays, 16-17 pectoral fin ray, 3 procurrent caudal fin rays, 14-16 tubed lateral-line scales, 19-20 gill rakers. The species body length is 2.1-2.2 standard length, with a light brown colored body when fresh that has a silver area on the anterior end and a bilateral black margin on the exterior side of the tail.

== Distribution and habitat ==
Chromis gunting has a range of distribution in the Philippines, but was particularly found at Batangas and Oriental Mindoro. All three species, C. bowesi, C. gunting and C. hangganan comes from Philippines, and collected at a depth of about 75 – 150 m., with C. gunting at 90 – 130 m.

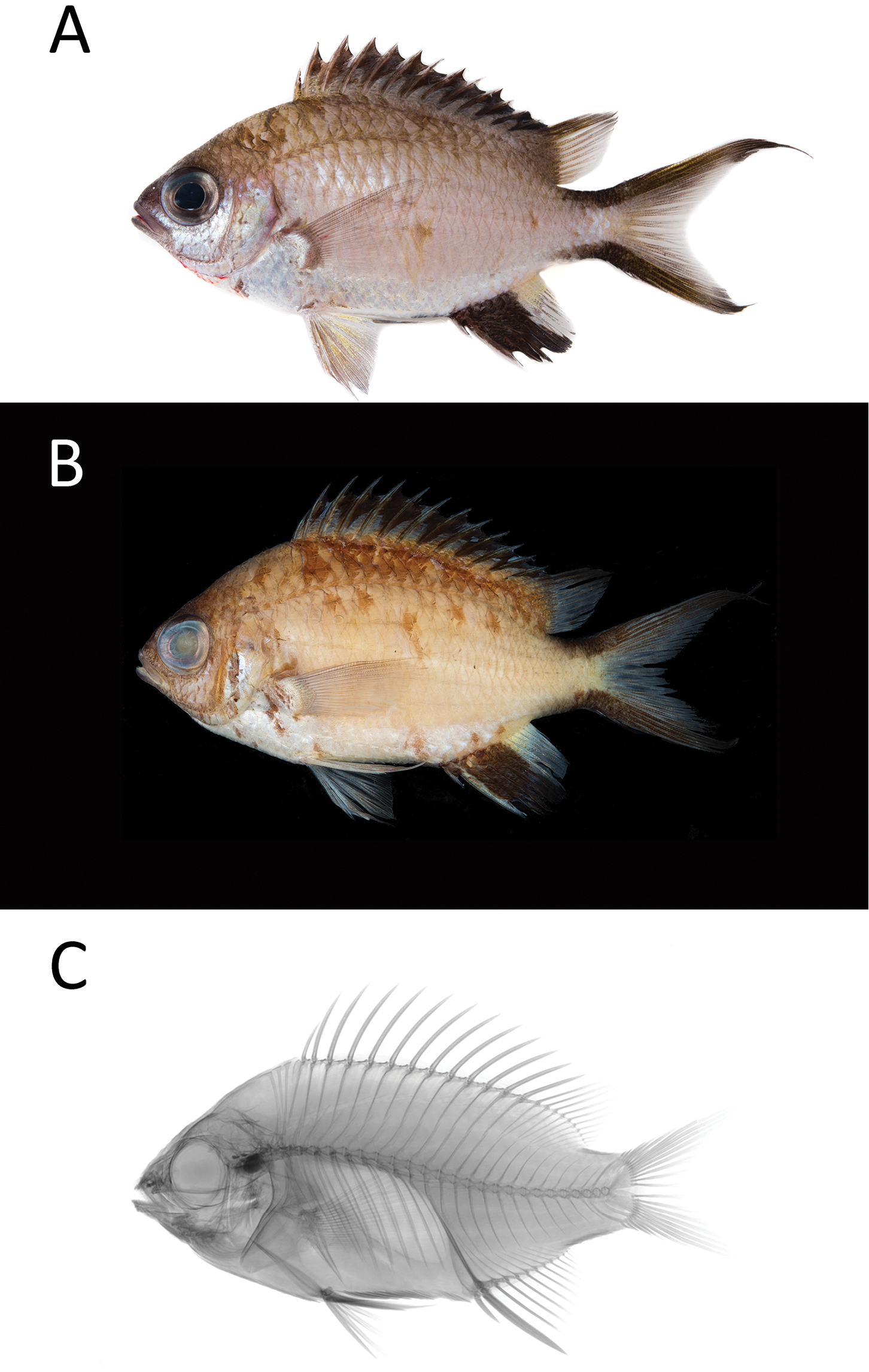
C. gunting

== Description ==
The largest specimen used to describe C. gunting is about 7.7 cm. The mature individual specimen is brown in the upper body, gradually turning pink in the middle body and silvery gray in the lower body. Black fringe along the dorsal-fin spine, and both on the caudal fin (in two lobes) and its caudal peduncle. Soft dorsal fin with black rays. 2/3 in front of anal fin is black, transparent behind with yellow. Transparent pectoral with a gray base. Pelvic fins are light brown, almost transparent, with yellowish fins and gray rays.

== Etymology ==
Gunting means scissors in Tagalog, where the specific epithet was based due to the species scissorlike appearance of its bilateral outermost black margins in the fish's caudal fin, or i.e the scissorlike appearance of the fish's tail.
