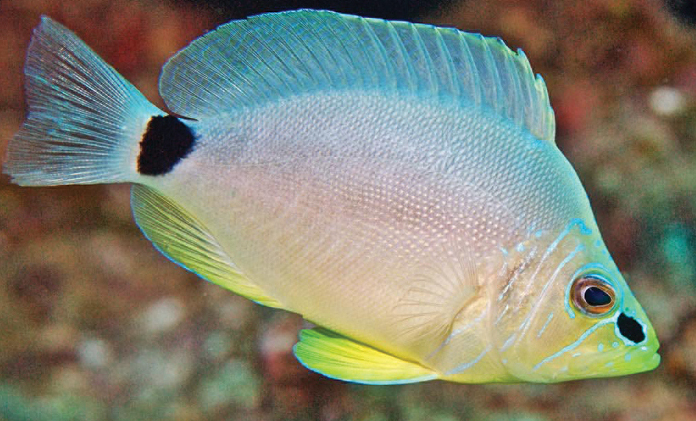

Conservation status
- Least Concern (IUCN 3.1)

Scientific classification
- Kingdom: Animalia
- Phylum: Chordata
- Class: Actinopterygii
- Order: Perciformes
- Family: Serranidae
- Genus: Hypoplectrus
- Species: H. unicolor

Binomial name
- Hypoplectrus unicolor (Walbaum, 1792)

Synonyms
- Perca unicolor Walbaum, 1792

= Hypoplectrus unicolor =

Species of fish

Hypoplectrus unicolor, the butter hamlet or yellowtail hamlet, is a species of marine ray-finned fish, a sea bass from the subfamily Serraninae which is part of the family Serranidae, which also includes the groupers and anthias. It occurs in the western central Atlantic Ocean and occasionally makes its way into the aquarium trade.

== Taxonomy ==
Hypoplectrus unicolor was first formally described in 1792 as Perca unicolor by the German physician, naturalist and taxonomist Johann Julius Walbaum (1724–1799) with no type locality given.

== Description ==
Hypplectrus unicolor has a deep body and head which is highly laterally compressed with a straight forehead and a rather short snout and a protrusible upper jaw. It has an angular preoperculum which has serrations on its edge and a number of small forward pointing spines on its lower margin close to the angle. The continuous dorsal fin has ten spines and 14-17 soft rays. It has long pelvic fins which extend as far as or beyond the anus. The caudal fin is slightly forked. The body is greyish white to yellow in colour with the back being darker, with a sizeable black saddle-like marking on the base of the caudal fin, this extends over the lateral line on each side. Horizontal, iridescent blue lines run along the head, occasionally these extend as far as front edge of the pelvic fins. There is an obvious blue line around the eye. Some individuals may show two black spots on the snout. The pelvic fins are yellowish in colour while the pectoral fins are transparent. This species attains a maximum total length of 12.7 centimetres (5.0 in).

== Distribution ==
Hypoplectrus unicolor is found in the western Atlantic. It extends from Cape Canaveral in Florida south to the Bahamas and into the Gulf of Mexico as far west as Cedar Key and along the mainland coast of Mexico from Tuxpan to the northern Yucatan Peninsula and from northwestern Cuba south through the Caribbean Sea.

== Habitat and biology ==
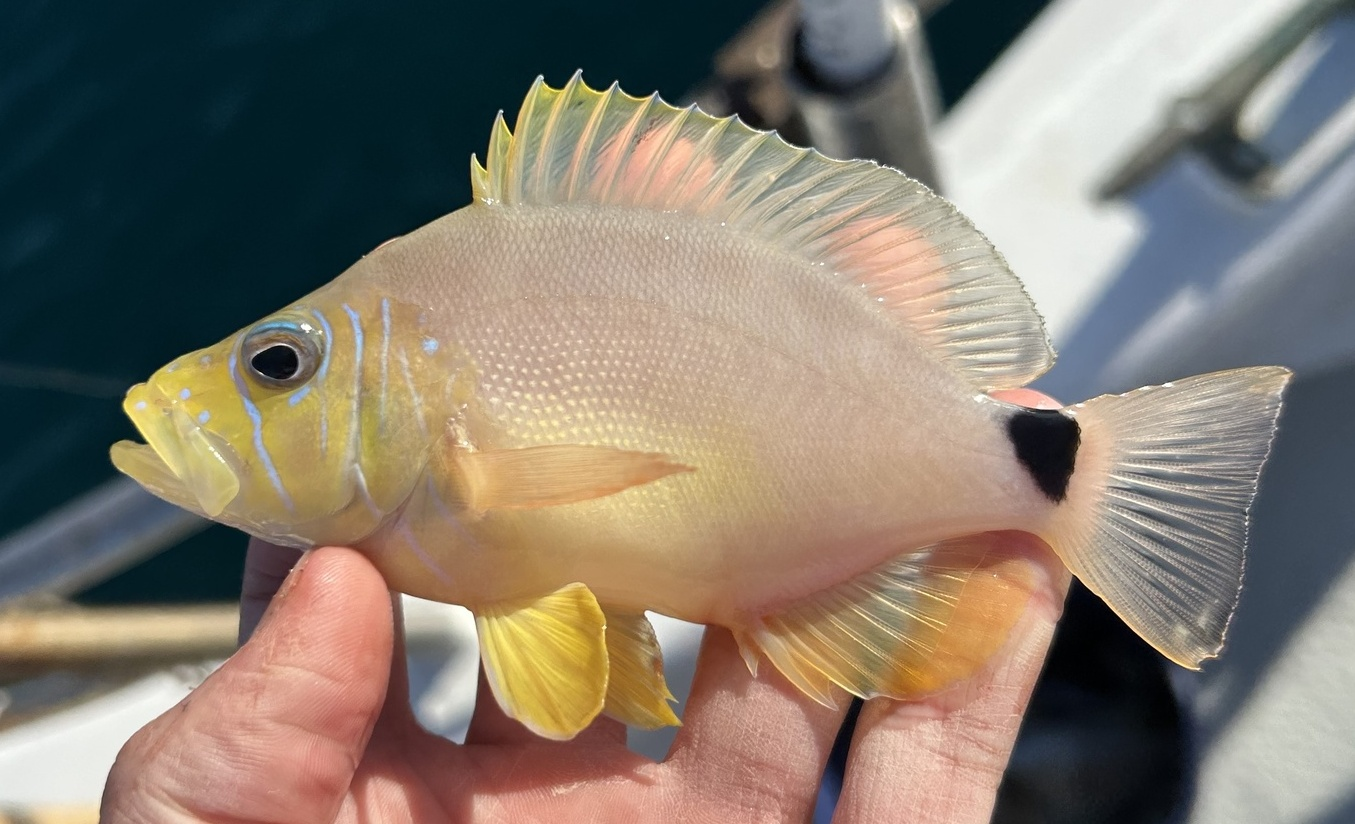
In Florida

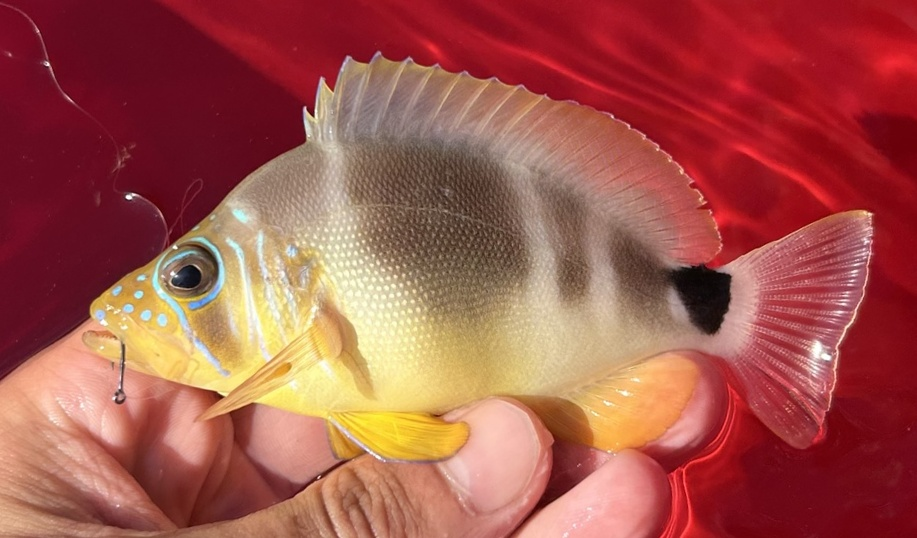
In Florida, showing dark patterning

Hypoplectrus unicolor is found on shallow fringing reef faces, the front slopes of reefs, and under piers. It is normally found at depths between 3 and 25 metres (9.8 and 82.0 ft)>It is a carnivorous species which has a diet largely consisting of crustaceans and smaller fishes. The juveniles are frequently observed in mangroves. The species in the genus Hypoplectrus are synchronous hermaphrodites and they have the ability to move between "male" and "female" roles when spawning.

It has been suggested that H. unicolor is a mimic of the foureye butterflyfish (Chaetodon capistratus) and this proposition was based on resemblances in their colour patterns and general shape, their shared use of similar habitats in shallow waters and the comparative scarcity of H. unicolor and their prey preferences, H. unicolor feeds on mobile benthic animals while C. capistratus preys on sessile benthic invertebrates. However, H. unicolor varies in colour and pattern geographically whereas C. capistratus does not and their juveniles do not resemble each other either. There is a relationship between the two however, as individuals which follow feeding pairs of the butterflyfish have a higher success rate in capturing prey than hamlets that do not associate with butterflyfish.

== Utilisation ==
Hypoplectrus unicolor is occasionally found in the aquarium trade, although it is one of the most highly desired species of hamlet in that trade. It has been reared in captivity.
