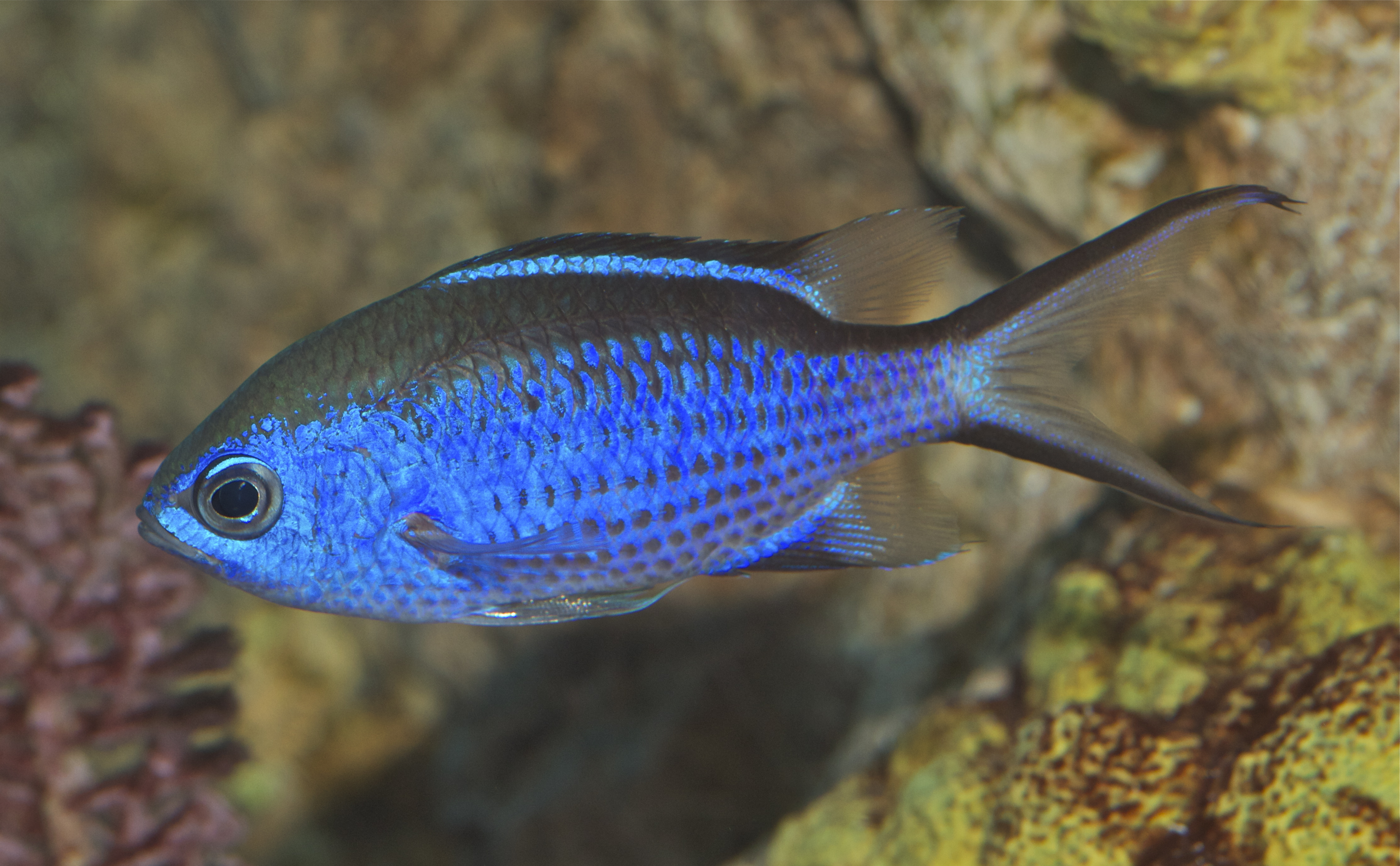

Conservation status
- Least Concern (IUCN 3.1)

Scientific classification
- Kingdom: Animalia
- Phylum: Chordata
- Class: Actinopterygii
- Division: Teleostei
- Order: Blenniiformes
- Family: Pomacentridae
- Genus: Azurina
- Species: A. cyanea

Binomial name
- Azurina cyanea Poey, 1860

= Azurina cyanea =

Species of fish

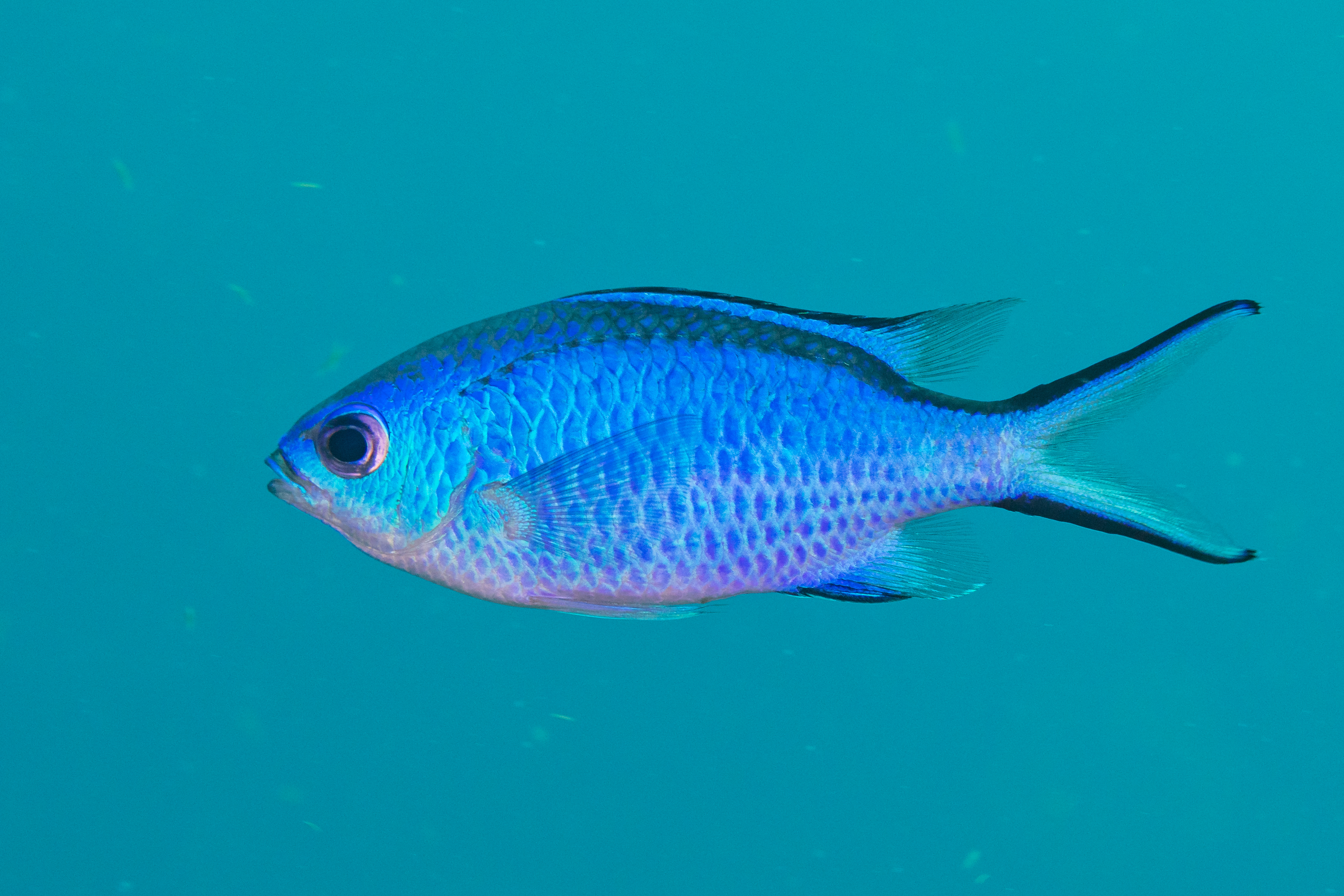
In Belize

Azurina cyanea (blue chromis) is a damselfish in the subfamily Pomacentrinae, found in Bermuda, southern Florida and the Caribbean Sea.

It is collected for the aquarium trade.

== Habitat and ecology ==
Being a shallow water fish, the blue chromis is commonly found at depths of 3 to 5 m, but it can reach depths of 25 m.

It has also been recorded at a depth of 60 m.

It lives on the surface of reefs, but often swims in the water columns above the reefs to feed on plankton.

== Behaviour ==
It's a rather solitary species, seen alone or in small groups, and tends to stay close to the reefs.

The younger fish stay near the bottom in order to avoid predators.

The males maintain a solitary breeding territory. After breeding with multiple females, they guard the eggs until the planktonic larvae hatch.

== Use and trade ==
The blue chromis is largely collected for use in aquariums.

There are no reliable numbers on the extent of this collecting, but damselfish make up the most intensely collected fish group, making up almost half of the aquarium trade.

== Threats ==
Besides the intense aquarium trade, the rapid expansion of lionfish in the Caribbean and the Atlantic coast, is the greatest threat to the blue chromis, as well as several other tropical fish native to the Caribbean.

Furthermore, the loss of live corals could have a definite impact on the species, though this has yet to be investigated more closely.

== Status ==
The blue chromis is assessed as "Least Concern" by the IUCN.

Despite appearing only within an area of 2,500,000 km^{2}, it is considered abundant within that area, without any known continuous decline in range or population numbers.

It's collected for the aquarium trade, but not in great numbers. Despite this, a deeper study is required, to measure the impact of the decline in habitat quality in the Caribbean has on the species.
