= Felipe Poey =

Cuban zoologist (1799-1891)

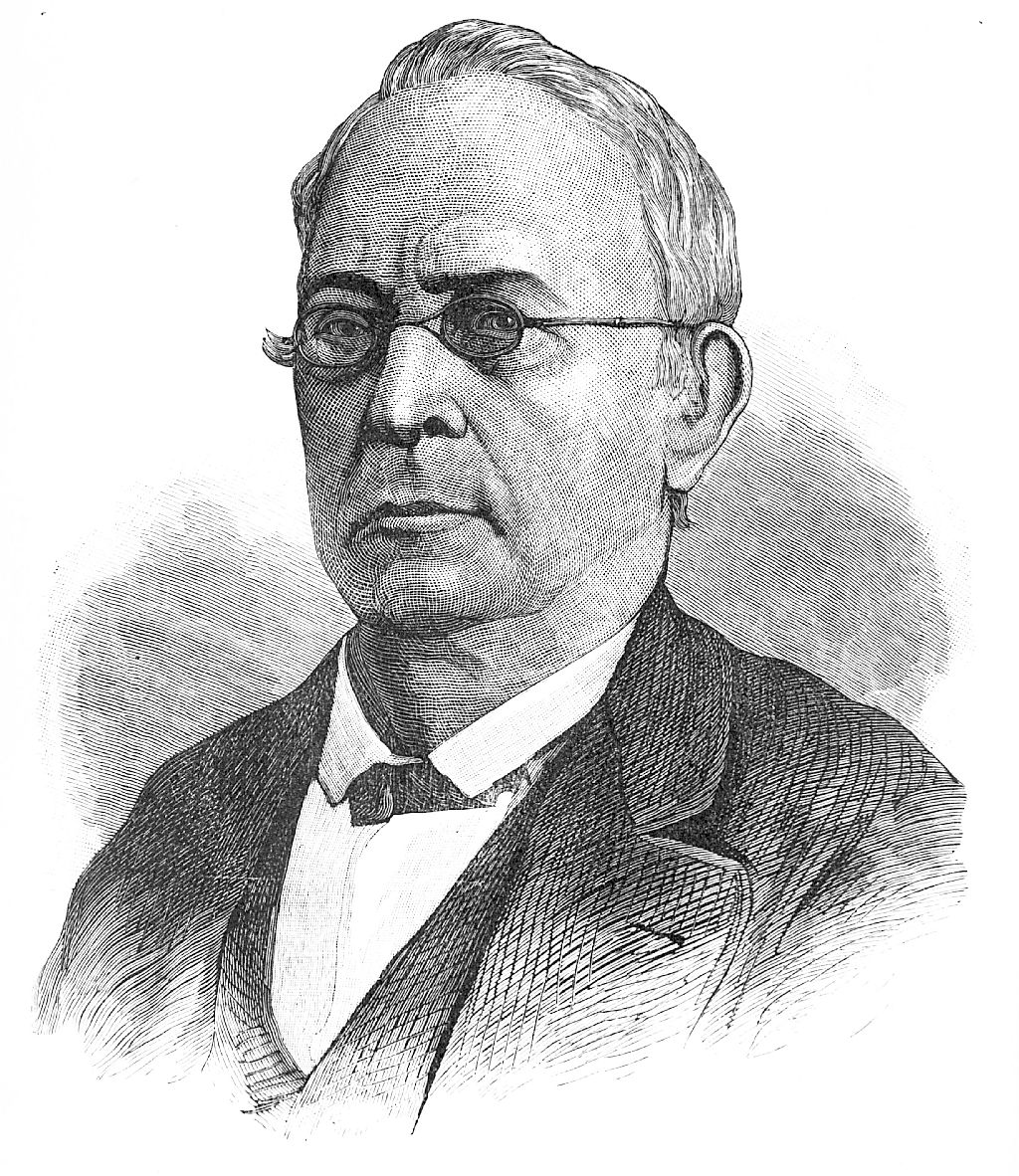
- Born: Felipe Poey; 26 May 1799; Havana, Cuba
- Died: 28 January 1891 (aged 91)
- Scientific career
- Author abbrev. (zoology): Poey

Signature
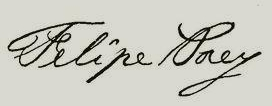

Felipe Poey (May 26, 1799 – January 28, 1891) was a Cuban zoologist.

== Biography ==
Poey was born in Havana, the son of French and Spanish parents. He spent several years (1804 to 1807) of his life in Pau then studied law in Madrid. He became a lawyer in Spain but was forced to leave due to his liberal ideas, returning to Cuba in 1823. He began to concentrate on the study of the natural science and traveled to France in 1825 with his wife. He began writing on the butterflies of Cuba and acquiring knowledge on fish, later supplying Georges Cuvier and Valenciennes with fish specimens from Cuba. He took part in the foundation, in 1832, of the Société Entomologique de France.

Poey returned to Cuba in 1833 where he founded the Museum of Natural History in 1839. In 1842, he became the first professor of zoology and comparative anatomy at the University of Havana. He also took part in the creation of the Academy of Science (natural, physical and medical) of Havana and was a president of the Anthropological Society.

== Works ==
(selected)

- Centurie de Lepidoptere de L'Ile de Cuba (Paris, 1832)
- Compilation of Geography of the Island of Cuba (1836)
- Curso de zoología, profesado en la Real Universidad de la Habana (Havana, 1843)
- Memories on the Natural History of the Island of Cuba (1851 et 1856–1858)
- Historia Natural de la Isla de Cuba (2 vols., 1860)
- Poissons de l'île de Cuba (1874)
- Ictiología Cubana, a 20-volume work on the fishes of Cuba
- Enumeratio piscium Cubensium (1875–1876)

== Philately ==
Cuba commemorated the 175th anniversary of Poey's birth by issuing a series of six stamps and a stamp sheet in 1974. This same country celebrated the 200th anniversary of his birth by the issue of a series of four illustrated fish stamps in 1999.

== See also ==
- Category:Taxa named by Felipe Poey
