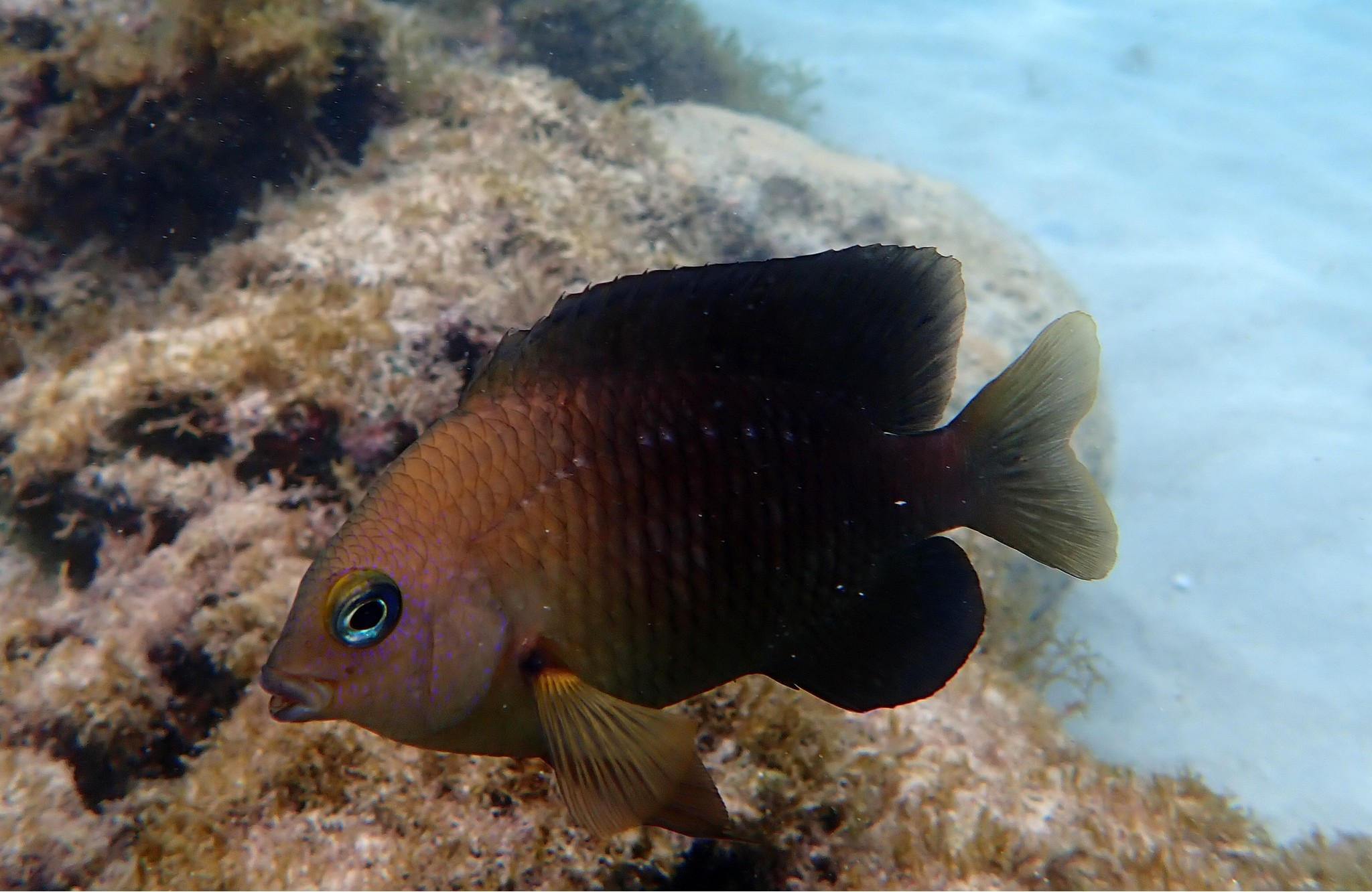
- Stegastes fuscus

Conservation status
- Least Concern (IUCN 3.1)

Scientific classification
- Kingdom: Animalia
- Phylum: Chordata
- Class: Actinopterygii
- Order: Blenniiformes
- Family: Pomacentridae
- Genus: Stegastes
- Species: S. fuscus

Binomial name
- Stegastes fuscus (Cuvier, 1830)

Synonyms
- Eupomacentrus fuscus (Cuvier, 1830); Pomacentrus fuscus Cuvier, 1830; Stegastes trindadensis Gasparini, Moura & Sazima, 1999

= Stegastes fuscus =

Species of fish

Stegastes fuscus, the dusky damselfish, is a species of bony fish in the family Pomacentridae found near the seabed in shallow waters on the western fringes of the Atlantic Ocean.

== Description ==
The colour of an adult dusky damselfish varies from brownish-olive to dark grey, with fine, darker-coloured, vertical stripes on the body. The fins are large with sometimes a blue rim around the edge of the dorsal and anal fins. The dorsal fin has 12 spines and 15-16 soft rays while the anal fin has two spines and 13-14 soft rays. The dusky damselfish can be distinguished from the very similar longfin damselfish (Stegastes diencaeus) by the shorter, less angular dorsal and anal fins. The maximum length is 15 cm (5.9 in), but 10 cm (3.9 in) is a more typical length.

The juvenile dusky damselfish is pearly grey with blue spots on the top of its head. It has a large, blue-rimmed, black eyespot where the dorsal fin spines meet the dorsal fin soft rays, and a smaller, similarly coloured eyespot on the caudal peduncle. Some juveniles off the coast of southeastern Brazil have a vivid yellow and orange band on the back and dorsal fin.

== Distribution ==
Stegastes fuscus occurs in shallow waters off Brazil, where it is common on both rocky and coral reefs at depths down to 40 m (130 ft). It is also reported from the Caribbean Sea, but another species, Pomacentrus dorsopunicans, possibly was misidentified there. Another population is reported from Senegal, but this lacks confirmation.

== Biology ==
About 70% of the food consumed by the dusky damselfish consists of algae, mostly red, filamentous algae, but some calcareous algae are also eaten. The rest of their diet is small invertebrates. The feeding activities of the damselfish prevent coarser seaweeds, such as Jania spp., becoming dominant and greatly influences the structure of the benthic community.

== Behaviour ==
The dusky damselfish is a territorial species. It guards part of the seabed and repels intruders, sometimes chasing away fish several times its own size. The richer the site was in suitable algae for feeding, the more aggressive the fish became. Besides members of its own species, the main species chased away were parrotfish, bluehead wrasse (Thalassoma bifasciatum), bicolour damselfish (Stegastes partitus) and ocean surgeonfish (Acanthurus bahianus). Certain other fish species, such as the smooth trunkfish (Rhinesomus triqueter) and the graysby (Cephalopholis cruentata), were not chased away. The author of the study surmised it was the food source rather than the geographical area being guarded, and these fish were not considered to be threats because they did not graze algae, instead feeding on small invertebrates. An alternative possibility was these fish benefited the dusky damselfish in some other way, such as by providing some protection against predators or by removing invertebrates that feed on algae.
