= Dusky damselfish =

Dusky damselfish is a common name for several fishes and may refer to:

- Stegastes adustus
- Stegastes fuscus
