= Cocoa damselfish =

Cocoa damselfish may refer to two different species of fish, formerly considered as conspecific:

- Brazilian cocoa damselfish (Stegastes variabilis), a species of fish found in the western Atlantic off Brazil
- Caribbean cocoa damselfish (Stegastes xanthurus), a species of fish found in the Caribbean
