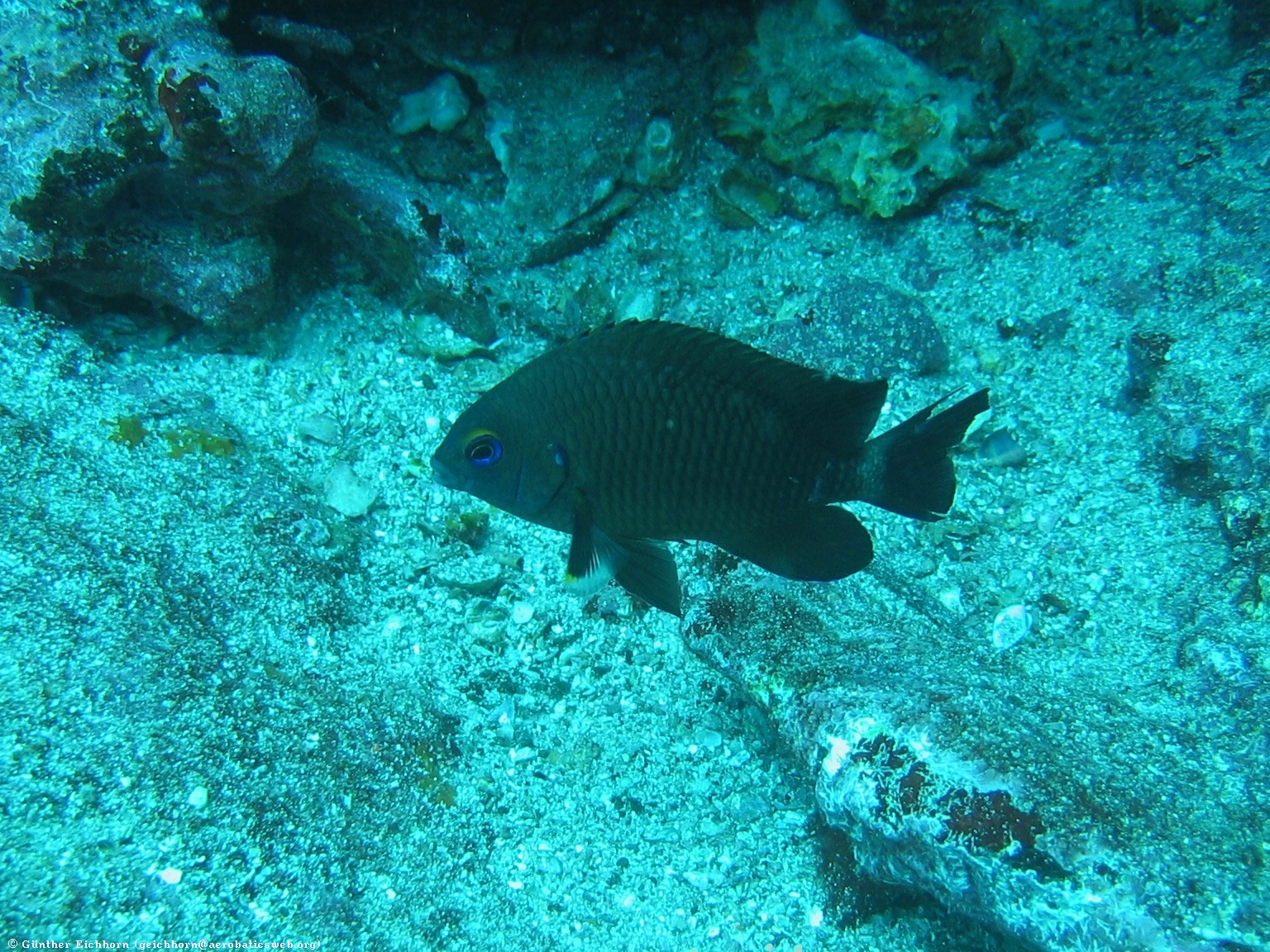

Conservation status
- Least Concern (IUCN 3.1)

Scientific classification
- Kingdom: Animalia
- Phylum: Chordata
- Class: Actinopterygii
- Order: Blenniiformes
- Family: Pomacentridae
- Genus: Stegastes
- Species: S. beebei

Binomial name
- Stegastes beebei (Nichols, 1924)

Synonyms
- Eupomacentrus beebei Nichols, 1924

= Stegastes beebei =

Galapagos ringtail damselfish

Species of fish

Stegastes beebei (Galapagos ringtail damselfish or southern whitetail major), is a species of damselfish found on coral and rocky reefs at depths between 0 and 15 m. They are somewhat territorial, and chase away small intruders. They are omnivorous, grazing on algae and nibbling at small crustaceans and the tentacles of anemones. They are oviparous, with distinct pairing during breeding. The eggs are demersal and adhere to the substrate. Males guard and aerate the eggs.

== Description ==
From: The body is oval and compressed, with one pair of nostrils. The margin of the preopercle is serrated; the margin of bone under the eyes is serrated, without a notch in it and the bone before it. The mouth is small and protrusible with teeth in a single row, long and close-set. About 11 (10–12) lower gill rakers are present. They have a single continuous dorsal fin, and no projecting short spines at upper and lower base of tail fin. The caudal fin is bluntly forked. The scales are moderately large and rough; the body is scaled, and the head is largely scaled (the snout is scaled to the nostrils), as are the basal parts of the median fins. The lateral line has 20 scales (rarely 19). It is incomplete and ends under the end of the dorsal fin base. They grow up to 17 cm in length.

Galapagos ringtail damselfish are dark brown with darker scale outlines, often with a white band on the caudal peduncle. They have blue irises and white or yellow outer edges of the pectoral fin. Juveniles are dark with a red nape, upper back and spiny dorsal fin, and a dark ocellus at the rear base of the dorsal fin.

== Distribution ==
They are found in the eastern Pacific off Panama, Malpelo Island (Colombia), Cocos Island (Panama), and the Galápagos Islands.

== Etymology ==
The specific name honours the American naturalist and explorer William Beebe (1877–1962) of the New York Zoological Society.
