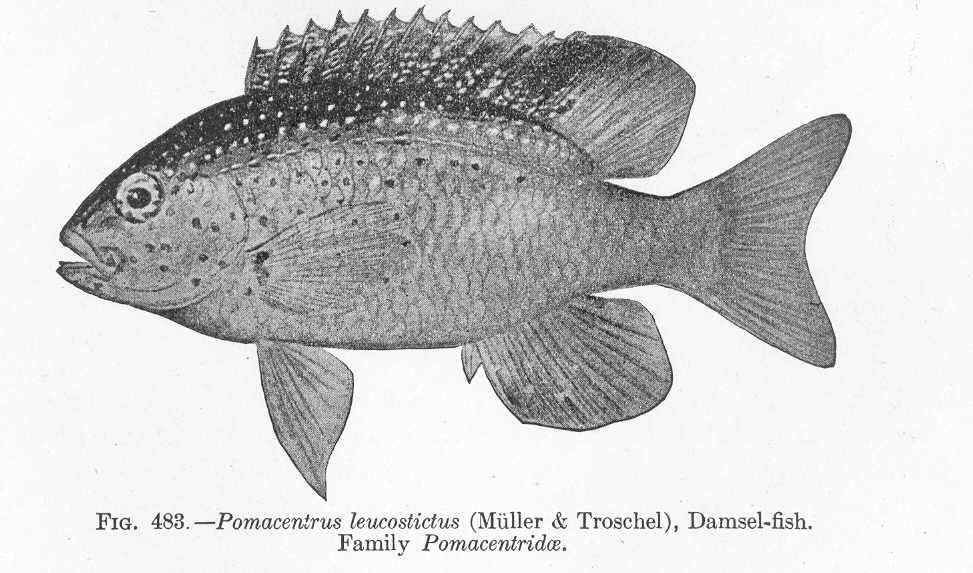

Conservation status
- Least Concern (IUCN 3.1)

Scientific classification
- Kingdom: Animalia
- Phylum: Chordata
- Class: Actinopterygii
- Division: Teleostei
- Order: Blenniiformes
- Family: Pomacentridae
- Genus: Stegastes
- Species: S. imbricatus

Binomial name
- Stegastes imbricatus Jenyns, 1840

Synonyms
- Pomacentrus hamyi Rochebrune, 1880

= Stegastes imbricatus =

Species of fish

Stegastes imbricatus, commonly called the Cape Verde gregory, is a damselfish of the family Pomacentridae. It is native to the tropical eastern Atlantic Ocean.

== Distribution and habitat ==
Stegastes imbricatus is native to the tropical eastern Atlantic Ocean. Its range extends from Senegal to Angola, and it also occurs around the Canary Islands, Cape Verde and several islands in the Gulf of Guinea. It inhabits rocky areas where it is found at depths down to about 25 m (82 ft). Its maximum length is 10 cm.

== History ==
It was first described in 1840 by the English naturalist Leonard Jenyns after a specimen collected in Praia Harbor, Cape Verde, by Charles Darwin on his journey with HMS Beagle.
