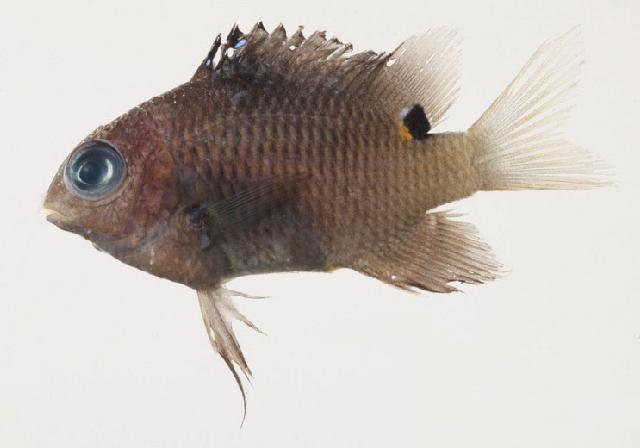

Conservation status
- Least Concern (IUCN 3.1)

Scientific classification
- Kingdom: Animalia
- Phylum: Chordata
- Class: Actinopterygii
- Order: Blenniiformes
- Family: Pomacentridae
- Genus: Stegastes
- Species: S. albifasciatus

Binomial name
- Stegastes albifasciatus (Schlegel & Müller, 1839)

Synonyms
- Pomacentrus albifasciatus Schlegel & Müller, 1839; Eupomacentrus albifasciatus (Schlegel & Müller, 1839); Eupomacentrus albofasciatus (Schlegel & Müller, 1839); Parapomacentrus albifasciatus (Schlegel & Müller, 1839); Pomacentrus leucopleura Bleeker, 1854; Pomacentrus eclipticus D.S. Jordan & Seale, 1906

= Stegastes albifasciatus =

Species of fish

Stegastes albifasciatus, known commonly as the whitebar gregory or white-banded gregory, is a damselfish of the family Pomacentridae native to the western Indo-Pacific. Its range extends from the Seychelles and Réunion to the Ryukyu Islands, the Tuamoto Islands, and New Caledonia, where it is found on reef flats, reef margins and lagoons on patches of rubble or reef rock with live corals, particularly in areas of moderate water movement.
