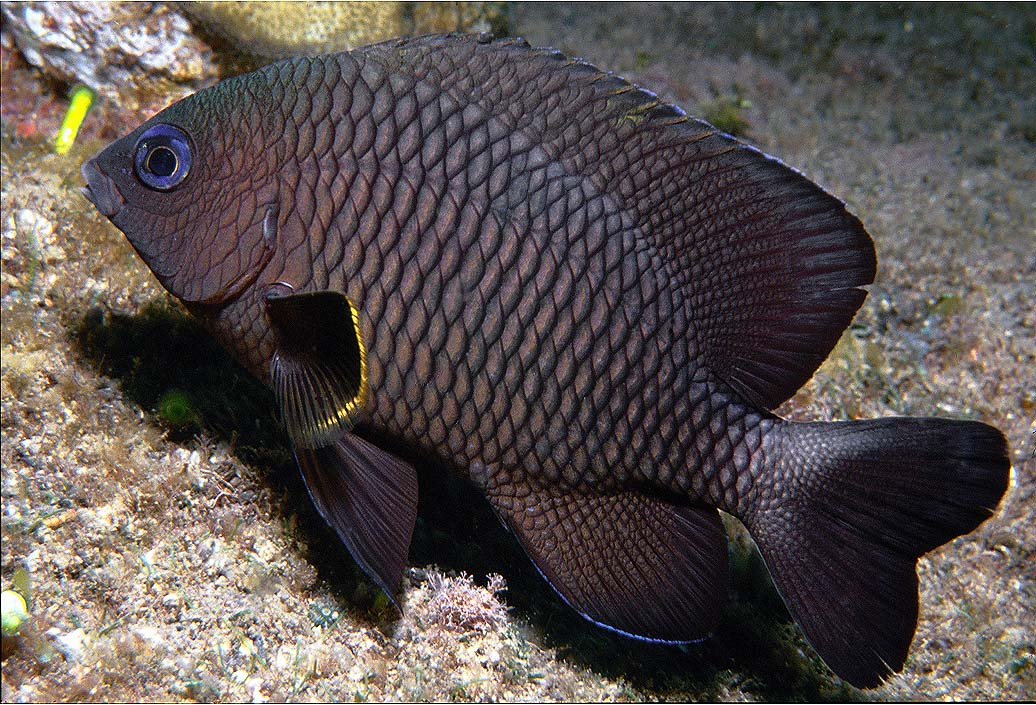
- Revillagigedo Islands

Conservation status
- Vulnerable (IUCN 3.1)

Scientific classification
- Kingdom: Animalia
- Phylum: Chordata
- Class: Actinopterygii
- Order: Blenniiformes
- Family: Pomacentridae
- Genus: Stegastes
- Species: S. leucorus

Binomial name
- Stegastes leucorus (Gilbert, 1892)
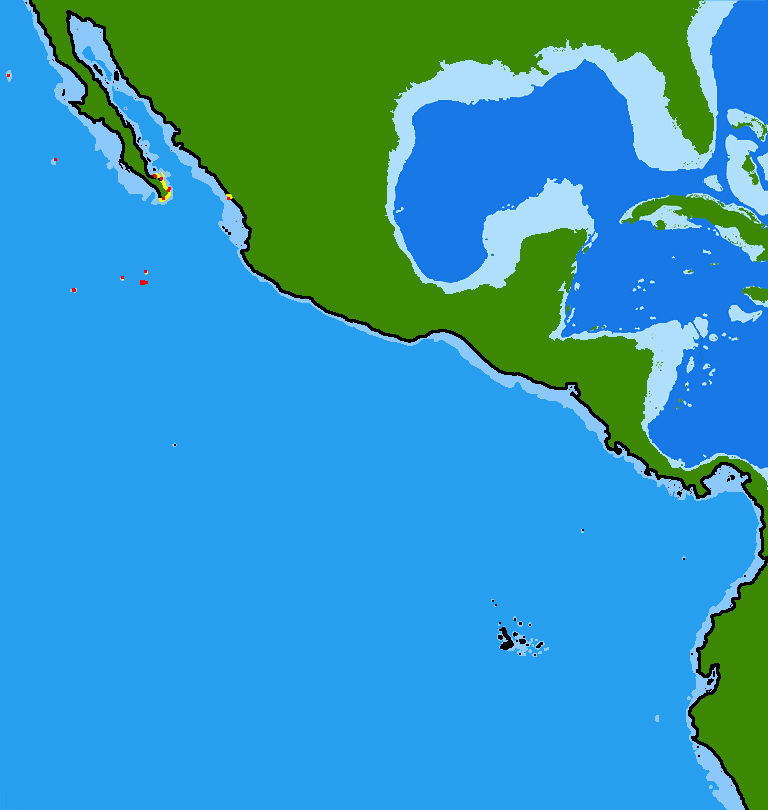

Synonyms
- List: Eupomacentrus leucorus (Gilbert, 1892); Pomacentrus elaimelas Fowler, 1944; Pomacentrus leucorus Gilbert, 1892; Stegastes leucorus leucorus (Gilbert, 1892)

= Stegastes leucorus =

Species of fish

Stegastes leucorus, commonly known as the whitetail damselfish, the whitetail gregory or the whitetail major, is a damselfish of the family Pomacentridae. It is native to the tropical eastern Pacific Ocean.

== Distribution and habitat ==
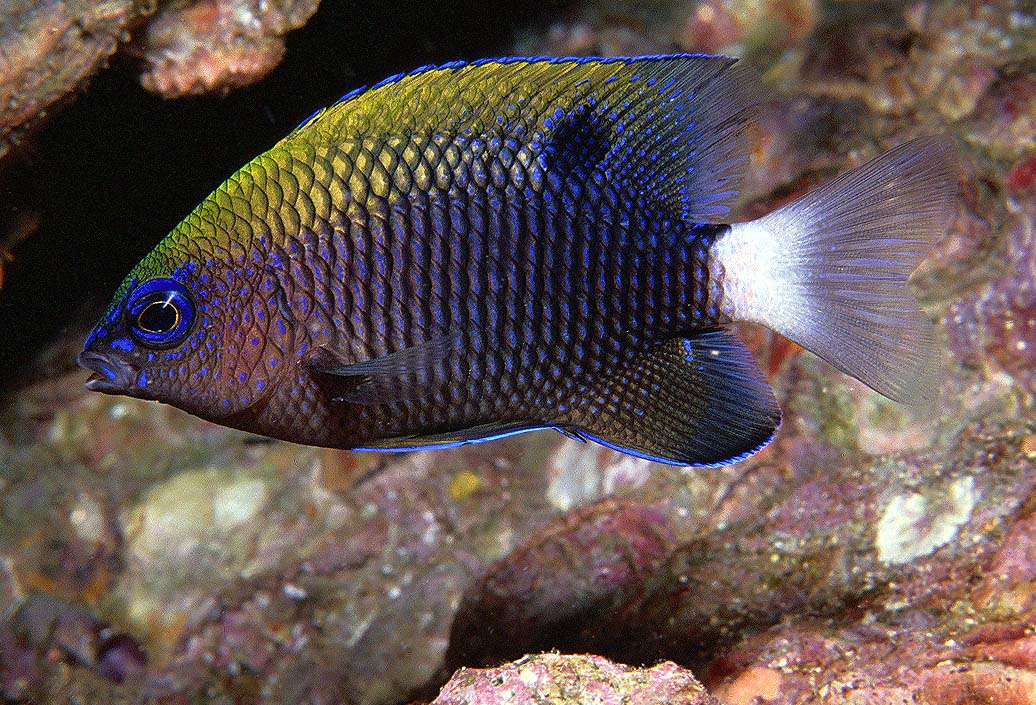
Juvenile, in the Revillagigedo Islands

Stegastes leucorus is native to the tropical eastern central Pacific Ocean. Its range extends from Mexico and Baja California to the Revillagigedo Islands and Guadalupe Island. It inhabits rocky and coral inshore reefs where it is found at depths down to about 15 m (49 ft).

== Behaviour ==
They are known to clean a rock face where they intend to lay eggs by sucking up and blowing sand grains onto the surface.

== Status ==
This fish is common in parts of the Revillagigedo Islands but uncommon on the mainland coast. It is estimated that 90% of its total population is confined to a single area of the Revillagigedo Islands, a total occupancy of less than 2,000 km^{2} (772 sq mi). Because of its shallow water habitat and limited range, the IUCN has listed it as "Vulnerable" since El Niño events periodically affect this area.
