= Threespot damselfish =

Threespot damselfish is a common name for several fishes and may refer to:

- Dascyllus trimaculatus
- Stegastes planifrons
