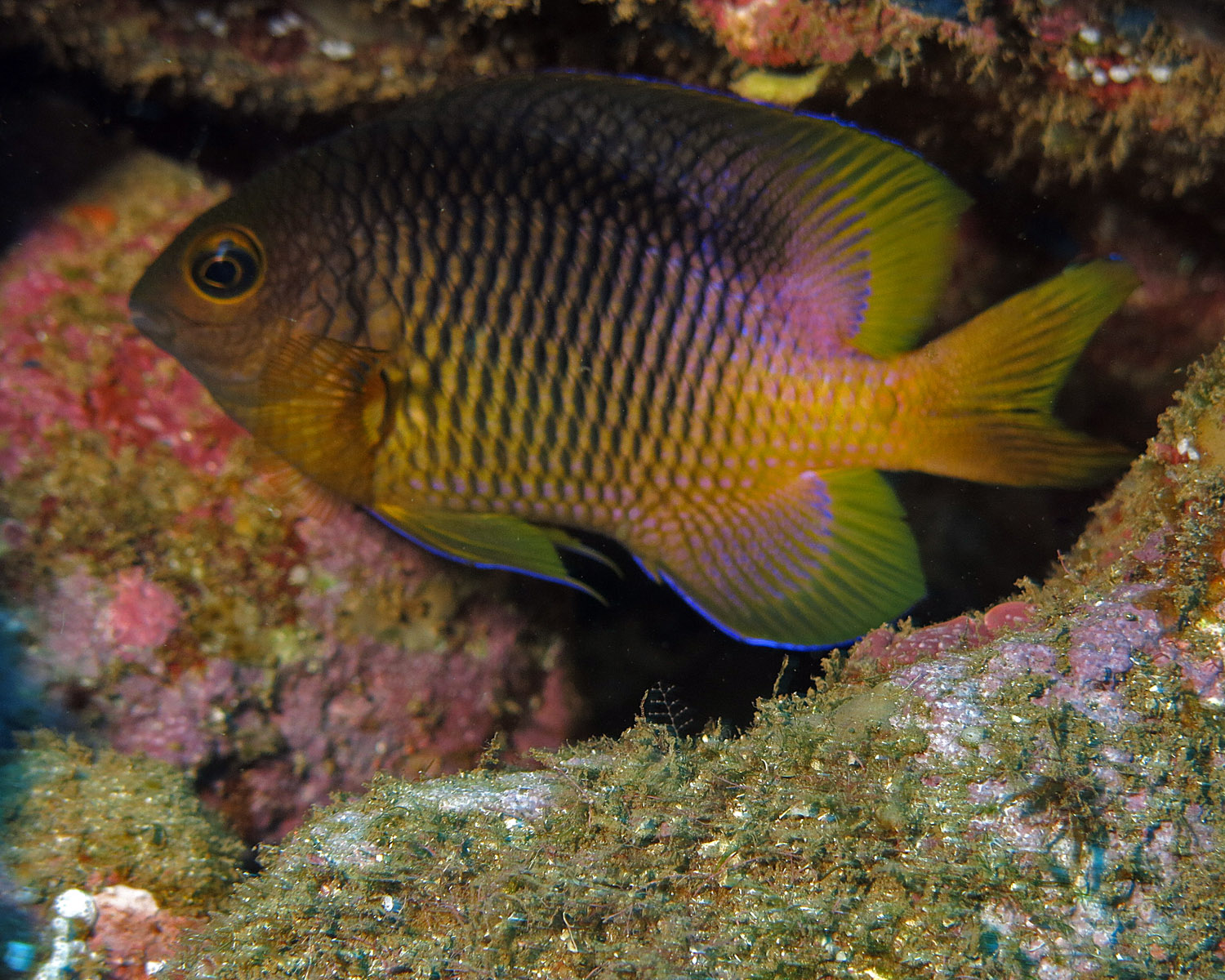

Conservation status
- Vulnerable (IUCN 3.1)

Scientific classification
- Kingdom: Animalia
- Phylum: Chordata
- Class: Actinopterygii
- Order: Blenniiformes
- Family: Pomacentridae
- Genus: Stegastes
- Species: S. redemptus

Binomial name
- Stegastes redemptus (Heller & Snodgrass, 1903)

Synonyms
- Pomacentrus redemptus Heller & Snodgrass, 1903

= Stegastes redemptus =

Species of fish

Stegastes redemptus, commonly known as the clarion major, clarion damselfish or clarion gregory, is a damselfish of the family Pomacentridae. It is native to the tropical eastern Pacific Ocean, its range extending from the Revillagigedo Islands to the coast of Baja California. It is found on rocky reefs at depths ranging from 1 to 15 m (3 ft 3 in to 49 ft 3 in).

== Status ==
Stegastes redemptus has a very small range and 95% of the population is estimated to be found in the waters around the Revillagigedo Islands, an area of less than 2,000 km^{2} (772 sq mi). The trend in population is unknown, but the small area of occupancy makes it vulnerable to external events such as environmental changes. El Niño events may cause the shallow waters in which it lives to become too warm and deficient in nutrients for extended periods which may threaten its survival. For these reasons, the IUCN has rated it as being "Vulnerable". No special conservation measures are in place but part of its range is within the Revillagigedo Islands Marine Protected Area.
