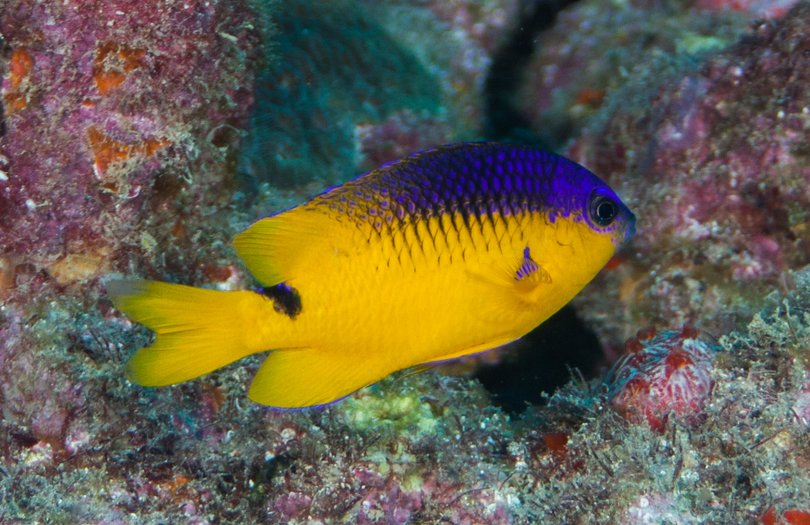

Conservation status
- Least Concern (IUCN 3.1)

Scientific classification
- Kingdom: Animalia
- Phylum: Chordata
- Class: Actinopterygii
- Order: Blenniiformes
- Family: Pomacentridae
- Genus: Stegastes
- Species: S. rocasensis

Binomial name
- Stegastes rocasensis (Emery, 1972)

Synonyms
- Eupomacentrus rocasensis Emery, 1972; Pomacentrus rocasensis (Emery, 1972); Stegastes sanctipauli Lubbock and Edwards, 1981

= Stegastes rocasensis =

Species of fish

Stegastes rocasensis, commonly known as the Rocas gregory, is a damselfish of the family Pomacentridae. It is endemic to the tropical West Atlantic Ocean, where it is found at the surface, or at depths above 60 m (197 ft). It is known only from the Atlantic coast of Brazil including the Saint Peter and Saint Paul Archipelago.
