= Stegastes baldwini =

Conservation status
- Near Threatened (IUCN 3.1)

Scientific classification
- Kingdom: Animalia
- Phylum: Chordata
- Class: Actinopterygii
- Order: Blenniiformes
- Family: Pomacentridae
- Genus: Stegastes
- Species: S. baldwini

Binomial name
- Stegastes baldwini (Allen & Woods, 1980)

Species of fish

Stegastes baldwini, is a damselfish of the family Pomacentridae.

It is endemic to the waters surrounding Clipperton Island in the eastern Pacific Ocean. It is found on rocky reefs at depths ranging from 1 to 5 m (3 ft 3 in to 16 ft 5 in).
