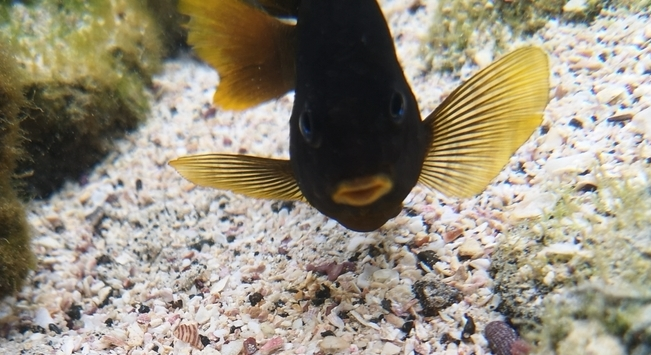

Conservation status
- Least Concern (IUCN 3.1)

Scientific classification
- Kingdom: Animalia
- Phylum: Chordata
- Class: Actinopterygii
- Order: Blenniiformes
- Family: Pomacentridae
- Genus: Stegastes
- Species: S. arcifrons

Binomial name
- Stegastes arcifrons (Heller and Snodgrass, 1903)

= Stegastes arcifrons =

Species of fish

Stegastes arcifrons, the island major or Galapagos gregory, is a damselfish of the family Pomacentridae native to the eastern Pacific Ocean. Its range extending from Costa Rica to the Cocos Islands, Malpelo Island, and the Galapagos Islands. It is found on rocky and coral reefs at depths ranging from 1 to 20 m (3 ft 3 in to 65 ft 7 in). It is common in many parts of its range, and its population appears to be stable. No particular threats have been identified, and the IUCN rates it as being of "Least Concern".

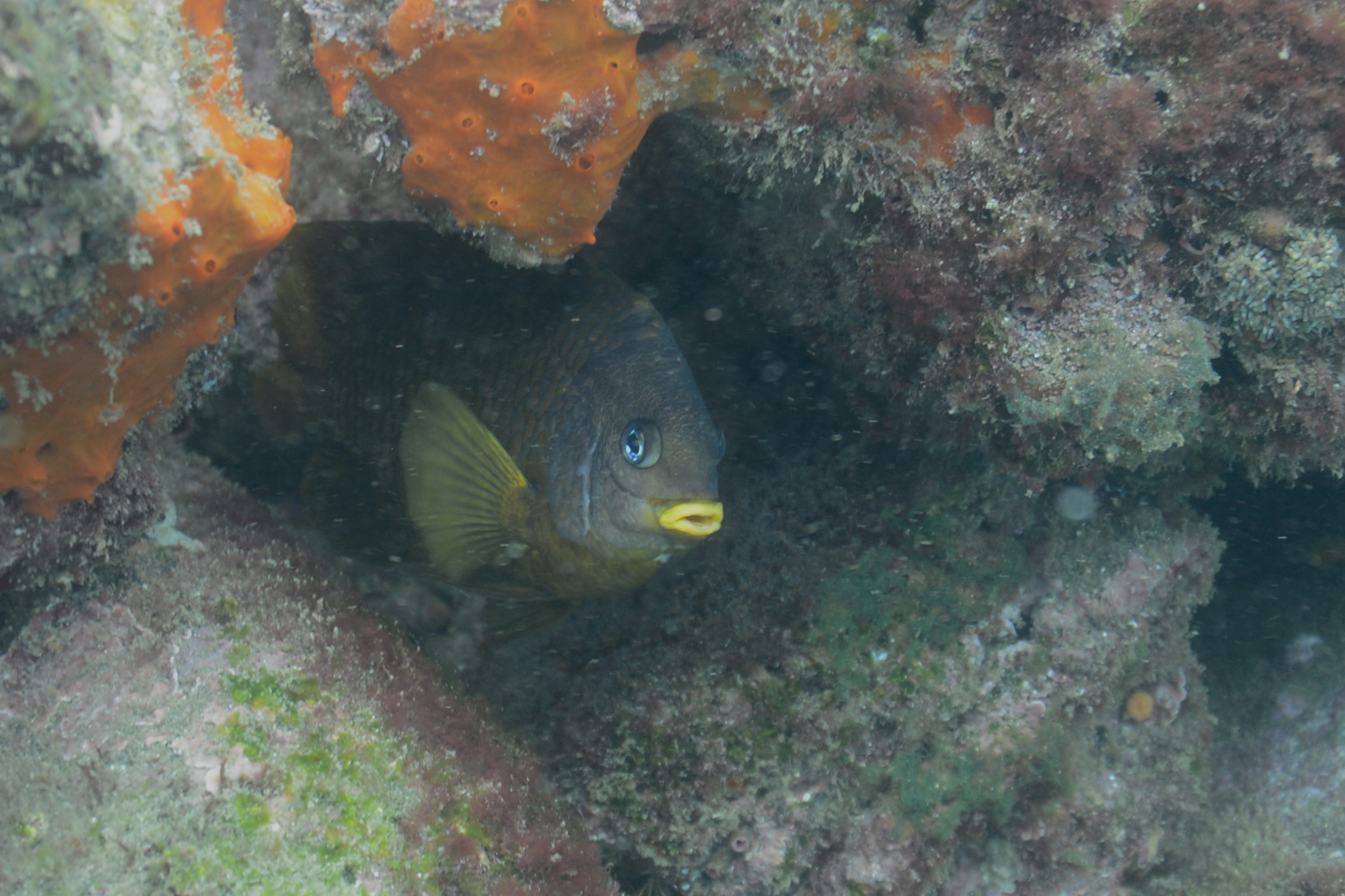
In the Galapagos
