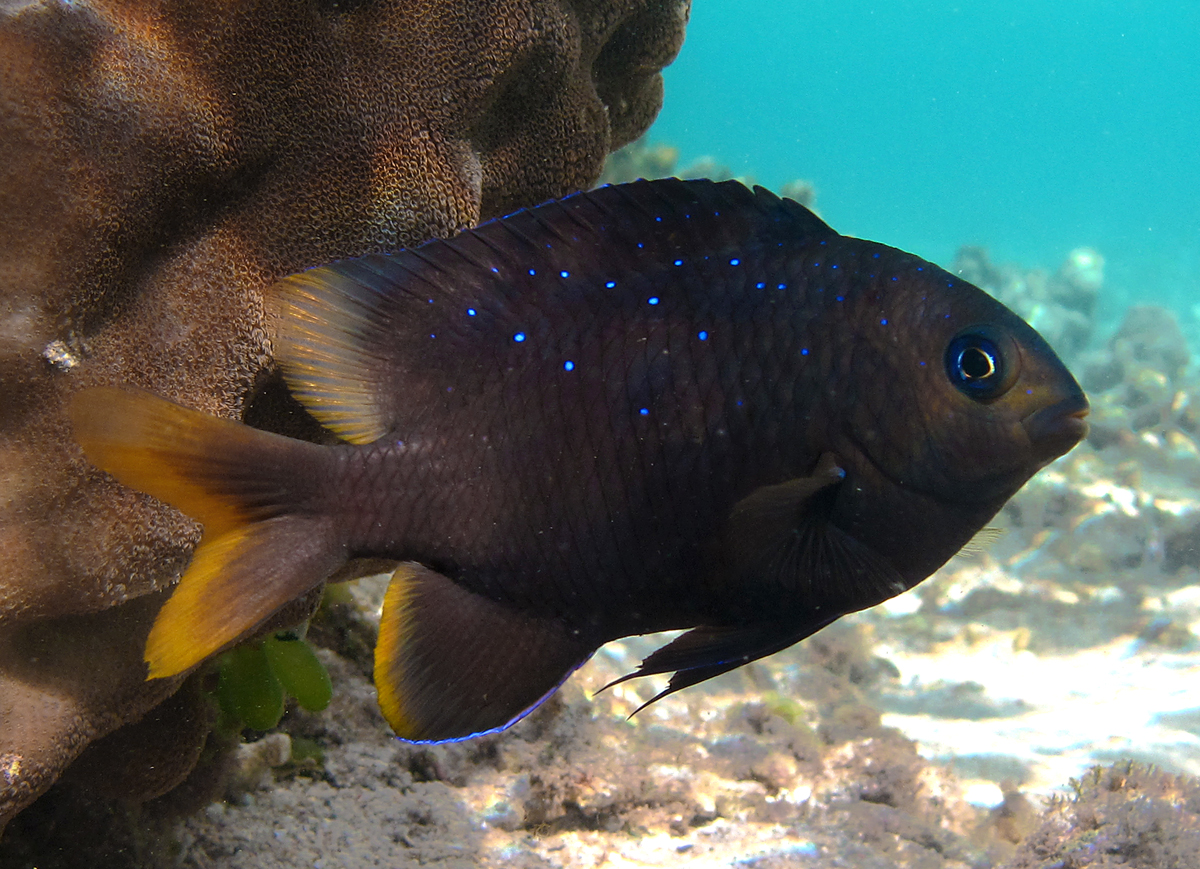

Scientific classification
- Kingdom: Animalia
- Phylum: Chordata
- Class: Actinopterygii
- Order: Blenniiformes
- Family: Pomacentridae
- Genus: Stegastes
- Species: S. pelicieri

Binomial name
- Stegastes pelicieri Allen & Emery, 1985

= Stegastes pelicieri =

Species of fish

Stegastes pelicieri, commonly known as the Mauritian gregory, is a damselfish of the family Pomacentridae. It is native to the islands of Mauritius and Réunion in the western Indian Ocean where it is found at depths between two and twenty metres (seven to sixty-five feet). It lives on rocky reefs in areas with little coral but plenty of holes and crevices.
