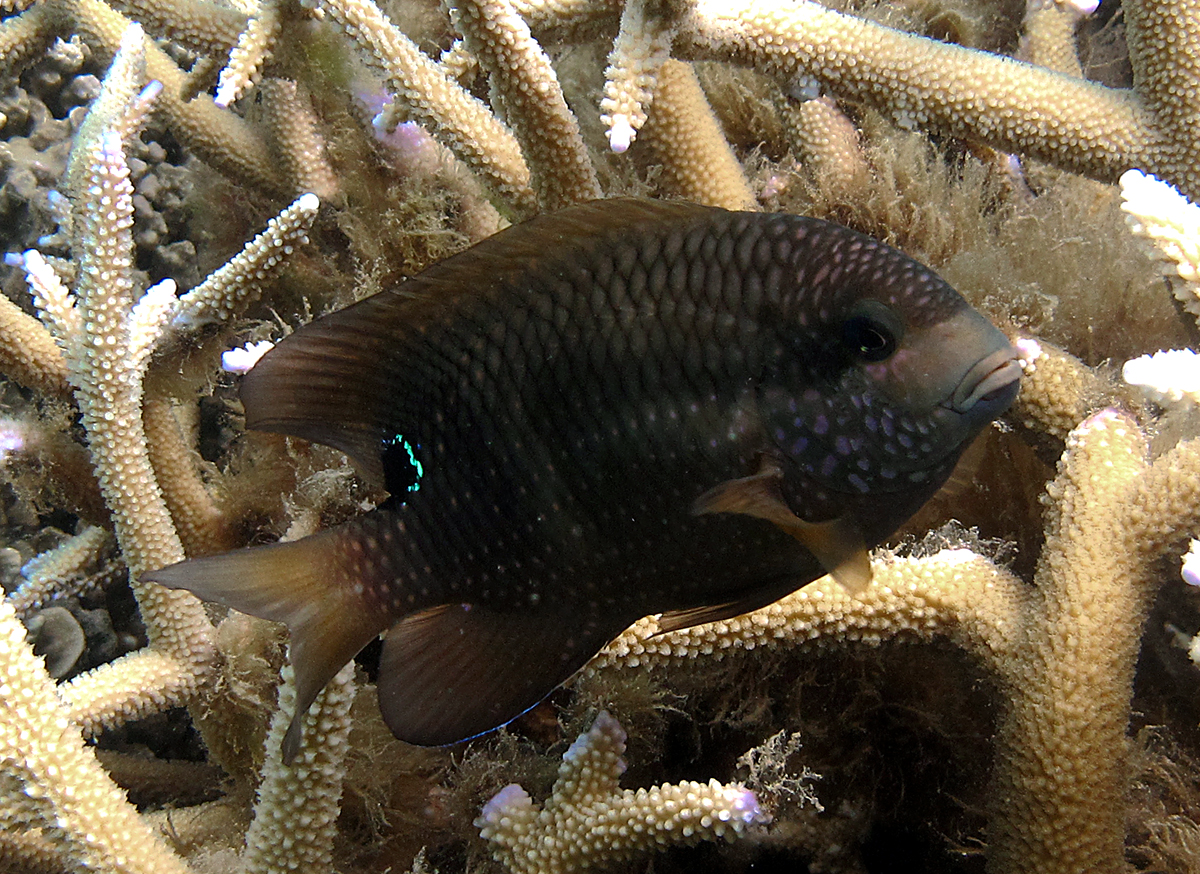

Conservation status
- Least Concern (IUCN 3.1)

Scientific classification
- Kingdom: Animalia
- Phylum: Chordata
- Class: Actinopterygii
- Order: Blenniiformes
- Family: Pomacentridae
- Genus: Stegastes
- Species: S. punctatus

Binomial name
- Stegastes punctatus (Quoy & Gaimard, 1825)

Synonyms
- Pomacentrus punctatus Quoy & Gaimard, 1825; Pomacentrus prosopotaenioides Bleeker, 1852; Pomacentrus cyanospilos Bleeker, 1853; Pomacentrus kumkum Montrouzier, 1857; Eupomacentrus kumkum (Montrouzier, 1857); Pomacentrus obscurus Thiollière, 1857

= Stegastes punctatus =

Species of fish

Stegastes punctatus, commonly known as the blunt snout gregory, is a damselfish of the family Pomacentridae. It is native to the Indo-Pacific region where it is found at depths down to 5 m (16 ft). Its range extends from the East African coast and the Red Sea to the Line Islands, the Society Islands, the Ryukyu Islands, the Bonin Islands, New Caledonia, Tonga and Micronesia. It is a very territorial species and drives other fish away from its "garden" of filamentous algae.
