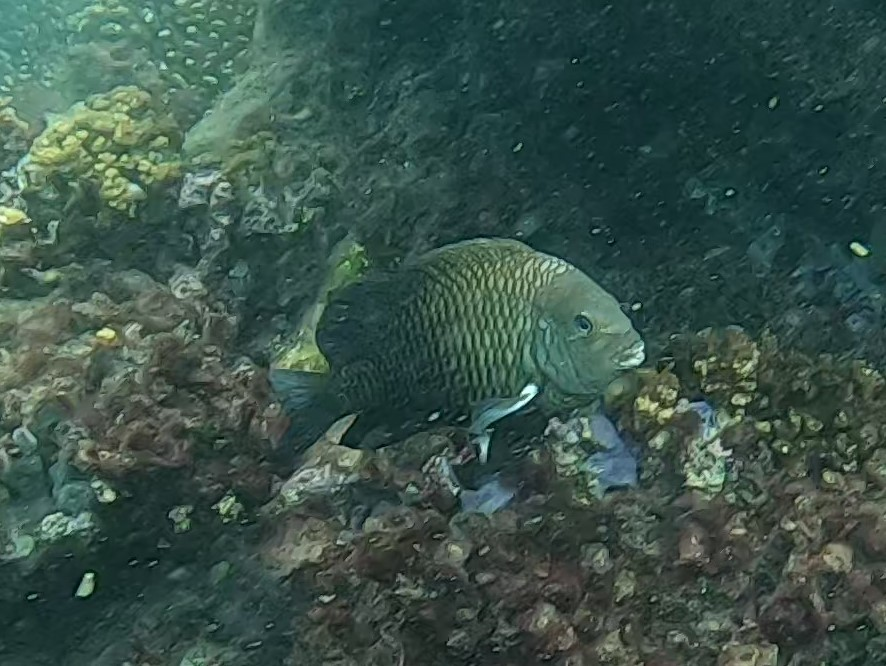

Conservation status
- Least Concern (IUCN 3.1)

Scientific classification
- Kingdom: Animalia
- Phylum: Chordata
- Class: Actinopterygii
- Order: Blenniiformes
- Family: Pomacentridae
- Genus: Stegastes
- Species: S. acapulcoensis

Binomial name
- Stegastes acapulcoensis (Fowler, 1944)

Synonyms
- Pomacentrus acapulcoensis Fowler, 1944

= Stegastes acapulcoensis =

Species of fish

Stegastes acapulcoensis, commonly called the Acapulco major, the Acapulco damselfish, or the Acapulco gregory, is a species of damselfish of the family Pomacentridae. It is native to the eastern Pacific Ocean.

== Distribution and habitat ==
S. acapulcoensis is native to the tropical and subtropical eastern Pacific Ocean. Its range extends from Baja California and Mexico to the Cocos Islands, the Galapagos Islands, and Lobos de Afuera Island in the Lambayeque Region of Peru. It is found on or near reefs at depths down to about 16 m (52 ft). It is often found over sandy seabeds and in tide pools, but also sometimes in rocky or coralline habitats.

== Ecology ==
This fish feeds on algae. Stegastes acapulcoensis farms and guards algae in its territory.

== Status ==
Stegastes acapulcoensis is common in many parts of its range and in the Galapagos Islands the population seems to be increasing. No particular threats have been identified and the IUCN rate it as being of "least concern".
