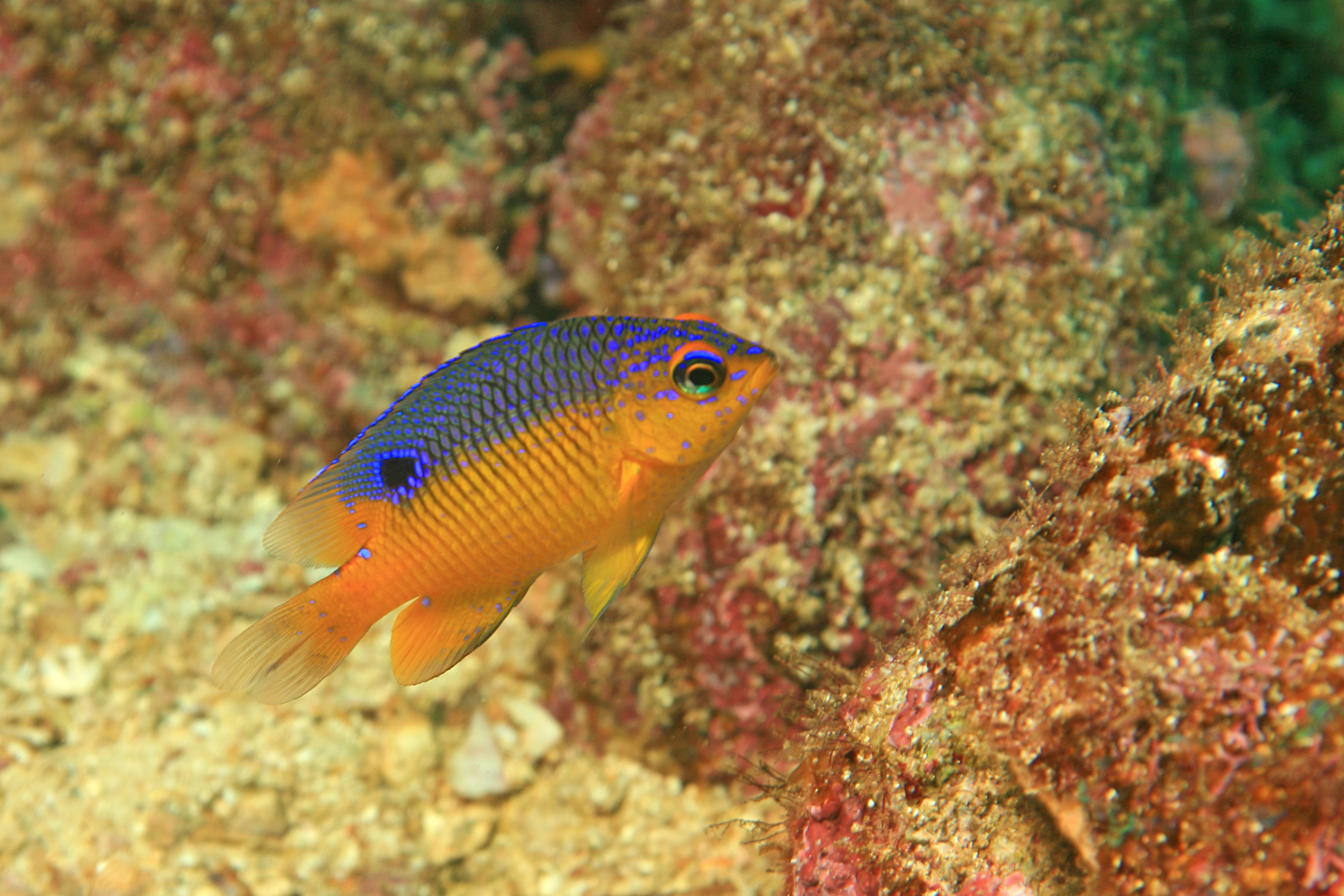
- juvenile

Conservation status
- Least Concern (IUCN 3.1)

Scientific classification
- Kingdom: Animalia
- Phylum: Chordata
- Class: Actinopterygii
- Order: Blenniiformes
- Family: Pomacentridae
- Genus: Stegastes
- Species: S. flavilatus

Binomial name
- Stegastes flavilatus (Gill, 1862)

Synonyms
- Pomacentrus flavilatus Gill, 1862; Pomacentrus gilli Gilbert & Starks, 1904

= Stegastes flavilatus =

Species of fish

Stegastes flavilatus, commonly known as beaubrummel, is a damselfish of the family Pomacentridae. It is native to the tropical eastern Pacific Ocean, its range extends from Mexico, Baja California and the Gulf of California southwards to the Galapagos Islands and mainland Ecuador. It is found on rocky inshore reefs at depths ranging from 1 to 10 m (3 ft 3 in to 32 ft 10 in).

== Status ==
Stegastes flavilatus has a wide distribution and is common in many parts of its range, particularly the mainland coast, but less common around the Revillagigedo Islands, the Galapagos and Cocos Islands, and its populations appear to be stable. No particular threats to this species have been identified and the IUCN rates it as being of "Least Concern".
