= Stegastes uenfi =

Conservation status
- Data Deficient (IUCN 3.1)

Scientific classification
- Kingdom: Animalia
- Phylum: Chordata
- Class: Actinopterygii
- Order: Blenniiformes
- Family: Pomacentridae
- Genus: Stegastes
- Species: S. uenfi

Binomial name
- Stegastes uenfi Novelli, Nunan & Lima, 2000

Species of fish

Stegastes uenfi, the grizzed gregory, is a damselfish of the family Pomacentridae. It is native to the tropical West Atlantic Ocean where it is found at depths of about 3 m (10 ft). It is known only from the coast of Brazil. The specific nae derives from the initials of the Unive Estadual do Norte Fluminense, the University that two of the authors were associated with.
