= Stegastes sanctaehelenae =

Conservation status
- Least Concern (IUCN 3.1)

Scientific classification
- Kingdom: Animalia
- Phylum: Chordata
- Class: Actinopterygii
- Order: Blenniiformes
- Family: Pomacentridae
- Genus: Stegastes
- Species: S. sanctaehelenae

Binomial name
- Stegastes sanctaehelenae (Sauvage, 1879)

Synonyms
- Pomacentrus sanctaehelenae Sauvage, 1879

Species of fish

Stegastes sanctaehelenae is a species of fish in the family Pomacentridae. It is endemic to Saint Helena.
