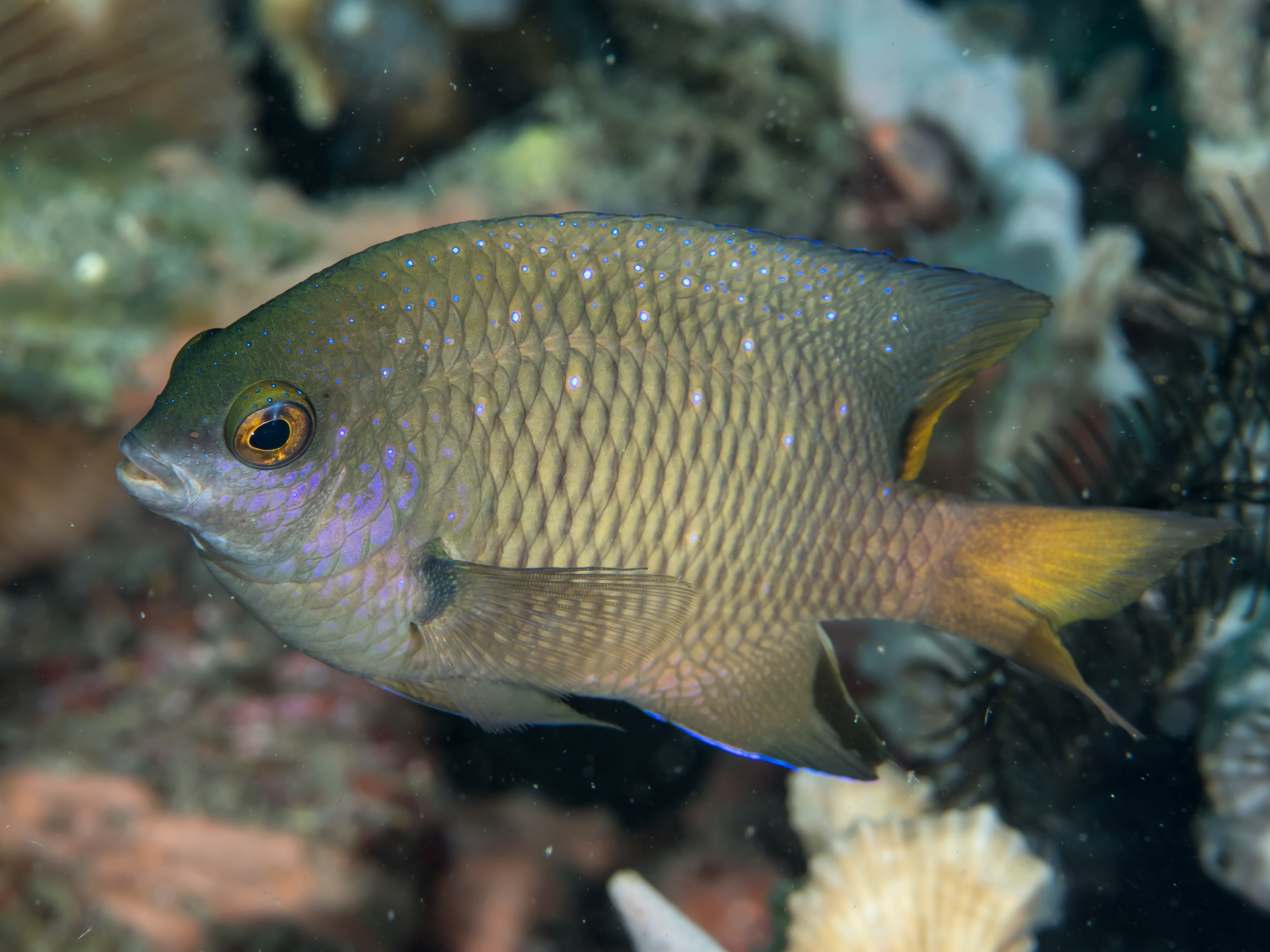

Conservation status
- Least Concern (IUCN 3.1)

Scientific classification
- Kingdom: Animalia
- Phylum: Chordata
- Class: Actinopterygii
- Order: Blenniiformes
- Family: Pomacentridae
- Genus: Stegastes
- Species: S. lacrymatus

Binomial name
- Stegastes lacrymatus (Quoy and Gaimard, 1825)

Synonyms
- Abudefduf florulentus (Günther, 1862); Abudefduf lacrymatus (Quoy & Gaimard, 1825); Glyphidodon florulentus Günther, 1862; Glyphisodon lacrymatus Quoy & Gaimard, 1825; Glyphisodon nivosus Hombron & Jacquinot, 1853; Plectroglyphidodon lacrymatus (Quoy & Gaimard, 1825)

= Stegastes lacrymatus =

Species of fish

Stegastes lacrymatus, the whitespotted devil, also known as the jewel damselfish, lives in the Indo-Pacific and can grow up to 10 centimetres (3.9 in) in length.
