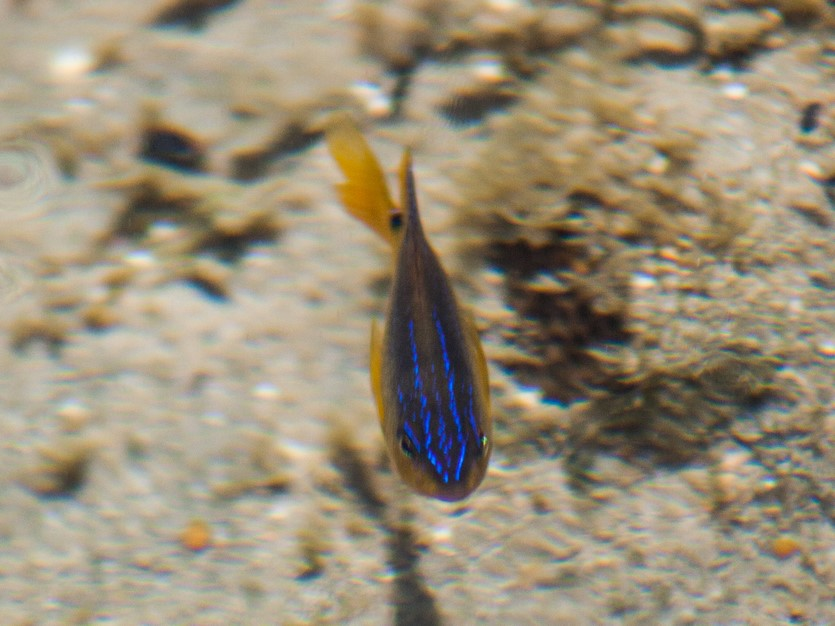

Conservation status
- Least Concern (IUCN 3.1)

Scientific classification
- Kingdom: Animalia
- Phylum: Chordata
- Class: Actinopterygii
- Division: Teleostei
- Order: Blenniiformes
- Family: Pomacentridae
- Genus: Stegastes
- Species: S. variabilis

Binomial name
- Stegastes variabilis (Castelnau, 1855)

Synonyms
- Pomacentrus variabilis Castelnau, 1855; Eupomacentrus variabilis (Castelnau, 1855); Pomacentrus flaviventer Troschel, 1865; Eupomacentrus chrysus T.H. Bean, 1906

= Stegastes variabilis =

Species of fish

Stegastes variabilis, commonly known as the Brazilian cocoa damselfish, is a species of damselfish in the family Pomacentridae, found on coral reefs in the western Atlantic Ocean and off Brazil. They are often solitary fish.

== Taxonomy ==
The genus name is Greek for stegastos, which means covered. Formerly, the Caribbean cocoa damselfish was considered as conspecific with the Brazilian cocoa damselfish, but the population from the Caribbean is genetically very distinct from it.

== Description ==
The Brazilian cocoa damselfish is an oval, laterally compressed fish and grows to about 12.5 centimetres (4.9 in) long. The top of the head and the snout bear several blue stripes. The top of the body is generally dark brown or blue or brown and shades to yellow below. The sides are finely barred with obliquely vertical dark lines. There are two small black spots, one above the pectoral fins and the other on the top of the caudal peduncle. The large dorsal fin has 12 spines and 14 to 17 soft rays. The anal fin has two spines and 12 to 15 soft rays. The caudal fin is shallowly forked and has rounded lobes.

== Distribution and habitat ==
Brazilian cocoa damselfish are found in the western Atlantic by Brazil. They are marine and reef-associated. They do not migrate and have a depth range of 0 to 30 m.

== Ecology and behaviour ==
=== Feeding ===
Adults feed mainly on benthic algae but also on sponges, ascidiacea and anemones, while juveniles feed on invertebrates such as harpacticoid copepods and nemerteans.

=== Breeding ===
In the breeding season, the female lays eggs on the seabed where they are attached to empty shells, stones or other objects and fertilized by the male. He then guards them, aerates them and chases away intruders. They are aggressive when breeding. Also there is distinct pairing during breeding.
