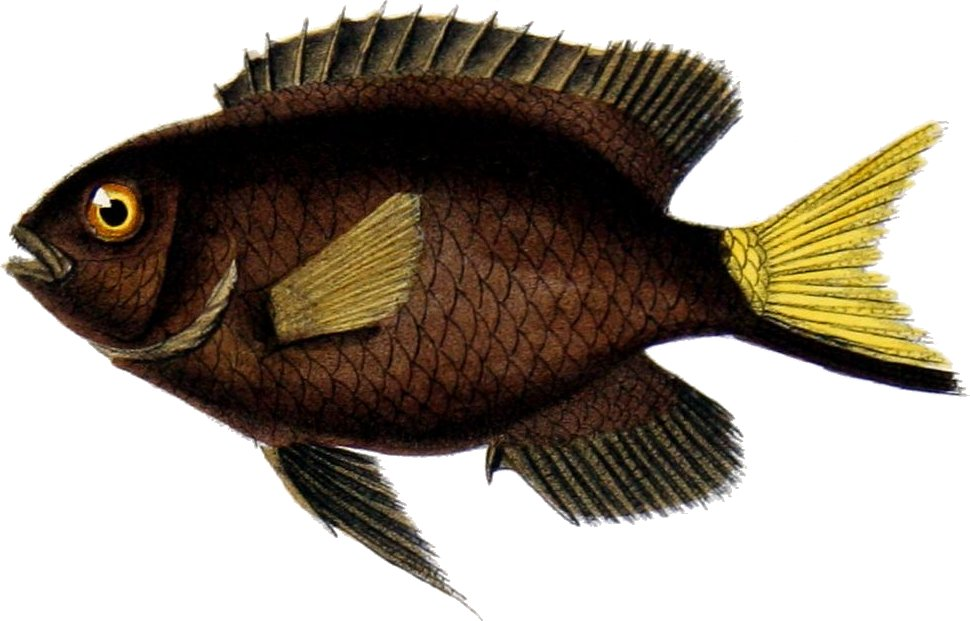
- Adult yellowtip damselfish

Conservation status
- Least Concern (IUCN 3.1)

Scientific classification
- Kingdom: Animalia
- Phylum: Chordata
- Class: Actinopterygii
- Division: Teleostei
- Order: Blenniiformes
- Family: Pomacentridae
- Genus: Stegastes
- Species: S. pictus

Binomial name
- Stegastes pictus (Castelnau, 1855)

Synonyms
- Pomacentrus pictus Castelnau, 1855

= Stegastes pictus =

Species of fish

Stegastes pictus, the yellowtip damselfish, is a species of damselfish found near the sea bed on shallow rocky reefs off the coast of Brazil, where it is endemic. It is a small, laterally-compressed, dark brown fish with yellow pectoral and caudal fins. It feeds on algae and detritus and is often found in the vicinity of the fire coral Millepora alcicornis. It is a territorial fish and forms a pair bond in the breeding season. The eggs are laid in a shallow scoop on the seabed and the male tends them to keep them well-aerated.

== Description ==
S. pictus is deep-bodied and laterally compressed, and grows to about 7.5 cm (3.0 in) in length. It is a dark brownish-black colour with yellow eyes, yellow pectoral and tail fins and a pale edge to the gill covers. The large dorsal fin has 12 spines and about 15 soft rays. The anal fin has two spines and about 14 soft rays. The paired pectoral and pelvic fins have only soft rays. There are 19 or 20 scales on the lateral line and about 20 gill rakers. The mouth is at the tip of the snout.

== Biology ==
S. pictus is a demersal fish and a territorial species, which guards an area of sea floor on which it grazes algae and eats detritus. It is often found associated with the fire coral, Millepora alcicornis. It is preyed upon by the trumpetfish, Aulostomus maculatus.

Yellowtip damselfish form pair bonds at breeding time. The eggs are laid on the sea bed and the male guards them and fans them as they develop to increase their oxygen supply.
