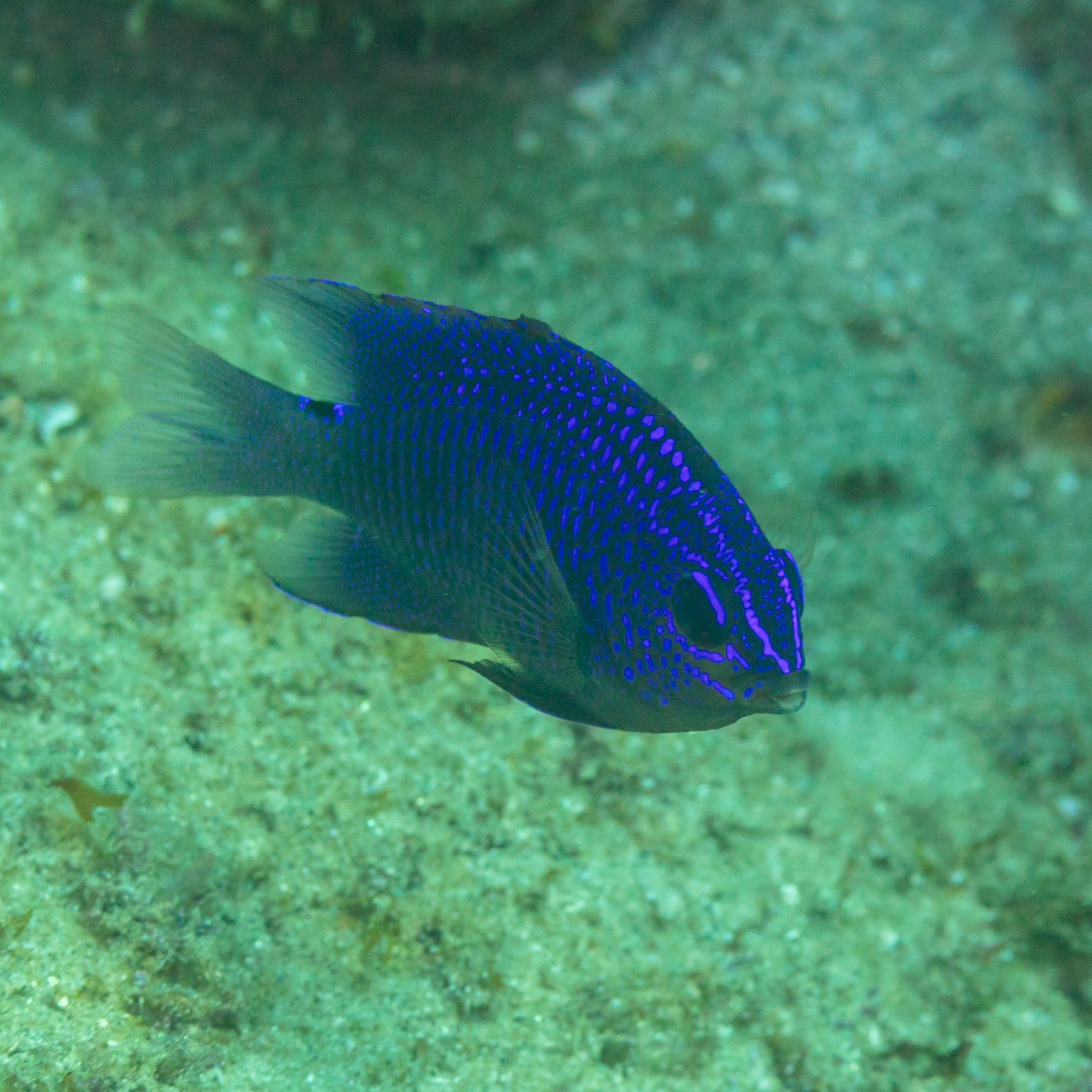

Conservation status
- Least Concern (IUCN 3.1)

Scientific classification
- Kingdom: Animalia
- Phylum: Chordata
- Class: Actinopterygii
- Order: Blenniiformes
- Family: Pomacentridae
- Genus: Stegastes
- Species: S. rectifraenum

Binomial name
- Stegastes rectifraenum (Gill, 1862)

Synonyms
- Pomacentrus rectifraenum Gill, 1862; Pomacentrus analigutta Gill, 1862; Abudefduf nigripinnis Borodin, 1928

= Stegastes rectifraenum =

Species of fish

Stegastes rectifraenum, commonly known as the Cortez damselfish or Cortez gregory, is a damselfish of the family Pomacentridae. It is native to the tropical eastern Pacific Ocean, its range including Baja California in Mexico, and the Gulf of California. It is found on rocky inshore reefs at depths ranging from 1 to 10 m (3 ft 3 in to 32 ft 10 in).

== Status ==
Stegastes rectifraenum has a wide distribution and is common in many parts of its range and its populations appear to be stable. No particular threats have been identified and the IUCN rate it as being of "Least Concern".
