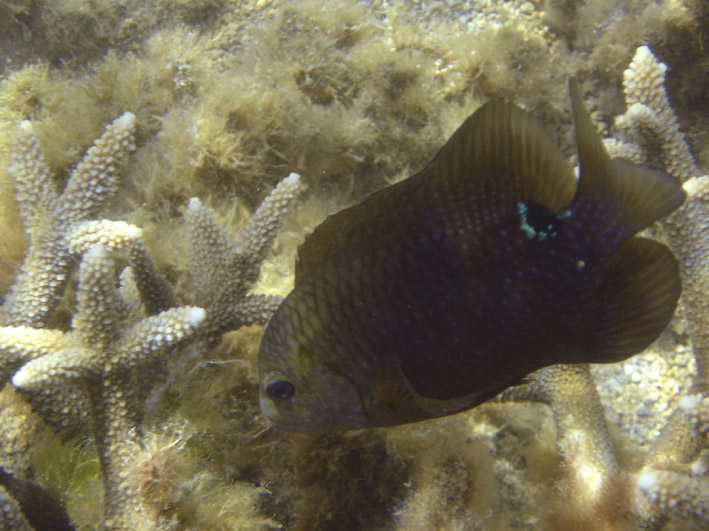

Conservation status
- Least Concern (IUCN 3.1)

Scientific classification
- Kingdom: Animalia
- Phylum: Chordata
- Class: Actinopterygii
- Division: Teleostei
- Order: Blenniiformes
- Family: Pomacentridae
- Genus: Stegastes
- Species: S. nigricans

Binomial name
- Stegastes nigricans (Lacépède, 1802)

Synonyms
- Holocentrus nigricans Lacepède, 1802; Eupomacentrus nigricans (Lacepède, 1802); Parapomacentrus nigricans (Lacepède, 1802); Pomacentrus nigricans (Lacepède, 1802); Pomacentrus scolopseus Quoy & Gaimard, 1825; Pomacentrus taeniops Cuvier, 1830; Pomacentrus scolopsis Günther, 1862; Pomacentrus subniger De Vis, 1885; Abudefduf tamaii Aoyagi, 1941

= Stegastes nigricans =

Species of fish

Stegastes nigricans, the dusky farmerfish, is a species of damselfish found around coral reefs at a depth of one to 12 meters, in tropical climates between 30°S and 30°N. They are known for farming monocultures of algae such as cyanophores and rhodophytes.

== Description ==
Stegastes nigricans was first described and named by Gerald Robert "Gerry" Allen and Alan R. Emery in 1985. The genus Stegastes is derived from the Greek "stegastos," which means on or covered. Nigricans is Greek for swarthy and black-skinned. Recent research has placed S. nigricans in the damselfish subfamily Pomacentrinae.

It has an average length of 9.0 cm, but can reach lengths of 14.0 cm. It has 12 dorsal spines, and 15 to 17 dorsal soft rays. It also has 2 anal spines and 12 to 14 anal soft rays. Adults are generally brown, with the dorsal parts of the head and nape being darker, grading to tan on the lower parts of the head and breast. The scales have darker brown margins. The lips are whitish, the suborbital is mostly blue, and the preopercle and opercle scales have blue centers. The median and pelvic fins are brown, the pectorals are dusky, and sometimes there's a well-defined dark brown or blackish spot at the base of the posteriormost dorsal rays, which distinguishes it from the S. lividus, where the spot is diffuse. When males are in courtship or guarding their eggs they have a broad white bar across the middle of the body and a pale blue stripe from the mouth to the upper part of the pectoral fin.

== Distribution ==
S. nigricans are found naturally in and around coral reefs. Adult S. nigricans inhabit reef flats and lagoon reefs in colonies in areas with staghorn coral. S. nigricans are limited by water temperature and their diet and have been experiencing a negative impact of their population amounts. Climate and ocean composition has been changing due to global warming and fossil fuel use, therefore this habitat is being altered and coral reefs are becoming greatly reduced.

S. nigricans is most frequently found across the coast of East Africa and around Madagascar; in the British Indian Ocean Territory and the southern coasts of India; across Southeast Asia, the northern coast of Australia; and Melanesia, Micronesia and Polynesia. They can also be found less frequently in the Red Sea, the Persian Gulf, the Gulf of California, and across the Western coast of Central America.

== Biology ==
Adults inhabit reef flats and lagoon reefs. They frequently occur in colonies associated with live or dead branching staghorn coral (Acropora). They feed on algae, gastropods, sponges and copepods. They are territorial, and they maintain and "weed" filamentous algae patches growing on dead coral. They attack human intruders without hesitation, sometimes taking painful nips.

S. nigricans are oviparous and follow a distinct breeding pair relationship between males and females. Their eggs are demeral and adhere to the substrate. Males guard and tend to the egg nest via aeration and will be visited by several females throughout their time there. They're particularly aggressive during reproductive periods. During aggressive encounters, they emit clicking noises. Males guard and tend the nest, visited by several females.

== Behavior ==
S. nigricans practices a form of agriculture with a species of red algae. The fish will claim a patch of algae which it defends by chasing away other fish and sea urchins. The fish also pulls up other bits of algae that attempt to grow in the patch and swims outside of its territory to spit the invading algae out. S. nigricans do not have cellulases in their stomach, therefore they dispose of algae that they cannot digest. They must limit their diet to cyanophores and rhodophytes, which are delicate species. There are nine algae species that S. nigricans will farm for, and the algae they remove is competitively superior late-colonizing algae as opposed to the algae they can eat. They also remove algae that is competitive and faster growing than their preferred delicate algae. When the fish claiming a patch is removed, the patch is eaten up within a few days. When a patch of "brown carpet algae" (Womersleyella setacea) is caged to keep both S. nigricans and other fish out of the patch, other species of algae quickly overwhelm the patch. This seems to indicate the brown carpet algae are dependent on S. nigricans for its survival. The presence of S. nigricans in ecosystems greatly increases the primary productivity of the area by boosting oxygen, nitrogen, and phosphorus concentrations.
