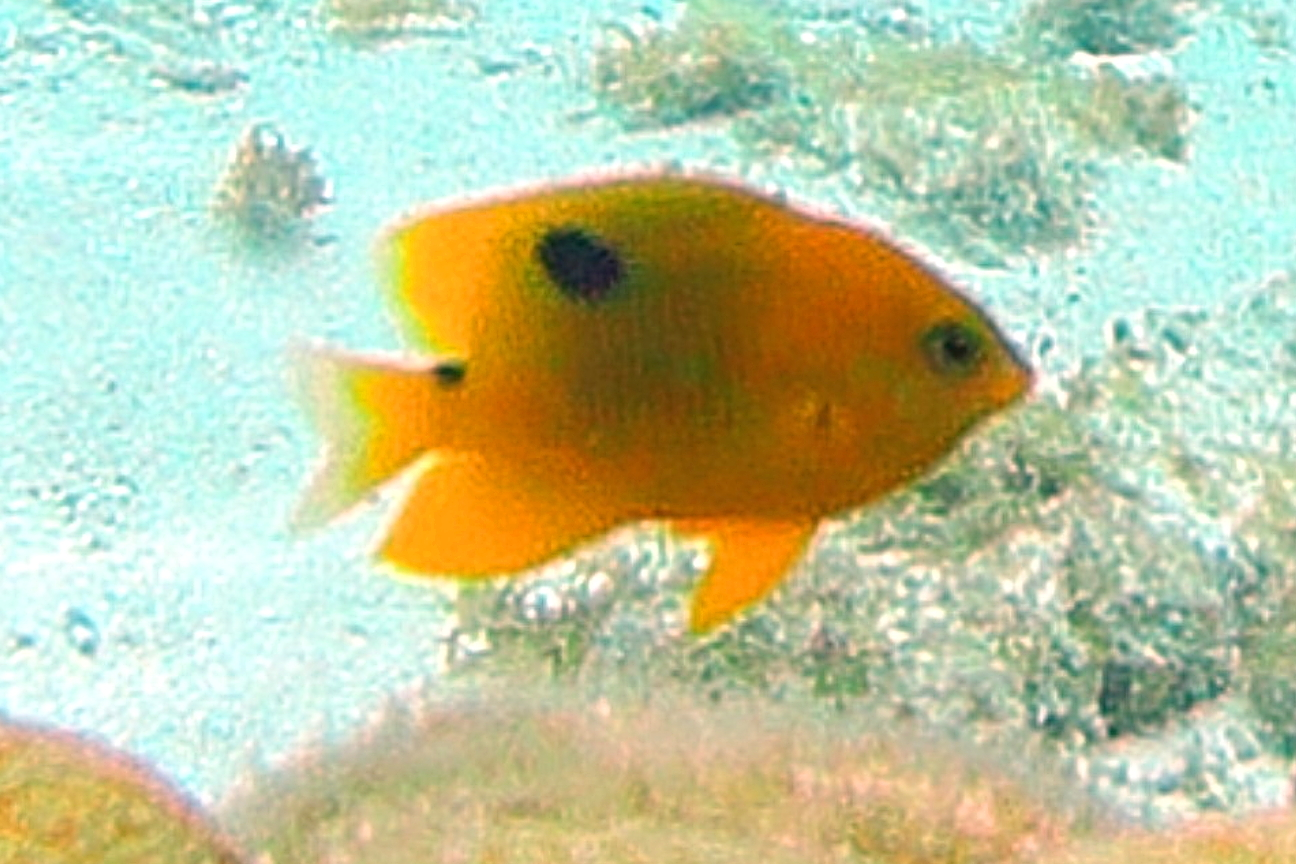
- Threespot damselfish seen in Key Largo, Florida

Conservation status
- Least Concern (IUCN 3.1)

Scientific classification
- Kingdom: Animalia
- Phylum: Chordata
- Class: Actinopterygii
- Division: Teleostei
- Order: Blenniiformes
- Family: Pomacentridae
- Genus: Stegastes
- Species: S. planifrons

Binomial name
- Stegastes planifrons (Cuvier, 1830)

= Stegastes planifrons =

Species of fish

Stegastes planifrons (threespot damselfish) is a damselfish from the Western Atlantic. It occasionally makes its way into the aquarium trade.

== Description ==
The adult threespot damselfish is a brownish-grey, bony fish with a dusky yellow sheen and a large black spot at the base of the pectoral fins. It grows to 13 cm in length. The large dorsal fin has 12 spines and 15–17 soft rays. The anal fin has two spines and 13–14 soft rays. Neither the pectoral nor pelvic fins have spines.

Juveniles are a much brighter yellow. They have a few tiny blue spots on the head and upper body, including one on the upper iris. They have three distinctive black spots, one at the junction between the dorsal fin spines and the soft rays, one dorsally on the caudal peduncle, and a third smaller one just above the base of the pectoral fins. These tend to have a faint blue rim, and the pectoral spot is absent in very young juveniles, becoming more prominent as the juvenile grows.

== Distribution and habitat ==
The threespot damselfish is found down to about 30 m (98 ft) in the western Atlantic Ocean. Its range extends from Florida through the Caribbean Sea to the Bahamas. It is a demersal fish, and its favoured habitats are inshore and offshore coral reefs. It is often found among staghorn coral and at night may be found in caves.

== Biology ==
Threespot damselfish feed mainly on seaweed, but also eat copepods, gastropod molluscs and their eggs, hydroids, marine worms, and sponges.

Adults vigorously maintain large territories, chasing away and nipping intruders, including humans. A male and female will form a breeding pair. The female lays eggs which stick to objects on the seabed, and the male guards these and oxygenates them by fanning them with its fins.
