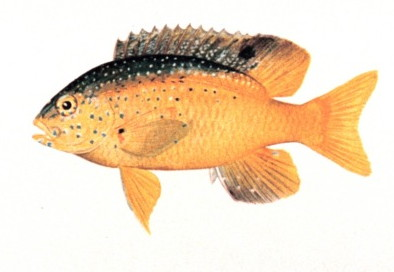

Conservation status
- Least Concern (IUCN 3.1)

Scientific classification
- Kingdom: Animalia
- Phylum: Chordata
- Class: Actinopterygii
- Division: Teleostei
- Order: Blenniiformes
- Family: Pomacentridae
- Genus: Stegastes
- Species: S. leucostictus

Binomial name
- Stegastes leucostictus (Castelnau, 1855)

Synonyms
- Eupomacentrus leucostictus (J.P. Müller & Troschel, 1848); Eupomacentrus nepenthe Nichols, 1921; Pomacentrus analis Poey, 1868; Pomacentrus atrocyaneus Poey, 1860; Pomacentrus leucostictus Müller & Troschel, 1848

= Stegastes leucostictus =

Species of fish

Stegastes leucostictus is a species of damselfish found near the sea bed in shallow waters on the western fringes of the Atlantic Ocean. It is commonly known as the beau gregory or beaugregory.

== Description ==
Stegastes leucostictus is a fairly deep-bodied, oval, laterally compressed bony fish, and grows to about 10 cm (3.9 in) long. It is rather variable in colour, but is generally dark blue or brown along the top of the head and the ridge of the back and yellowish on the flanks. The large dorsal fin has 12 spines and 13 to 16 soft rays. The anal fin has two spines and 12 to 14 soft rays. The caudal fin has a shallow fork and the paired pectoral and pelvic fins have no spines. The mouth is set at the tip of the snout.

A juvenile S. leucostictus has blue stripes and spots on its head and a dull blue sheen on the top of the head and the upper part of the front half of the body. It has a large, black eye-spot ringed in blue, centered where the dorsal fin spines join the soft rays. As the juvenile develops, this spot moves upwards onto the fin. Also, a dark spot just above each pectoral fin distinguishes this species from others in the genus.

== Distribution and habitat ==
Stegastes leucostictus is found in shallow waters at depths down to about 10 m (33 ft) in the western Atlantic Ocean. Its range extends from Florida and the Gulf of Mexico south to Brazil. It is a demersal fish, normally remaining within 50 cm of the seabed. Its favoured habitats are seagrass meadows, rocky or coral reefs and sandy flats and it is sometimes found amongst mangroves.

== Biology ==
Stegastes leucostictus feeds mainly on seaweed, but also consumes marine worms, amphipods, foraminiferans and gastropod molluscs. A male damselfish guards a territory, but seldom interacts with its neighbours, although it will attack a male of the same species introduced in a bottle placed in its territory. Dominance is related to the quality of the territory it occupies. The owner of a high-quality territory exhibits dominance and if it is removed and a subservient male moves in, it in turn develops dominance.

During the breeding season, a male and a female form a pair bond. The eggs are hidden inside an empty shell or under a stone, and the male guards the nest and fans the eggs with its fins to keep them well oxygenated.

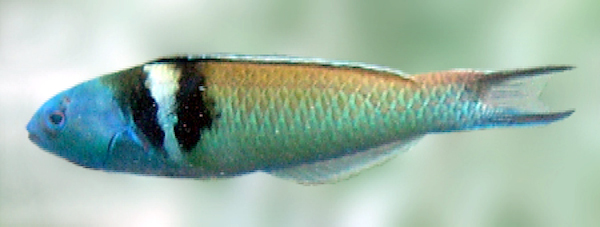
The bluehead eats the eggs of S. leucostictus.

The wrasse, Thalassoma bifasciatum (bluehead), preys upon the eggs of S. leucostictus. A male damselfish can evaluate the level of the threat posed by one or more wrasse and react appropriately. It either chases the other fish, harries it, or adopts a head-lowered, threatening posture.
