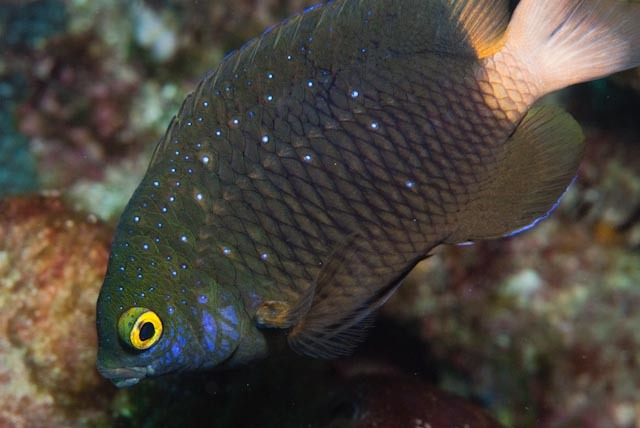
- Stegastes lacrymatus

Scientific classification
- Domain: Eukaryota
- Kingdom: Animalia
- Phylum: Chordata
- Class: Actinopterygii
- Order: Blenniiformes
- Family: Pomacentridae
- Subfamily: Pomacentrinae
- Genus: Stegastes; Jenyns, 1840

Type species
- Stegastes imbricatus Jenyns, 1840

Synonyms
- Brachypomacentrus Bleeker, 1877; Eupomacentrus Bleeker, 1877

= Stegastes =

Genus of fishes

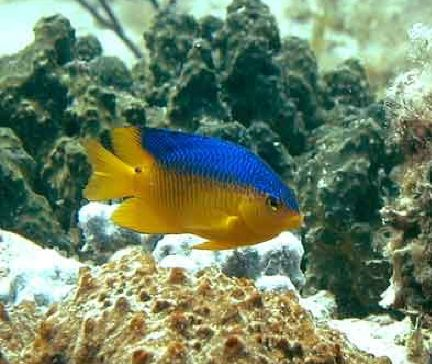
Caribbean cocoa damselfish (Stegastes xanthurus)

Stegastes, commonly known as Gregories, is a genus of ray-finned fish in the family Pomacentridae. Members of this genus are marine coastal fishes except for S. otophorus, which also occurs in brackish water. These fish are known by the names of damselfish, gregory and major. They are small tropical fish associated with coral and rocky reefs in the Atlantic, Indian and Pacific Oceans. They are sometimes found in the aquarium trade where they are an easy-to-keep fish, but they do not mix well with other fish of their own or other species because of their territorial habits and aggressiveness.

== Description ==
The largest species in the genus is S. acapulcoensis, which grows to a maximum length of 17 cm (7 in), while the smallest is S. pictus at 7.5 cm (3.0 in). Members of this genus are deep-bodied and laterally flattened fish with forked tails. The head has a blunt snout, a small, terminal mouth, a nostril on each side of the face, and large eyes. The lateral line does not run the full length of the body and has gaps in it. A single large dorsal fin is present and the anal fin has two, or rarely three, spines. The colour varies with the species and sometimes varies in different parts of the fish's range. Juvenile fish tend to have bright colours which are completely different from the appearance of adults of that species. The brown color of Stegastes apicalis was shown to arise from melanosomes containing pheomelanin unlike most fish species's melanosomes that contain eumelanin.

== Behaviour ==
These damselfish feed on filamentous algae which make up about 90% of their diet, although they may consume detritus and some invertebrate material, possibly ingesting it accidentally with the algae. They are territorial and cultivate the algae, guarding their garden from other fish. Most species of Stegastes live a solitary existence, though some live in association with a member of the opposite sex and a few form loose aggregations of a small number of individuals. They tend not to face too much competition from other fish because of the very shallow water in which they live and because their habitat is not actually on reefs, but is near them, among boulders, dead branching corals, man-made structures, and junk. Most species are very aggressive and attack anything that moves into their territory, including nipping divers to drive them away.

Their behaviour changes somewhat during the breeding season. The male prepares a nesting site by cleaning a smooth piece of rock, removing algae and debris, and removing or driving away from the vicinity unwanted invertebrates such as starfish and sea urchins. He then signals his readiness to breed by changing hue and displaying his brighter colours. A female that accepts his advances lays a single layer of eggs which she attaches to the prepared rock. The male fertilises them and then stays to guard them, removing any debris that lands on them or unfertilised eggs and fanning the developing embryos with his fins to keep them well oxygenated. The eggs hatch in about a week, the larvae drifting away as part of the plankton. About a month later, they settle to the seabed and undergo metamorphosis into juveniles, well away from the territories occupied by the adults.

== In the aquarium ==
Stegastes species may be offered to new aquarists on the grounds that they are easy to care for. They will indeed tolerate poor water quality and feed on the algae which is often a nuisance in reef tanks, but because of their aggressive behaviour, they should not be kept with other fish, especially smaller ones.

== Species ==
FishBase lists the following species:

Species	Common name	Adult	Juvenile
Stegastes acapulcoensis (Fowler, 1944)			
Stegastes adustus (Troschel in Müller, 1865)			
Stegastes albifasciatus (Schlegel and Müller, 1839)			
Stegastes arcifrons (Heller and Snodgrass, 1903)			
Stegastes baldwini Allen and Woods, 1980			
Stegastes beebei (Nichols, 1924)			
Stegastes diencaeus (Jordan and Rutter, 1897)			
Stegastes flavilatus (Gill, 1862)	beaubrummel		
Stegastes fuscus (Cuvier in Cuvier and Valenciennes, 1830)	dusky damselfish		
Stegastes imbricatus Jenyns, 1840			
Stegastes lacrymatus (Quoy and Gaimard, 1825)			
Stegastes leucorus (Gilbert, 1892)			
Stegastes leucostictus (Müller and Troschel in Schomburgk, 1848)			
Stegastes limbatus (Cuvier in Cuvier and Valenciennes, 1830)			
Stegastes lividus (Forster in Bloch and Schneider, 1801)			
Stegastes lubbocki Allen and Smith, 1992			
Stegastes nigricans (Lacépède, 1802)			
Stegastes otophorus (Poey, 1860)	freshwater gregory		
Stegastes partitus (Poey, 1868)			
Stegastes pelicieri Allen and Emery, 1985			
Stegastes pictus (Castelnau, 1855)			
Stegastes planifrons (Cuvier in Cuvier and Valenciennes, 1830)			
Stegastes punctatus (Quoy & Gaimard, 1825)			
Stegastes rectifraenum (Gill, 1862)			
Stegastes redemptus (Heller and Snodgrass, 1903)			
Stegastes rocasensis (Emery, 1972)			
Stegastes sanctaehelenae (Sauvage, 1879)			
Stegastes uenfi Novelli, Nunan and Lima, 2000			
Stegastes variabilis (Castelnau, 1855)	cocoa damselfish		
Stegastes xanthurus Poey, 1860			
