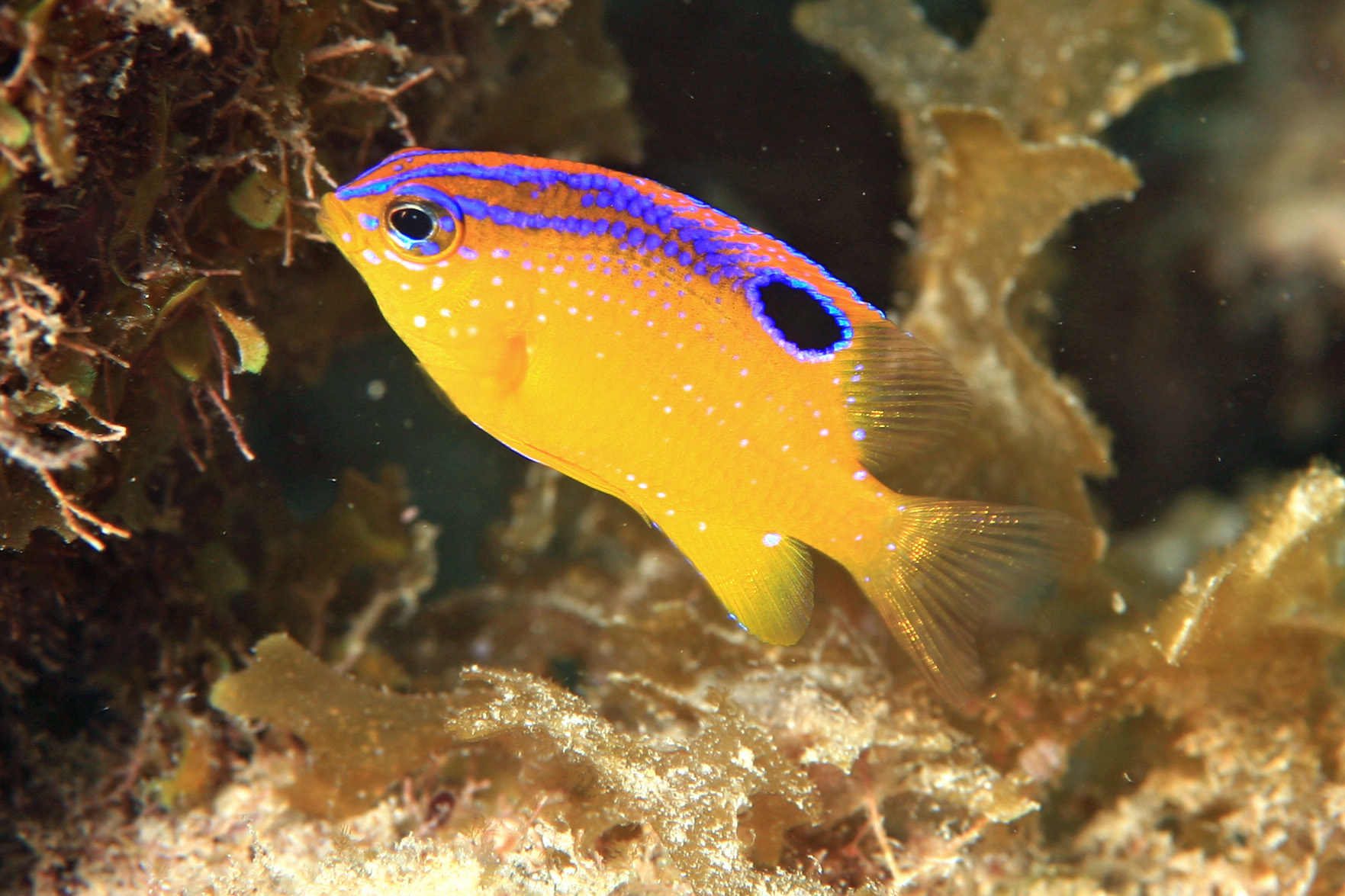
- juvenile
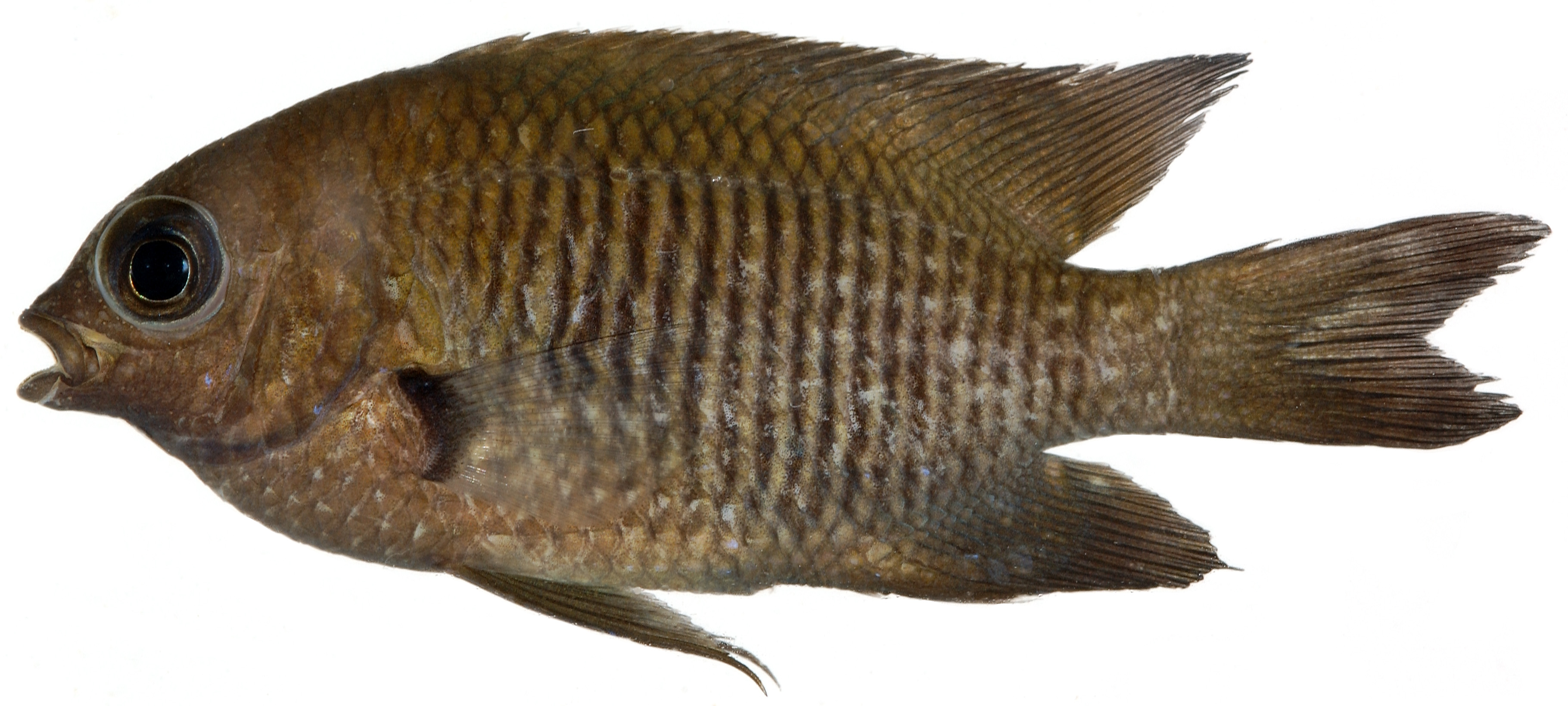
- adult

Conservation status
- Least Concern (IUCN 3.1)

Scientific classification
- Kingdom: Animalia
- Phylum: Chordata
- Class: Actinopterygii
- Division: Teleostei
- Order: Blenniiformes
- Family: Pomacentridae
- Genus: Stegastes
- Species: S. diencaeus

Binomial name
- Stegastes diencaeus (D.S. Jordan & Rutter, 1897)

Synonyms
- Eupomacentrus diencaeus Jordan & Rutter, 1897; Pomacentrus diencaeus (Jordan & Rutter, 1897); Eupomacentrus mellis Emery & Burgess, 1974; Stegastes mellis (Emery & Burgess, 1974)

= Stegastes diencaeus =

Species of fish

Stegastes diencaeus, the longfin damselfish, is a damselfish in the family Pomacentridae from the Western Atlantic. It occasionally makes its way into the aquarium trade. It grows to a size of 12.5 cm in length. Longfin damselfish have been reported to have a mutualistic relationship with mysid shrimp of the species Mysidium integrum. The interaction is described as a form of domestication with the shrimp providing nutrients for the algae farms the fish feed on and the fish providing protection from predators.

== See also ==
- Non-human agriculture
