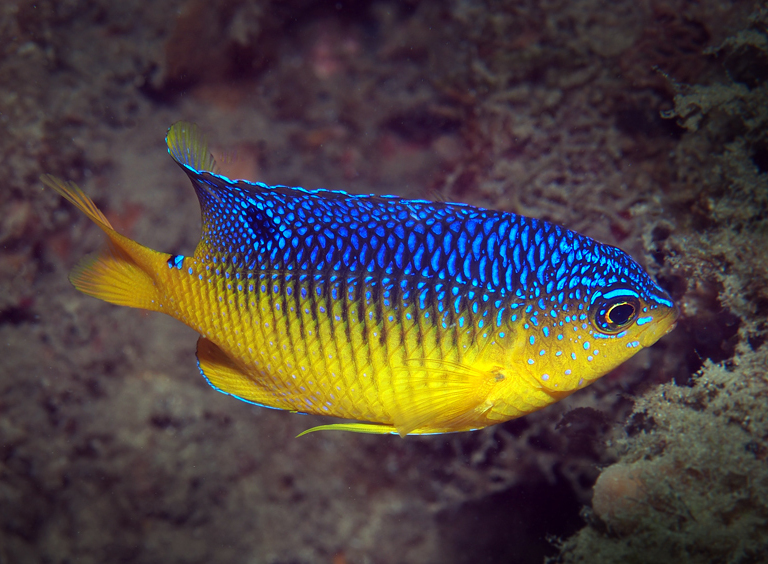

Conservation status
- Least Concern (IUCN 3.1)

Scientific classification
- Kingdom: Animalia
- Phylum: Chordata
- Class: Actinopterygii
- Division: Teleostei
- Order: Blenniiformes
- Family: Pomacentridae
- Genus: Stegastes
- Species: S. xanthurus

Binomial name
- Stegastes xanthurus (Poey, 1860)

Synonyms
- Pomacentrus xanthurus Poey, 1860

= Stegastes xanthurus =

Species of fish

Stegastes xanthurus, also known as the Caribbean cocoa damselfish, is a species of damselfish in the family Pomacentridae, found on coral and rocky reefs in the Caribbean Sea and neighboring areas of the Atlantic Ocean and Gulf of Mexico.

== Taxonomy ==
The genus name is Greek for stegastos, which means covered. This species was formerly considered as conspecific with the Brazilian cocoa damselfish.

== Description ==
The Caribbean cocoa damselfish is an oval, laterally compressed fish and grows to about 12.5 centimetres (4.9 in) long. The top of the head and the snout bear several blue stripes. The top half of the body is generally dark blue or brown and the bottom half is yellow. The sides are finely barred with vertical dark lines. There are two small black spots, one above the pectoral fins and the other on the top of the caudal peduncle. The large dorsal fin has 12 spines and 14 to 17 soft rays. The anal fin has two spines and 12 to 15 soft rays. The caudal fin is shallowly forked and has rounded lobes.

Juveniles have a number of tiny blue spots and stripes on the head and upper part of the body, including two spots and a stripe on the upper iris. These regions also have a dusky blue sheen. A blue-rimmed black eyespot is located where the dorsal fin spines join with the soft rays. A similar blue-rimmed spot is found at the top of the caudle peduncle, and it extends down nearly as far as the lateral line. Older juveniles develop the characteristic blue and yellow coloration of the adult.

== Distribution ==
Caribbean cocoa damselfish are found in the western central Atlantic from the Florida Keys and the Gulf of Mexico to northern South America. They are marine and reef-associated. It is common on offshore reefs, oil platforms, and wrecks. The juveniles can occasionally appear inshore.

== Ecology and behaviour ==
Individual Stegastes variabilis do not overlap territories with other damselfish. They appear to survive longer in captivity, up to 18 years, whereas they do not live beyond 12 years in the wild.

=== Breeding ===
In the breeding season, the female lays eggs on the seabed where they are attached to empty shells, stones or other objects and fertilized by the male. He then guards them, aerates them and chases away intruders. The males do this for seven days. Most of the communication between this species is done during breeding season.

== Importance to humans ==
They are used as commercial aquarium fish because of their size and colorfulness.
