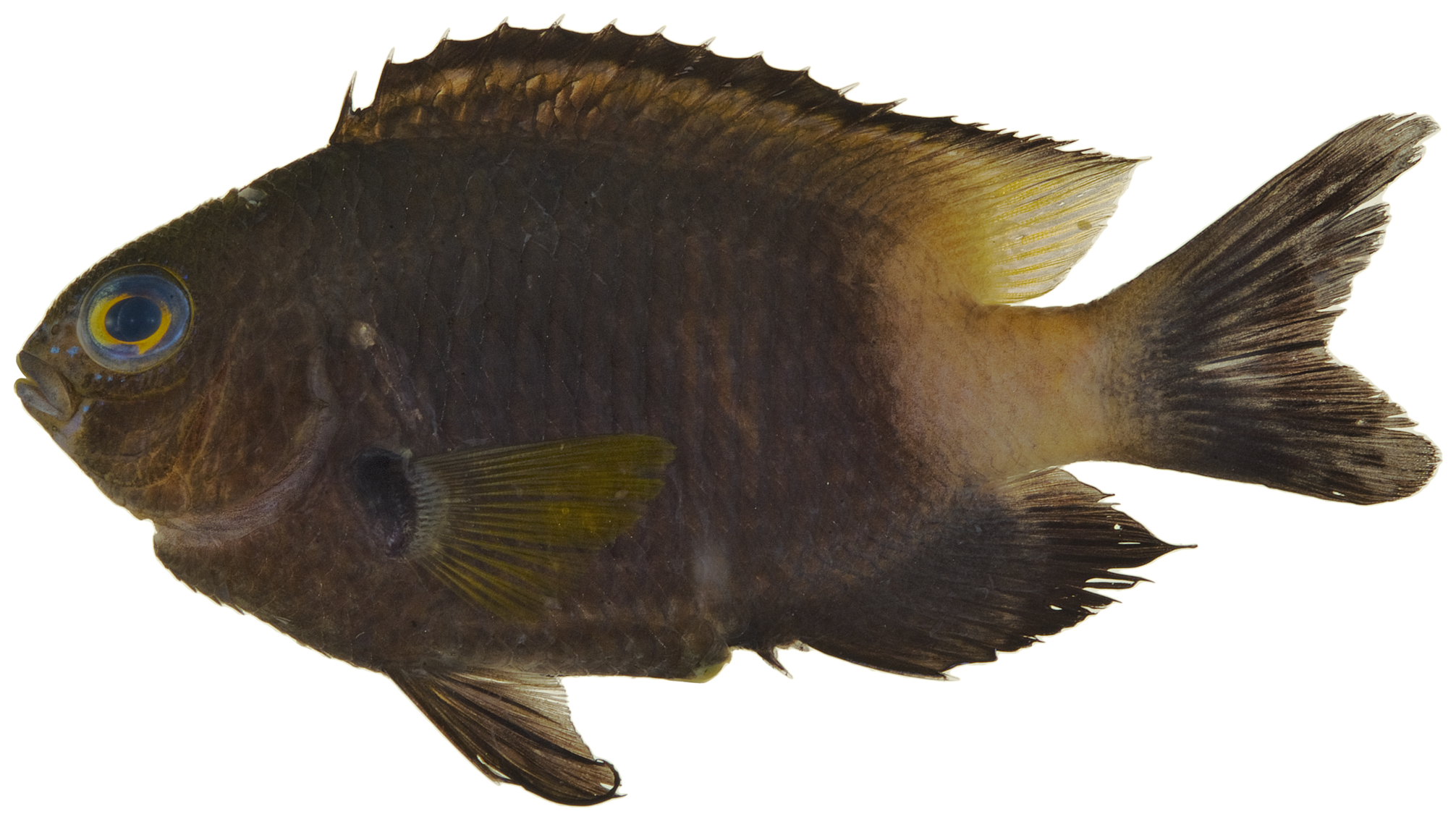

Conservation status
- Least Concern (IUCN 3.1)

Scientific classification
- Kingdom: Animalia
- Phylum: Chordata
- Class: Actinopterygii
- Order: Blenniiformes
- Family: Pomacentridae
- Genus: Stegastes
- Species: S. partitus

Binomial name
- Stegastes partitus (Poey, 1868)

Synonyms
- Eupomacentrus partitus (Poey, 1868); Pomacentrus freemani Beebe & Tee-Van, 1928; Pomacentrus partitus Poey, 1868

= Stegastes partitus =

Species of fish

Stegastes partitus or the bicolor damselfish is a species of bony fish in the family Pomacentridae found near the sea bed on shallow rocky and coral reefs in the Caribbean Sea, the Gulf of Mexico and off the coasts of Florida.

== Description ==
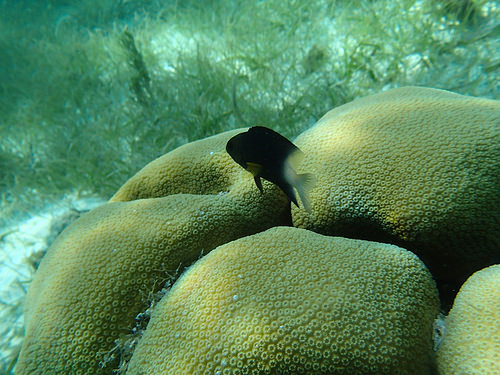
A bicolor damselfish in Belize

The bicolor damselfish can grow to about 10 cm (3.9 in). The head and the front half of the body are dark grey or black and the rear half is pale, usually with some yellow, with regional variations in the coloring. The large dorsal fin has 12 spines and 14-17 soft rays. The anal fin is also large and has two spines and 13-15 soft rays.

== Behaviour ==
Unlike most other members of the genus Stegastes which eat filamentous algae, the bicolor damselfish feeds on plankton. It forms loose groups of up to twenty individuals and defends a territory over a rocky reef with plenty of crevices in which to lurk.
