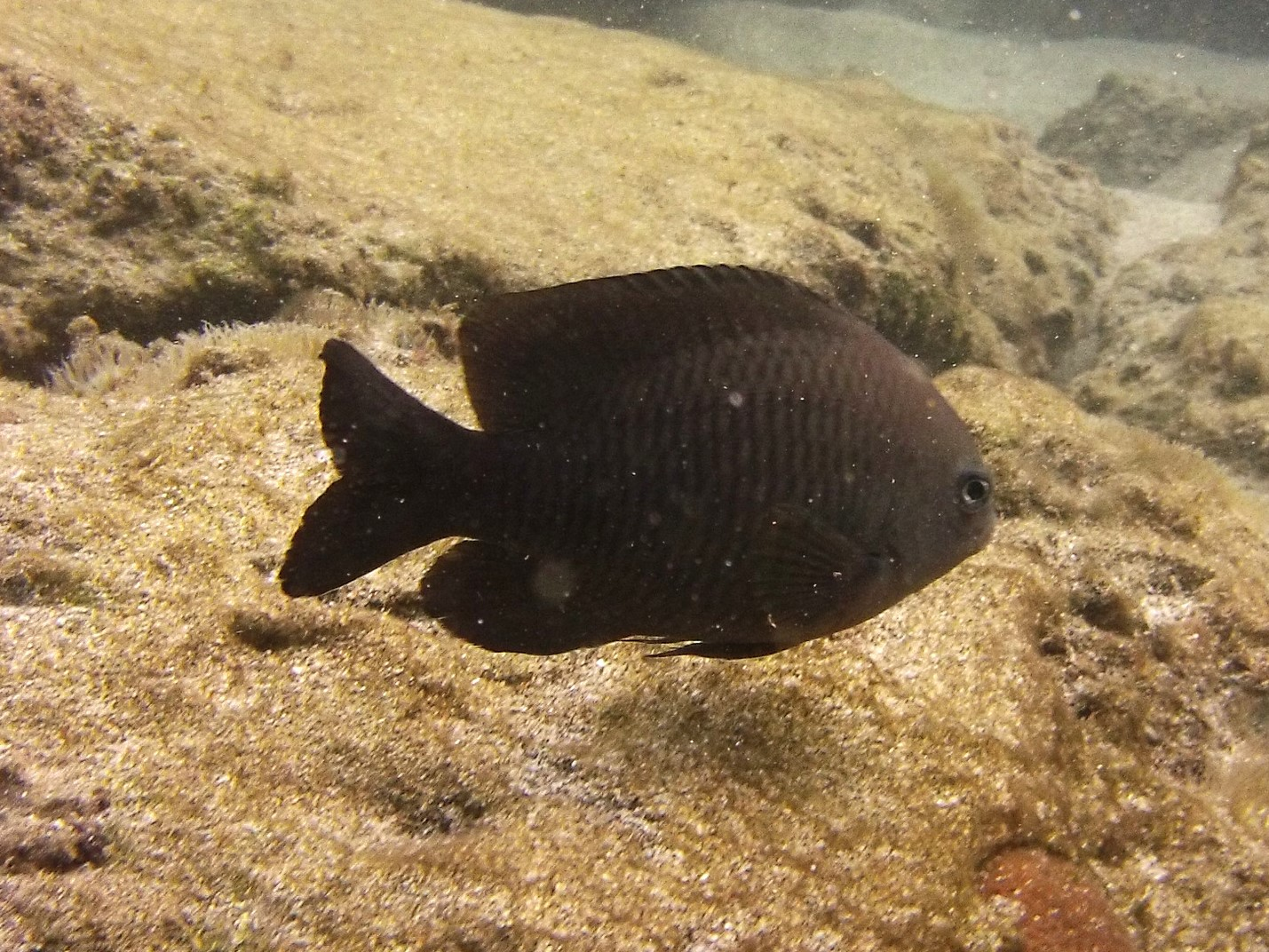

Conservation status
- Least Concern (IUCN 3.1)

Scientific classification
- Kingdom: Animalia
- Phylum: Chordata
- Class: Actinopterygii
- Division: Teleostei
- Order: Blenniiformes
- Family: Pomacentridae
- Genus: Stegastes
- Species: S. adustus

Binomial name
- Stegastes adustus (Castelnau, 1855)

Synonyms
- Pomacentrus adustus Troschel, 1865; Pomacentrus dorsopunicans Poey, 1868; Stegastes dorsopunicans (Poey, 1868); Pomacentrus obscuratus Poey, 1876; Eupomacentrus rubridorsalis Beebe & Hollister, 1933

= Stegastes adustus =

Species of fish

Stegastes adustus, also known as the dusky damselfish or scarlet-backed demoiselle, is a species of damselfish in the family Pomacentridae. It is found at one- to three-meter depths on surging and wavy coral reefs in the Caribbean Sea, the tropical waters of the western Atlantic Ocean, and the Gulf of Mexico.

== Feeding ==
Adults feed on algae, plants, and detritus. S. adustus exhibits different feeding behaviors between those that live in coral rubble and patch reef habitats.
