= Damselfish =

Group of fishes

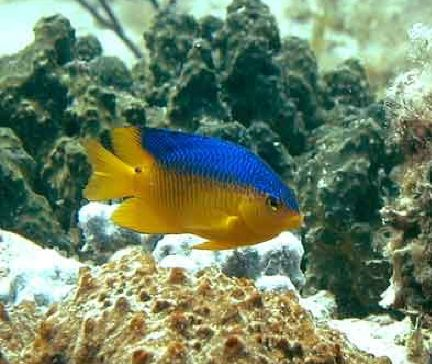
Cocoa damselfish (Stegastes xanthurus)

Damselfish are fish within the subfamilies Abudefdufinae, Chrominae, Lepidozyginae, Pomacentrinae, and Stegastinae within the family Pomacentridae.

Most species within this group are relatively small, although the four largest species (Hypsypops rubicundus, Microspathodon bairdii, M. dorsalis and Nexilosus latifrons) can reach 30 cm (12 in) in length. Most damselfish species exist only in marine environments, but a few inhabit brackish or fresh water. These fish are found globally in tropical, subtropical, and temperate waters.

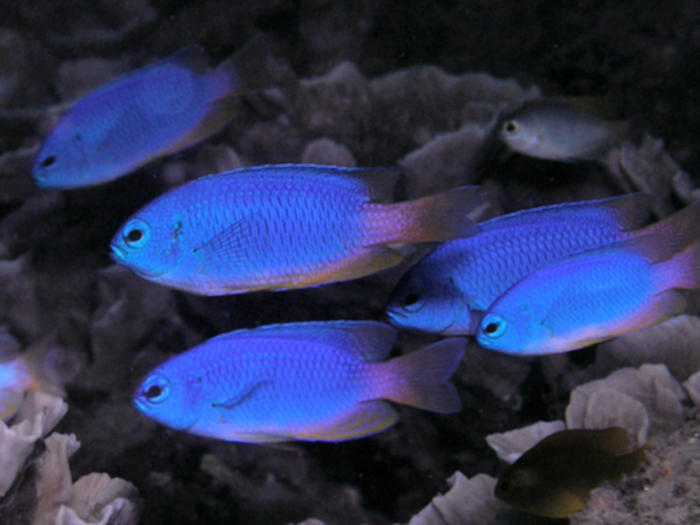
Neon damselfish from East Timor

== Habitat ==
Many species live in tropical rocky or coral reefs, and many of those are kept as marine aquarium pets. Their diets include small crustaceans, plankton, and algae. However, a few live in fresh and brackish waters, such as the freshwater damselfish, or in warm subtropical climates, such as the large orange Garibaldi, which inhabits the coast of southern California and the Pacific Mexican coast.

== Foraging ==
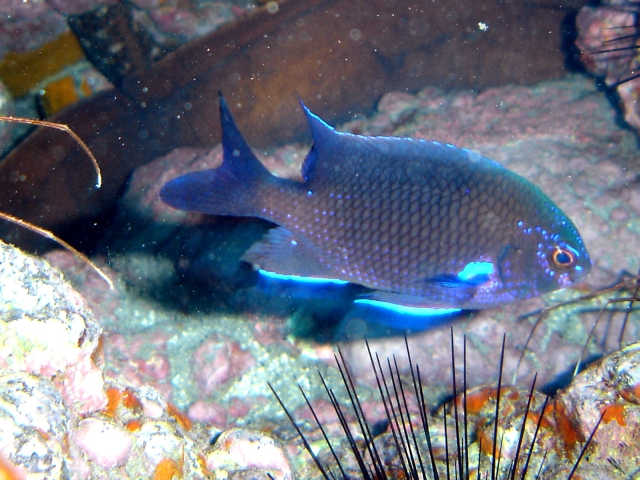
Canary damsel

The domino damselfish D. albisella spends the majority (greater than 85%) of its daytime hours foraging. Larger individuals typically forage higher in a water column than do smaller ones. Damselfish of all sizes feed primarily on caridea and copepods. Males have relatively smaller stomach sizes during spawning season compared to females due to the allocation of resources for courtship and the guarding of nests. When current speeds are low, the damselfish forages higher in a water column where the flux of plankton is greater and they have a larger food source. As current speeds increase, it forages closer to the bottom of the column. Feeding rates tend to be higher when currents are faster. Smaller fishes forage closer to their substrates than do larger ones, possibly in response to predation pressures.

== Territoriality ==
There are many examples of resource partitioning and habitat selection that are driven by aggressive and territorial behaviors in this group. For example, the threespot damselfish S. planifrons is very defensive of its territory and is a classic example of extreme territoriality within the group. One species, the dusky damselfish S. adustus spends the majority of its life within its territory.

== Domestication of mysid shrimps ==
Longfin damselfish (Stegastes diencaeus) around Carrie Bow Cay, Belize (16°48.15′N, 88°04.95′W), have been shown to actively protect planktonic mysids (Mysidium integrum) in their reef farms. The mysids fertilize the algae grown in the reef farms with their excretes which in turn helps the damselfish who feed on algae to be healthier. In the reef farms that house mysids, damselfish aggressively defend the farm area against other fish that would prey on the mysids, significantly more so than they do when their farms do not house mysid shrimps. These damselfish would eat similar small invertebrates. Despite that, they are docile towards mysid shrimp. In the area, mysid shrimps are not found in swarms except in the farms maintained by damselfish. All these observations point to a pet-like relationship between the mysid shrimps and longfin damselfish in the area, with damselfish being the domesticator and mysids being the domesticate.

== Courtship ==
In the species S. partitus, females do not choose to mate with males based on size. Even though large male size can be advantageous in defending nests and eggs against conspecifics among many animals, nest intrusions are not observed in this damselfish species. Females also do not choose their mates based upon the brood sizes of the males. In spite of the increased male parental care, brood size does not affect egg survival, as eggs are typically taken during the night when the males are not defending their nests. Rather, female choice of mates is dependent on male courtship rate. Males signal their parental quality by the vigor of their courtship displays, and females mate preferentially with vigorously courting males.

Male damselfish perform a courtship behavior called the signal jump, in which they rise in a water column and then rapidly swim back downward. The signal jump involves large amounts of rapid swimming, and females choose mates based on the vigor with which males do so. Females determine the male courtship rates using sounds that are produced during signal jumps. As the male damselfish swims down the water column, it creates a pulsed sound. Male courtship varies in the number and rates of those pulses.

In the beaugregory damselfish S. leucostictus males spend more time courting females that are larger in size. Female size is significantly correlated with ovary weight, and males intensify their courtship rituals for the more fecund females. Research has shown that males that mate with larger females do indeed receive and hatch greater numbers of eggs.

== Mating ==
Male bicolor damselfish, E. partitus, exhibit polygamy, often courting multiple females simultaneously. Among this species, evolutionary selection favors those males that begin mating as soon as possible during spawning seasons even if the most favorable egg clutches are spawned at later times. Females often choose which males to mate with depending on the males’ territory quality. Shelter sites are essential for the bicolor damselfish in avoiding predation, and females may evaluate the suitability of these sites at a male territory before depositing their eggs.

=== Effect of distance on spawning ===
In the species S. nigricans, females usually mate with a single male each morning during spawning seasons. At dawn, they visit males’ territories to spawn. The distance to the territory of a mate influences the number of visits that a female engages in with a male. At short distances, females make many repeated visits. At longer ones, they may spawn their entire clutch in one visit. This plasticity in mating behavior can be attributed to two factors: (1) intrusions by other fish to feed in the females’ territories while they are away, which could make the females return frequently to their habitats in order to defend their resources, and (2) predatory attacks on the females, which increase in frequency as the distances that the females travel become longer. Intrusion by other fish into a female’s territory can diminish the habitat of its food and render it unstable. Thus, a spawning female should return to its home as often as possible. However, a greater number of spawning visits increases the chance of being attacked, especially when mating with males that are far away. To minimize overall costs, females change their number of spawning visits depending on male territory distance.

== Filial cannibalism ==
The male cortez damselfish, S. rectifraenum, is known to engage in filial cannibalism. Studies have shown it typically consumes over twenty-five percent of its clutches. The males generally consume clutches that are smaller than average in size, as well as those that are still in the early stages of development. Female cortez damselfish tend to deposit their eggs with males who are already caring for early-stage eggs, rather than males with late-stage eggs. This preference is seen particularly in females that deposit smaller-sized clutches, which are more vulnerable to being consumed. For the males, filial cannibalism is an adaptive response to clutches that do not provide enough benefits to warrant the costs of parental care.
