= Hobart Zoo and Aquarium =

Zoo in Australia

- Interactive map of Hobart Zoo and Aquarium
- 42.7057°S 147.3762°E
- Date opened: 2 July 1999
- Land area: 90 ha (220 acres)
- Owner: Stuart Webster
- Website: https://www.hzaa.com.au/

Hobart Zoo and Aquarium is a privately owned zoological park located in Richmond, Tasmania, outside of Hobart. It was established in 1999 as Zoodoo Wildlife Park, initially focusing on native rescued and orphaned wildlife species. Over time, the zoo expanded its collection to include exotic animals such as African lions (one tawny-coated female and a white-coated male), neotropical monkeys, zebras, camels, porcupines and several others. In March 2020, the zoo became accredited by the Zoo Aquarium Association of Australasia and is assessed annually. in October 2026 Hobart Zoo & Aquarium got accreditation by World Association of Zoos and Aquariums. and the only private facility accredited by World Association of Zoo and Aquariums in Australia.

The zoo was listed for sale through Finn Business Sales with an asking price of $3,750,000. In September 2024, The Mercury reported that Stuart Webster had taken over the Tasmanian zoo.

In May 2025, the zoo changed its name from Zoodoo Wildlife Park to Hobart Zoo & Aquarium. 300 acres of land behind the facility has been turned into a protected area for threatened native vegetation as an ecology contribution initiative by the zoo's management.

== Animals ==
The zoo has expanded its animal collection continuously over twenty-five years (including the establishment of the aquarium complex in 2025) and the zoo's species are as follows:

Aquarium

- Bennett's toby
- Blue linckia
- Blue tang
- Blueface angelfish
- Bluestreak cleaner wrasse
- Half and half wrasse
- Borneo loach
- Brittle star
- Red-breasted wrasse
- Cherry barb
- Copperband butterflyfish
- Coral banded shrimp
- Coral beauty
- Epaulette shark
- Freshwater angelfish
- Golden-headed goby
- Golden moray eel
- Green chromis
- Half-and-half chromis
- Humbug damselfish
- Lawnmower blenny
- Lionfish
- Neon tetra
- Ocellaris clownfish
- Ocellate river stingray
- Orange rainbowfish
- Peacock Cichlid
- Phantom catfish
- Pictus catfish
- Pot-belly Seahorse
- Purple-lined fairy wrasse
- Pyramid butterflyfish
- Ram cichlid
- Red devil fish
- Red rainbowfish
- Redeye tetra
- Royal angelfish
- Rummy-nose tetra
- Sailfin tang
- Sea apple
- Warty Sea cucumber
- Collector sea urchin
- Silver dollarfish
- Slender danio
- Three-spot angelfish
- Tiger oscar
- Upside-down jellyfish
- Valentin's sharpnose puffer
- Werner's panchax
- White-eyed moray eel
- Yellow boxfish
- Yellow longnose butterflyfish
- Yellow tang
- Yellowtail damselfish
- Cardinal tetra
- Barbour's seahorse

Domestic & Farm Animals

- Alpaca
- Domestic rabbit
- Guinea pig
- Highland cattle
- Llama
- Miniature pony
- Red factor canary

Exotic Animals

- African lion (including a male white lion named Bakari)
- Blue-and-yellow macaw
- Bolivian squirrel monkey
- Brown capuchin monkey
- Cape porcupine
- Capybara
- Common marmoset
- Common peafowl
- Cotton-top tamarin
- Dromedary camel
- Emperor tamarin
- Fallow deer
- Fischer's lovebird
- Grant's zebra
- Meerkat
- Ostrich
- Ringneck parakeet
- Serval

Native Birds

- Australian king parrot
- Budgerigar
- Bush stone-curlew
- Cockatiel
- Eastern rosella
- Eclectus parrot
- Emu
- Little corella
- Major Mitchell's cockatoo
- Rainbow lorikeet
- Red-tailed black cockatoo
- Sulphur crested cockatoo
- Swift parrot
- Tawny frogmouth

Native Mammals

- Bennett's wallaby
- Common wombat
- Forester kangaroo
- Eastern quoll
- Long-nosed potoroo
- Spotted-tailed quoll
- Sugar glider
- Tasmanian brushtail possum
- Tasmanian devil
- Tasmanian echidna
- Tasmanian pademelon
- Tasmanian ringtail possum
- Koala

Reptiles

- Black-headed python
- Carpet python
- Eastern blue-tongued lizard
