= Hobart Zoo (disambiguation) =

Hobart Zoo may refer to two zoos in the region of the city of Hobart, Tasmania, Australia.

- Hobart Zoo, also known as Beaumaris Zoo, opened 1895 and closed in 1937.
- Hobart Zoo and Aquarium, also known Zoodoo Zoo, opened 1999.
