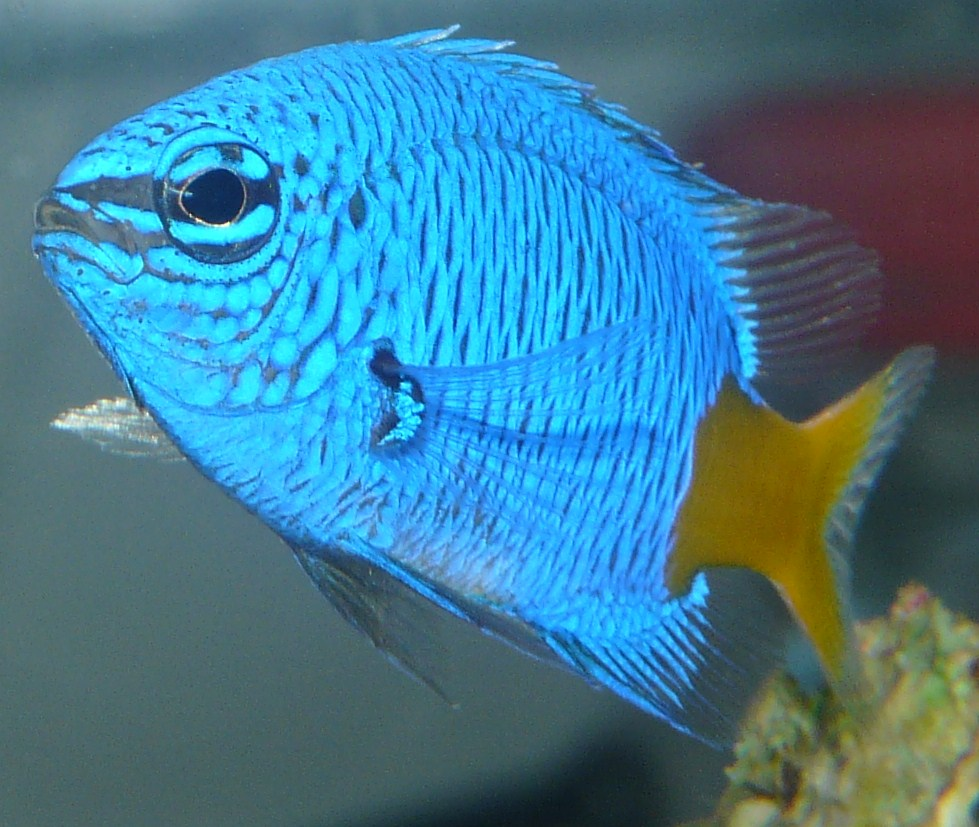

Conservation status
- Least Concern (IUCN 3.1)

Scientific classification
- Kingdom: Animalia
- Phylum: Chordata
- Class: Actinopterygii
- Order: Blenniiformes
- Family: Pomacentridae
- Genus: Chrysiptera
- Species: C. parasema

Binomial name
- Chrysiptera parasema (Fowler, 1918)

Synonyms
- Abudefduf parasema Fowler, 1918

= Chrysiptera parasema =

Species of fish

Chrysiptera parasema, also known as yellowtail damselfish, yellowtail blue damsel, goldtail demoiselle and other variations, is a saltwater species of fish from the Indo-Pacific. It was described by Henry Weed Fowler in 1918.

== Description ==
C. parasema is a small marine fish that reaches 2.8–3 in (7.1–7.6 cm) in length. It has a spiny dorsal fin and is laterally compressed.

=== Coloring ===
C. parasema is blue with a distinctive yellow caudal fin (tail fin). The yellow coloring may extend up to the back of the anal and dorsal fins, especially in species from Papua New Guinea. These fish may also have yellow pelvic or pectoral fins. However, yellow is never found on the backs or bellies of Yellowtail Blue damsels. A yellow belly likely indicates that the fish is actually an Azure demoiselle, whereas yellow areas on the nose or chin may indicate that it is a blue devil damsel.

== Habitat ==
Yellowtail blue damsels prefer densely populated coral groupings in sheltered lagoons and inshore reefs, and generally remain between at a depth of between 3–52 ft (1–16 m).

== Breeding and reproduction ==
In the wild, male C. parasema have their own territories, located near a nesting site. Each territory contains eggs from previous females. The females will swim around inspecting each male and its territory before choosing one based on its size and the number of eggs in its territory. As a part of the evaluation, the female will display a light ring around her eyes, and the male will respond with its own displays. The next day, the female will spawn with the chosen male. An individual male can have up to 10,000 eggs from different females. Males often abandon their territories to claim territories with more eggs, as this makes them appear more favorable to the females.

The eggs hatch after up to 4 days, depending on temperature, and the male is responsible for guarding and caring for the eggs. The subsequent larval stage can take 10 to 50 days.

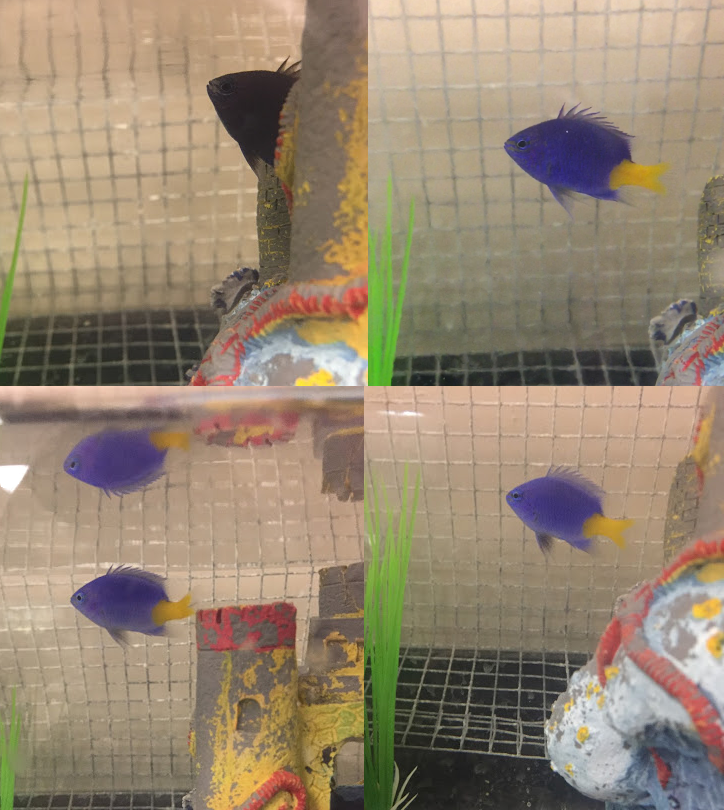
Various C. parasema colorations within the span of a few minutes. The dark coloration in the image at top left is an indication of stress, caused by the lights being turned on. The color gradually changed to light blue as the damselfish adjusted.

== Behavior and diet ==
Chrysiptera parasema contain chromatophores and can change color in response to external stimuli. When stressed, they can turn darker to conserve energy.

Adults are usually found alone or in pairs, while juveniles are more likely to remain in small groups.

C. parasema are omnivores. In nature, they feed on plankton, algae, and small benthic crustaceans.

== In the aquarium ==
Chrysiptera parasema is a popular fish in the saltwater aquarium hobby. Because of its usually low price it is often recommended as a way for novice marine aquarium keepers to gain experience. Though these hardy fish are sometimes used to cycle a tank, aquariums discourage against this practice, encouraging the use of live rock instead. Thirty gallons is typically quoted as the minimum tank size required to permanently house this fish. In a properly maintained tank, C. parasema will live for 4–6 years or longer, up to 15 years.

=== Behavior ===
C. parasema prefers peaceful tank mates and abundant hiding spots, as they are frequently preyed upon in nature. It is a favorite species among aquarists because it is active, but less aggressive than most damselfish.

However, these fish will sometimes harass more passive fish in an aquarium. In addition, despite its comparatively peaceful nature, this species can be territorial with members of its own species. They tend to become more aggressive when kept singly. This aggression can sometimes be reduced by keeping them in small groups of odd numbered fish (three to seven). They do show schooling behavior when kept in large groups.

Despite its hardy nature, C. parasema also must not be placed in an aquarium with larger predatory fish such as lionfish, and grouper which will often see it as a food source.

=== Diet ===
In captivity, C. parasema shows a preference for spirulina, flake foods, and mysis shrimps. However, they tend to go after most fish foods, whether frozen, freeze dried, or live. These fish tend to feed towards the bottom of the tank.

=== Reproduction ===
It is very difficult to tell the males apart from the females. In general, males may tend to be larger more slender, and will become more aggressive towards females when they are ready to mate. Males are ultimately responsible for guarding the eggs, so they will also display more territorial behavior over a brood.

Breeding occurs readily in captivity. Females will lay around 300 eggs, which will hatch within 96 hours (a few hours after the lights are turned off). The eggs and larvae, due to their significantly small size, are difficult to rear. In addition, brittle stars, serpent stars, wrasses, and crabs will eat damselfish eggs.
