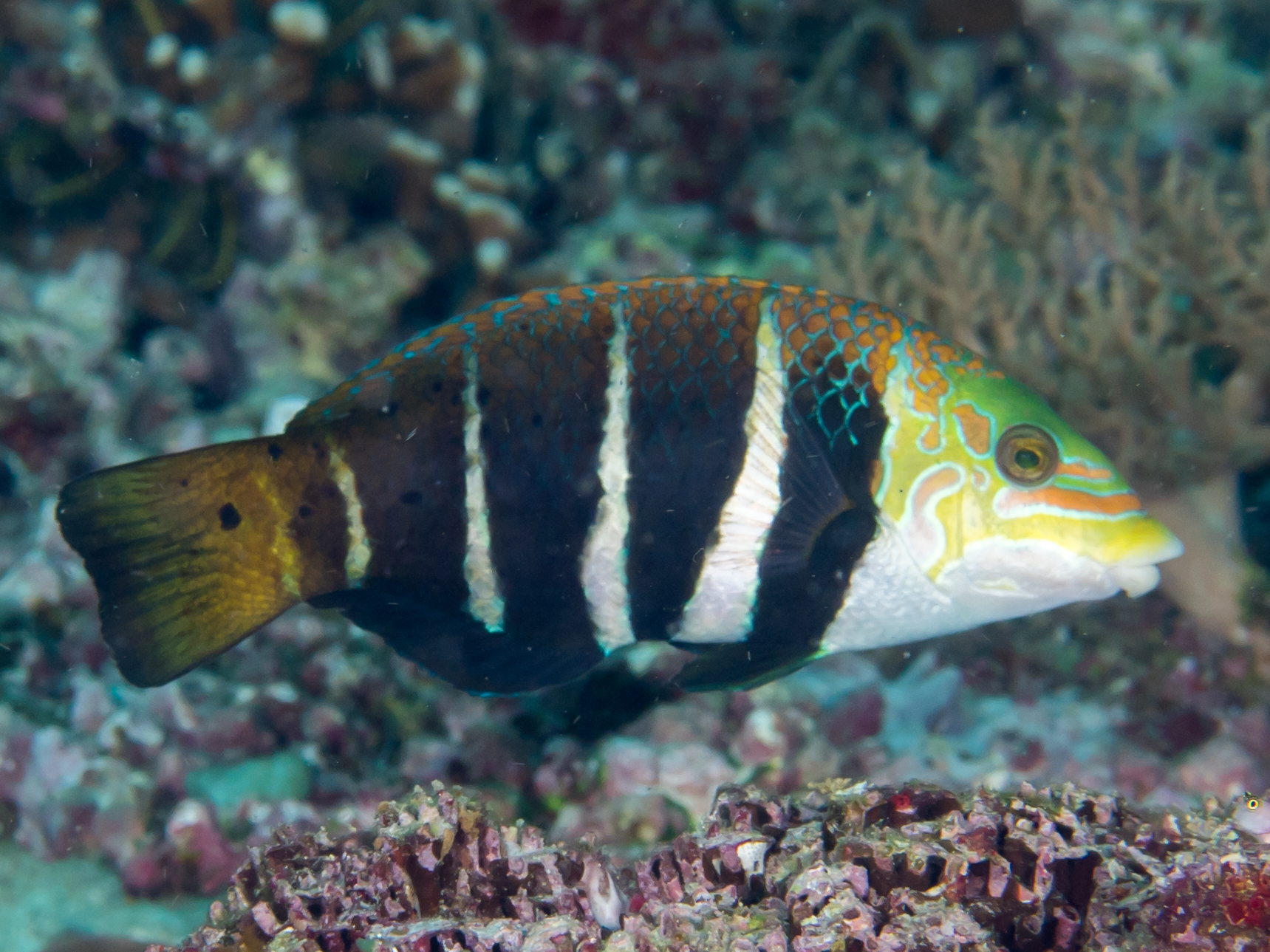
- Hemigymnus fasciatus

Scientific classification
- Kingdom: Animalia
- Phylum: Chordata
- Class: Actinopterygii
- Order: Labriformes
- Family: Labridae
- Subfamily: Julidinae
- Genus: Hemigymnus; Günther, 1861

Type species
- Mullus fasciatus Thunberg, 1795

Synonyms
- Cheilolabrus Alleyne & W. J. Macleay, 1877

= Hemigymnus =

Genus of fishes

Hemigymnus is a genus of wrasses native to the Indian and Pacific oceans.

== Species ==
There are currently 3 recognized species in this genus:

Species	Common name	Image
Hemigymnus fasciatus Bloch, 1792	Barred thicklip	
Hemigymnus melapterus Bloch, 1791	Blackeye thicklip	
Hemigymnus sexfasciatus Rüppell, 1835	Red Sea thicklip	
