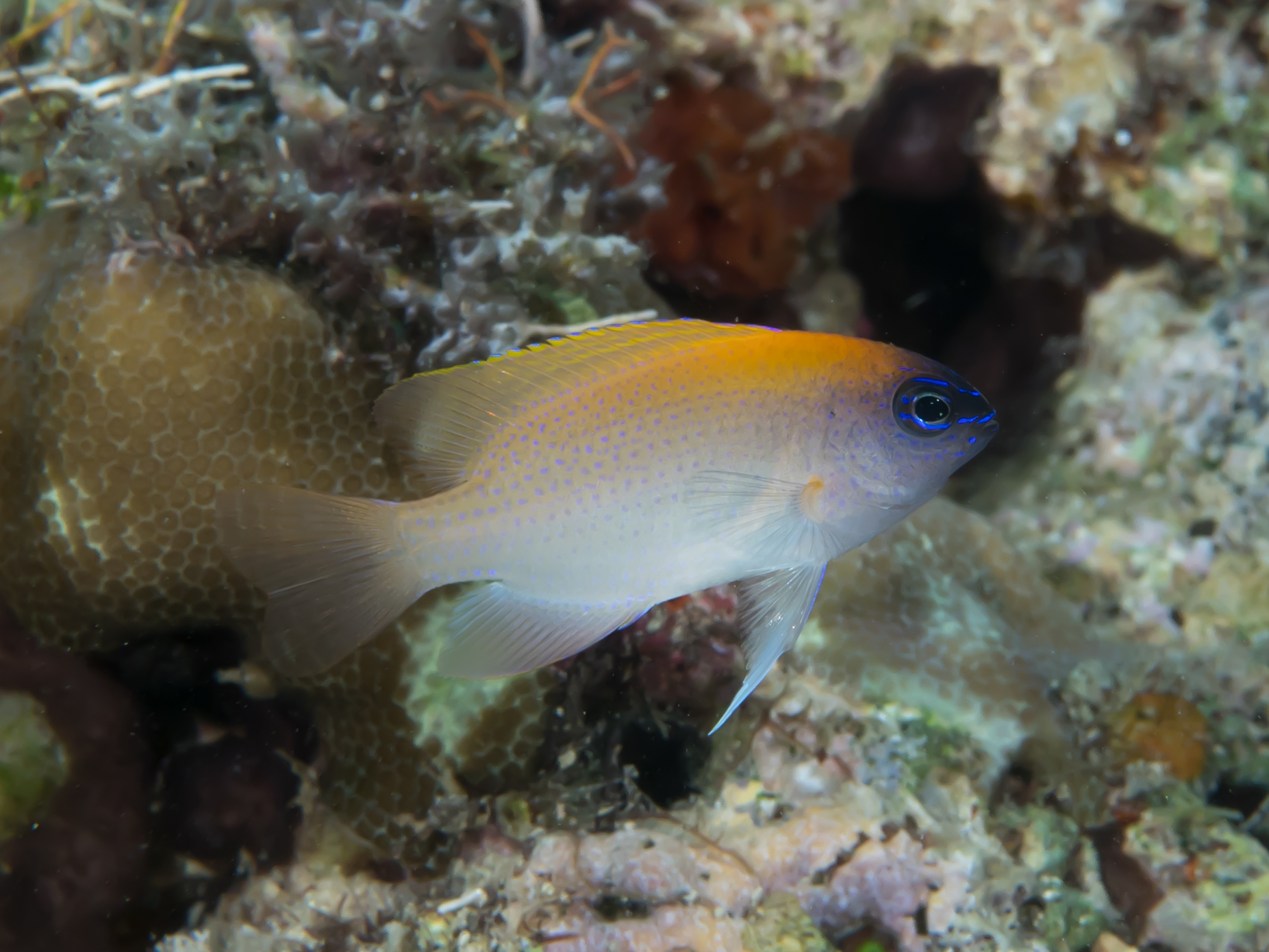

Conservation status
- Least Concern (IUCN 3.1)

Scientific classification
- Kingdom: Animalia
- Phylum: Chordata
- Class: Actinopterygii
- Order: Blenniiformes
- Family: Pomacentridae
- Genus: Chrysiptera
- Species: C. rex

Binomial name
- Chrysiptera rex (Snyder, 1909)

Synonyms
- Abudefduf rex Snyder, 1909; Glyphidodontops rex (Snyder, 1909)

= Chrysiptera rex =

Species of fish

Chrysiptera rex, commonly known as the king demoiselle or pink demoiselle, is a species of damselfish in the family Pomacentridae. It is native to the eastern Indian Ocean and western Pacific, where it lives around reefs. It grows up to 7 centimetres (2.8 in) long. It is of commercial importance in the aquarium trade.

This small reef fish was originally described by Snyder in 1909 as Abudefduf rex from a type specimen collected at Naha, Okinawa Island, Ryukyu Islands, Japan.

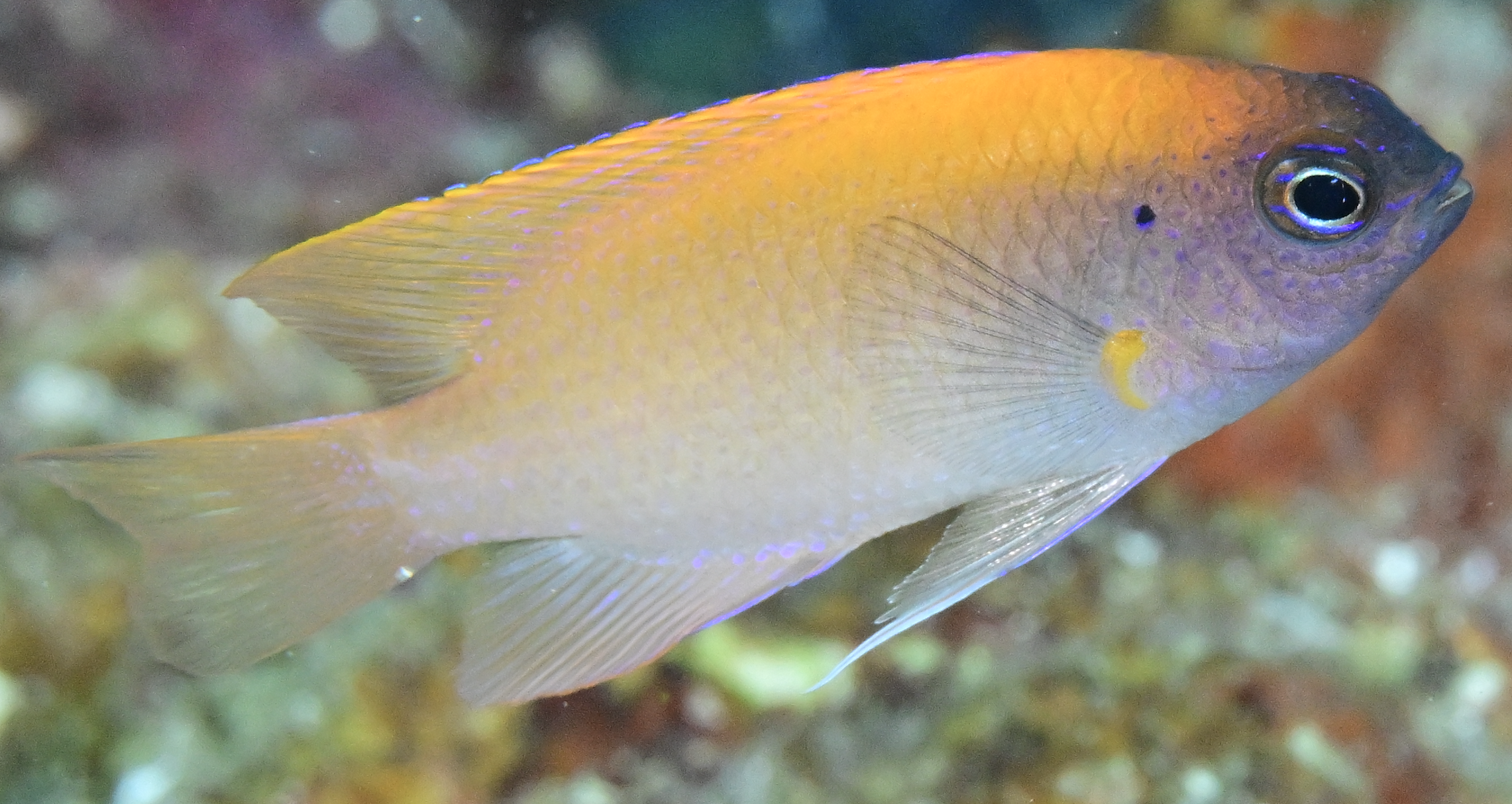
King (Pink) Demoiselle (Chrysiptera rex) - El Nido 2025-10-07

== Synonyms ==
The species has been described under several scientific names:

• Abudefduf rex Snyder, 1909

• Glyphidodontops rex (Snyder, 1909)

• Glyphididontops rex (Snyder, 1909)

== Common Names ==
This species is known by numerous common names, including king demoiselle, pink demoiselle, king damselfish, pink damsel, pink damselfish, peach damsel, rex damsel, rex damselfish, greyhead damselfish, and yellowback damselfish.

The king demoiselle has several noteworthy characteristics beyond its basic taxonomy and distribution that make it particularly interesting both in the wild and in aquarium settings.

== Physical Appearance and Geographic Variation ==
The coloration of this species varies significantly depending on geographic origin. Specimens collected from the Palau area display a whitish body with a bluish head, while individuals from other locations typically have a greyish head with the remaining body and fins appearing yellowish to pinkish-orange. This pink to apricot coloration is often accented with small purple spots and lines on the darker face. The species reaches a maximum size of 6-7 centimeters.

== Habitat and Distribution ==
The king demoiselle inhabits coastal to outer reef crests at depths ranging from 1 to 20 meters (approximately 3 to 70 feet). It shows a preference for lagoons and sheltered reefs, particularly favoring areas with shallow sand and coral patches near reef edges, where it is abundant in northwest Australia. The species has a broad tropical Indo-Pacific distribution, ranging from the eastern Indian Ocean to the Philippines, Palau, Indonesia, New Guinea, New Britain, Solomon Islands, north to southern Japan, and south to New Caledonia and the Great Barrier Reef.

== Diet and Feeding Behavior ==
As an omnivore with algae-grazing tendencies, the king demoiselle feeds primarily on algae along with benthic invertebrates and plankton in its natural environment. This dietary flexibility makes it relatively easy to maintain in captivity, where it readily accepts meaty foods such as mysis shrimp, brine shrimp, squid, fish flesh, clams, and plant-based foods including spirulina flakes and nori.

== Temperament and Behavior ==
Unlike many damselfish species known for aggression, the king demoiselle is notably docile and peaceful. However, it can become territorial in confined spaces and may annoy smaller fishes. This species is sometimes picked on by slightly more aggressive tankmates, so aquariums should provide adequate hiding places. The fish can be kept individually or in groups, with recommendations for a single male and female in smaller aquariums or a male with several females in larger systems of 50+ gallons.

== Reproduction ==
The species is oviparous with distinct pairing during breeding. Eggs are demersal, adhering to the substrate, and males take on the responsibility of guarding and aerating the eggs.

== Aquarium Suitability ==
The king demoiselle is considered suitable for beginners due to its hardiness and adaptability. It is reef-safe and generally compatible with peaceful tankmates. The minimum recommended tank size is 30 gallons, with optimal water parameters including temperatures of 74-84°F (23-28°C), specific gravity of 1.020-1.026, and pH of 8.0-8.5. The species requires moderate lighting and benefits from environments with live rock, caves, and hiding places.

== Conservation and Occurrence ==
While not heavily studied from a conservation perspective, the species is classified as Least Concern by the IUCN. It occurs with moderate frequency, being found at approximately 10.3% of surveyed reef sites within its range, with relatively high abundance averaging 35 individuals per transect where present.
