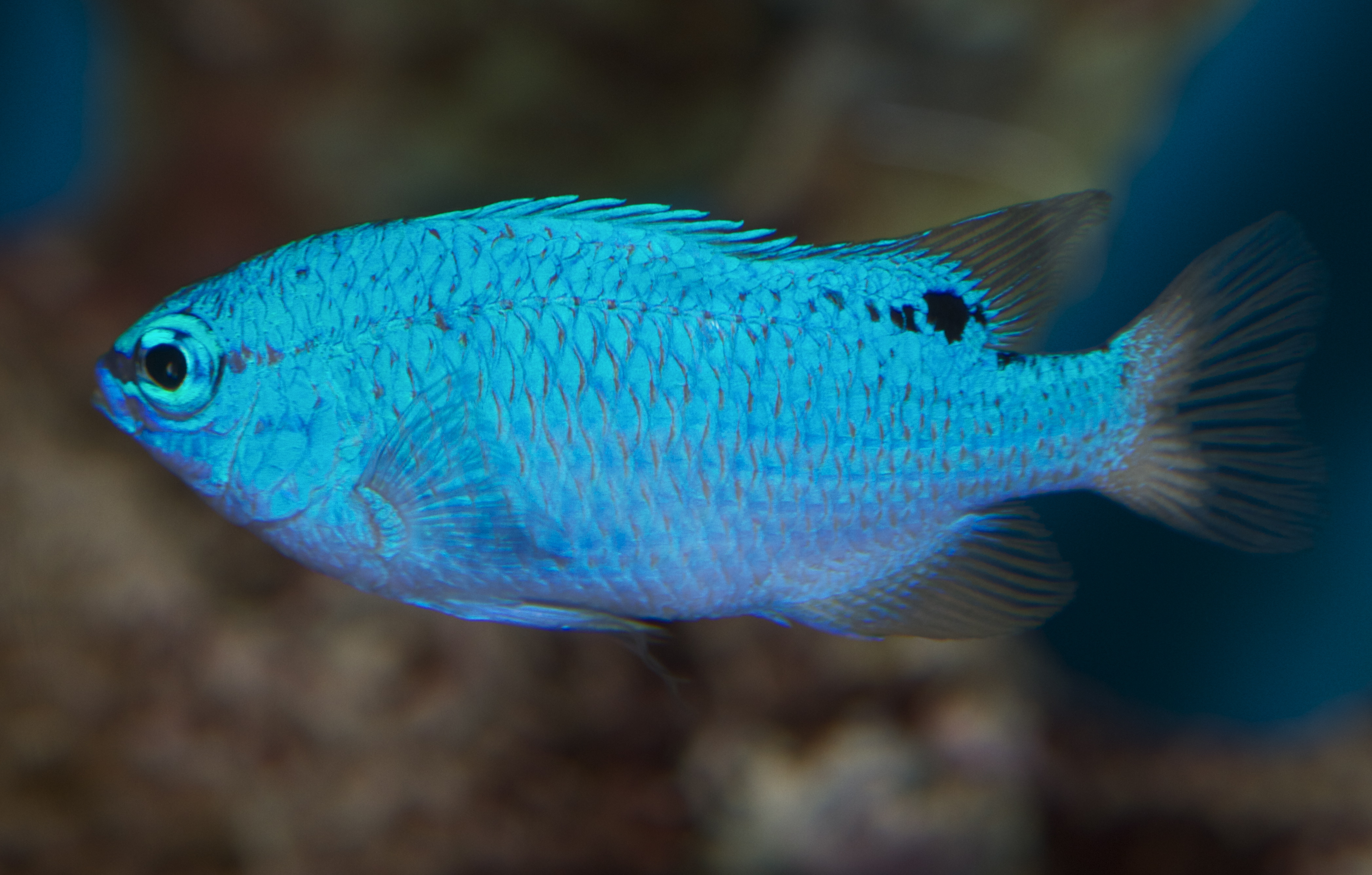

Conservation status
- Least Concern (IUCN 3.1)

Scientific classification
- Kingdom: Animalia
- Phylum: Chordata
- Class: Actinopterygii
- Order: Blenniiformes
- Family: Pomacentridae
- Genus: Chrysiptera
- Species: C. cyanea

Binomial name
- Chrysiptera cyanea Quoy & Gaimard, 1825

Synonyms
- List: Glyphisodon cyaneus Quoy & Gaimard, 1825; Abudefduf cyaneus (Quoy & Gaimard, 1825); Cbrysiptera cyaneus (Quoy & Gaimard, 1825); Glyphidodontops cyaneus (Quoy & Gaimard, 1825); Glyphisodon uniocellatus Quoy & Gaimard, 1825; Abudefduf uniocellatus (Quoy & Gaimard, 1825); Glyphisodon azureus Cuvier, 1830; Chrysiptera gaimardi (Swainson, 1839); Glyphidodon assimilis Günther, 1862; Abudefduf assimilis (Günther, 1862); Abudefduf turchesius D.S. Jordan & Seale, 1907; Abudefduf sapphirus D.S. Jordan & R.E. Richardson, 1908; Glyphisodon hedleyi Whitley, 1927; Chrysiptera punctatoperculare Fowler, 1946

= Chrysiptera cyanea =

Species of fish

Chrysiptera cyanea is a species of damselfish found in the wide Indo-West Pacific but not known in the Red Sea. A few individuals were observed in the Mediterranean Sea in 2013 off Slovenia, a likely aquarium release.

Common names include blue damselfish, blue demoiselle, blue devil, cornflower sergeant-major, Hedley's damselfish, red tail Australian damsel, sapphire devil, and sky-blue damsel.

== Description ==
This fish reaches 8.5 centimeters in length. It is bright blue in color; the male has a yellow snout and tail, and the female and juvenile usually lack yellow but have a black spot at the base of the back edge of the dorsal fin.

== Behavior ==
The fish inhabits reefs and lagoons. Its diet includes algae, tunicates, and copepods. Male and female pair up for breeding, and the male guards and tends the eggs.

== In aquarium ==
It is very aggressive. A matched couple often attacks any same size fish approaching its breeding territory.
