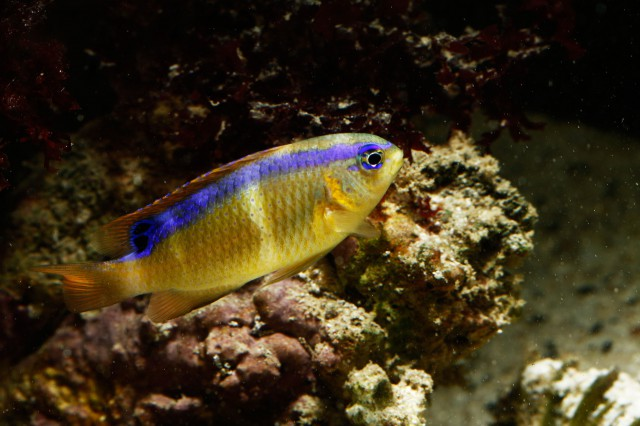

Conservation status
- Least Concern (IUCN 3.1)

Scientific classification
- Kingdom: Animalia
- Phylum: Chordata
- Class: Actinopterygii
- Order: Blenniiformes
- Family: Pomacentridae
- Genus: Chrysiptera
- Species: C. brownriggii

Binomial name
- Chrysiptera brownriggii (Bennett, 1828)

Synonyms
- List: Chaetodon brownriggii Bennett, 1828; Glyphisodon leucopomus Cuvier, 1830; Chrysiptera leucopoma (Cuvier, 1830); Chrysiptera leucopomus (Cuvier, 1830); Glyphidodontops leucopomus (Cuvier, 1830); Glyphisodon xanthozona Bleeker, 1853; Abudefduf xanthozona (Bleeker, 1853); Abudefduf xanthozonus (Bleeker, 1853); Chrysiptera xanthozona (Bleeker, 1853); Glyphisodon albofasciatus Hombron & H. Jacquinot, 1853; Chrysiptera albofasciata Hombron & Jacquinot, 1853; Glyphidodon taenioruptus Cartier, 1874; Glyphidodon amabilis De Vis, 1884; Abudefduf miyakoe Okada & Ikeda, 1937; Chrysiptera caudofasciata Okada & Ikeda, 1939

= Chrysiptera brownriggii =

Species of fish

Chrysiptera brownriggii, commonly known as the surge damselfish, is a species of marine fish. It is widespread in Indo-Pacific waters from East Africa to the Marquesas Islands and Society Islands, north to Japan and south to Australia. Its common name arises because it is associated with the rubble in channels created by tidal surges in reefs, but it is also found on reef flats and submerged terraces. It is territorial but is frequently encountered in groups. The identity of the person honoured by the specific name was not stated by Bennett in his original description but it is almost certainly Robert Brownrigg (1759-1833) who was governor of Ceylon where the type was collected.
