= Chrysiptera galba =

Conservation status
- Least Concern (IUCN 3.1)

Scientific classification
- Kingdom: Animalia
- Phylum: Chordata
- Class: Actinopterygii
- Order: Blenniiformes
- Family: Pomacentridae
- Genus: Chrysiptera
- Species: C. galba

Binomial name
- Chrysiptera galba (Allen & Randall, 1974)

Synonyms
- Glyphidodontops galbus Allen & Randall, 1974

Species of fish

Chrysiptera galba, commonly known as the canary demoiselle, is a species of damselfish. It is native to the western Pacific Ocean. It reaches 7 centimetres (2.8 in) in length. The male guards and tends the eggs.

== In aquarium ==
It is a rare species which needs special care.
