= Chrysiptera caeruleolineata =

Conservation status
- Least Concern (IUCN 3.1)

Scientific classification
- Kingdom: Animalia
- Phylum: Chordata
- Class: Actinopterygii
- Order: Blenniiformes
- Family: Pomacentridae
- Genus: Chrysiptera
- Species: C. caeruleolineata

Binomial name
- Chrysiptera caeruleolineata (Allen, 1973)

Synonyms
- Abudefduf caeruleolineatus Allen, 1973; Glyphidodontops caerulineatus (Allen, 1973)

Species of fish

Chrysiptera caeruleolineata, commonly called the blueline demoiselle, is a species of damselfish from the Indian and western Pacific Oceans. It is up to 6 centimetres (2.4 in) long.
