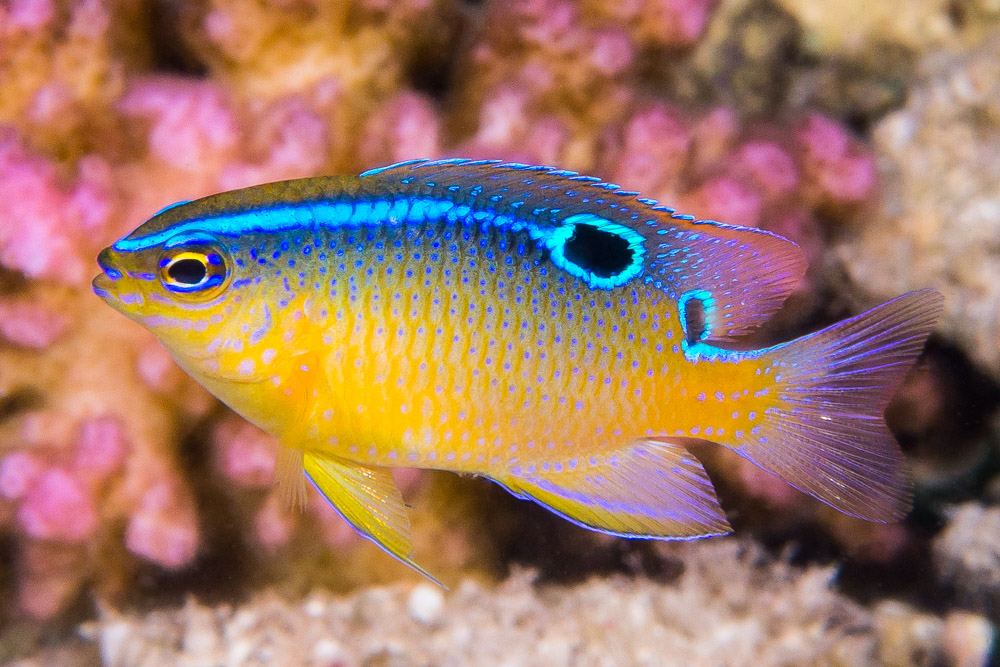

Conservation status
- Least Concern (IUCN 3.1)

Scientific classification
- Kingdom: Animalia
- Phylum: Chordata
- Class: Actinopterygii
- Order: Blenniiformes
- Family: Pomacentridae
- Genus: Chrysiptera
- Species: C. unimaculata

Binomial name
- Chrysiptera unimaculata (Cuvier, 1830)

Synonyms
- Glyphidodon dispar Günther, 1862; Glyphidodon hemimelas Kner, 1868; Glyphidodontops unimaculatus (Cuvier, 1830); Glyphisodon filholi Sauvage, 1879; Glyphisodon unimaculatus Cuvier, 1830

= Chrysiptera unimaculata =

Species of fish

Chrysiptera unimaculata, commonly known as the one-spot damselfish, among variations of this name, is a species of damselfish in the family Pomacentridae. It is native to the Pacific and Indian Oceans. The species is Least concern according to the IUCN. The adults of the species are usually found in small groups or are solitary.
