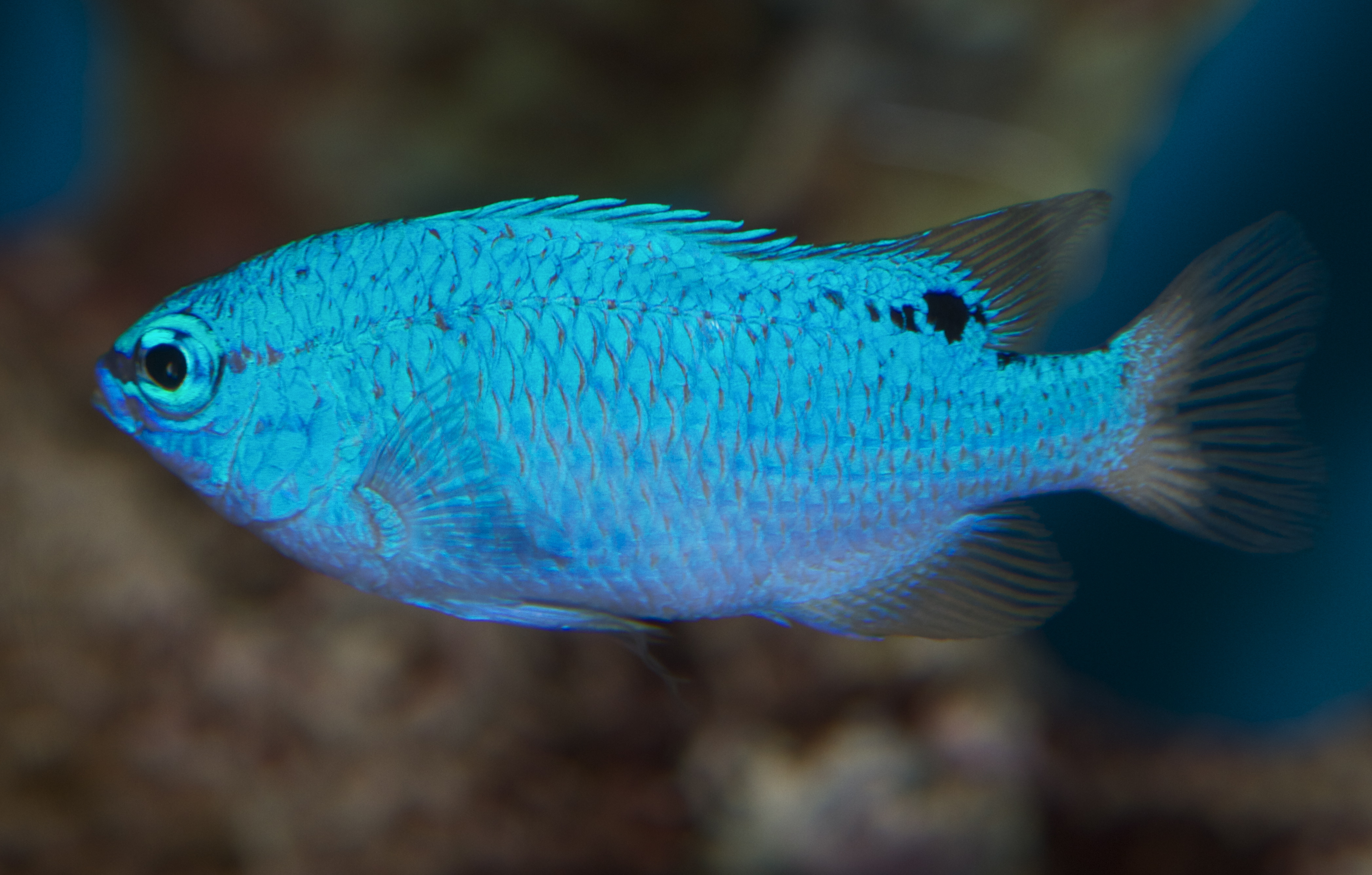
- Chrysiptera cyanea

Scientific classification
- Kingdom: Animalia
- Phylum: Chordata
- Class: Actinopterygii
- Order: Blenniiformes
- Family: Pomacentridae
- Subfamily: Pomacentrinae
- Genus: Chrysiptera; Swainson, 1839

Type species
- Glyphisodon azureus Cuvier, 1830

= Chrysiptera =

Genus of fishes

Chrysiptera is a genus of damselfish in the family Pomacentridae.

== Species ==
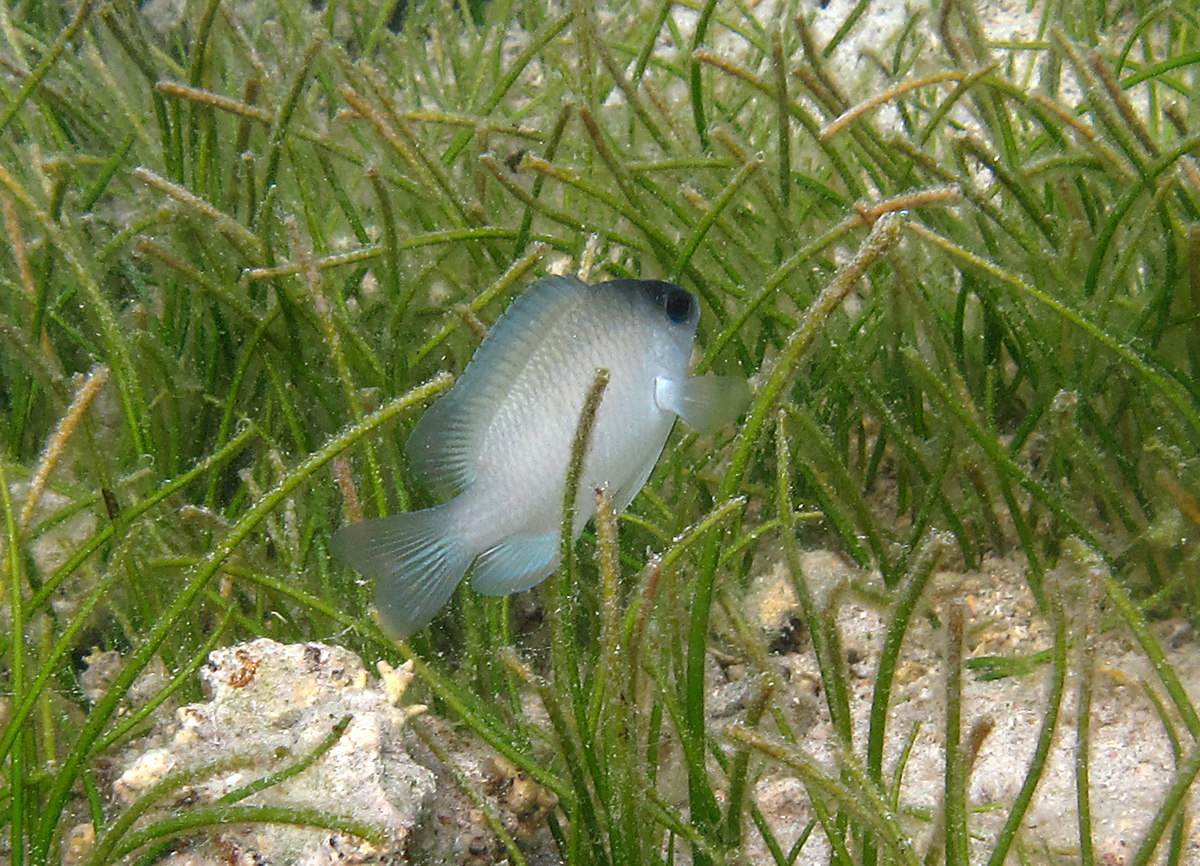
Chrysiptera glauca

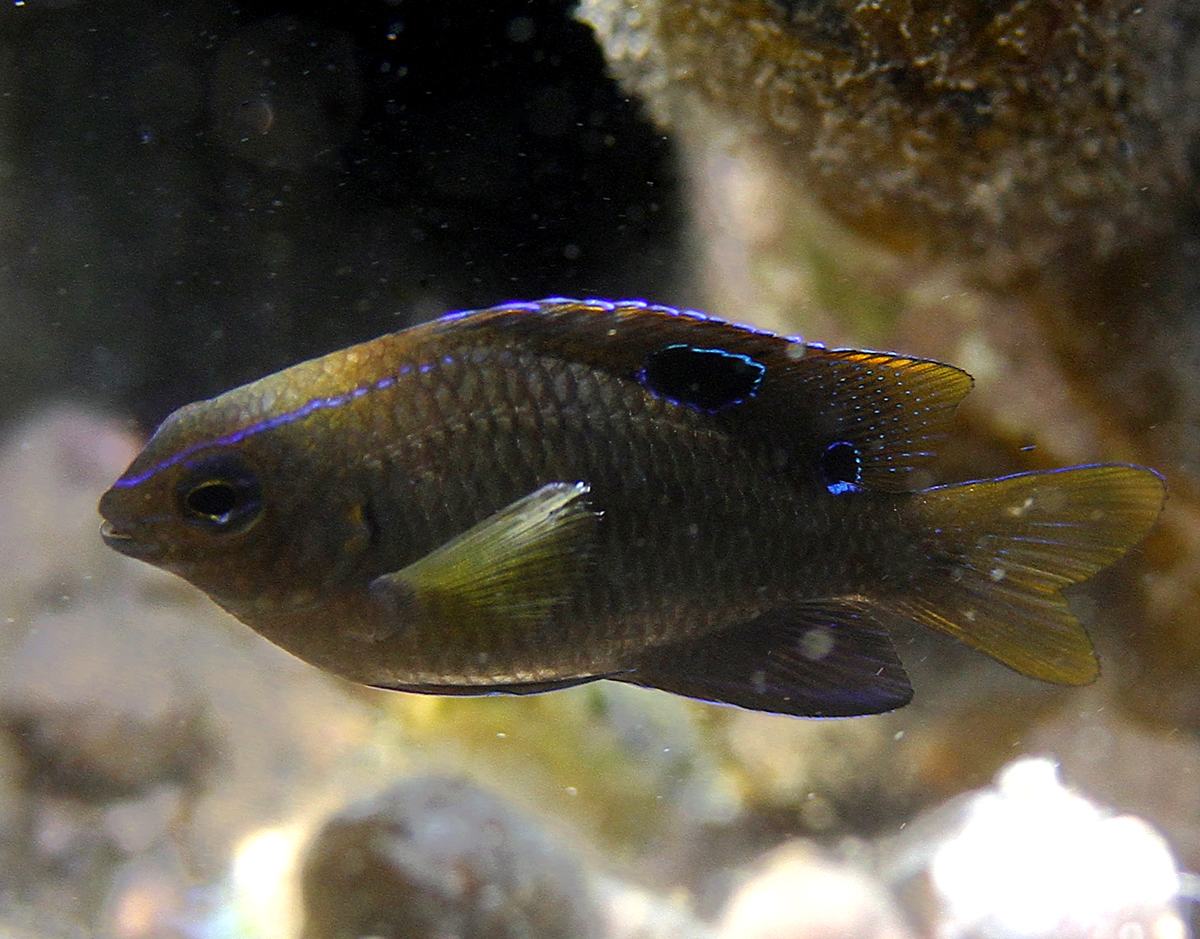
Chrysiptera unimaculata

There are currently 35 recognized species in this genus:

- Chrysiptera albata G. R. Allen & S. Bailey, 2002
- Chrysiptera arnazae G. R. Allen, Erdmann & P. H. Barber, 2010 (Arnaz's damselfish)
- Chrysiptera biocellata (Quoy & Gaimard, 1825) (Twin-spot damselfish)
- Chrysiptera bleekeri (Fowler & Bean, 1928) (Bleeker's damselfish)
- Chrysiptera brownriggii (E. T. Bennett, 1828) (Surge damselfish)
- Chrysiptera burtjonesi Allen, Erdmann & Cahyani, 2017 (Burt's damselfish)
- Chrysiptera caeruleolineata (G. R. Allen, 1973) (Blue-line damselfish)
- Chrysiptera caesifrons G. R. Allen, Erdmann & Kurniasih, 2015 (Grey-back damselfish)
- Chrysiptera chrysocephala Manica, N. J. Pilcher & S. G. Oakley, 2002
- Chrysiptera cyanea (Quoy & Gaimard, 1825) (Sapphire damselfish)
- Chrysiptera cymatilis G. R. Allen, 1999 (Malenesian damselfish)
- Chrysiptera ellenae G. R. Allen, Erdmann & Cahyani, 2015 (Ellen's damselfish)
- Chrysiptera flavipinnis (G. R. Allen & D. R. Robertson, 1974) (Yellow-fin damselfish)
- Chrysiptera galba (G. R. Allen & J. E. Randall, 1974) (Canary damselfish)
- Chrysiptera giti G. R. Allen & Erdmann, 2008 (Giti damselfish)
- Chrysiptera glauca (G. Cuvier, 1830) (Grey damselfish)
- Chrysiptera hemicyanea (M. C. W. Weber, 1913) (Azure damselfish)
- Chrysiptera maurineae G. R. Allen, Erdmann & Cahyani, 2015 (Maurine's damselfish)
- Chrysiptera niger (G. R. Allen, 1975) (Black damselfish)
- Chrysiptera notialis (G. R. Allen, 1975) (Southern damselfish)
- Chrysiptera oxycephala (Bleeker, 1877) (Blue-spot damselfish)
- Chrysiptera papuensis G. R. Allen, Erdmann & Cahyani, 2015 (Papuan damselfish)
- Chrysiptera parasema (Fowler, 1918) (Gold-tail damselfish)
- Chrysiptera pricei G. R. Allen & Adrim, 1992 (Price's damselfish)
- Chrysiptera rapanui (D. W. Greenfield & Hensley, 1970) (Easter damselfish)
- Chrysiptera rex (Snyder, 1909) (King damselfish)
- Chrysiptera rollandi (Whitley, 1961) (Rolland's damselfish)
- Chrysiptera sheila J. E. Randall, 1994 (Sheila's damselfish)
- Chrysiptera sinclairi G. R. Allen, 1987 (Sinclair's damselfish)
- Chrysiptera springeri (G. R. Allen & Lubbock, 1976) (Springer's damselfish)
- Chrysiptera starcki (G. R. Allen, 1973) (Starck's damselfish)
- Chrysiptera talboti (G. R. Allen, 1975) (Talbot's damselfish)
- Chrysiptera taupou (D. S. Jordan & Seale, 1906) (South-seas damselfish)
- Chrysiptera traceyi (L. P. Woods & L. P. Schultz, 1960) (Tracey's damselfish)
- Chrysiptera unimaculata (G. Cuvier, 1830) (One-spot damselfish)
