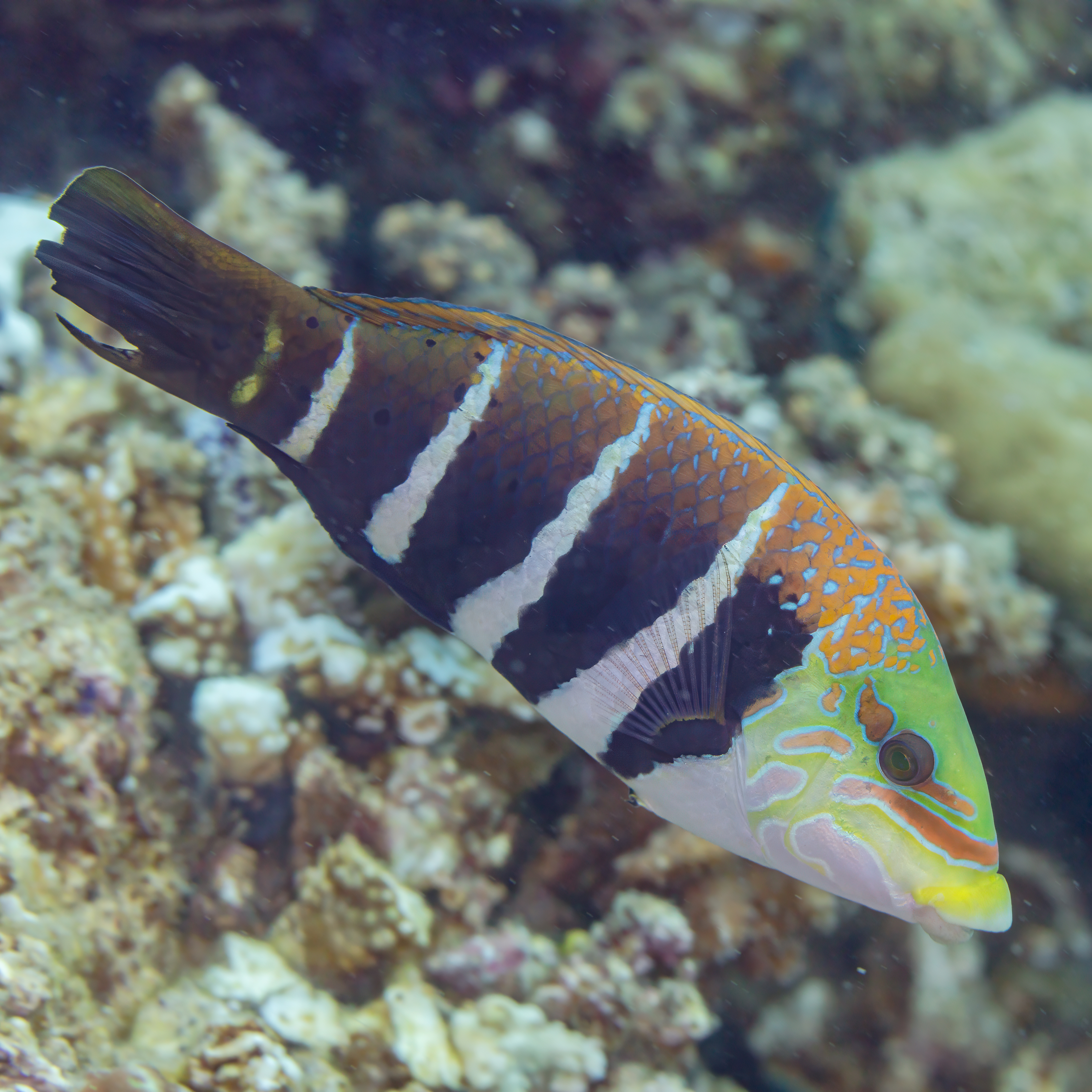

Conservation status
- Least Concern (IUCN 3.1)

Scientific classification
- Kingdom: Animalia
- Phylum: Chordata
- Class: Actinopterygii
- Order: Labriformes
- Family: Labridae
- Genus: Hemigymnus
- Species: H. fasciatus

Binomial name
- Hemigymnus fasciatus (Bloch, 1792)

Synonyms
- List: Labrus fasciatus Bloch, 1792; Halichoeres fasciatus (Bloch, 1792); Labrus fuliginosus Lacépède, 1801; Hemigymnus fuliginosus (Lacépède, 1801); Labrus malapteronotus Lacépède, 1801; Sparus meaco Lacépède, 1802; Sparus zonephorus Lacépède, 1802; Scarus quinquefasciatus J. W. Bennett, 1830; Tautoga mertensii Valenciennes, 1839; Tautoga leucomos Bleeker,1858

= Barred thicklip =

Species of fish

The barred thicklip wrasse (Hemigymnus fasciatus) is a species of fish belonging to the wrasse family, native from the Indo-Pacific.

== Description ==
The barred thicklip wrasse is a medium-sized fish that can reach a maximum length between 30 cm to 50 cm.

Its body is high, relatively flattened, its head is large and its terminal mouth has thick lips. Its body coloration varies according to age.

During the juvenile phase, this wrasse has a green-yellow background color with six yellow vertical lines and in between them there is thin black vertical lines which are not necessarily visible.

The female, in the initial phase, has dark green to black body with four vertical white stripes, the head is green and white with pink pattern which are highlighted in turquoise. The caudal fin is orange.

In terminal phase, the mature male has a dark-green to black body coloration with four white stripes, which are getting finer to the top part of the body and which later may even fade in older specimen. The head is identical to the female one but patterns have a more intense coloration with a characteristic horseshoe pattern on the snout. Its caudal fin has same color than the dominant body color.

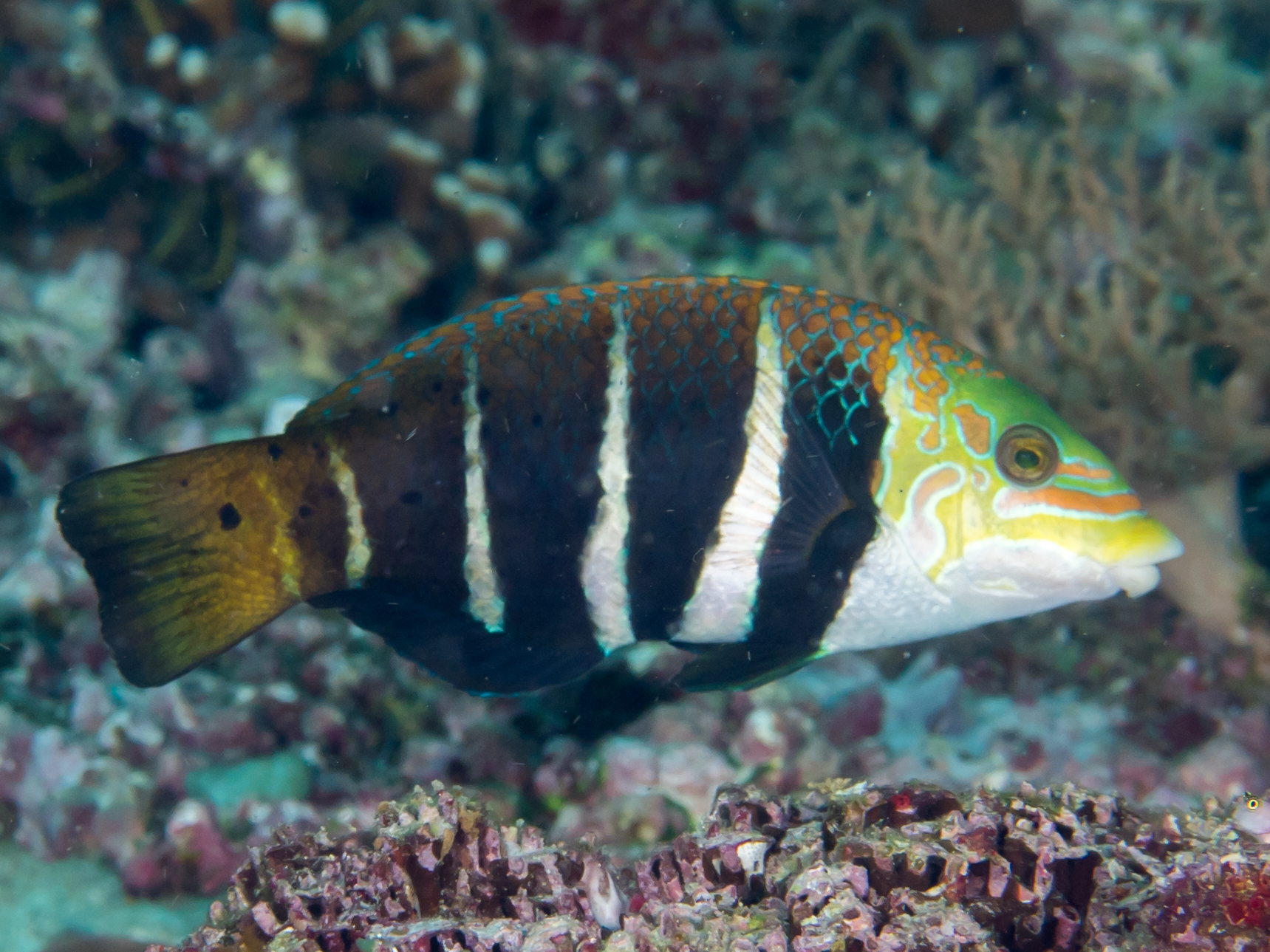
Initial phase

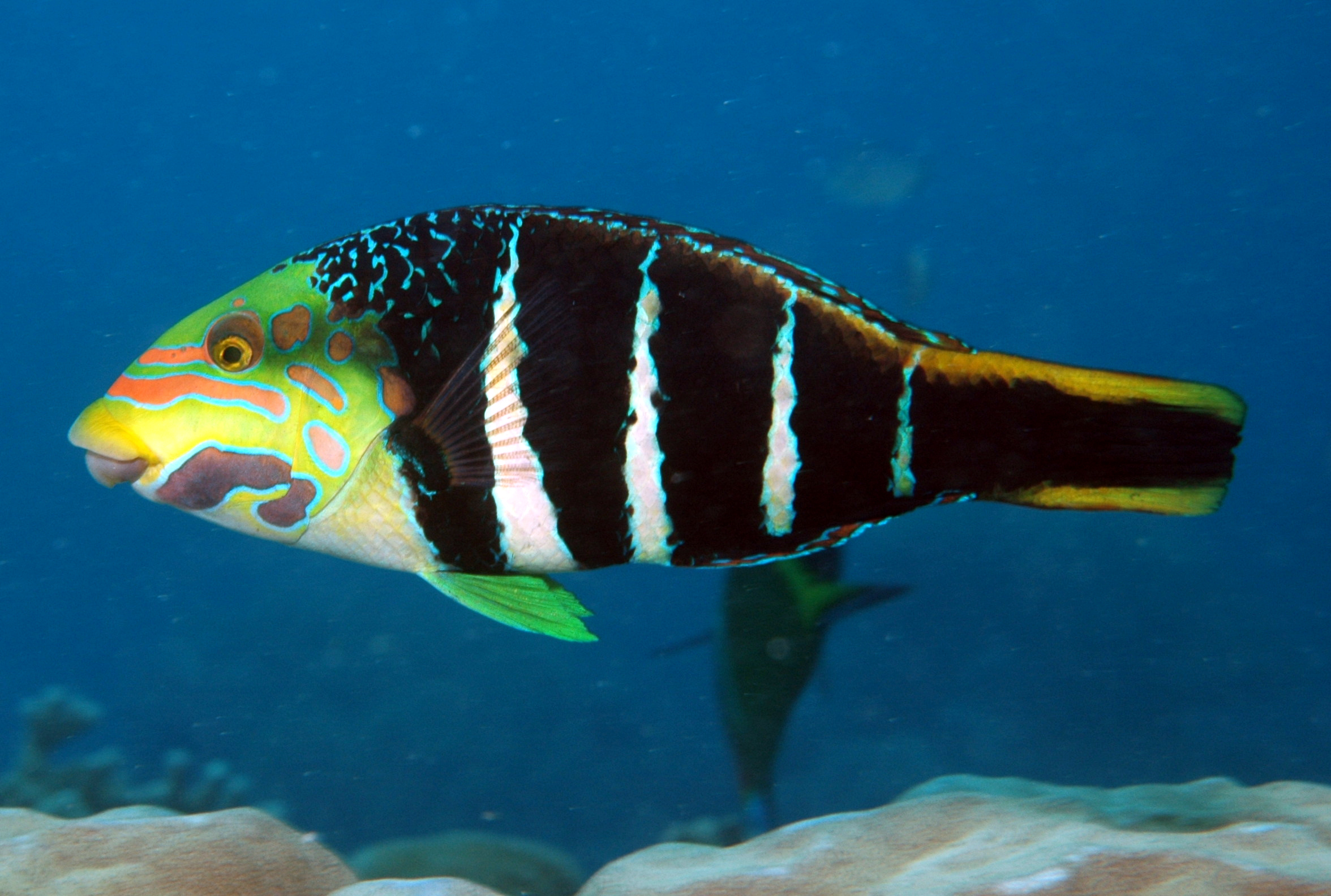
Terminal phase

== Distribution & habitat ==
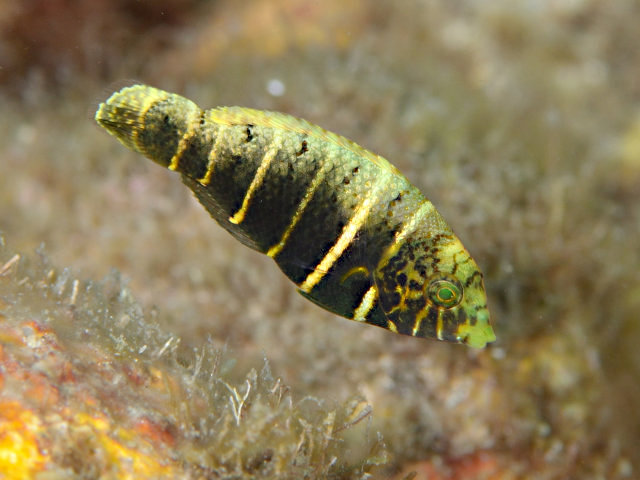
Juvenile

The barred thicklip wrasse is widespread throughout the tropical and subtropical waters of the Indo-Pacific, from the eastern coast of Africa, Red Sea included, until Polynesia and from New Caledonia to south Japan.

The barred thicklip wrasse likes mixed coral areas with rubble, sand and corals where it can easily draw its food and find shelter from the surface to 25 meters deep. Juveniles are more secretive and always keep hidden in corals or even in sea urchins.

== Biology ==
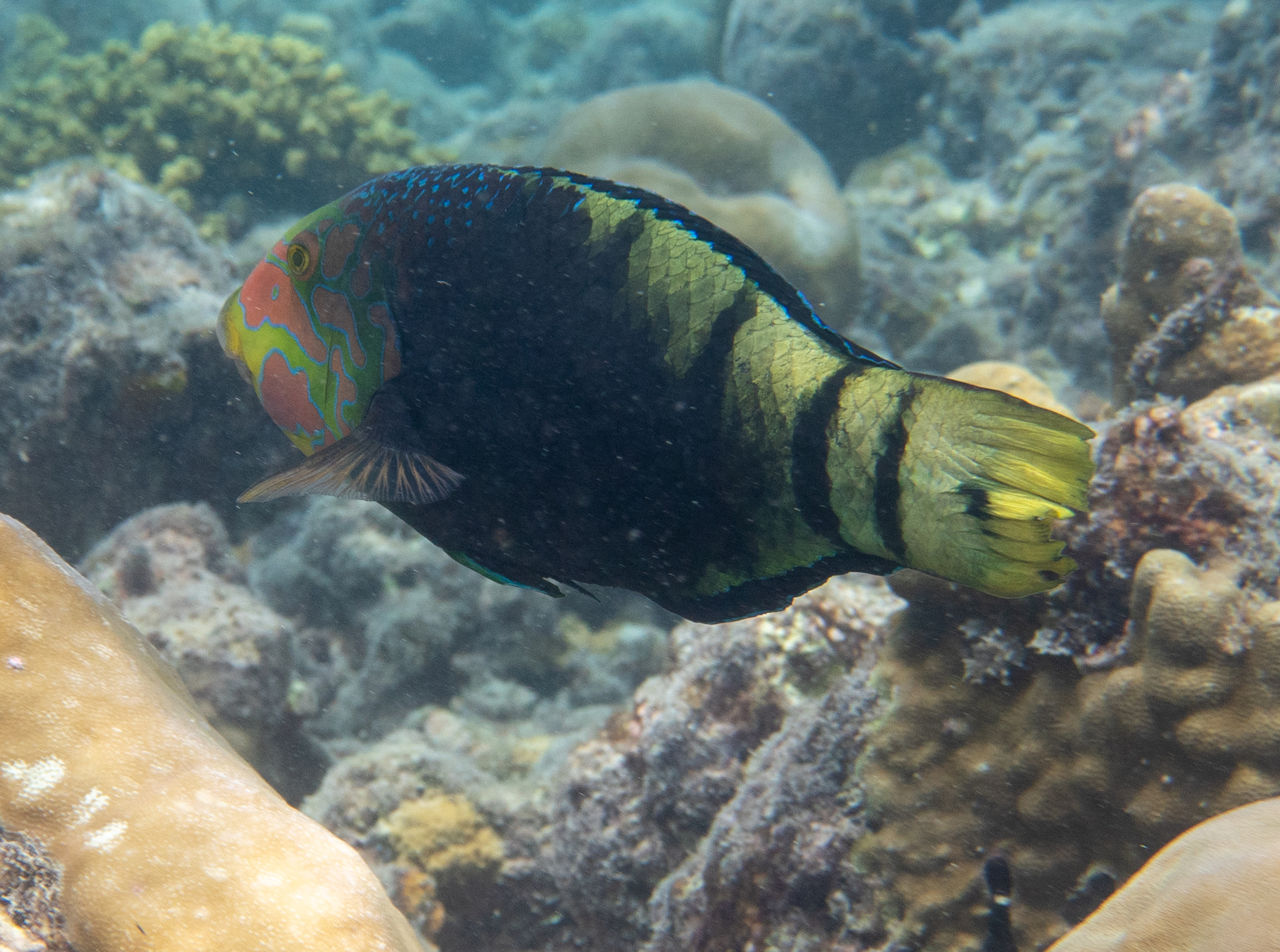
Dark colouration

The barred thicklip wrasse lives solitary but can be observed also in small loose groups. It is a benthic predator that feeds mainly on small marine invertebrates such as crustaceans, molluscs, worms and echinoderms captured on or in the substrate.

Like most wrasse, the chain-lined wrasse is a protogynous hermaphrodite, i.e. individuals start life as females with the capability of turning male later on.

== Conservation status ==
The species is targeted but not thought to be threatened by the aquarium trade. It is listed as Least Concern (LC) by the IUCN.
