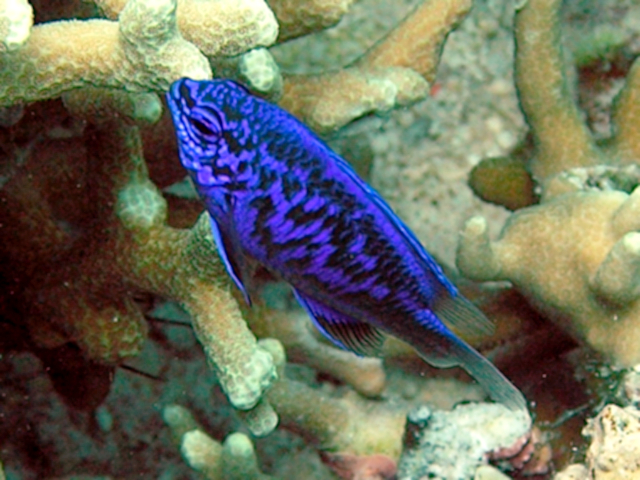

Conservation status
- Least Concern (IUCN 3.1)

Scientific classification
- Kingdom: Animalia
- Phylum: Chordata
- Class: Actinopterygii
- Order: Blenniiformes
- Family: Pomacentridae
- Genus: Chrysiptera
- Species: C. springeri

Binomial name
- Chrysiptera springeri (G. R. Allen & Lubbock, 1976)

Synonyms
- Glyphidodontops springeri Allen & Lubbock, 1976

= Chrysiptera springeri =

Species of fish

Chrysiptera springeri, commonly known as Springer's demoiselle, is a species of damselfish in the family Pomacentridae.

== Taxonomy ==
The specific name honours the ichthyologist Victor G. Springer who collected the type in the Moluccas.

== Description ==
It reaches 5.5 centimetres (2.2 in) in length, and is variable in color.

== Distribution and habitat ==
It is native to the western Pacific Ocean, where it occurs in the tropical waters of Indonesia and the Philippines.
