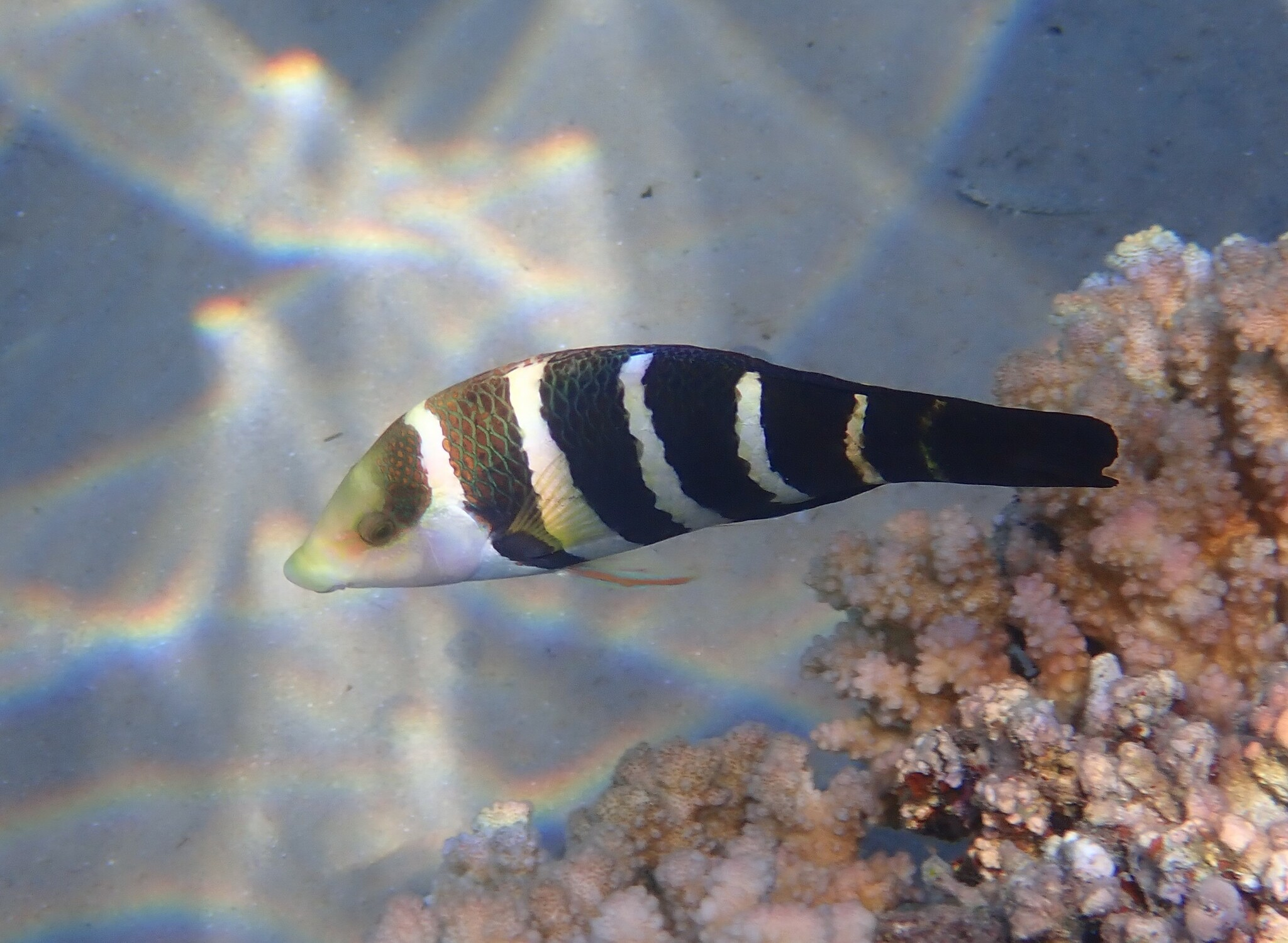

Conservation status
- Data Deficient (IUCN 3.1)

Scientific classification
- Kingdom: Animalia
- Phylum: Chordata
- Class: Actinopterygii
- Order: Labriformes
- Family: Labridae
- Genus: Hemigymnus
- Species: H. sexfasciatus

Binomial name
- Hemigymnus sexfasciatus (Rüppell, 1835)

Synonyms
- Halichoeres sexfasciatus Rüppell, 1835; Halichöeres sexfasciatus Rüppell, 1835

= Hemigymnus sexfasciatus =

Species of fish

Hemigymnus sexfasciatus, the Red Sea thicklip wrasse is a species of marine ray-finned fish from the family Labridae, the wrasses. This fish is endemic to the Red Sea, records from outwith the Red Sea, in the Gulf of Aden and from Socotra require verification. it occurs in areas of sheltered areas in coral reefs and sandy areas with rubble at depths of 1 to 20 metres (3.3 to 65.6 ft).
