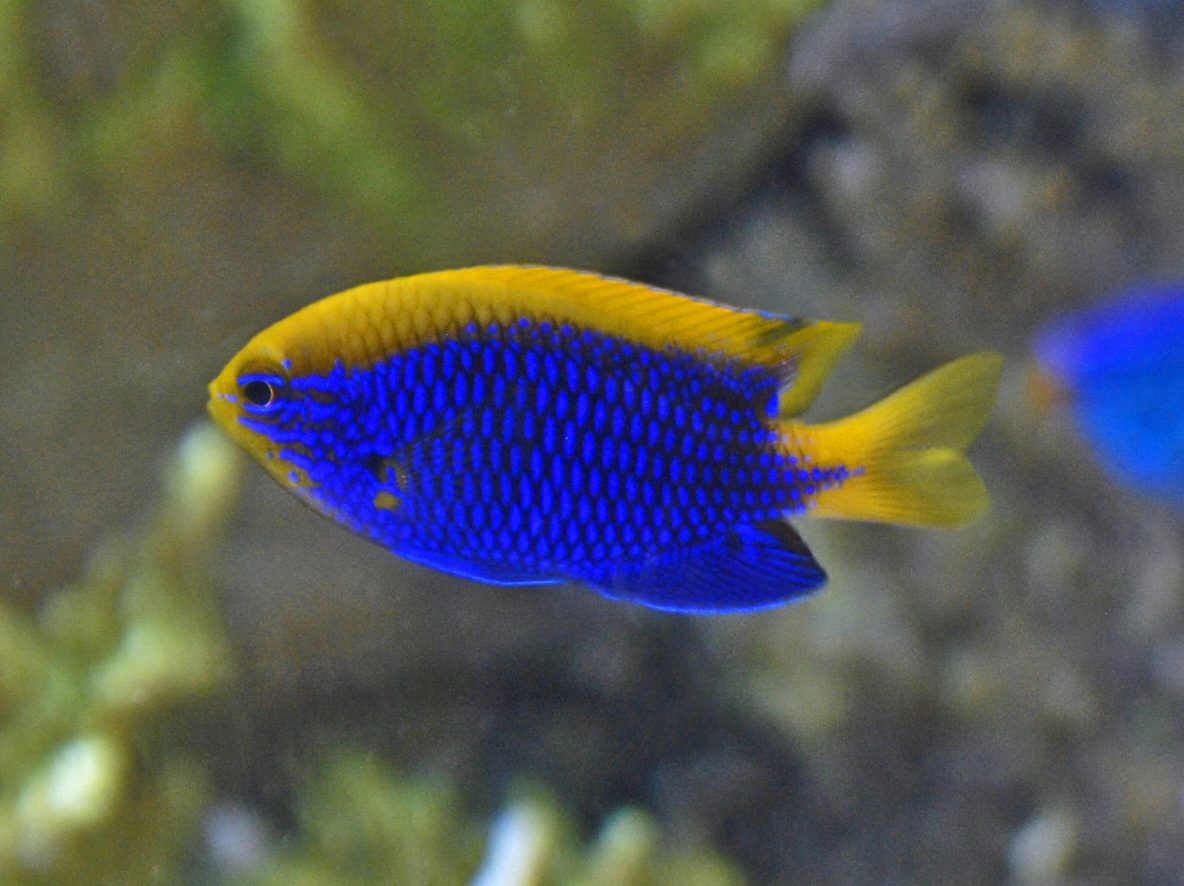

Conservation status
- Least Concern (IUCN 3.1)

Scientific classification
- Kingdom: Animalia
- Phylum: Chordata
- Class: Actinopterygii
- Order: Blenniiformes
- Family: Pomacentridae
- Genus: Chrysiptera
- Species: C. starcki

Binomial name
- Chrysiptera starcki (Allen, 1973)

Synonyms
- Abudefduf starcki Allen, 1973; Glyphidodontops starcki (Allen, 1973)

= Chrysiptera starcki =

Species of fish

Chrysiptera starcki, commonly known as Starck's demoiselle or Starck's damselfish, is a species of damselfish in the family Pomacentridae. It is native to the western Pacific Ocean, where it has been reported from the Ryukyu Islands and Taiwan to Australia, New Caledonia, and Tonga. It was originally described in 1973 as Abudefduf starcki.

== Taxonomy ==
The specific name honours the marine biologist Walter A Starck II who pointed out this species out to Gerald R. Allen while diving with him at Osprey Reef in the Coral Sea.

== Description ==
Starck's demoiselle is blue with a yellow stripe down its back. It grows up to 7 cm (2.8 in) in length.

== Behaviour and ecology ==
The fish lives around reefs, often in deeper, outer areas, up to 60 m (200 ft) deep. It lives in crevices in rocky areas. It pairs up to breed and the male guards and tends the eggs. In the wild, Starck's demoiselle will eat plankton (both zooplankton and phytoplankton).

=== Breeding ===
When breeding, males will swim back and forth swiftly flashing their colors to attract females. Males will prepare a territory full of rubble for the female to lay her eggs. Then the male will fertilize them and aggressively defend them from intruders.

== Aquariums ==
This is a highly desired fish for a saltwater aquarium. Shallow waters are best for the fish. It can be very colorful if fed the correct diet. The minimum aquarium size is 76 L (20 US gal). The tank should be decorated with rocks or gravel and should have many hiding places for the fish. It is not a very aggressive fish, but as it gets bigger it may harass smaller, more passive fish. Two of them together in a tank will fight, however. They are very easy to keep in captivity. They will eat many different types of foods in captivity.
