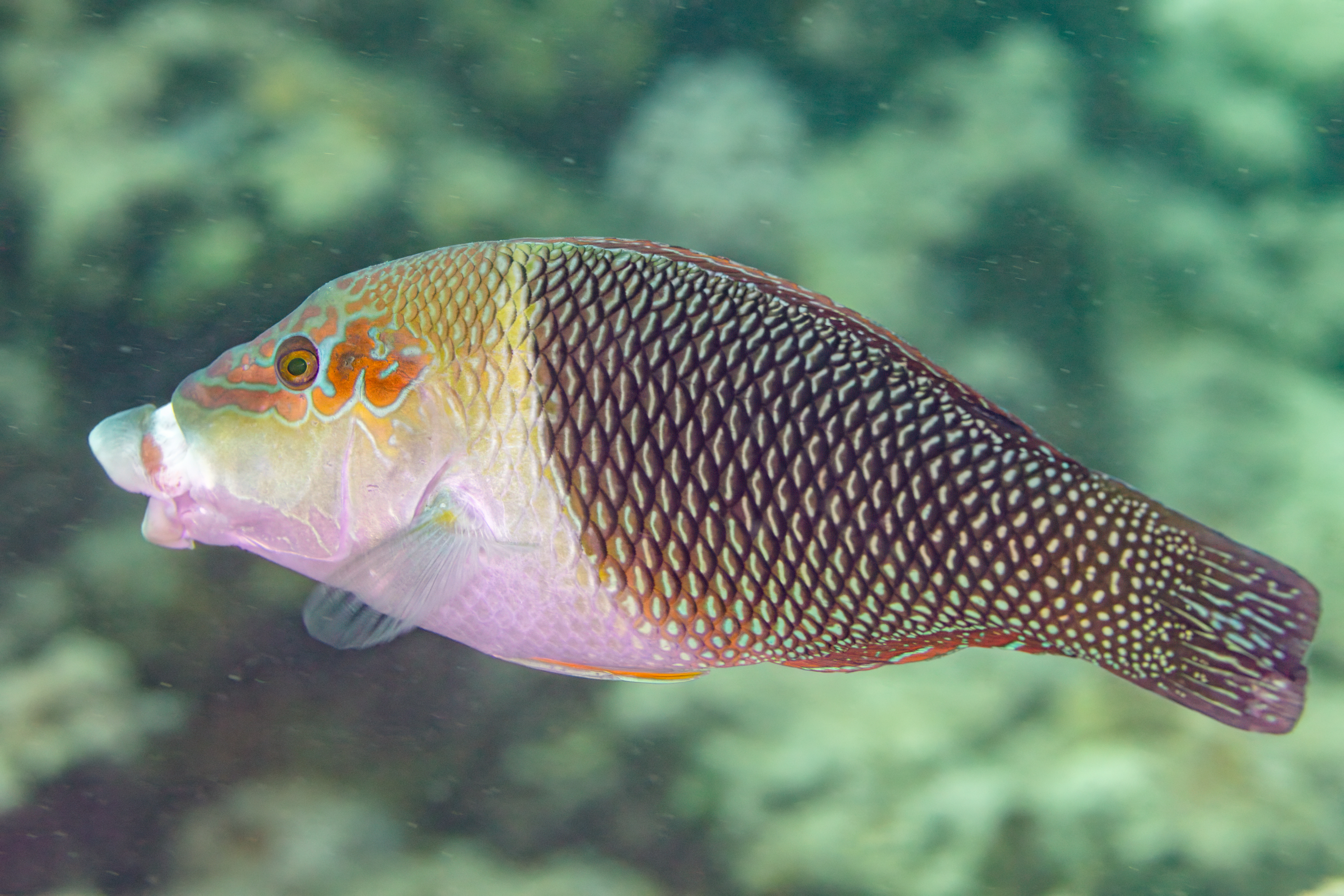

Conservation status
- Least Concern (IUCN 3.1)

Scientific classification
- Kingdom: Animalia
- Phylum: Chordata
- Class: Actinopterygii
- Division: Teleostei
- Order: Labriformes
- Family: Labridae
- Genus: Hemigymnus
- Species: H. melapterus

Binomial name
- Hemigymnus melapterus (Bloch, 1791)

Synonyms
- List: Hemigymnus melanopterus Günther, 1862; Labrus melapterus Bloch, 1791; Halichoeres melapterus (Bloch, 1791); Labrus melampterus Bloch & Schneider, 1801; Sparus niger Lacépède, 1802; Julis boryii Lesson, 1831; Julis beraber Montrouzier, 1857; Labrichthys bicolor Day, 1871; Cheilolabrus magnilabris Alleyne & Macleay, 1877

= Hemigymnus melapterus =

Species of fish

The blackeye thicklip wrasse or half-and-half wrasse (Hemigymnus melapterus) is a species of fish belonging to the wrasse family. It is native to the Indo-Pacific.

== Distribution & habitat ==
The species is widespread throughout the tropical and subtropical waters of the Indo-Pacific, from the eastern coast of Africa including the Red Sea to Polynesia, and from New Caledonia to southern Japan. It prefers areas of coral, coral rubble and sand, outer reef slopes and drop-offs, to depths of at least 40 m. Juveniles are more secretive and always keep hidden in branching corals.

== Description ==
The half-and-half wrasse is a medium-sized fish that can reach a maximum length of 50 cm.

Its body is high, relatively flattened, its head is large and its terminal mouth has thick lips. Its body coloration varies according to age. Juvenile wrasse have a greenish yellow background color with yellow vertical lines, a broad white diagonal band just behind the operculum, an orange caudal fin and a greenish gray front. Mature females are green behind the oblique line, with black-rimmed scales. A complex tangle of pink lines underlined with turquoise crosses from the top of the snout to the head. Mature males (terminal phase - see below) also have an emerald green stripe behind each scale and a blue rim around the eye; the top of the snout and head are green with pink patterns highlighted in turquoise.

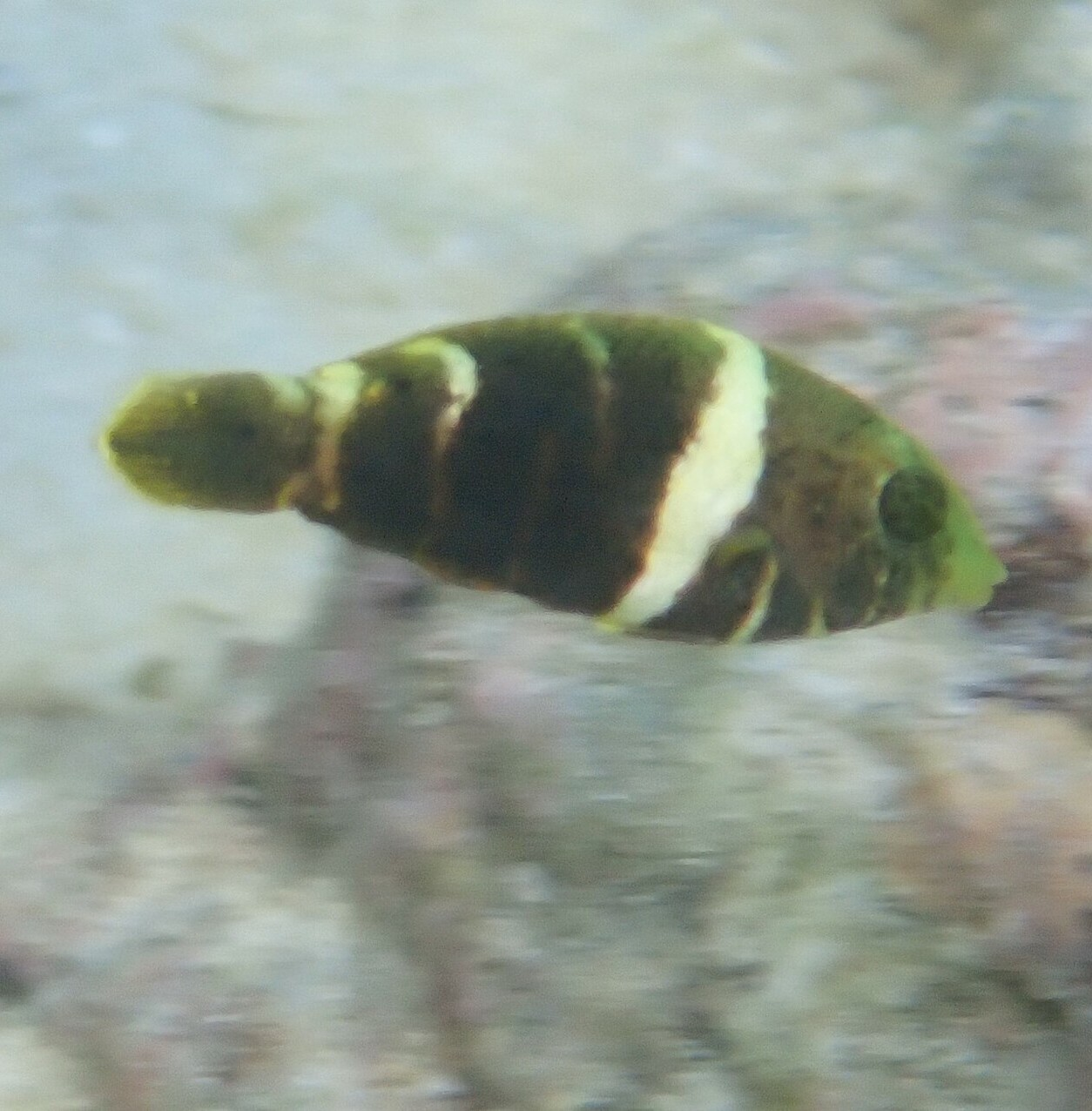
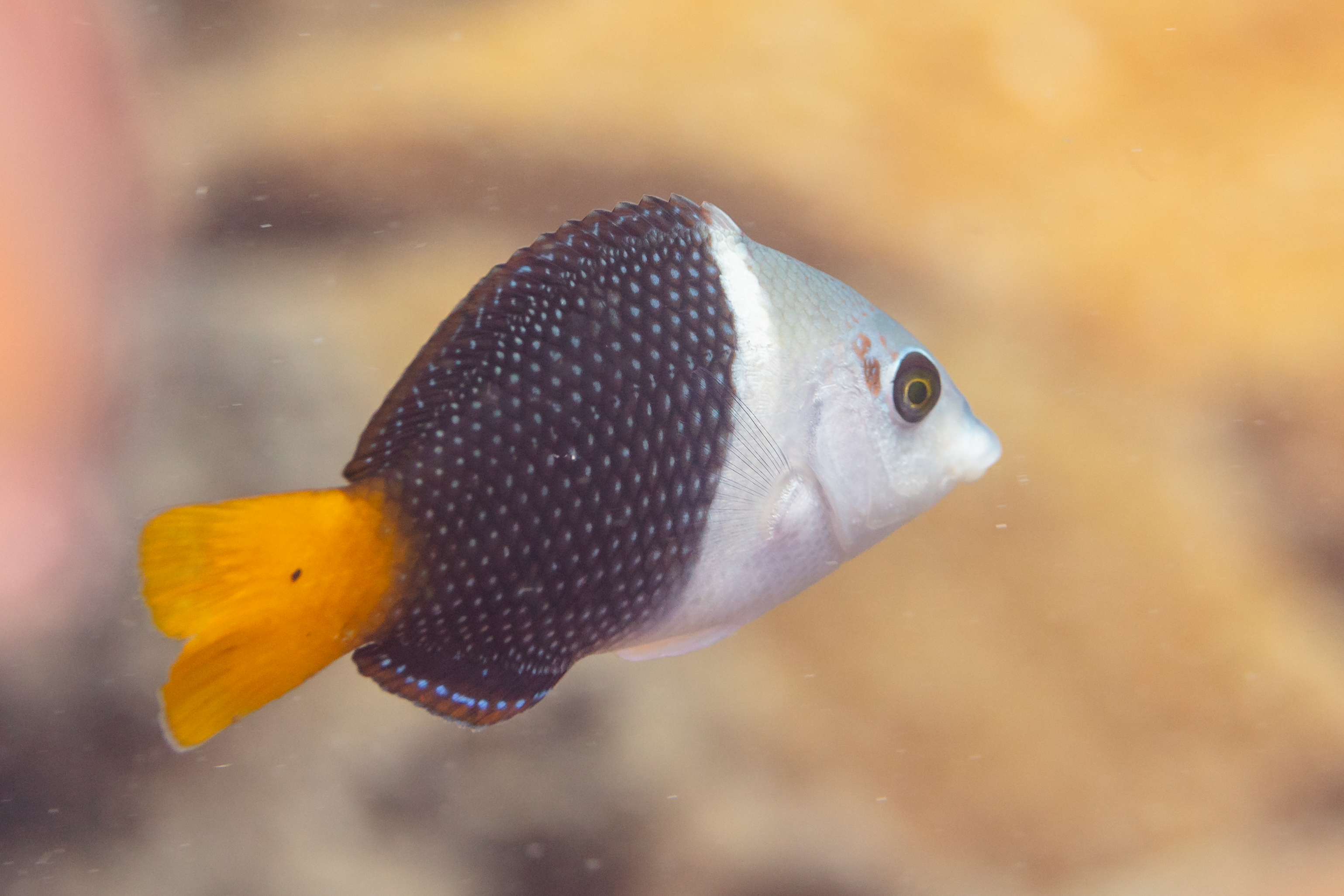
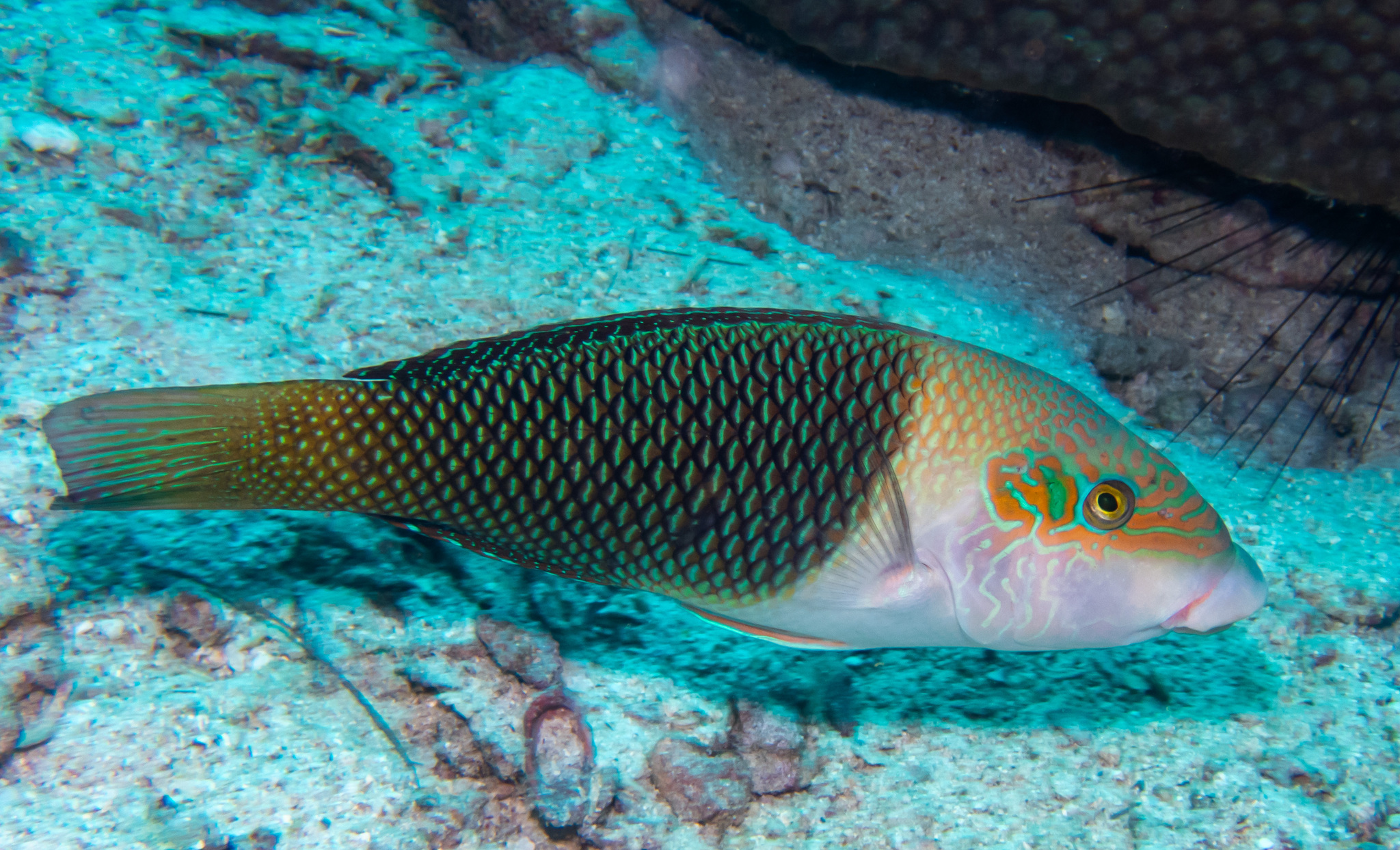
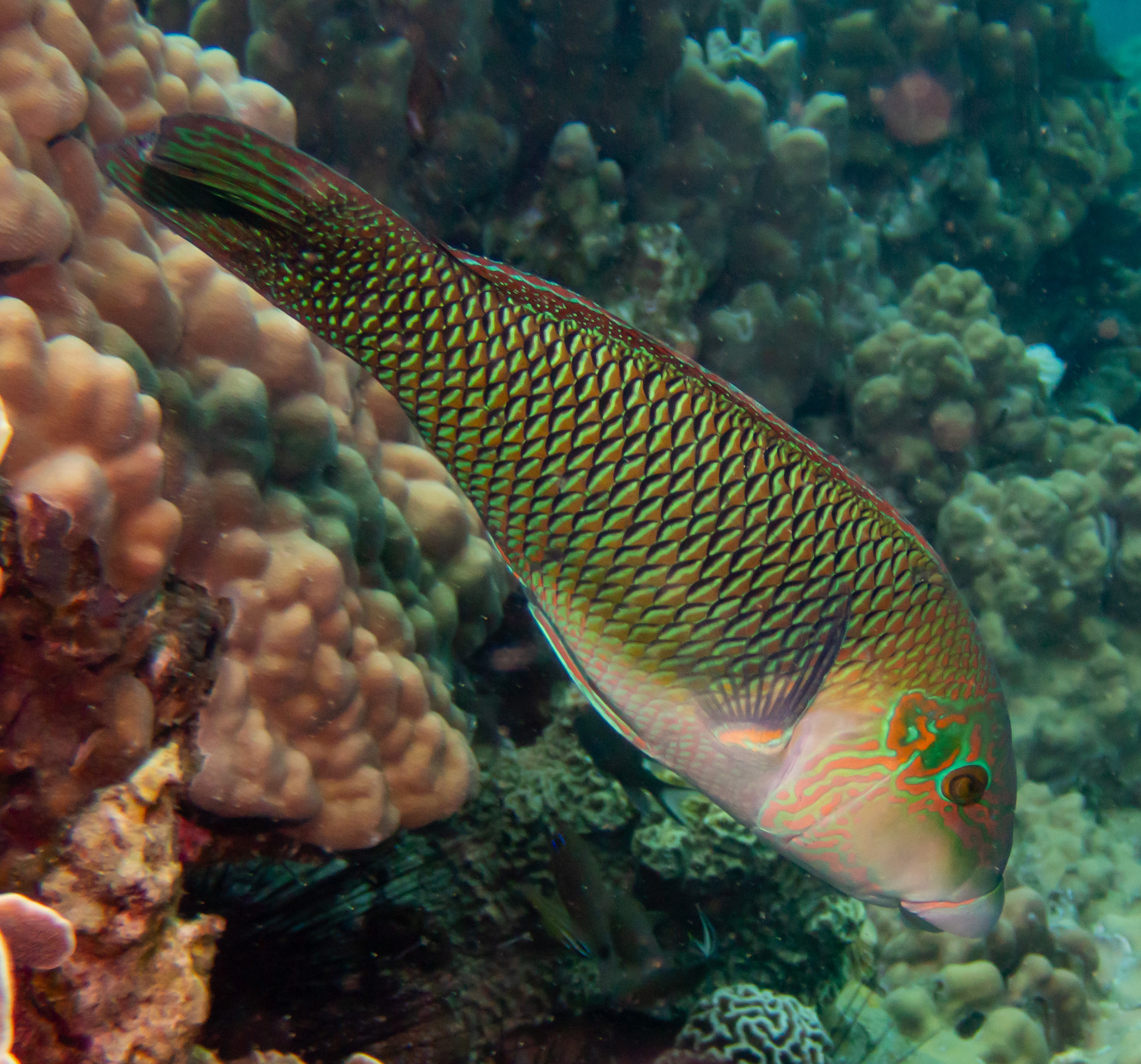
Growth series: from youngest juvenile to oldest adult

== Biology ==
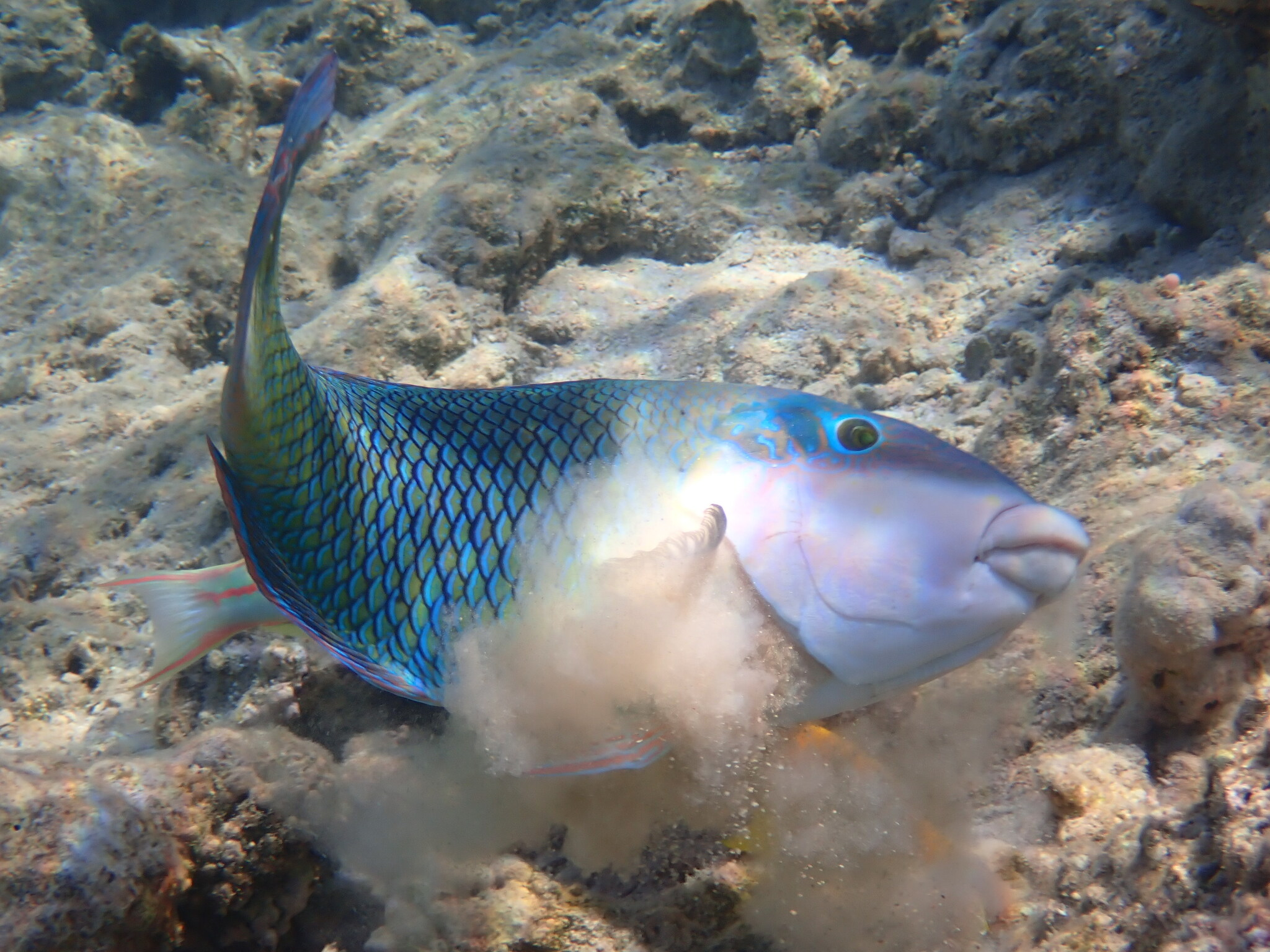
Feeding, expelling sand from gills

The half-and-half wrasse lives solitary or in small groups. It is a benthic predator that feeds mainly on small marine invertebrates such as crustaceans, molluscs, worms and echinoderms captured on or in the substrate.

In addition to picking food off coral branches, it may take in mouthfuls of sand, sorting out food items in the mouth and then expelling the sand through the gill operculae.

Like most wrasse, it is a protogynous hermaphrodite, i.e. individuals start life as females with the capability of turning male later on.

== Conservation status ==
The species is targeted but not thought to be threatened by the aquarium trade, and is being sought as a food fish and by spear fishers. It is present in several large protected areas, and currently listed as Least Concern (LC) by the IUCN.

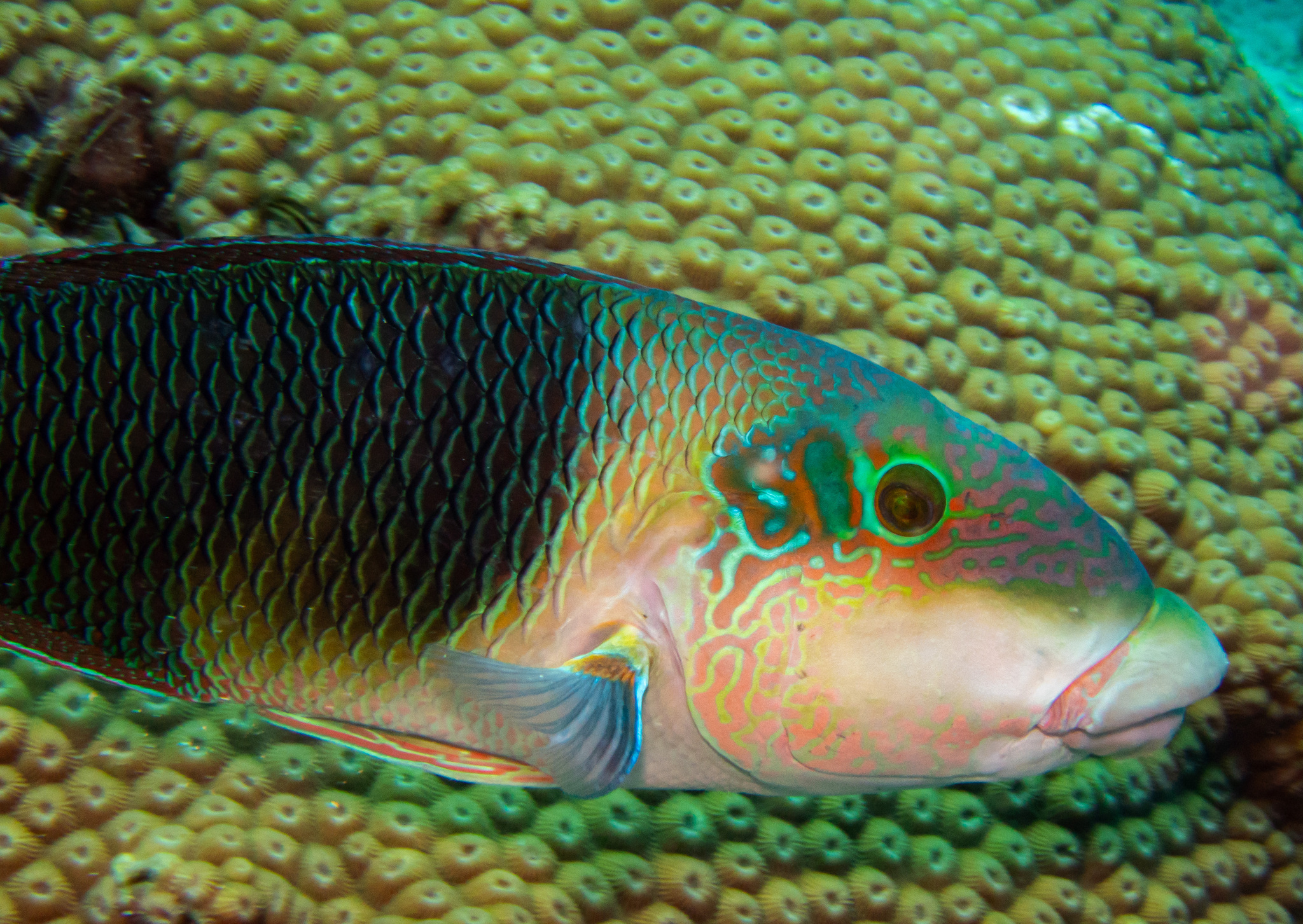

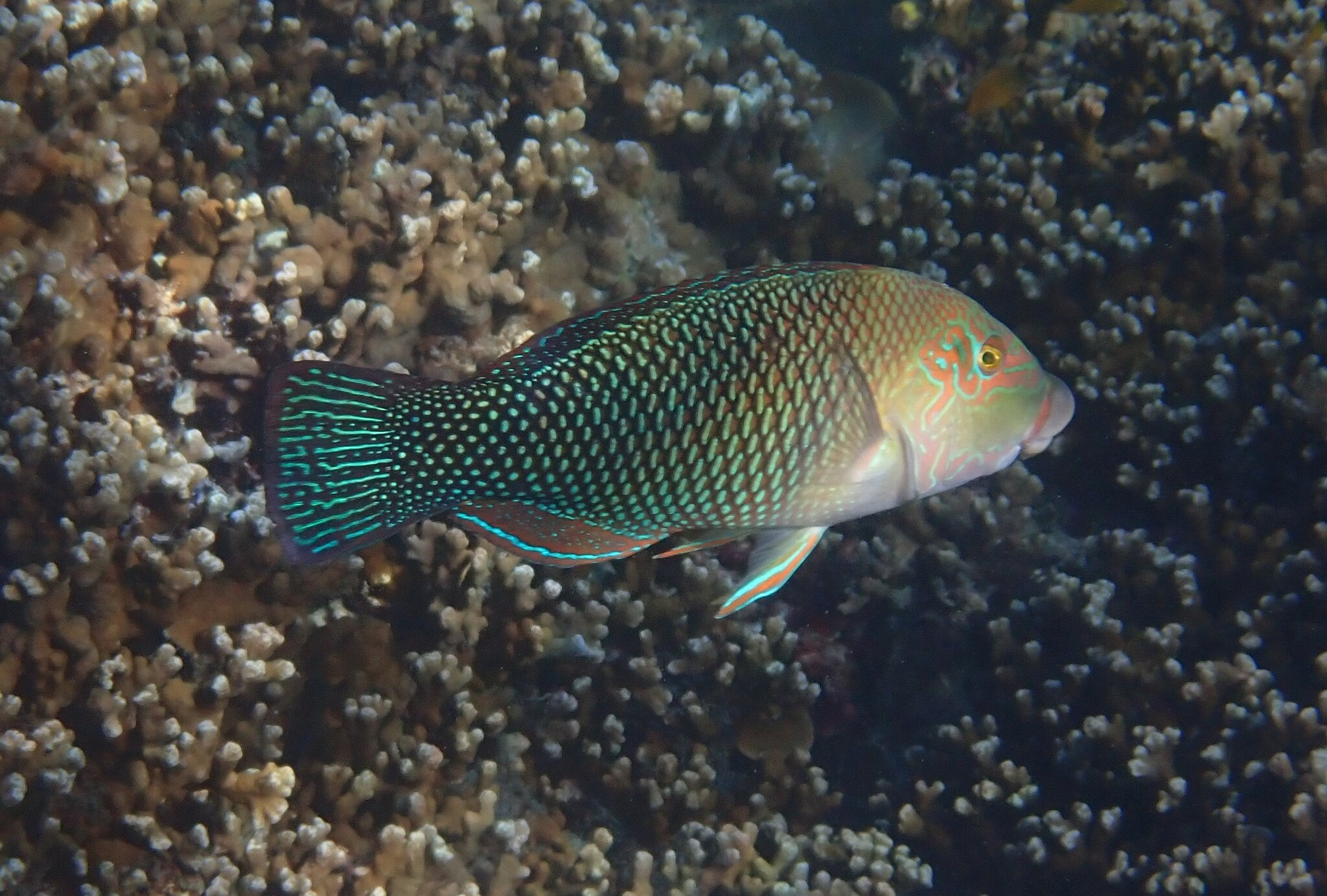

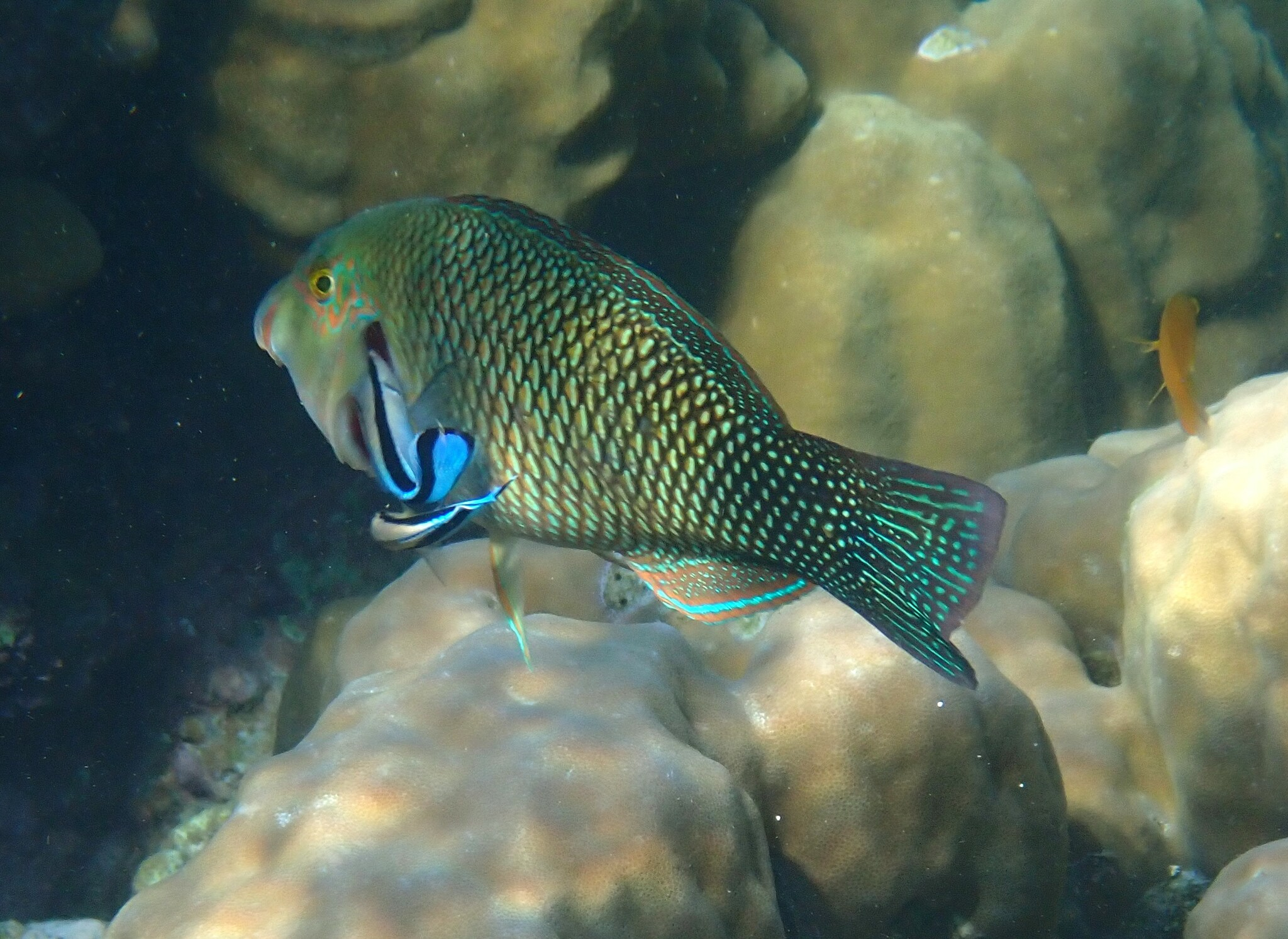
Attended by bluestreak cleaner wrasse

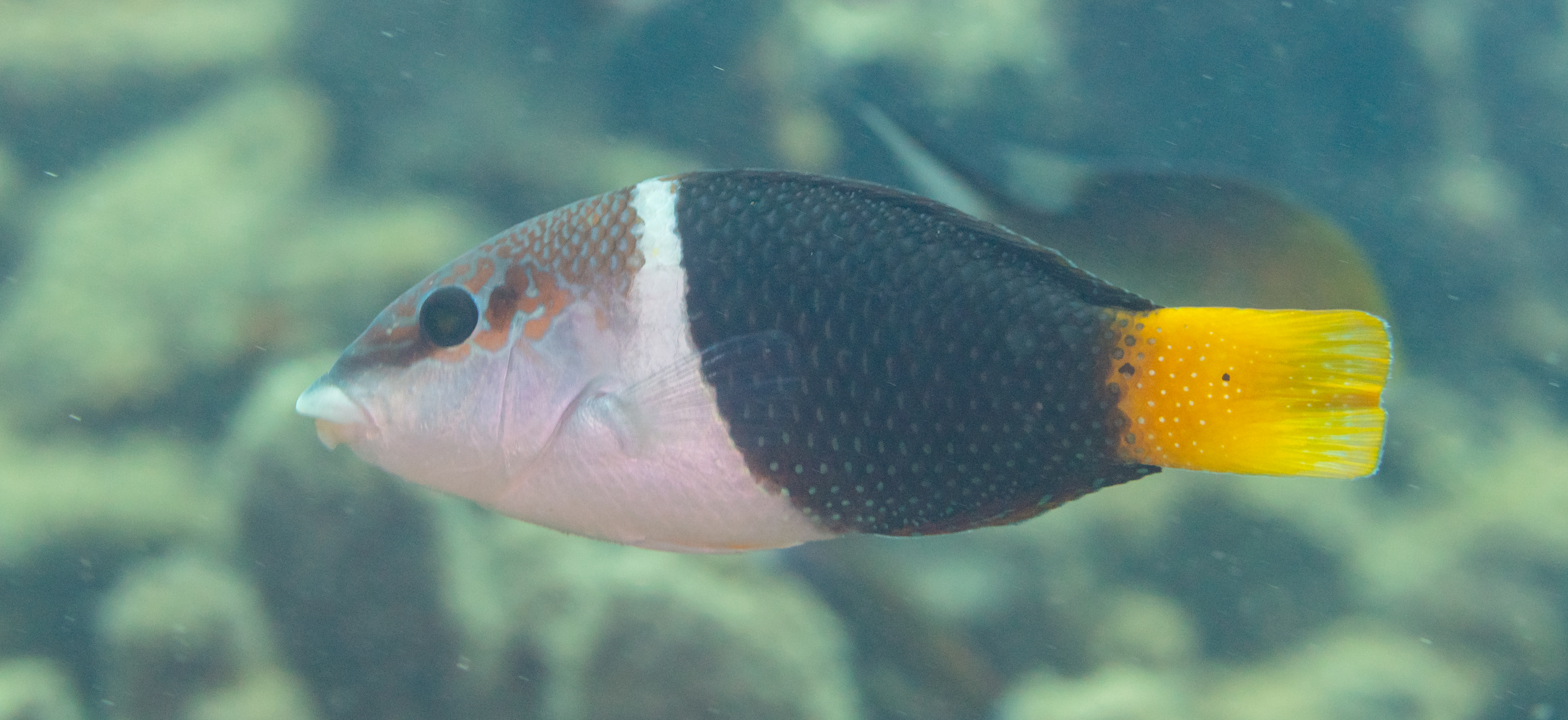
Nosy Tanikely, Madagascar
