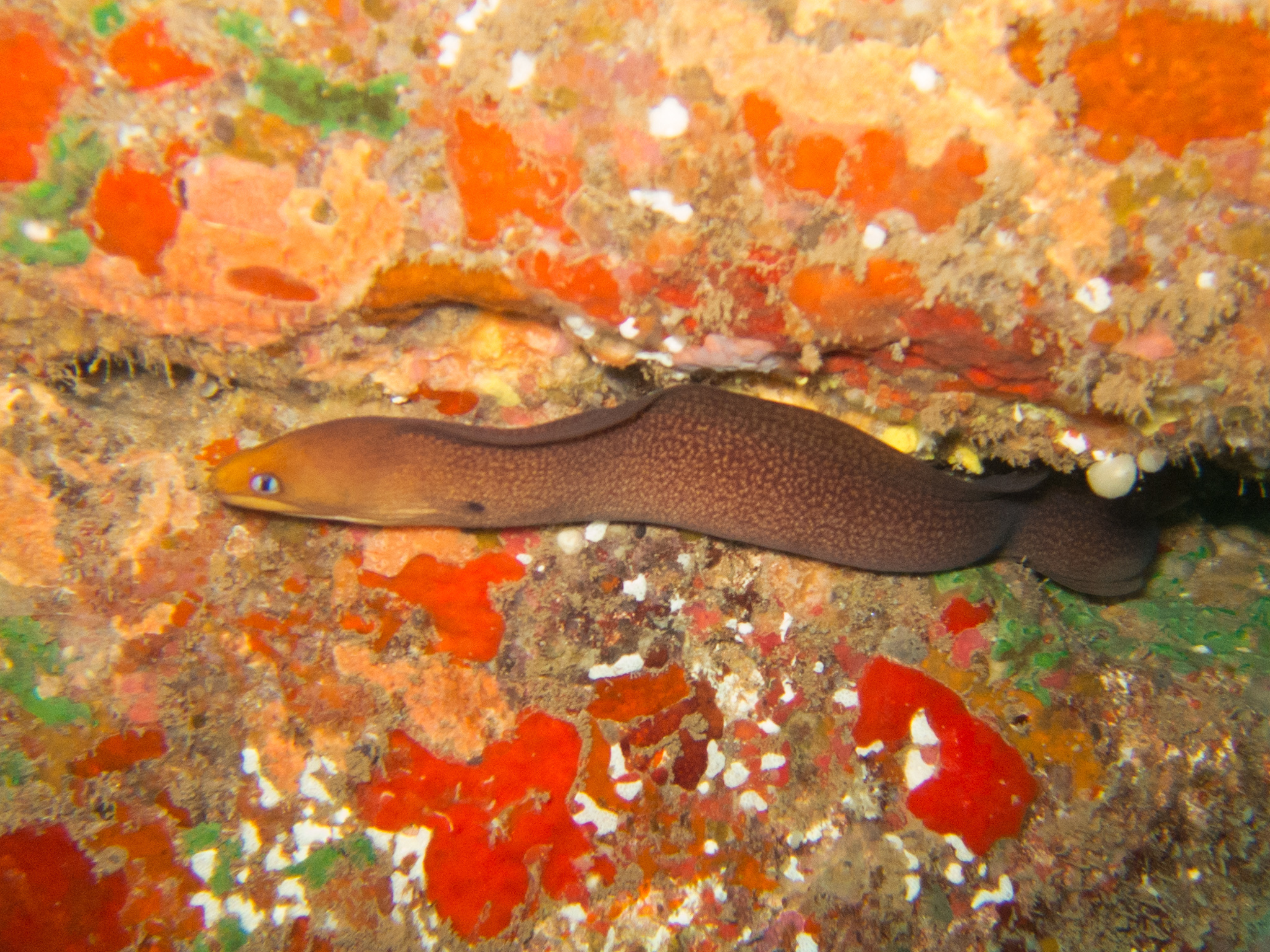

Conservation status
- Least Concern (IUCN 3.1)

Scientific classification
- Kingdom: Animalia
- Phylum: Chordata
- Class: Actinopterygii
- Order: Anguilliformes
- Family: Muraenidae
- Genus: Gymnothorax
- Species: G. melatremus

Binomial name
- Gymnothorax melatremus L. P. Schultz, 1953

= Gymnothorax melatremus =

Species of fish

Gymnothorax melatremus, the blackspot moray, dirty yellow moray or dwarf moray, is a moray eel from the Indo-Pacific East Africa to the Marquesas and Mangaréva, north to the Hawaiian Islands, south to the Australs islands. It rarely makes its way into the aquarium trade.

== Body characteristics ==
Gymnothorax melatremus have dorsal fins originating about midway between gill opening and corner of mouth. They have small and stout teeth and no canines, with a single row of teeth at the front of upper jaw with 1–2 median teeth, then teeth in two rows on each side of upper jaw, with longer and more slender teeth in the inner row and larger teeth at front of lower jaw. They grow up to 26 cm in length. They vary in color from gold, yellow, and white throughout their bodies with black spots in their gill openings and deep blue in their eyes.

== Diet ==
Like other moray eels, Gymnothorax melatremus is carnivorous. In the wild, it feeds on any crustaceans and small fish it can catch for example: ghost shrimp, dead squid, firefish, jawfish & etc.

=== Aquarium Diet ===
This moray eel is part of the aquarium hobby and you can feed it: Dead fishes, chopped cephalopods and small shrimp.

== Behaviour ==
They are mostly peaceful but they are still morays so they will attack vulnerable species like small bottom feeders and other types of small fishes. When scared or in danger it will attack and their bite can cause infections. They are mostly nocturnal so at day time they are very hard to find.

In small places they will get nervous and will be more alert to movements and prey.

== Aquarium Care ==
| Minimum tank size | 55 gallons |
| Minimum group size | 1 |
| Temperature | 72–78 °F (22–26 °C) |
| Salinity | 1.020-1.025 |
| pH | 8.1-8.4 |
| Difficulty level | Intermediate-expert |
