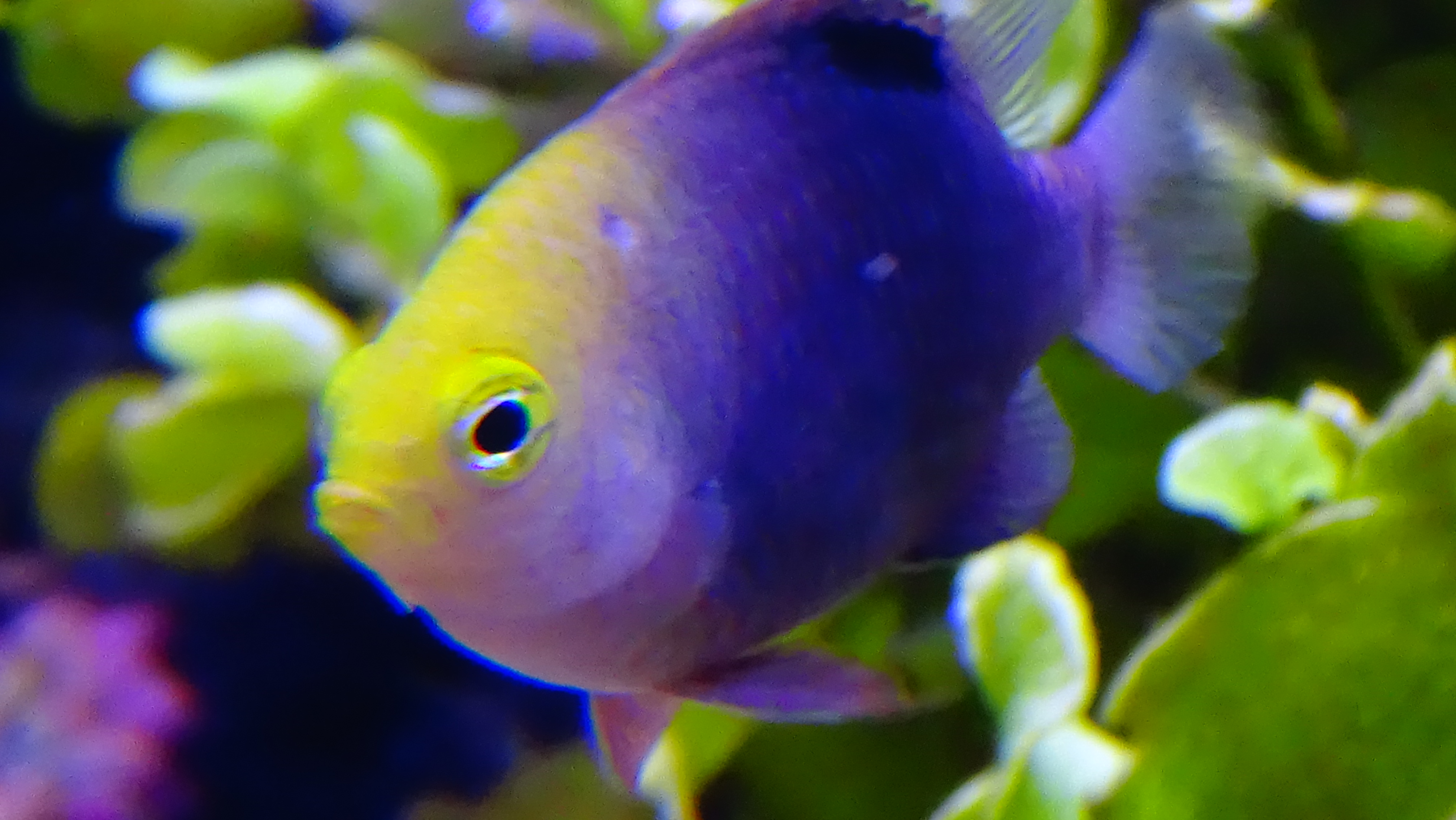

Conservation status
- Least Concern (IUCN 3.1)

Scientific classification
- Kingdom: Animalia
- Phylum: Chordata
- Class: Actinopterygii
- Order: Blenniiformes
- Family: Pomacentridae
- Genus: Chrysiptera
- Species: C. talboti

Binomial name
- Chrysiptera talboti Allen, 1975

Synonyms
- Glyphidodontops talboti Allen, 1975

= Chrysiptera talboti =

Species of fish

Chrysiptera talboti, known commonly as Talbot's damselfish and Talbot's demoiselle, is a species of damselfish. It is a marine fish from the eastern Indian Ocean and western Pacific.

== Etymology ==
The specific name honours the fisheries scientist and director of the Australian Museum in Sydney, Frank H. Talbot (1930–2024), who was the collector of the type.

Being a species of damselfish, it is commonly known as Talbot's damselfish and Talbot's demoiselle.

== Description ==
Chrysiptera talboti reaches six cm (2.4 in) in length. It has a yellow head, yellow ventral fins, and a large black spot at the back of its dorsal fin.

== Distribution ==
It is a marine fish from the eastern Indian Ocean and western Pacific.
