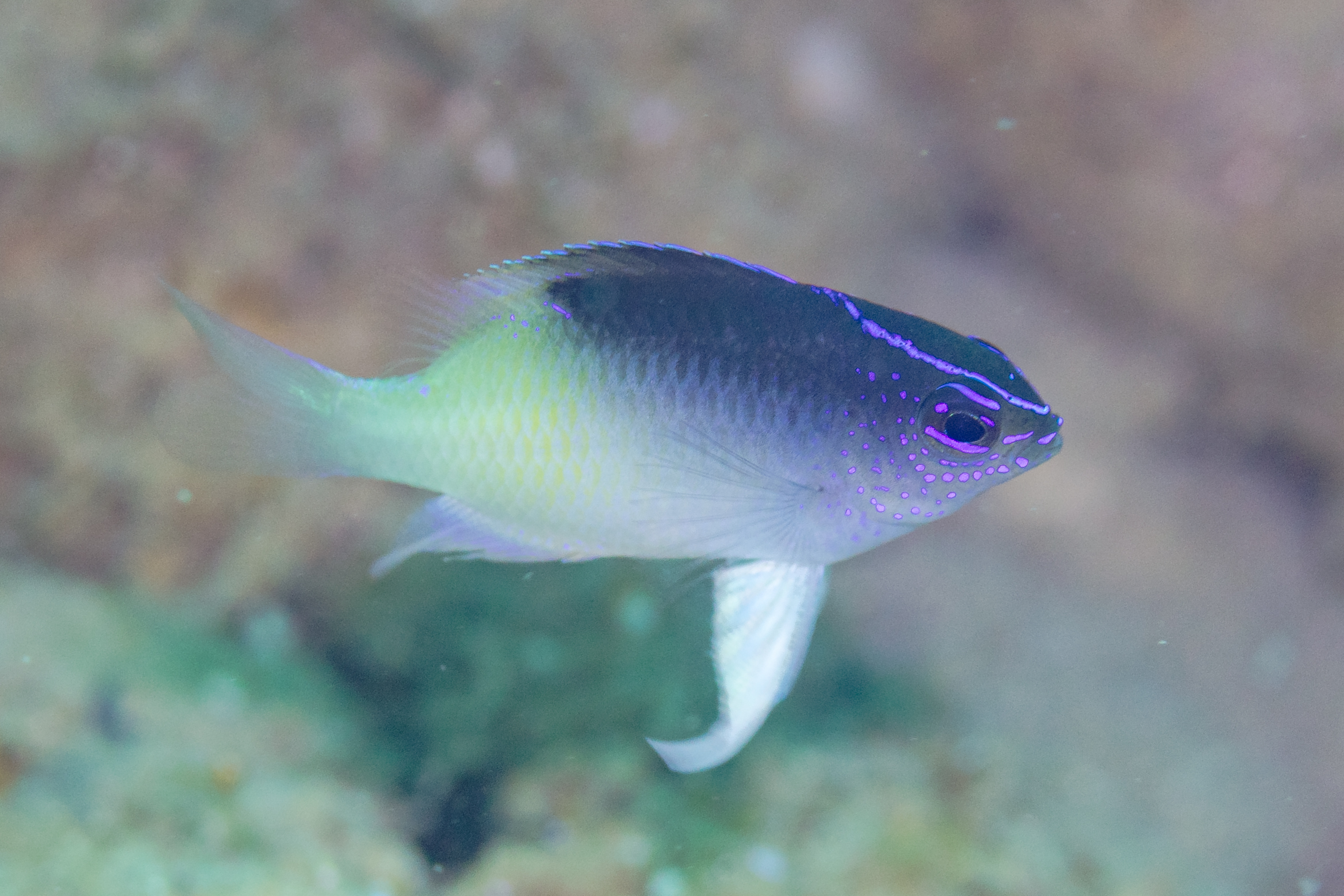

Conservation status
- Least Concern (IUCN 3.1)

Scientific classification
- Kingdom: Animalia
- Phylum: Chordata
- Class: Actinopterygii
- Order: Blenniiformes
- Family: Pomacentridae
- Genus: Chrysiptera
- Species: C. rollandi

Binomial name
- Chrysiptera rollandi (Whitley, 1961)

Synonyms
- Chromis rollandi Whitley, 1961; Glyphidodontops rollandi (Whitley, 1961); Pomachromis rollandi (Whitley, 1961)

= Chrysiptera rollandi =

Species of fish

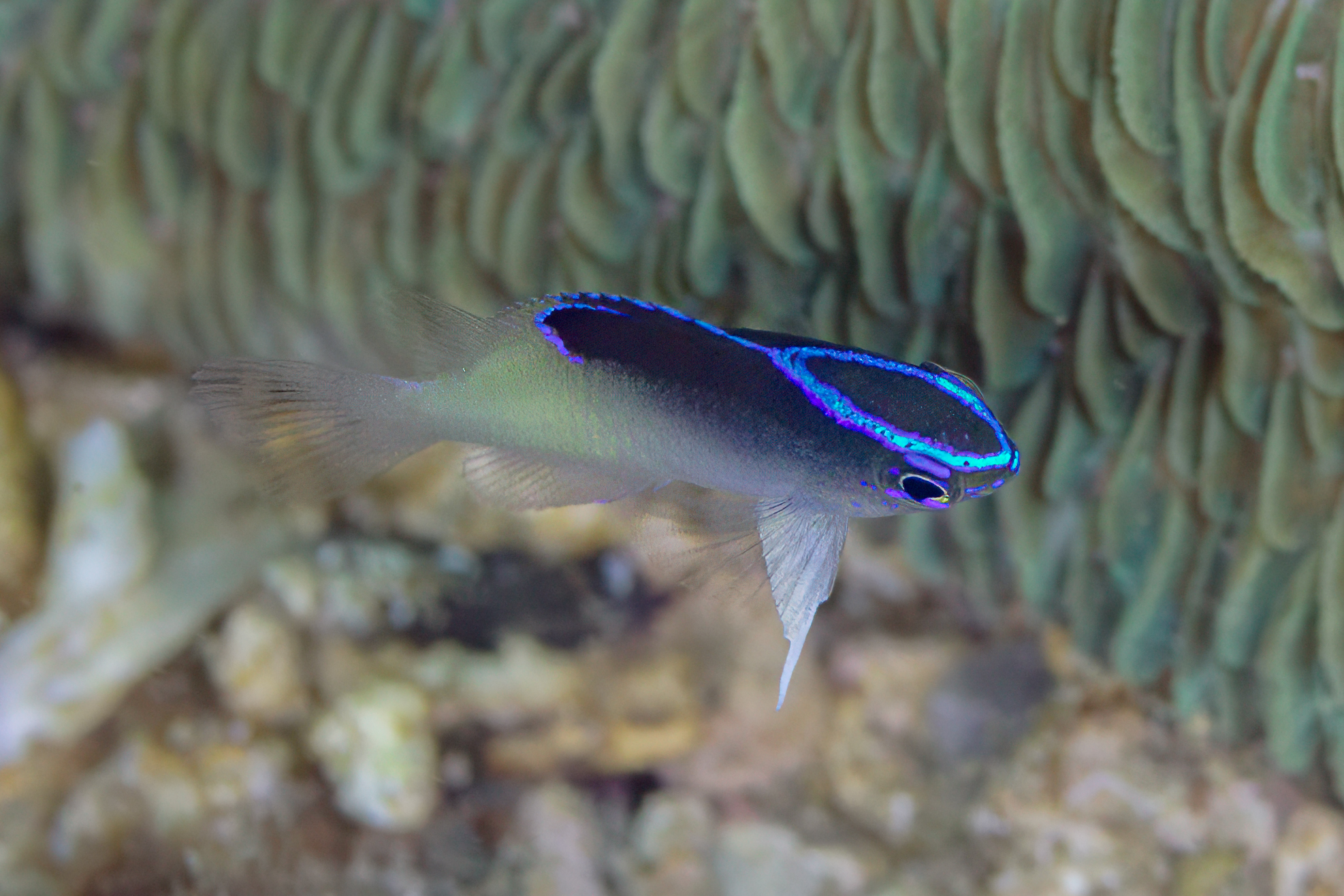
Detail of the front

Chrysiptera rollandi, commonly known as Rolland's demoiselle, is a species of damselfish in the family Pomacentridae.

== Distribution ==
Rolland's demoiselle is widespread throughout the tropical waters of the central Indo-Pacific region. It lives on reefs among corals and in lagoons and harbors.

== Description ==
The Rolland's demoiselle is a small size fish and can reach a maximum size of 7.5 cm (3.0 in) in length. It is dark brown with blue streaks and a cream-colored belly.

It is of some commercial importance in the aquarium trade.

== In aquarium ==
It is not very aggressive in attempting to extend territory but strongly territorial in protecting its ownership of area. If it feels any stress in the aquarium, its health deteriorates rapidly and may die next morning. Therefore, it is quite difficult to raise in aquarium for years.
