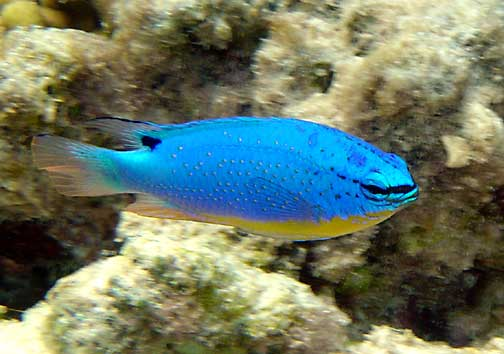

Conservation status
- Least Concern (IUCN 3.1)

Scientific classification
- Kingdom: Animalia
- Phylum: Chordata
- Class: Actinopterygii
- Order: Blenniiformes
- Family: Pomacentridae
- Genus: Chrysiptera
- Species: C. taupou

Binomial name
- Chrysiptera taupou (D.S. Jordan & Seale, 1906)

Synonyms
- Abudefduf taupou D.S. Jordan & Seale, 1906; Chrysiptera elizabethae Fowler, 1955; Abudefduf elizabethae (Fowler, 1955)

= Chrysiptera taupou =

Species of fish

Chrysiptera taupou, known commonly as the southseas devil, southseas demoiselle, and Fiji damsel, is a species of damselfish. It is native to the western Pacific Ocean from the Coral Sea to Samoa.

== Description ==
This fish reaches about 8 centimetres (3.1 in) in length.

== Biology ==
Habitat types include reefs and lagoons. The fish pairs up to breed and the male guards and tends the eggs.

== Uses ==
The fish has value as a specimen in public aquaria.

== In aquarium ==
It is very aggressive to other small fishes especially damsel and clown fishes. It is recommended to raise them in the large fish tank.
