= Garibaldi (disambiguation) =

Giuseppe Garibaldi (1807–1882) was a revolutionary and a father of modern Italy.

Garibaldi may also refer to:

== Places ==
- Garibaldi, Victoria, Australia
- The Garibaldi, a historic building in Hunters Hill, New South Wales, Australia
- Garibaldi, Rio Grande do Sul, Brazil
- Garibaldi, British Columbia, an abandoned settlement in British Columbia, Canada
- Garibaldi Ranges, a mountain range in British Columbia, Canada
  - Mount Garibaldi, British Columbia, Canada
  - Garibaldi Névé
  - Garibaldi Lake
  - Garibaldi Lake volcanic field
  - Garibaldi Provincial Park
  - Garibaldi Volcanic Belt
- Garibaldi Secondary School, British Columbia, Canada
- The Garibaldi School, Nottinghamshire, England
- Porta Garibaldi (disambiguation), a city gate and a district in Milan, Italy
- Plaza Garibaldi, a plaza in Mexico City, Mexico
- Garibaldi, Oregon, United States
- Garibaldi, Uruguay

== Ships ==
- Italian frigate Giuseppe Garibaldi, launched in 1860 for the Neapolitan navy
- ARA Garibaldi, an armoured cruiser for the Argentine Navy, launched in 1895
- Italian cruiser Giuseppe Garibaldi (1899), sunk in 1915
- Italian cruiser Giuseppe Garibaldi (1936), converted in 1961 into a guided missile cruiser, decommissioned in 1971
- Italian aircraft carrier Giuseppe Garibaldi, retired in 2024

== Transportation ==
- Milano Porta Garibaldi railway station, a major railway station in Milan, Italy
- Garibaldi station (Naples), a station of the Naples Metro
- Garibaldi station (Paris Metro), a Paris Metro station
- Garibaldi FS (Milan Metro), a station of the Milan Metro
- Garibaldi/Lagunilla metro station, a station of the Mexico City Metro at Plaza Garibaldi
- Garibaldi (Mexico City Metrobús), a BRT station in Mexico City

== Other uses ==
- Garibaldi (surname), an Italian surname
- Garibaldi (film), a 1961 film by Roberto Rossellini
- Garibaldi (fish), a large orange damselfish
- Garibaldi (group), Mexican pop group
- Garibaldi biscuit
- Associação Garibaldi de Esportes, Brazilian football (soccer) club
- Garibaldi (cocktail), a cocktail made of Campari and freshly squeezed orange juice
- Garibaldi Lifts Company, a ski resort operation now part of Whistler Blackcomb
- Garibaldi Legion, Confederate States of America Militia
- Garibaldi Guard, Union Army Infantry Regiment

== See also ==
- Gariboldi, a surname
