= Giribaldi =

Giribaldi is a surname. Notable people with the surname include:

- Beniamino Giribaldi (1942–2021), Italian organ builder
- Guillermo Giribaldi (1929–2001), Curaçaoan footballer
- Luigi Giribaldi (1925-2012), Italian industrialist and corporate raider
- Tomás Giribaldi (c. 1847-1930), Uruguayan composer

== See also ==
- Garibaldi (surname), another surname
