= Gerbaud =

- Gender: Male

Origin
- Region of origin: France

Other names
- Related names: Gerbeaud, Gerbeau; Garibald (Italian: Garibaldo > Garibaldi), Gerbold, Gerbald, Gerebald, Gervold, Gerwald

Gerbaud may refer to:

- Gerbold, bishop of Bayeux of the seventh century
- Gerebald, bishop of Châlon of the ninth century
- Gerbald, bishop of Liège of the Prince-Bishopric of Liège
- Gervold (Gerbaud, Gerwald)

There are numerous variants on this Germanic name, originally Gere-bold.

== Gerbeaud ==
- Emil Gerbeaud (1854–1919), Swiss-born Hungarian confectioner, chocolate producer, industrialist and entrepreneur
- Café Gerbeaud

== Gerbeau ==
- Hubert Gerbeau (1937–2021), French historian and writer

== See also ==
- Gerbert (disambiguation)
