= Chiarachromis =

Chiarachromis Temporal range: Ypresian

Scientific classification
- Kingdom: Animalia
- Phylum: Chordata
- Class: Actinopterygii
- Order: Blenniiformes
- Family: Pomacentridae
- Genus: †Chiarachromis
- Species: †C. salazzarii

Binomial name
- †Chiarachromis salazzarii Bellwood et al., 2025

Extinct genus of fishes

Chiarachromis is an extinct genus of pomacentrid ray-finned fish that lived in Italy during the Ypresian stage of the Eocene epoch.

== Distribution ==
The type species Chiarachromis salazzarii is known only from the Early Eocene Monte Bolca lagerstätte of Northern Italy.
