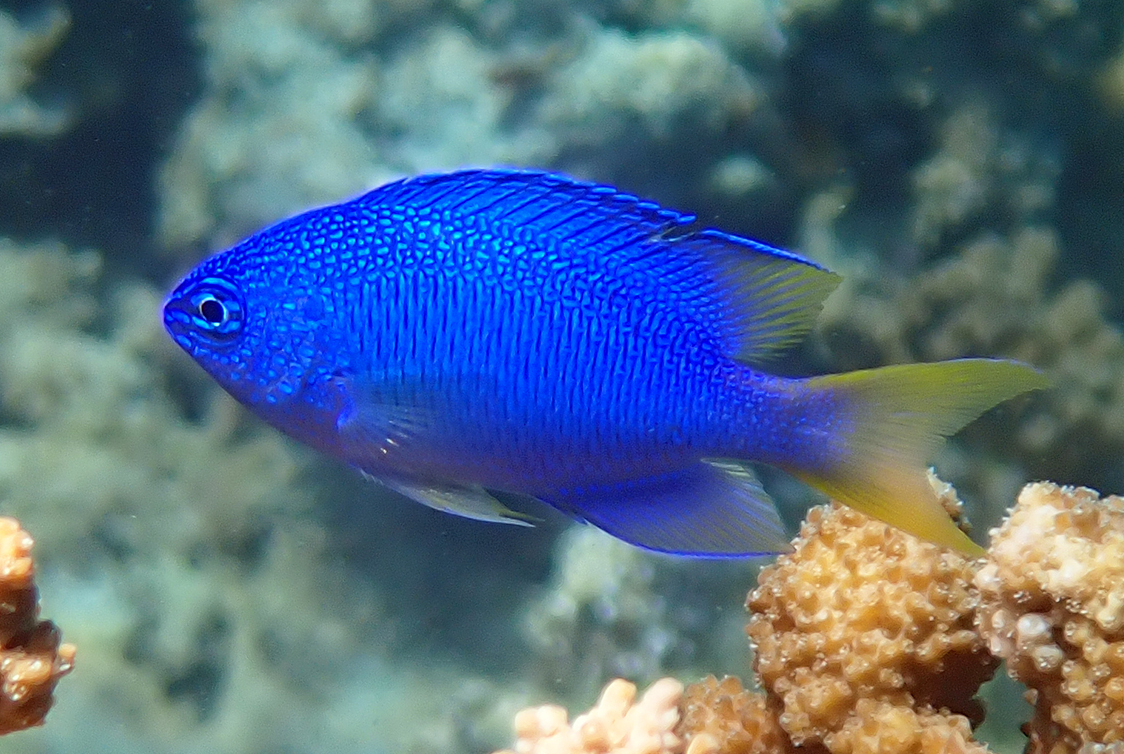
- Peacock damselfish (Pomacentrus pavo)

Scientific classification
- Kingdom: Animalia
- Phylum: Chordata
- Class: Actinopterygii
- Division: Teleostei
- Order: Blenniiformes
- Family: Pomacentridae; Bonaparte, 1832

Type species
- Pomacentrus pavo Bloch, 1787

Genera
- See text

= Pomacentridae =

Clownfish and damselfish Temporal range: Early Paleocene–present

Family of ray-finned fishes

Pomacentridae is a family of ray-finned fish, comprising the damselfishes and clownfishes. This family were formerly placed in the order Perciformes or as indeterminate percomorphs, but are now considered basal blenniiforms. They are primarily marine, while a few species inhabit freshwater and brackish environments (e.g., Neopomacentrus aquadulcis, N. taeniurus, Pomacentrus taeniometopon, Stegastes otophorus). They are noted for their hardy constitutions and territoriality. Many are brightly colored, so they are popular in aquaria.

== Taxonomy ==
Around 385 species are classified in this family, in about 31 genera. Of these, members of two genera, Amphiprion and Premnas, are commonly called clownfish or anemonefish, while members of other genera (e.g., Pomacentrus) are commonly called damselfish.

The members of this family were traditionally classified in four subfamilies: Amphiprioninae, Chrominae, Lepidozyginae, and Pomacentrinae., although more recent phylogenetic analyses instead support the four subfamilies Chrominae, Glyphisodontinae, Microspathodontinae, and Pomacentrinae, with the clownfishes nested within the latter subfamily.

The earliest known fossil damselfish is †Chaychanus from the Early Paleocene of Chiapas, Mexico.

=== Etymology ===
The name of the family is derived from the Greek words; poma roughly translates to the English "cover", referring to the fishes' opercula, and kentron is Greek for sting. The name refers to the serrations found along the margins of the opercular bones in many members of this family.

== Distribution and habitat ==
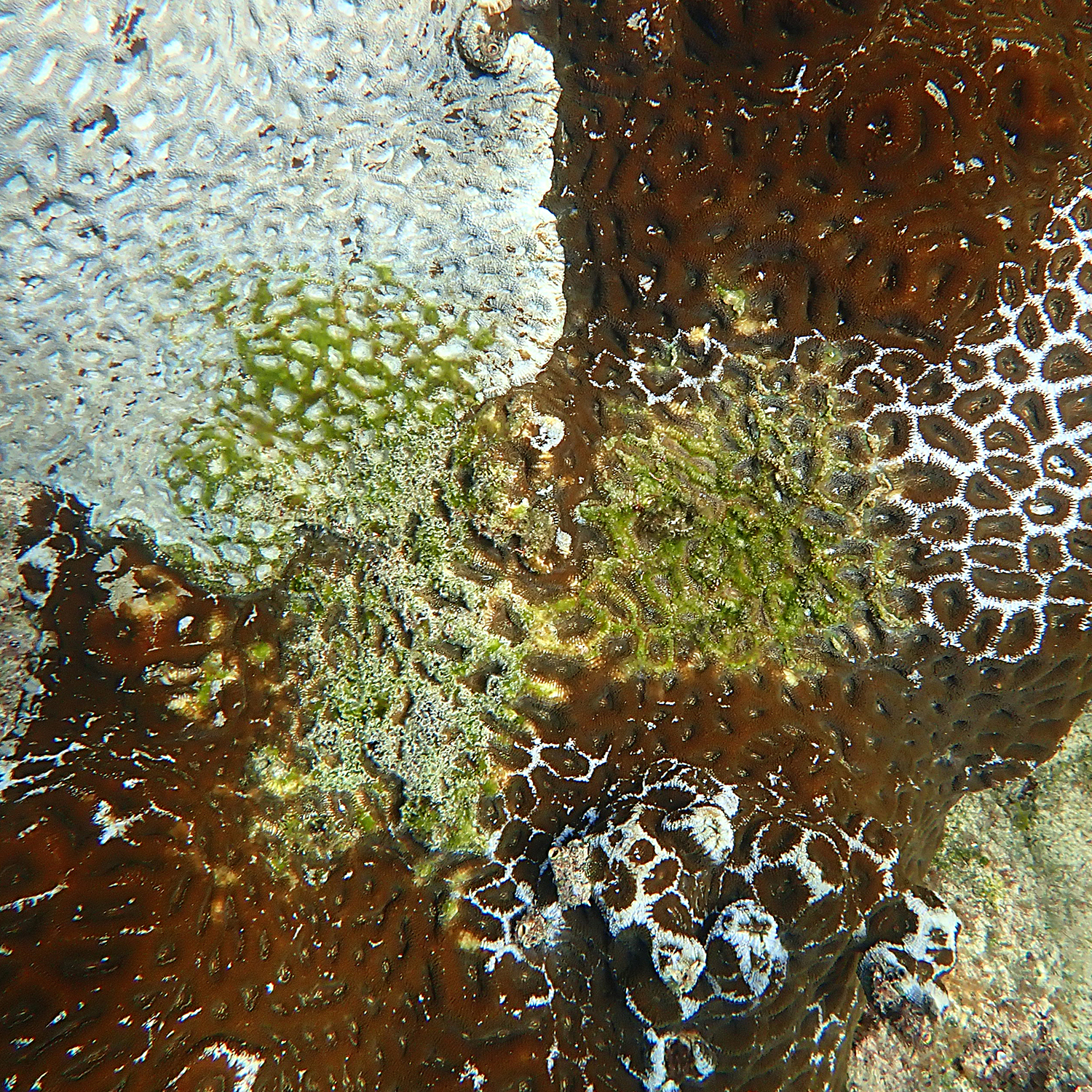
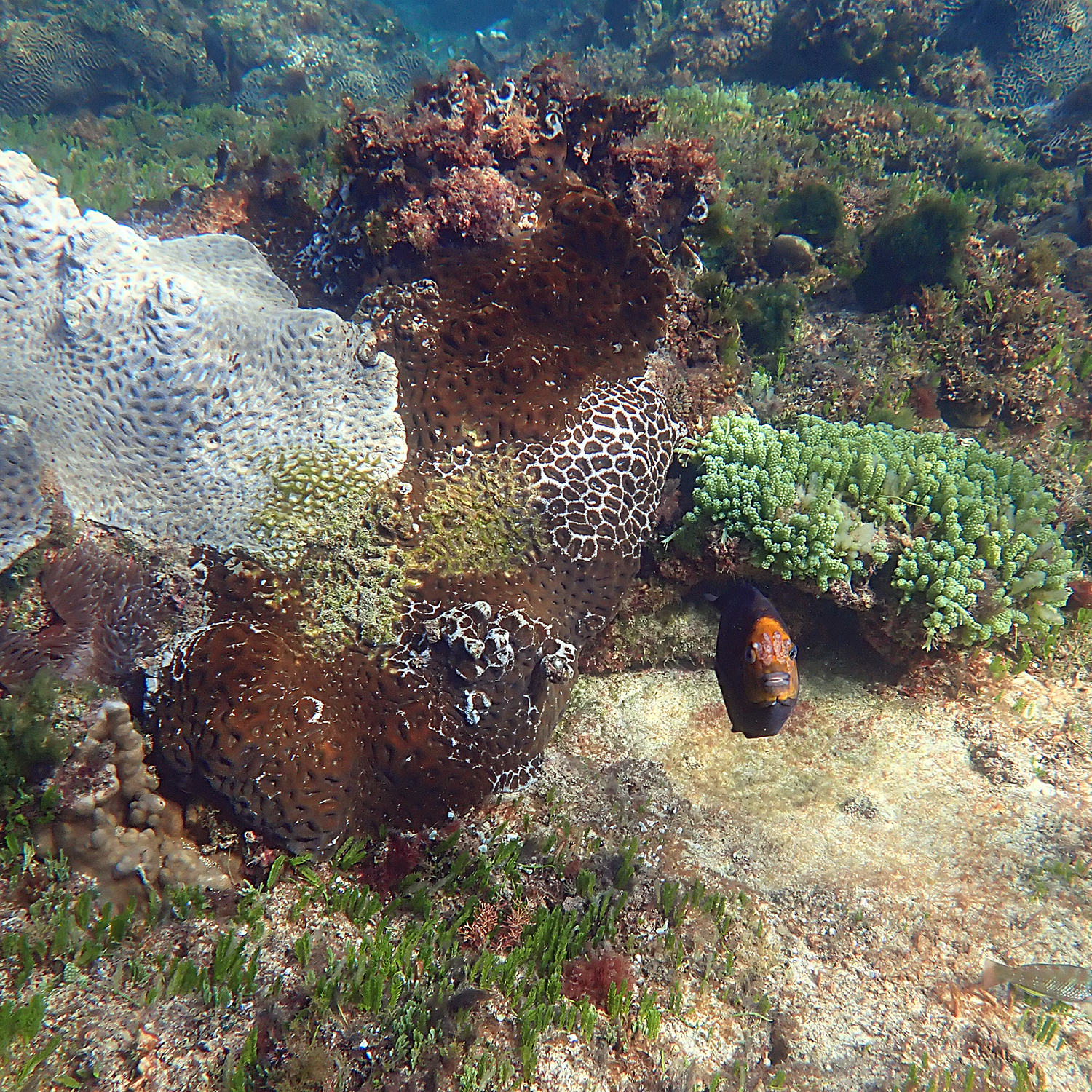
Algal patch cultivated by Parma polylepis

Pomacentrids are found primarily in tropical seas, with a few species occurring in subtropical waters (e.g., Hypsypops rubicundus). Most species are found on or near coral reefs in the Indo-West Pacific (from East Africa to Polynesia). The area from the Philippines to Australia hosts the greatest concentration of species. The remaining species are found in the Atlantic or eastern Pacific. Some species are native to freshwater or brackish estuarine environments.

Most members of the family live in shallow water, from 2 to 15 m (6 ft 7 in to 49 ft 3 in) in depth, although some species (e.g., Chromis abyssus) are found below 100 m (330 ft). Most species are specialists, living in specific parts of the reef, such as sandy lagoons, steep reef slopes, or areas exposed to strong wave action. In general, the coral is used as shelter, and many species can only survive in its presence.

=== Algae farming ===
The bottom-dwelling species are territorial, occupying and defending a portion of the reef, often centered on shelter. By keeping away other species of fish, some pomacentrids encourage the growth of thick mats of algae within their territories, leading to the common name farmerfish.

== Characteristics ==
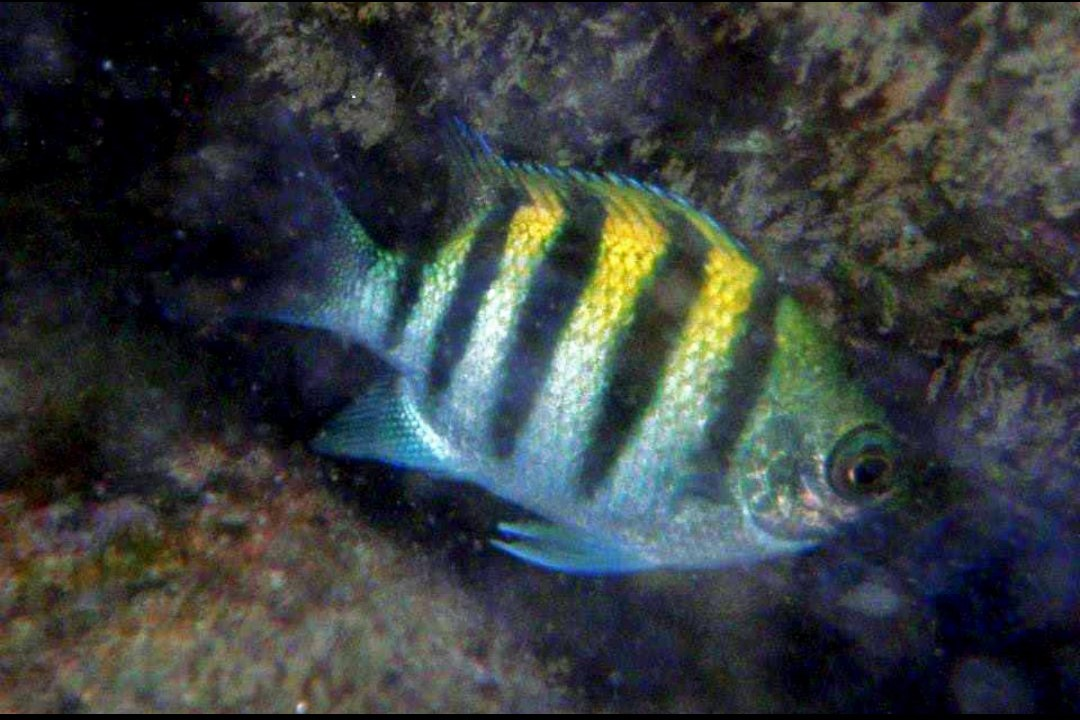
Indo-Pacific sergeant or damselfish in Sea of Dibba, Fujairah, UAE

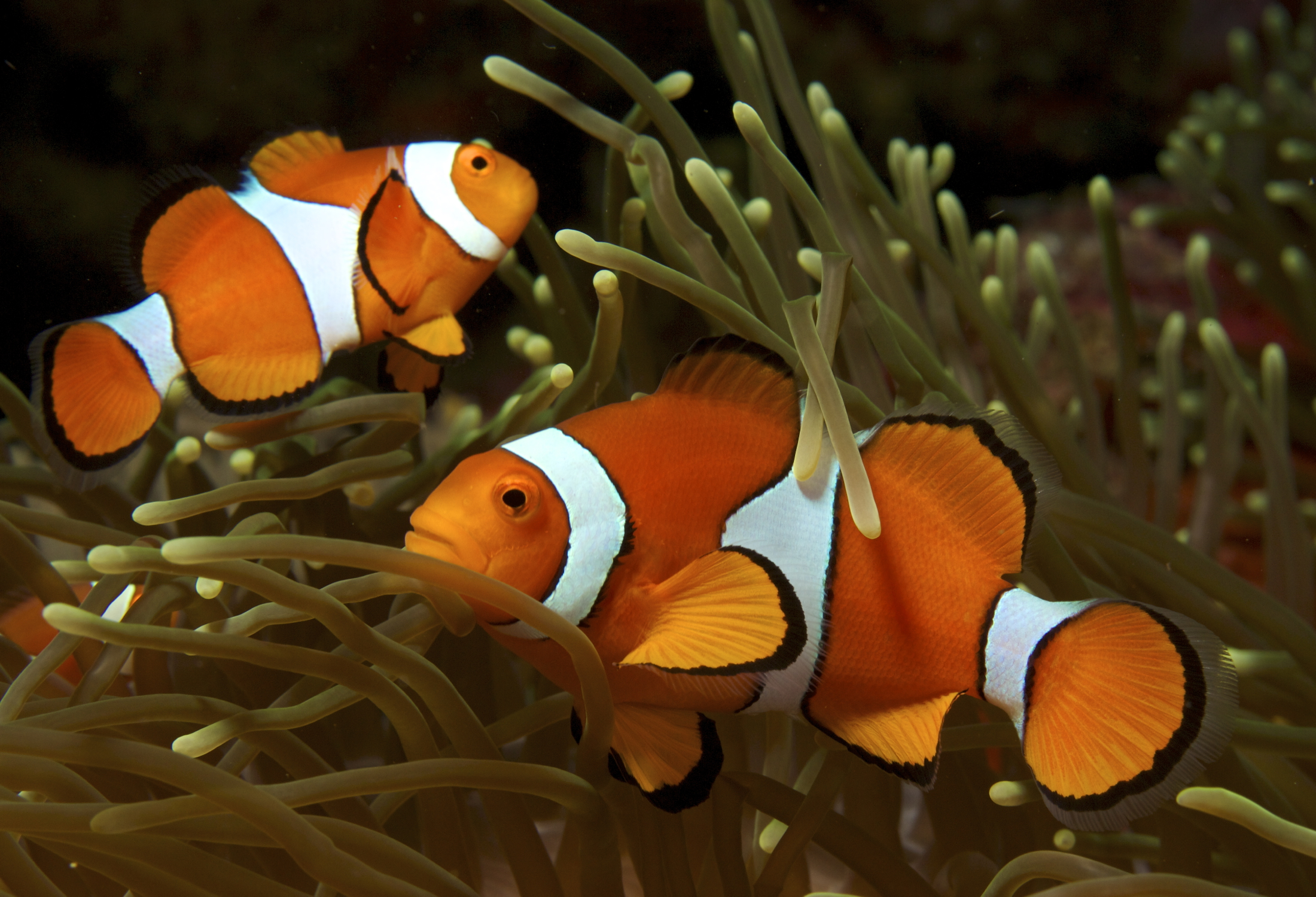
Clownfish with anemone

Most pomacentrids are relatively small. The tribe Microspathodontini includes the largest species and are collectively known as giant damselfishes, with the four largest species (Hypsypops rubicundus, Microspathodon bairdii, M. dorsalis and Nexilosus latifrons) reaching 30 cm (12 in) in length.

Pomacentrids have an orbiculate to elongated body shape, which is often laterally compressed. They have interrupted or incomplete lateral lines and they usually have a single nostril on each side (some species of Chromis and Dascyllus have two on each side). They have small- to medium-sized ctenoid scales. They have one or two rows of teeth, which may be conical or spatulate.

They display a wide range of colors, predominantly bright shades of yellow, red, orange, and blue, although some are a relatively drab brown, black, or grey. The young are often a different, brighter color than adults.

Pomacentrids are omnivorous or herbivorous, feeding on algae, plankton, and small bottom-dwelling crustaceans, depending on their precise habitats. Only a small number of genera, such as Cheiloprion, eat the coral where they live.

They also engage in symbiotic relationship with cleaner gobies of genus Elacatinus, allowing the gobies to feed on ectoparasites on their bodies. Clownfish also have mutualistic relationships with anemones. The anemone protects the clownfish while the clownfish rids parasites.

== Lifecycle ==
Before breeding, the males clear an area of algae and invertebrates to create a nest. They engage in ritualised courtship displays, which may consist of rapid bursts of motion, chasing or nipping females, stationary hovering, or wide extension of their fins. After being attracted to the site, the female lays a string of sticky eggs that attach to the substrate. The male swims behind the female as she lays the eggs, and fertilises them externally. Varying by species, brood sizes range from 50 to 1000 eggs.

The male guards the nest for the two to seven days needed for the eggs to hatch. The transparent larvae are 2 to 4 mm (0.079 to 0.157 in) long. They go through a pelagic stage, which depending on the species, can last as little as a week or more than a month. When they arrive at a suitable environment, the young settle and adopt their juvenile colors.

In captivity, pomacentrids live up to 18 years, but they probably do not live longer than 10 to 12 years in the wild.

== Genera ==
The 5th edition of Fishes of the World recognises 31 genera in three subfamilies in the family Pomacentridae:

† means extinct

- Subfamily Chrominae Allen, 1975
  - Acanthochromis Gill, 1863:
  - Altrichthys Allen, 1999
  - Azurina D.S. Jordan & McGregor, 1898
  - Chromis Cuvier, 1814
  - Dascyllus Cuvier, 1829
- Subfamily Lepidozyginae Allen, 1975
  - Lepidozygus Günther, 1862
- Subfamily Pomacentrinae Bonaparte, 1831
  - Abudefduf Fabricius, 1775
  - Amblyglyphidodon Bleeker, 1877
  - Amblypomacentrus Bleeker, 1877
  - Amphiprion Bloch & Schneider, 1801
  - Cheiloprion M.C.W. Weber, 1913
  - Chrysiptera Swainson, 1839
  - Dischistodus Gill, 1863
  - Hemiglyphidodon Bleeker, 1877
  - Hypsypops Gill, 1861
  - Mecaenichthys Whitley, 1929
  - Microspathodon Günther, 1862
  - Neoglyphidodon Allen, 1991
  - Neopomacentrus Allen, 1975
  - Nexilosus Heller & Snodgrass, 1903
  - Parma Günther, 1862
  - Plectroglyphidodon Fowler & Ball, 1824
  - Pomacentrus Lacépède, 1802
  - Pomachromis Allen & Randall, 1974
  - Premnas Cuvier, 1816
  - Pristotis Rüppell, 1838
  - Similiparma Hemsley, 1986
  - Stegastes Jenyns, 1840
  - Teixeirichthys J. L. B. Smith, 1953
- †Chiarachromis Bellwood, Bannikov & Zorzin, 2025
- †Chaychanus Cantalice, Alvarado-Ortega & Bellwood, 2020
- †Izuus Saito, 1938
- †Lorenzichthys Bellwood, 1999
- †Sorbinichromis Bannikov & Bellwood, 2014
- †Palaeopomacentrus Bellwood & Sorbini, 1996

Other authorities recognise 4 subfamilies and classify the family as follows:

- Subfamily Chrominae
  - Azurina
  - Chromis
  - Dascyllus
  - Pycnochromis Fowler, 1941
- Subfamily Glyphisodontinae
  - Abudefduf
- Subfamily Microspathodontinae
  - Lepidozygus
  - Mecaenichthys
  - Parma
  - Plectroglyphidodon
  - Stegastes
  - Tribe Microspathodontini
    - Hypsypops
    - Microspathodon
    - Nexilosus
    - Similiparma
- Subfamily Pomacentrinae
  - Tribe Amphiprionini
    - Amphiprion
    - Premnas
  - Tribe Cheiloprionini
    - Cheiloprion
    - Chrysiptera
    - Dischistodus
    - Pomachromis
  - Tribe Hemiglyphidodontini
    - Acanthochromis
    - Altrichthys
    - Amblyglyphidodon
    - Hemiglyphidodon
    - Neoglyphidodon
  - Tribe Pomacentrini
    - Amblypomacentrus
    - Neopomacentrus
    - Pomacentrus
    - Pristotis
    - Teixeirichthys
- †Palaeopomacentrus
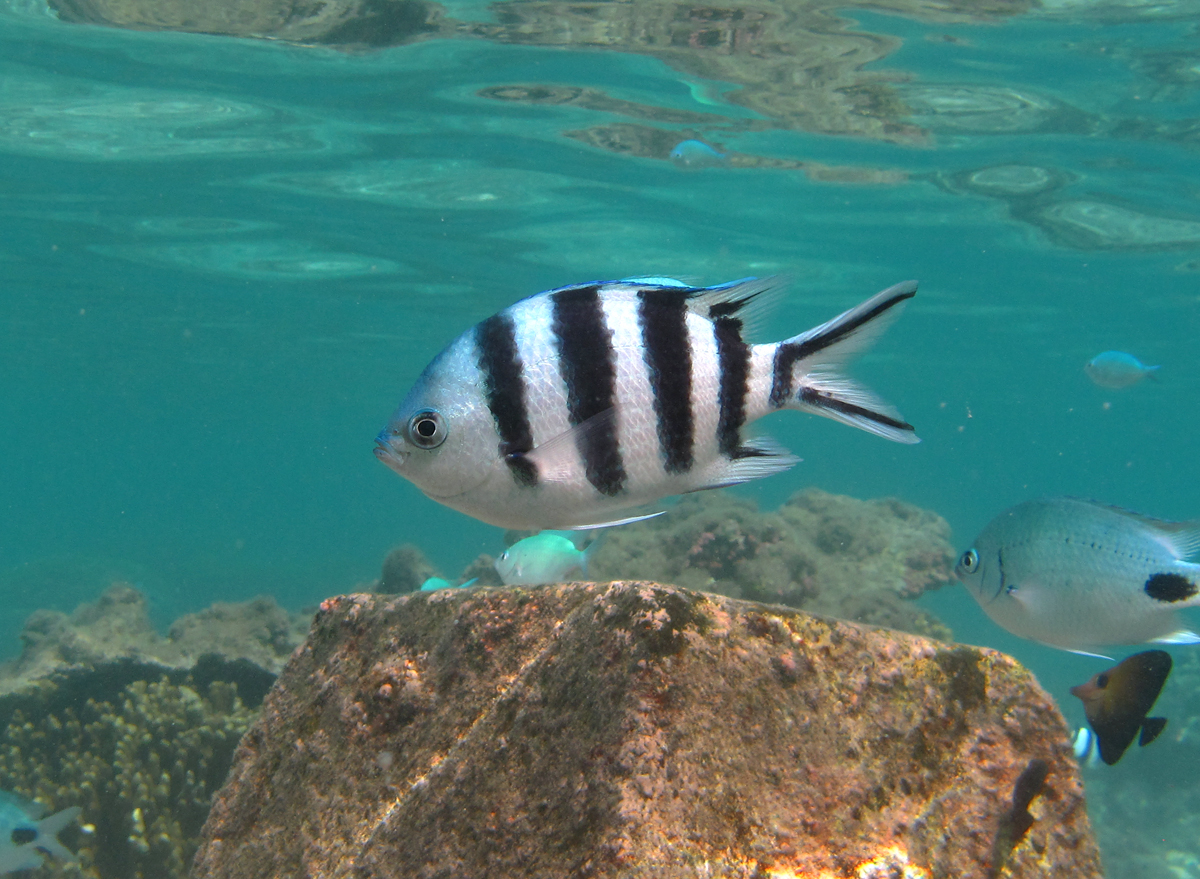
Abudefduf sexfasciatus

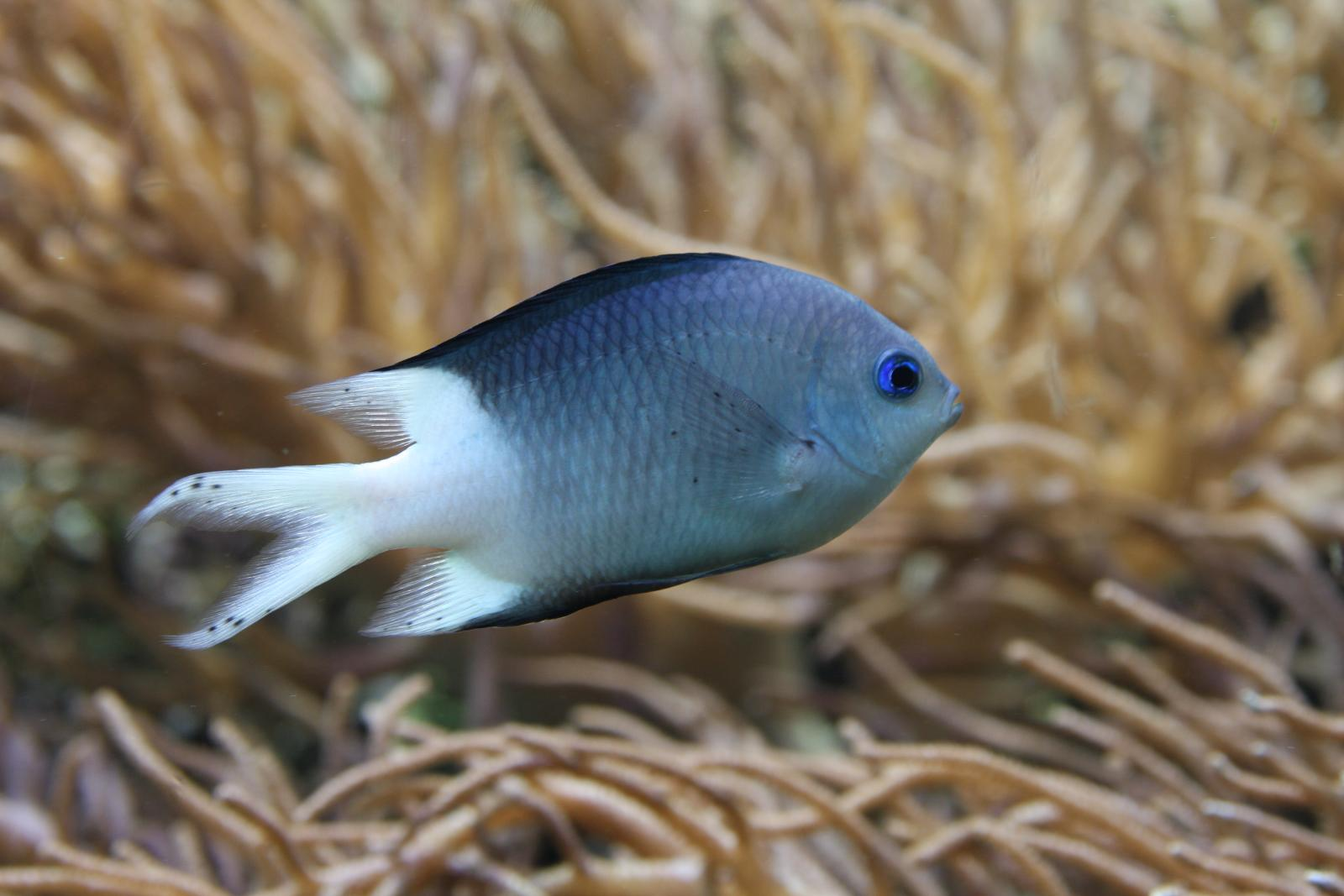
Acanthochromis polyacanthus

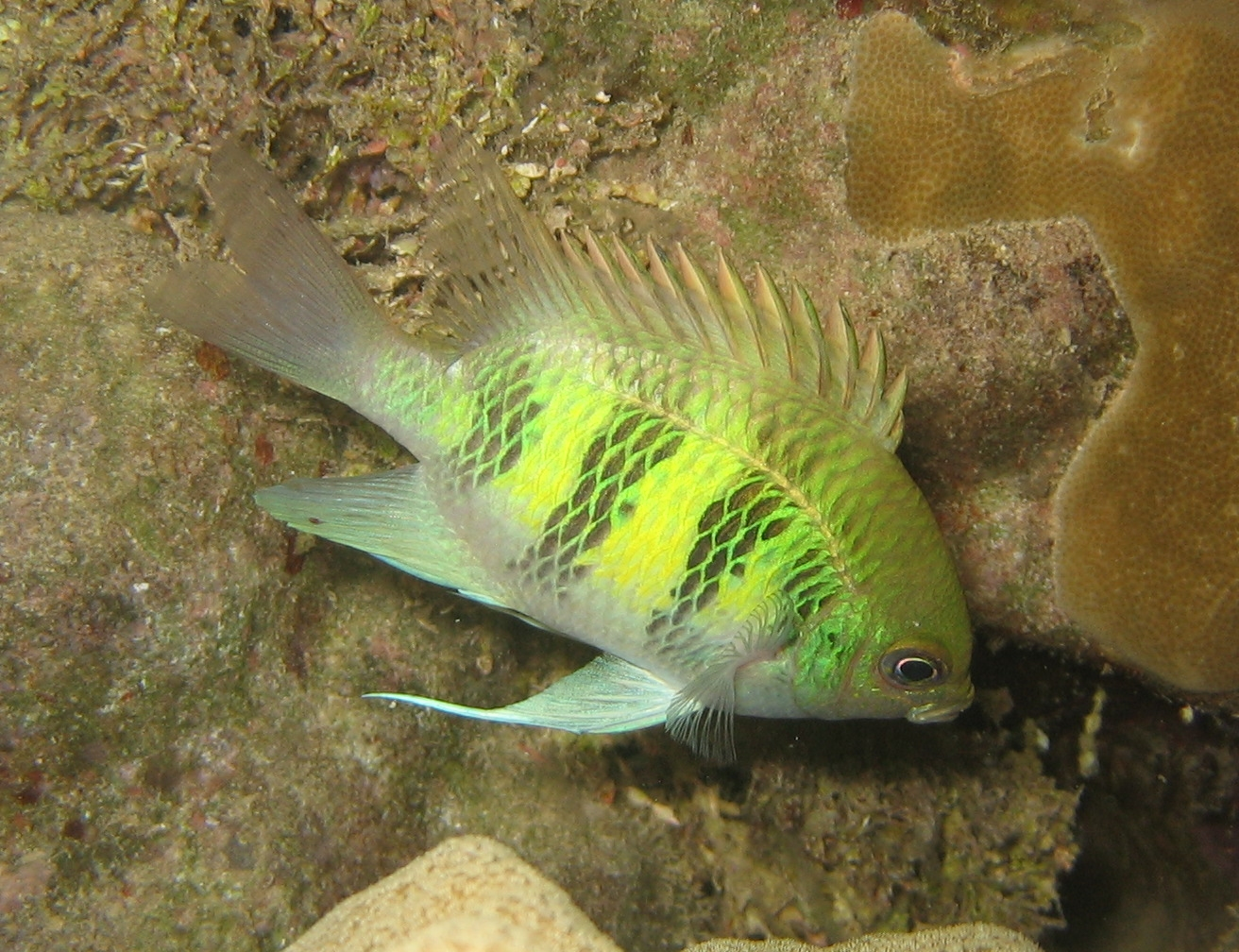
Amblyglyphidodon curacao

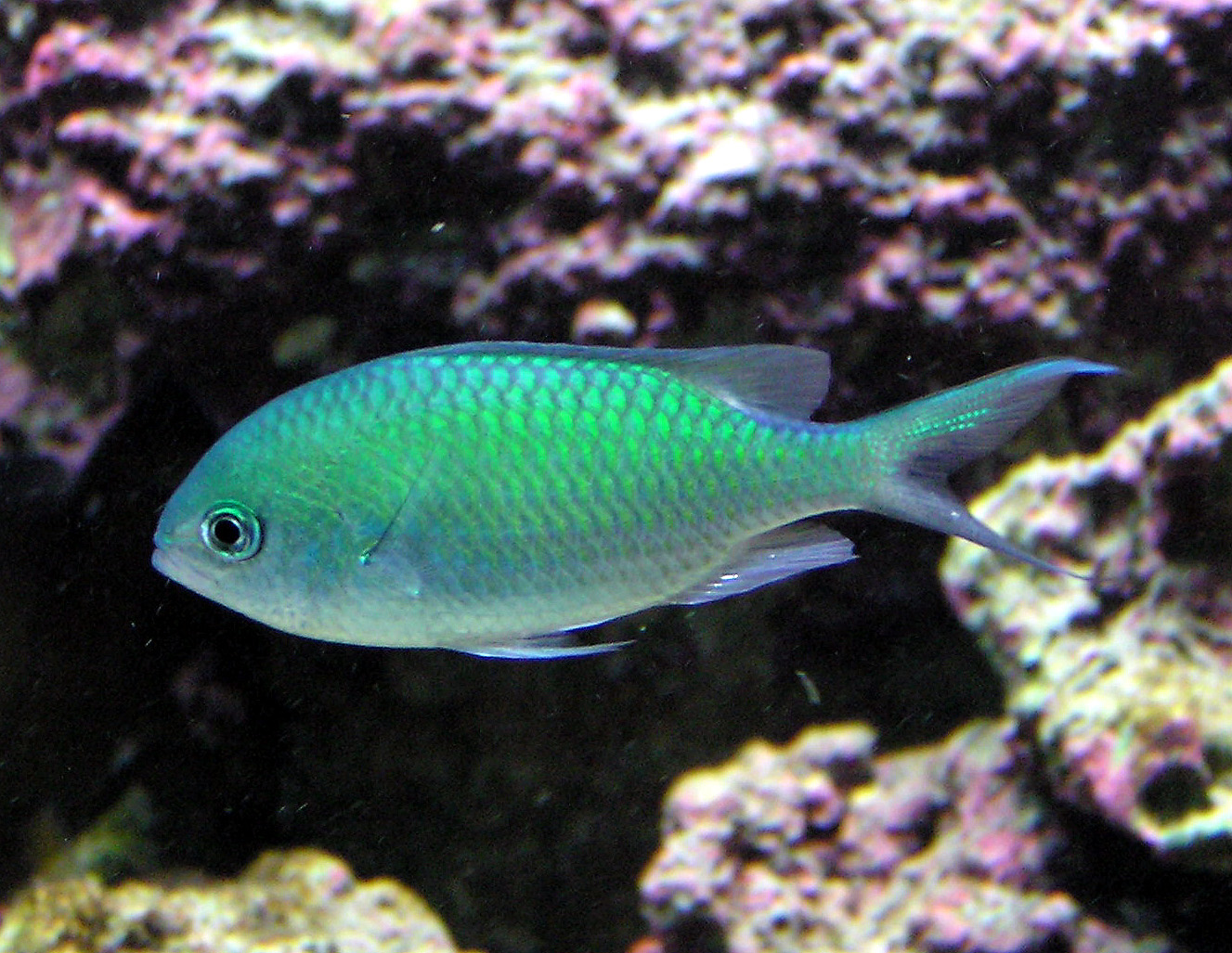
Chromis viridis

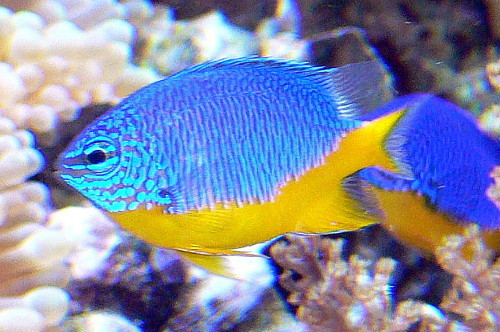
Chrysiptera hemicyanea

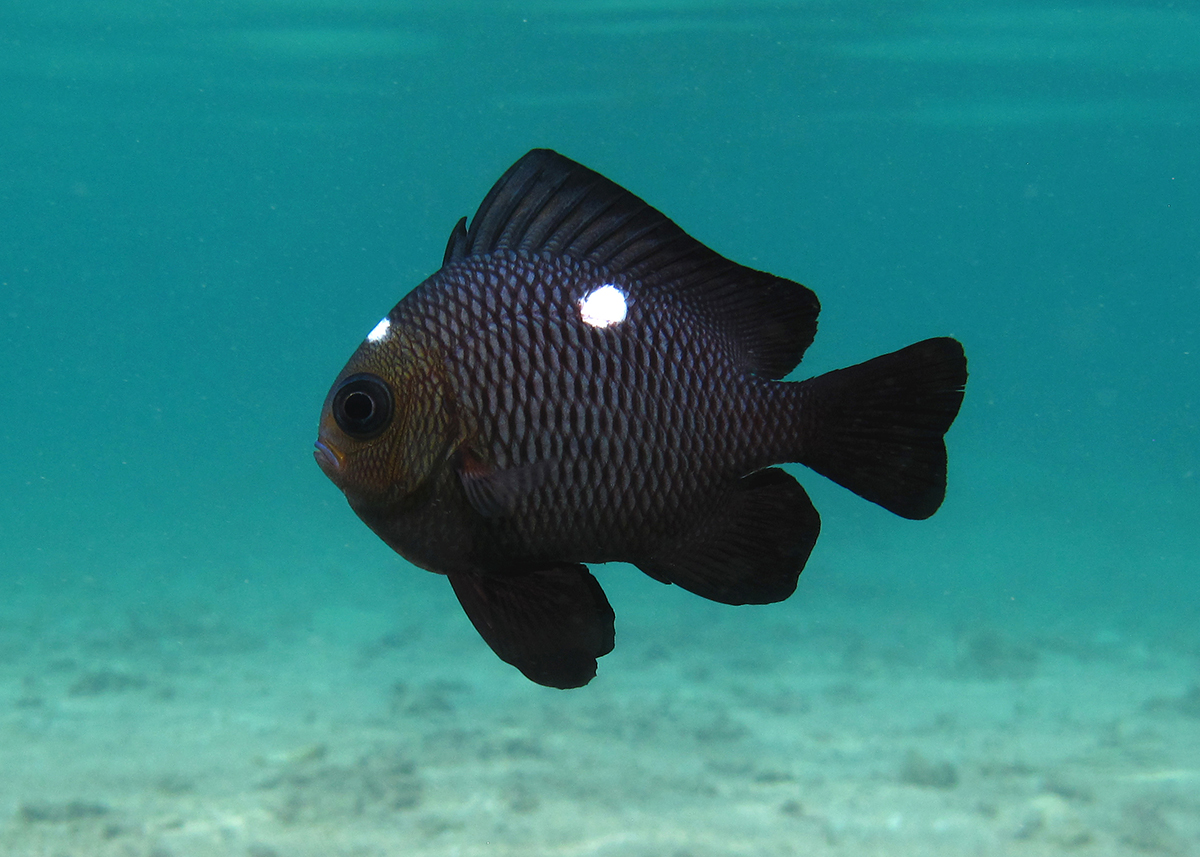
Dascyllus trimaculatus

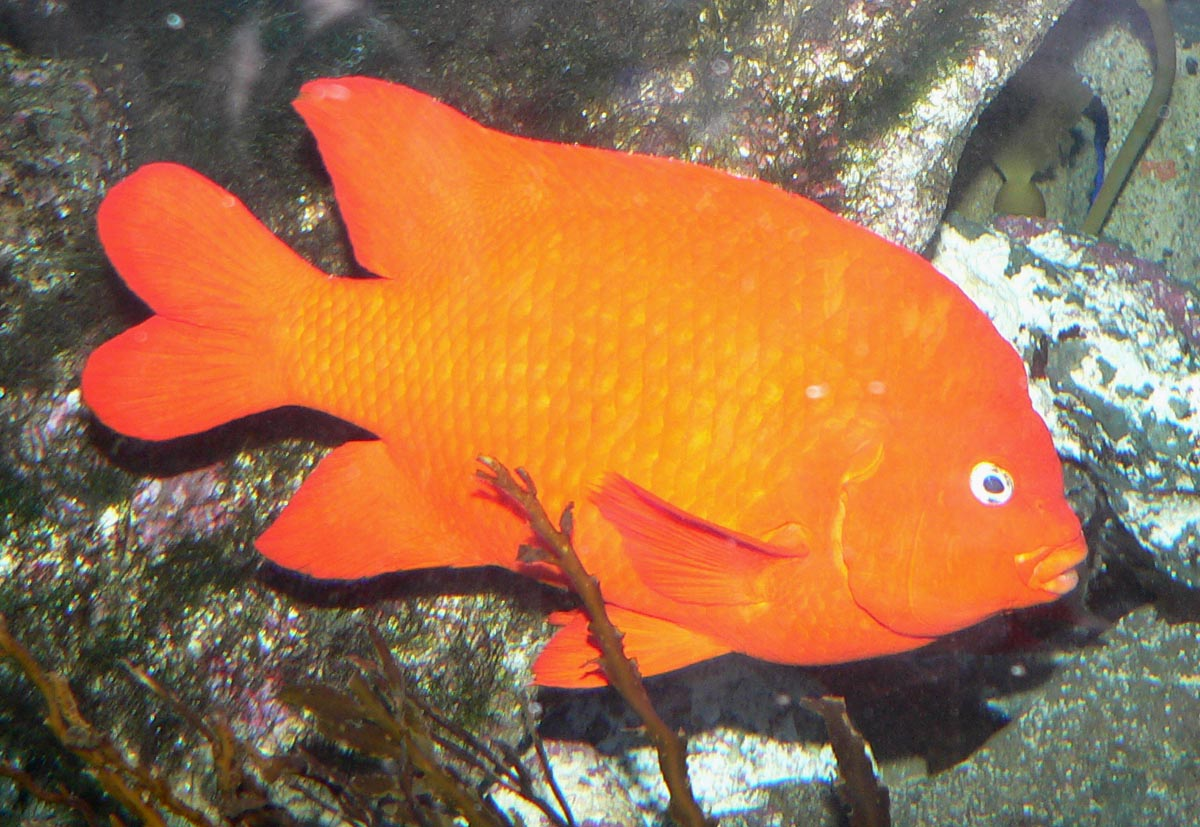
Hypsypops rubicundus

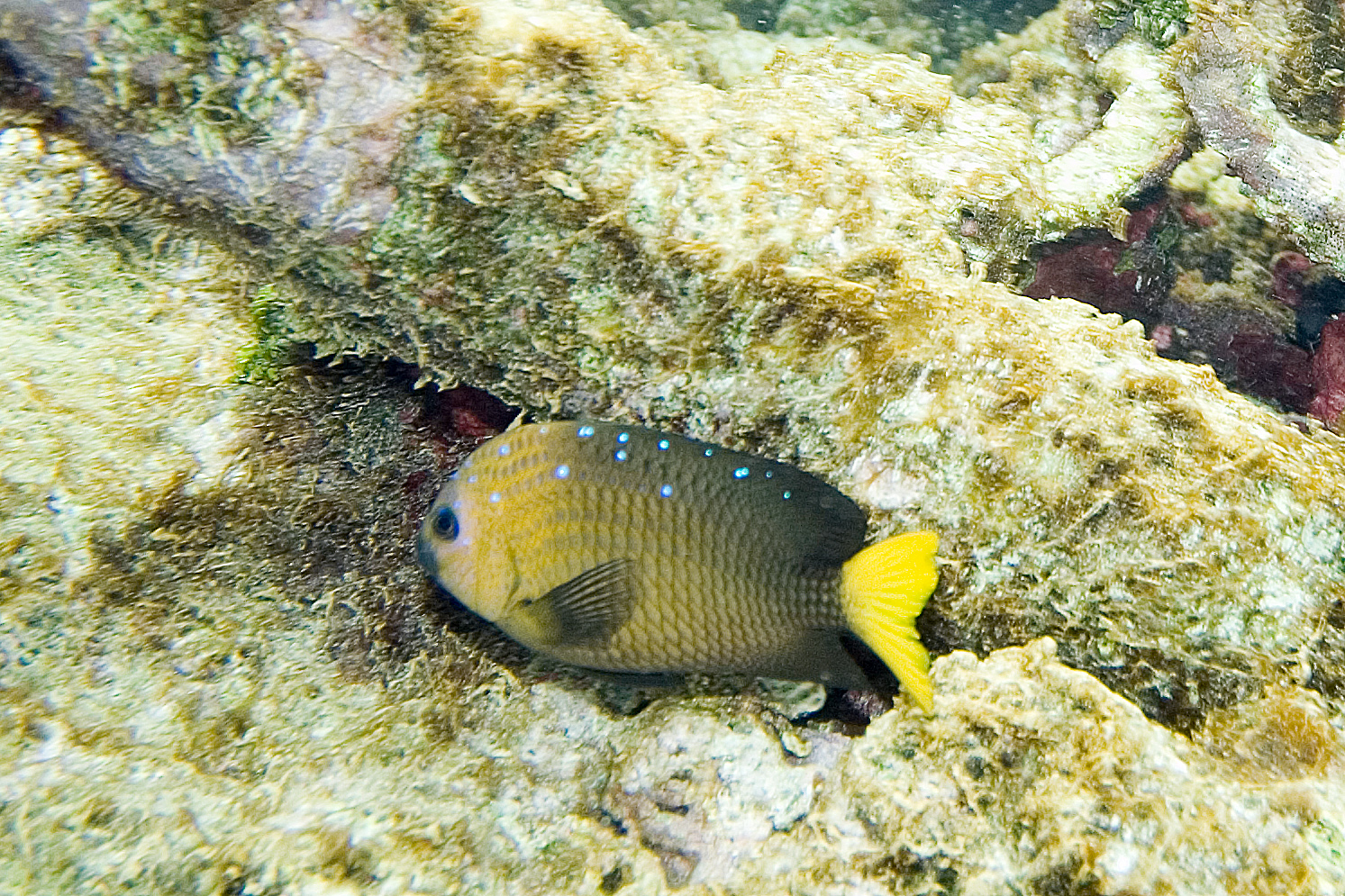
Microspathodon chrysurus

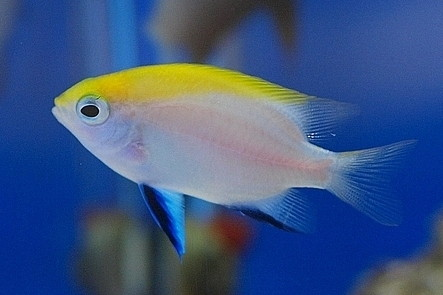
Neoglyphidodon melas

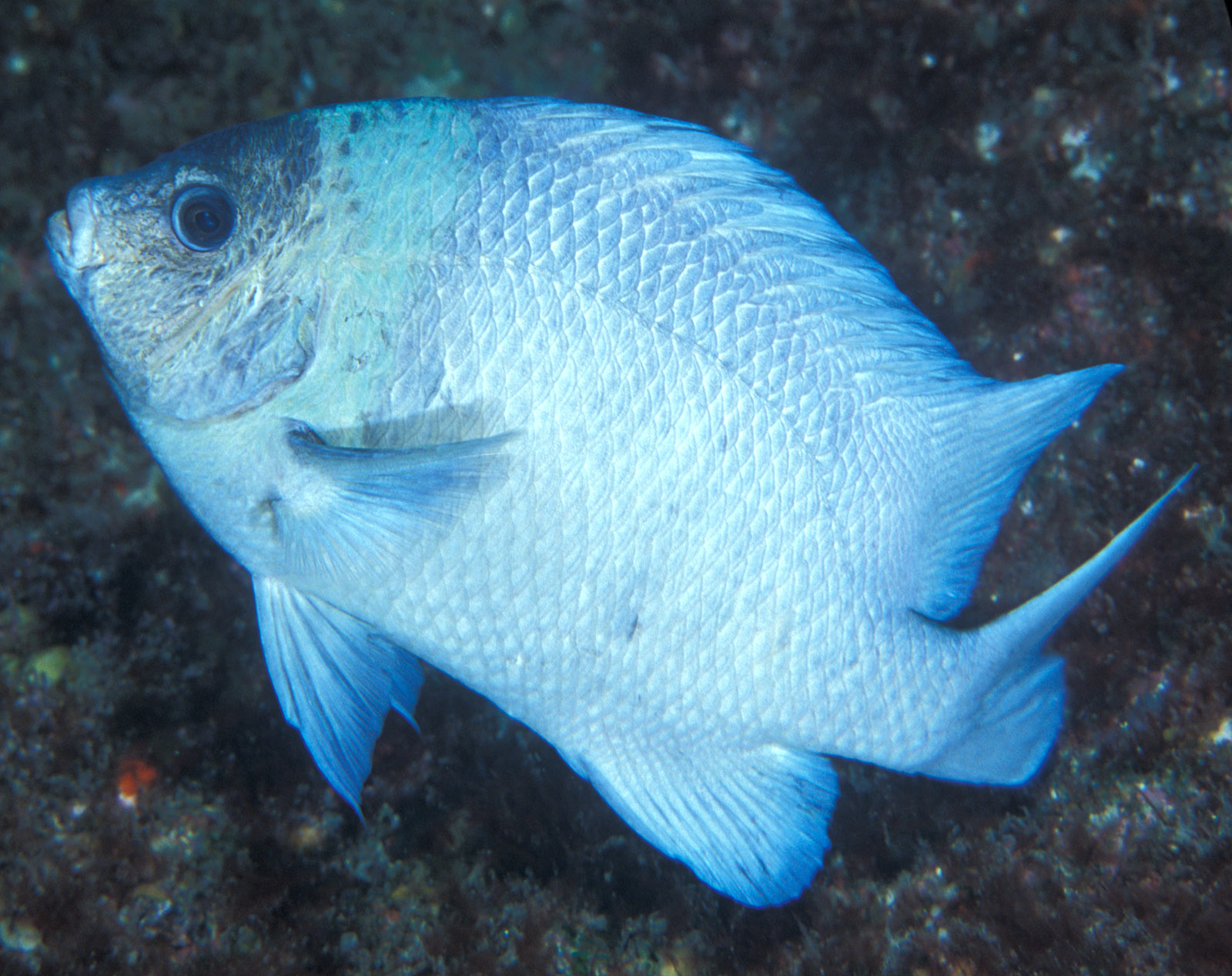
Parma kermadecensis

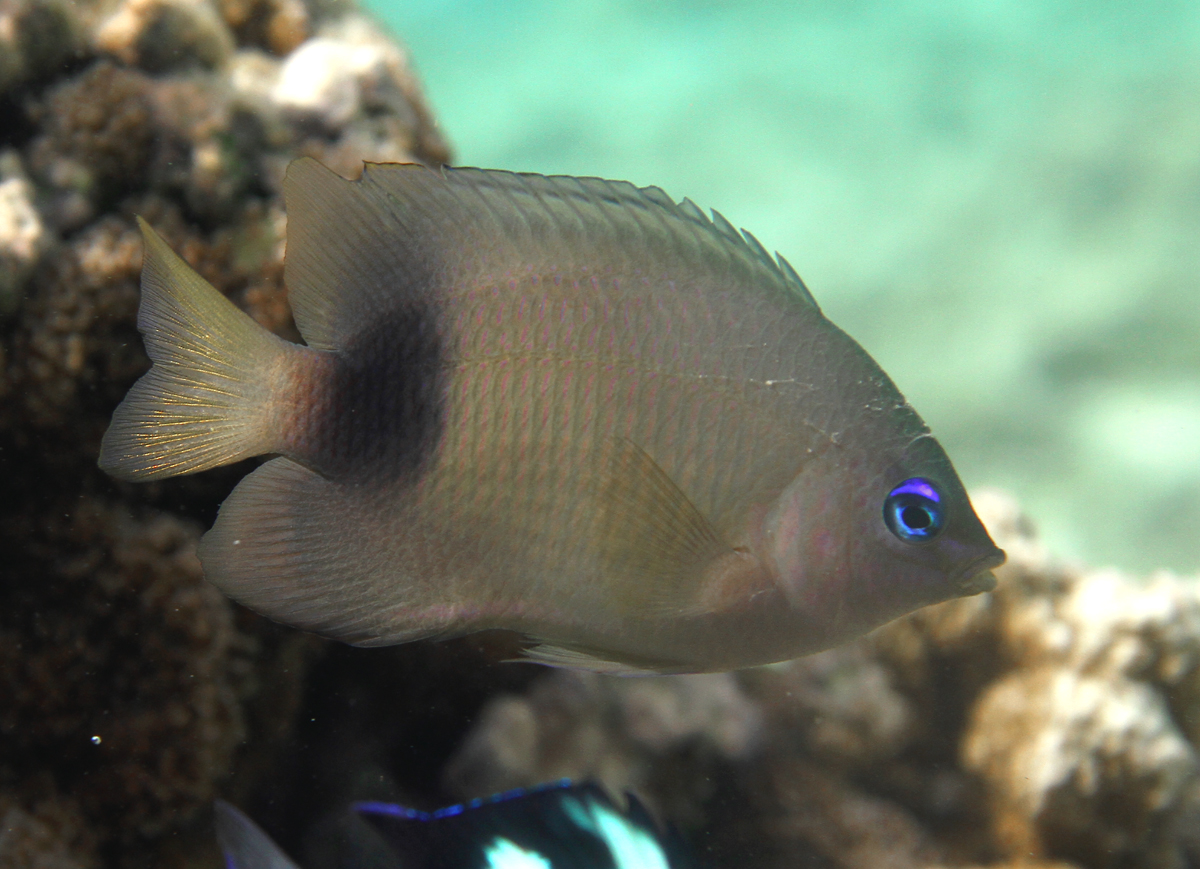
Plectroglyphidodon johnstonianus

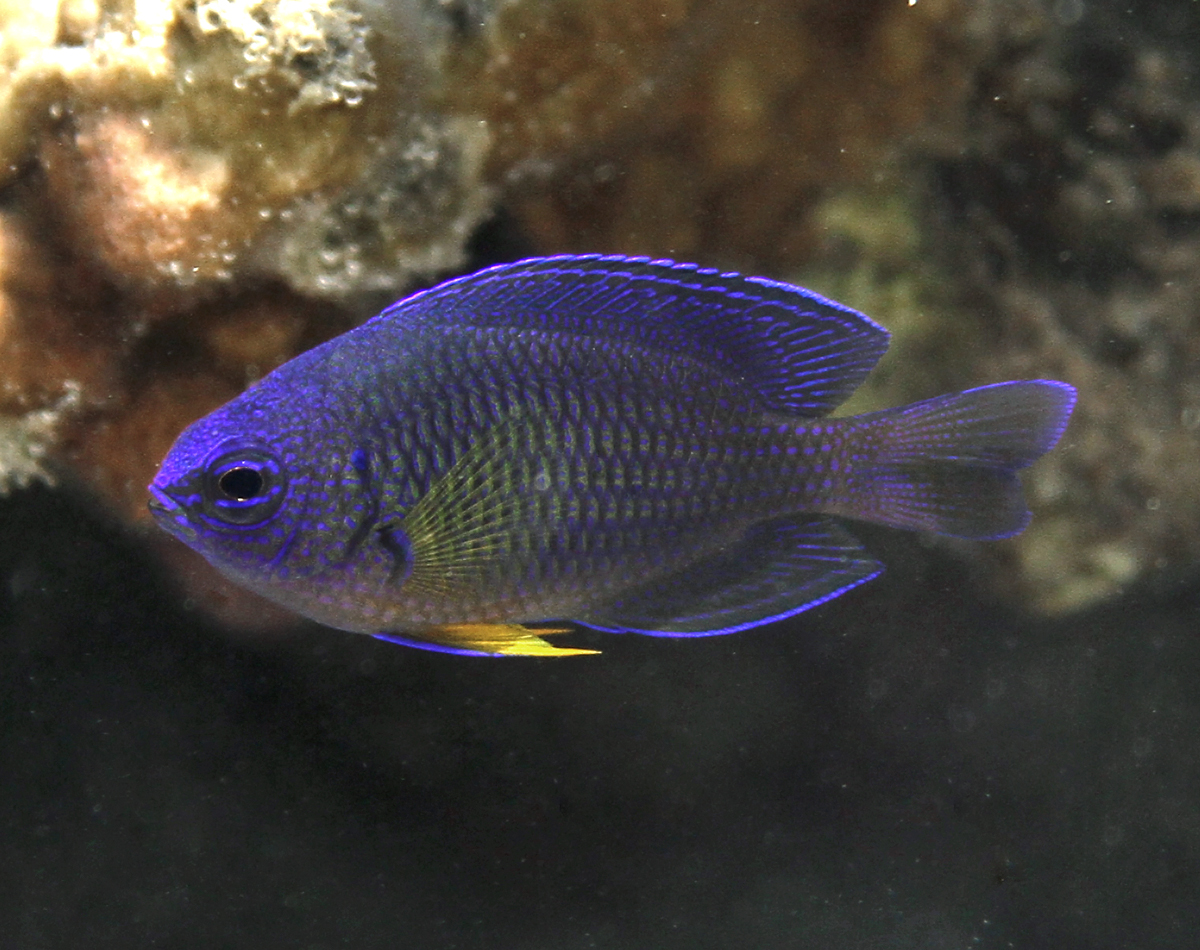
Pomacentrus caeruleus

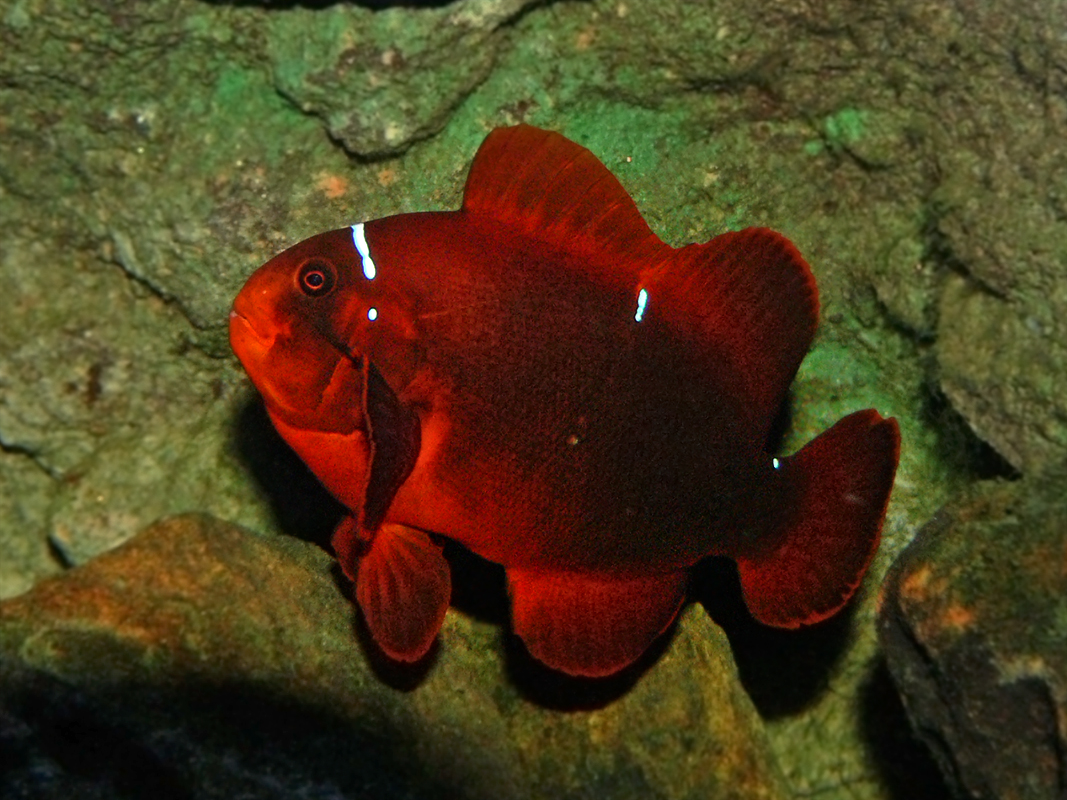
Premnas biaculeatus

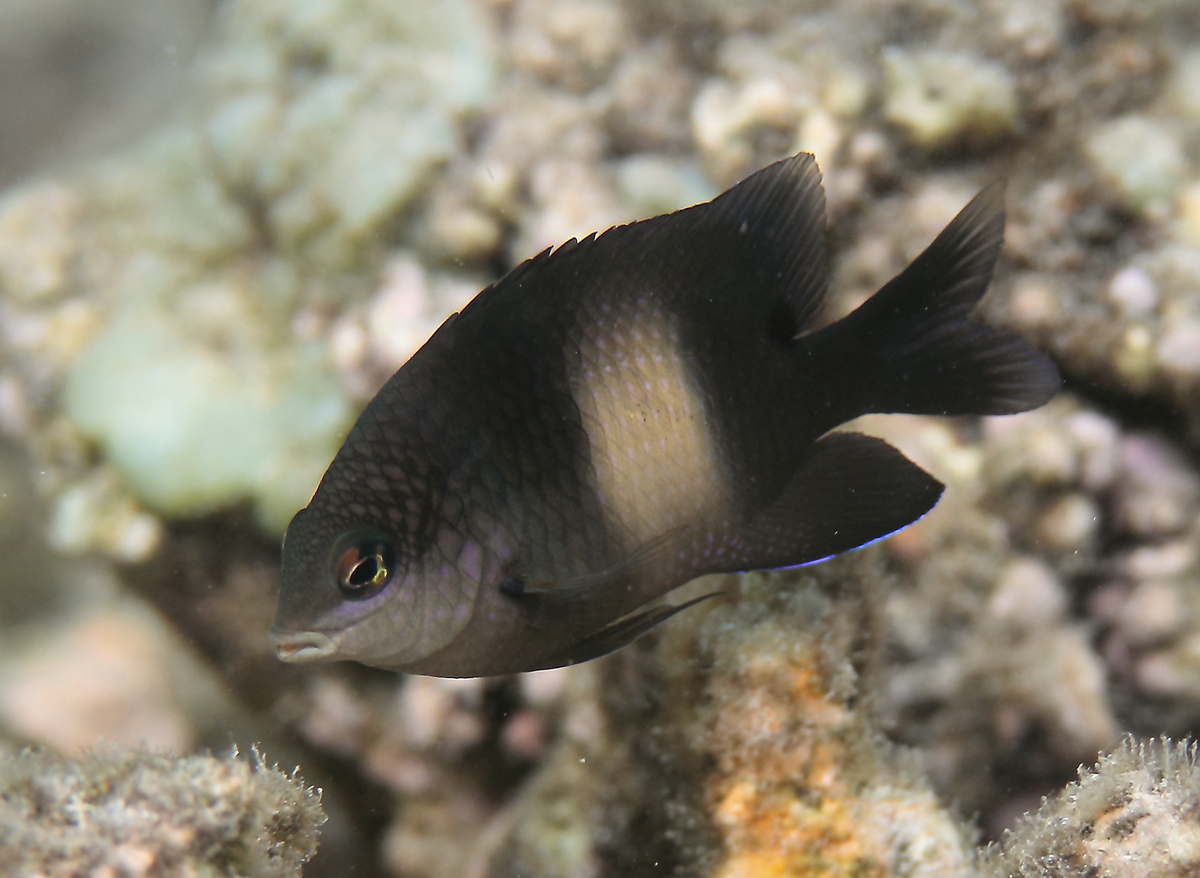
Stegastes nigricans
