= Izuus =

Izuus Temporal range: Early Miocene

Scientific classification
- Kingdom: Animalia
- Phylum: Chordata
- Class: Actinopterygii
- Division: Teleostei
- Order: Blenniiformes
- Family: Pomacentridae
- Genus: †Izuus; Saito, 1938
- Species: †I. nakamurai

Binomial name
- †Izuus nakamurai Saito, 1938

Extinct genus of fishes

Izuus is an extinct genus of prehistoric damselfish from the Miocene. It contains a single species, I. nakamurai from Early Miocene-aged rocks of Shizuoka, Japan. It is one of the few damselfishes known in the fossil record.

== See also ==
- Prehistoric fish
- List of prehistoric bony fish
