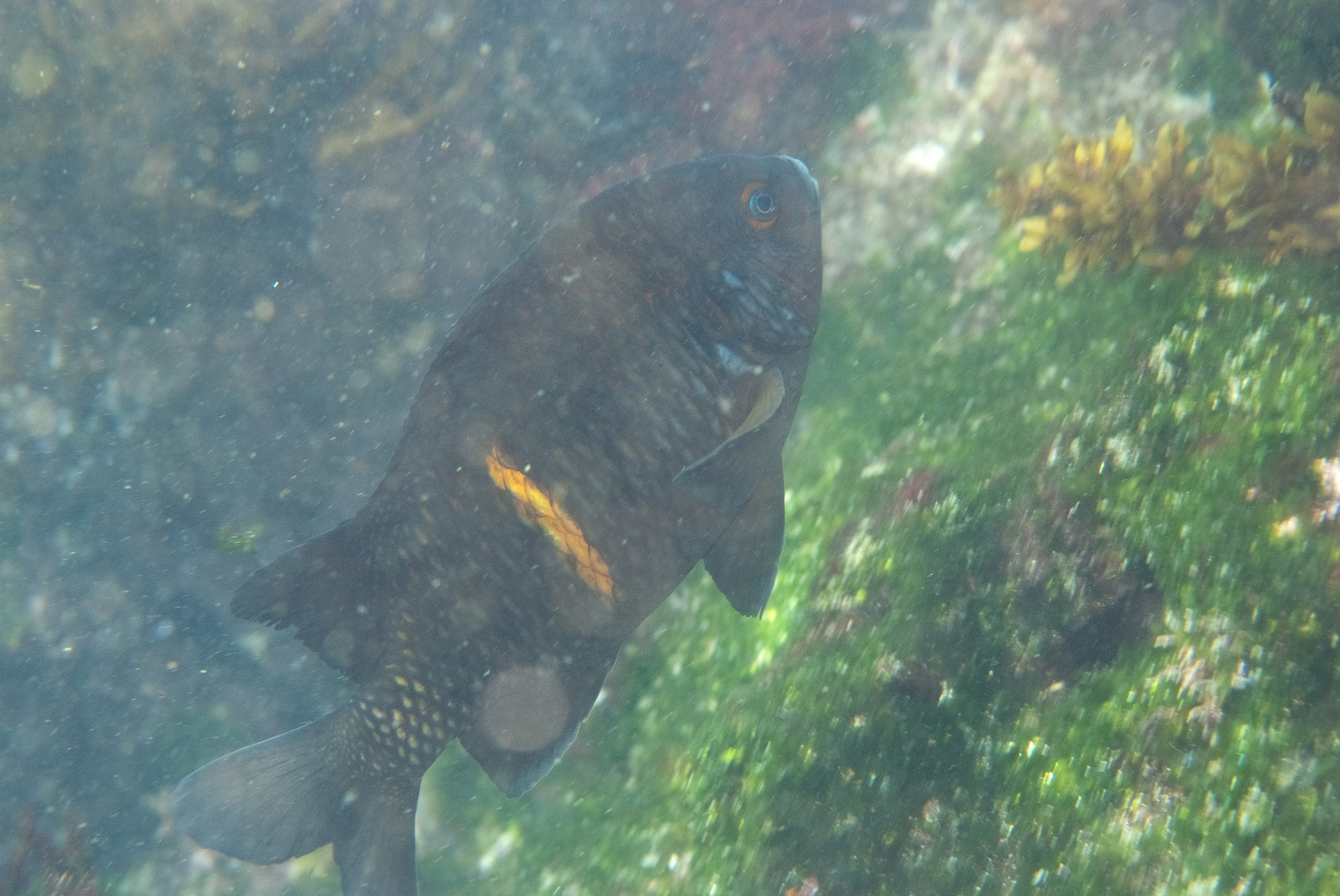

Conservation status
- Least Concern (IUCN 3.1)

Scientific classification
- Kingdom: Animalia
- Phylum: Chordata
- Class: Actinopterygii
- Order: Blenniiformes
- Family: Pomacentridae
- Subfamily: Pomacentrinae
- Genus: Nexilosus; Heller & Snodgrass, 1903
- Species: N. latifrons

Binomial name
- Nexilosus latifrons (Tschudi, 1846)

Synonyms
- Pomacentrus latifrons Tschudi, 1846; Nexilosus albemarleus Heller & Snodgrass, 1903

= Coquito sergeant =

Species of fish

The Coquito sergeant (Nexilosus latifrons), also knowns as the Coquito damsel, is a species of ray-finned fish, it is the only species in the monotypic genus Nexilosus which is classified in the family, Pomacentridae, the clownfishes and damselfishes. It is found on rocky coasts in the eastern Pacific Ocean off Peru and northern Chile, as well as the Galapagos Islands.
