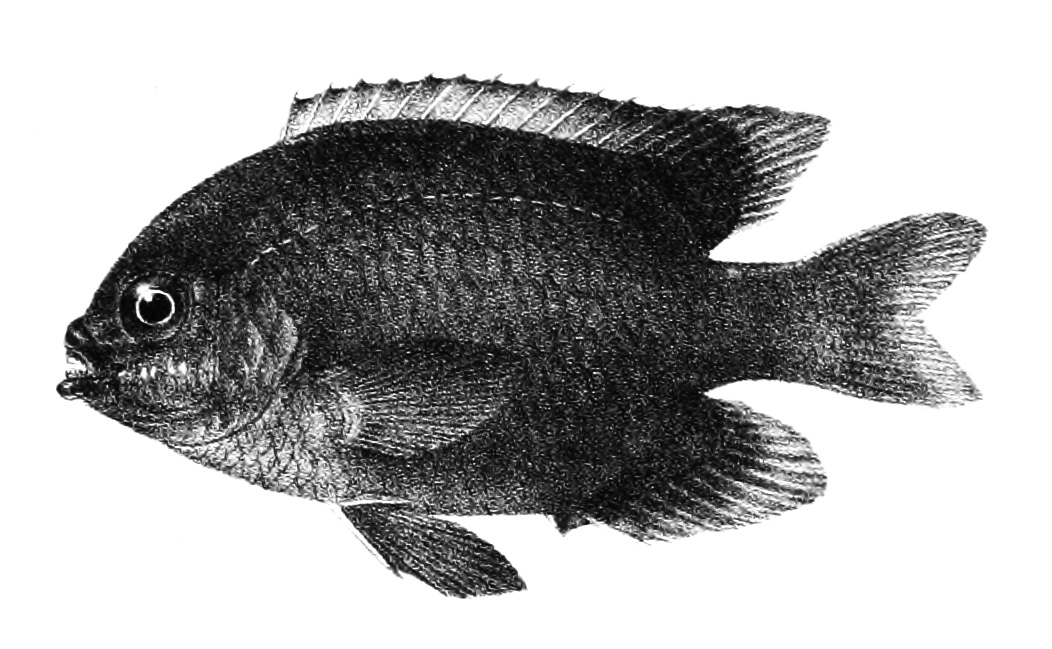

Conservation status
- Vulnerable (IUCN 3.1)

Scientific classification
- Kingdom: Animalia
- Phylum: Chordata
- Class: Actinopterygii
- Order: Blenniiformes
- Family: Pomacentridae
- Subfamily: Pomacentrinae
- Genus: Cheiloprion; M.C.W. Weber, 1913
- Species: C. labiatus

Binomial name
- Cheiloprion labiatus (Day, 1877)

Synonyms
- Pomacentrus labiatus Day, 1877

= Big-lip damselfish =

Species of fish

The big-lip damselfish is a species of ray-finned fish from the family Pomacentridae, it is the only species in the monotypic genus Cheiloprion. It occurs in the eastern Indian Ocean and south western Pacific Ocean and has been recorded from Sri Lanka east to the Solomon Islands, north to the Philippines, south to Vanuatu as well as northern Australia, from Shark Bay in Western Australia to Palm Island, Queensland. and Palau.
