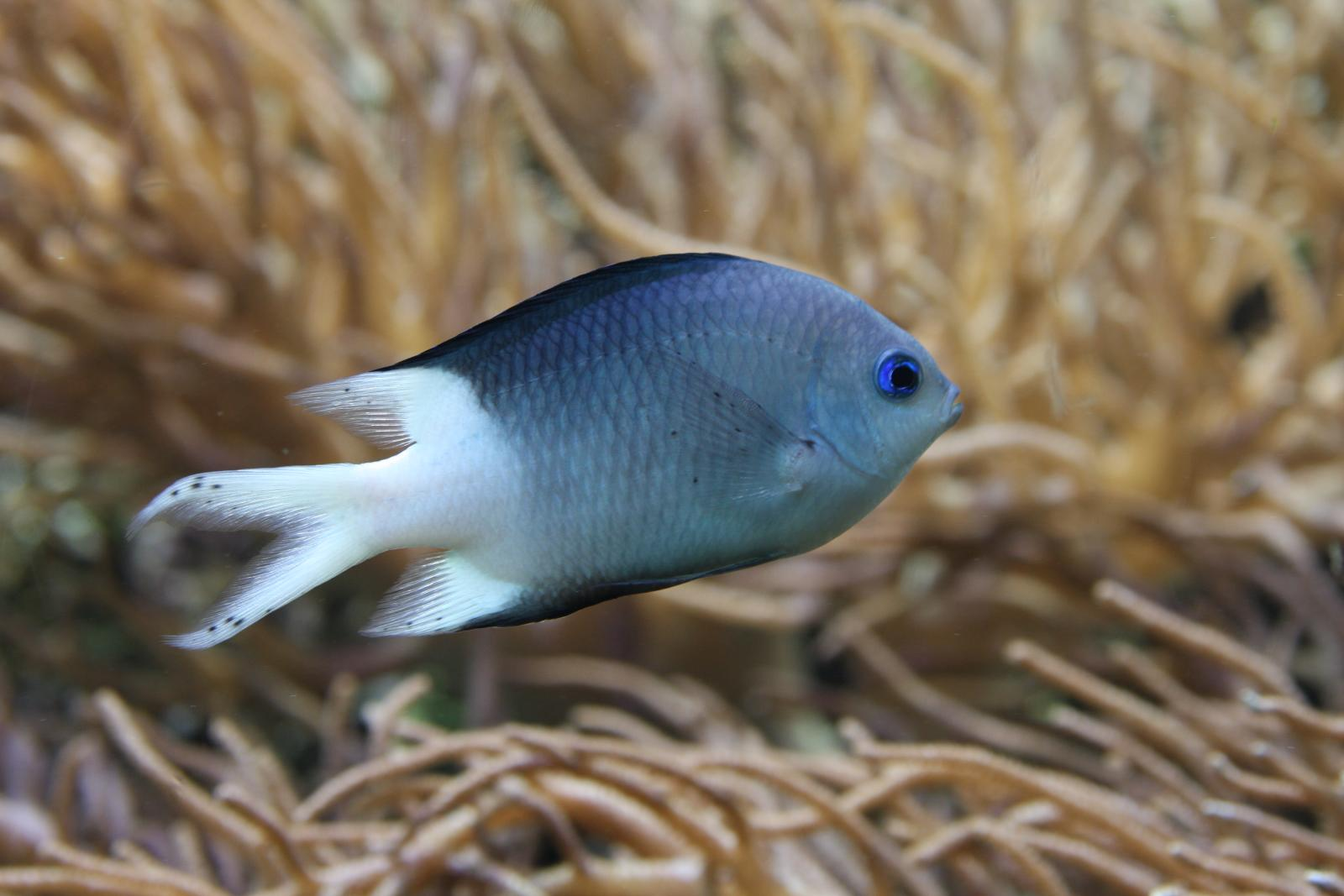

Conservation status
- Least Concern (IUCN 3.1)

Scientific classification
- Kingdom: Animalia
- Phylum: Chordata
- Class: Actinopterygii
- Division: Teleostei
- Order: Blenniiformes
- Family: Pomacentridae
- Subfamily: Pomacentrinae
- Genus: Acanthochromis; Gill, 1863
- Species: A. polyacanthus

Binomial name
- Acanthochromis polyacanthus (Bleeker, 1855)

Synonyms
- List: Dascyllus polyacanthus Bleeker, 1855; Heptadecanthus longicaudis Alleyne & Macleay, 1877; Heptadecanthus brevipinnis De Vis, 1885; Heptadecanthus maculosus De Vis, 1885; Abudefduf jordani Seale, 1906; Chromis desmostigma Fowler & Bean, 1928

= Spiny chromis =

Species of fish

The spiny chromis (Acanthochromis polyacanthus) is a species of damselfish from the western Pacific. It is the only member of the genus Acanthochromis.

== Taxonomy ==
The spiny chromis was first formally described in 1855 as Dascyllus polyacanthus by the Dutch ichthyologist Pieter Bleeker with the type locality given as Batman in the Moluccas. It is the only species in the genus Acanthochromis. The genus name is a compound of acanthus meaning "spine", probably a reference to the 17 dorsal-fin spines, and Chromis, presumably referring to a relationship to that genus. The specific name polyacanthus means "many-spined".

== Distribution and habitat ==
The spiny chromis is found in the western Pacific Ocean. It is found in western and central Indonesia, Papua New Guinea, northern Australia, and all the islands in the Philippines except Luzon. They are also found in Melanesia. This fish usually lives in coral reefs. This fish is found at a depth range of 1 to 65 metres (3.3 to 213.3 ft) but is usually found at a depth range of 4 to 20 metres (13 to 66 ft).

== Description ==
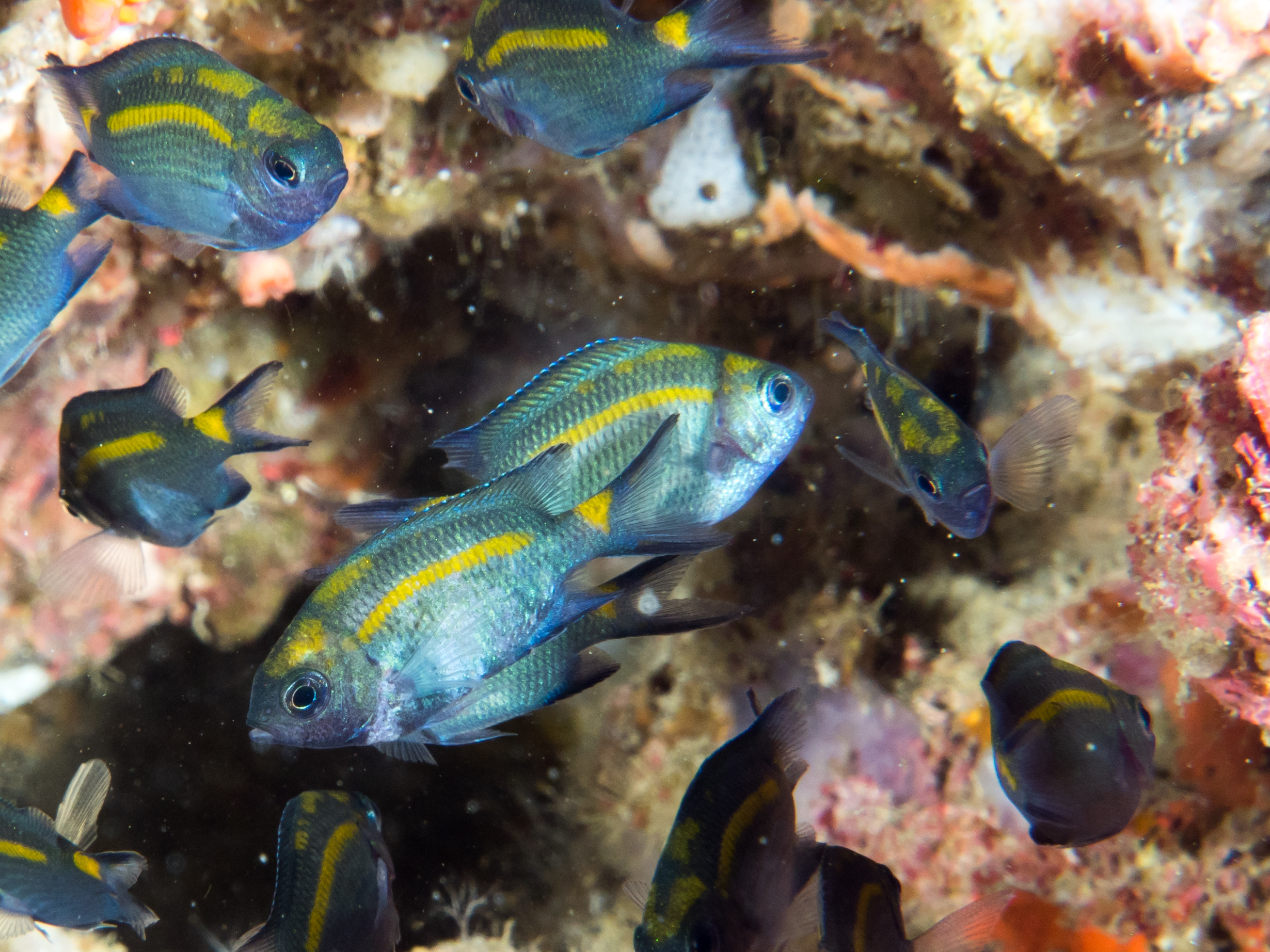
Juveniles

Spiny chromis individuals can grow up to a maximum size of 14 centimetres (5.5 in) as adults. Its fins have 17 dorsal spines, 14 to 16 dorsal rays, 2 anal spines, and 14 to 16 anal rays.

This species occurs in a wide range of colour variations, depending on geographic location. It is thought this is due to the lack of a pelagic larval phase and sedentary behaviour of adults, resulting in little genetic connectivity between populations and thus divergent evolution. It is currently unclear whether or not all these variations are truly the same species, or whether they constitute a species complex. Juveniles typically display a yellow stripe along their flanks.

== Ecology ==
=== Diet ===
This fish is planktivorous and algivorous, and steals algae from algae-farming species of damselfish. Juveniles consume mucus secreted from their parent's skin, similar to the behaviour of young discus.

== Lifecycle ==
The spiny chromis, unlike many other coral reef fishes, has direct development of their larvae, which means that the parents protect their brood from the egg stage (which are laid on the reef), through hatching and onto the fully developed juvenile stage. There is no pelagic larval stage unlike the vast majority of coral reef fishes. This form of direct development means that the offspring often take up residence on the reef not far from where they were hatched. Consequently, high levels of local adaptation to their local environment has been recorded in this species, and a number of geographic colour variations have arisen.
