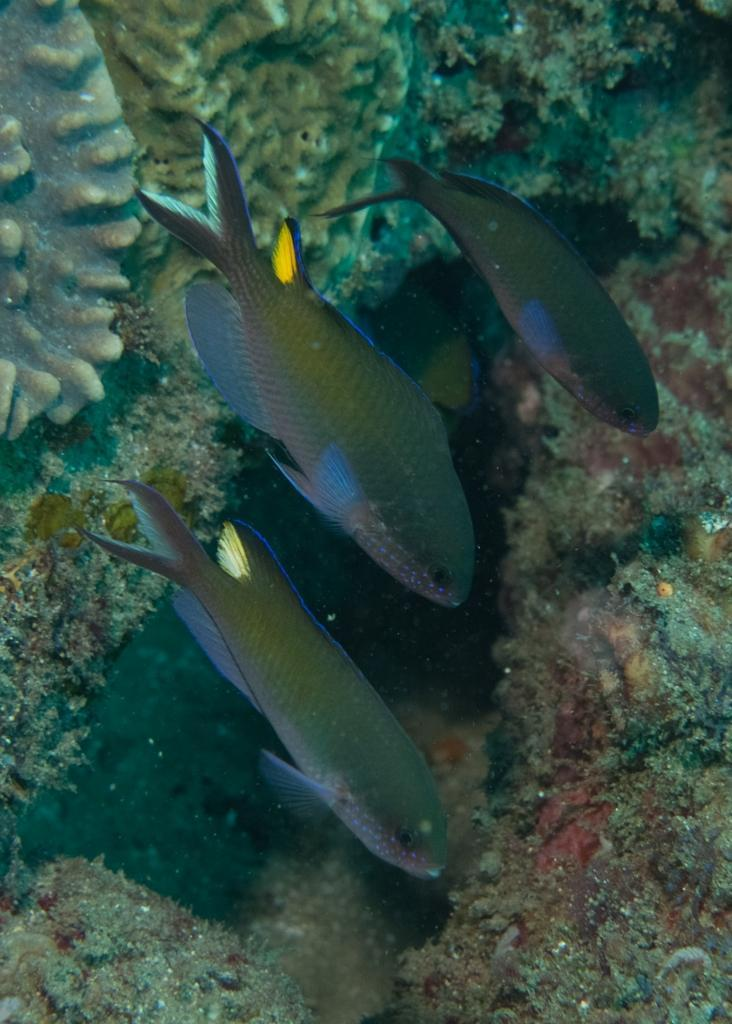

Conservation status
- Least Concern (IUCN 3.1)

Scientific classification
- Kingdom: Animalia
- Phylum: Chordata
- Class: Actinopterygii
- Division: Teleostei
- Order: Blenniiformes
- Family: Pomacentridae
- Subfamily: Lepidozyginae; Allen, 1975
- Genus: Lepidozygus; Günther, 1862
- Species: L. tapeinosoma

Binomial name
- Lepidozygus tapeinosoma (Bleeker, 1856)

Synonyms
- Pomacentrus tapeinosoma Bleeker, 1856; Lepidozygus anthioides J. L. B. Smith, 1956

= Fusilier damselfish =

Species of fish

The fusilier damselfish (Lepidozygus tapeinosoma) is a species of damselfish in the Pomacentridae family. It occurs in the Indo-Pacific. They are fond to aquarists. Adults can grow up to a maximum length of up to 10.5 centimetres (4.1 in). It is the only species in the monotypic genus, Lepidozygus which sits in its own subfamily, the Lepidozyginae.

== Distribution and habitat ==
They are found in the Indo-Pacific. Populations in the Indian Ocean are found in eastern Africa, the Gulf of Aden, Oman, India, the Maldives, Sri Lanka, the Similan Islands in the Andaman Sea, Indonesia, and Australia. In the Pacific Ocean, they are found in Cambodia, Indonesia, the Philippines, the Great Barrier Reef in Australia, Vietnam, Taiwan, various Pacific islands throughout to Hawaii, the Gulf of California south to northern Peru. It is found at depths of 1 to 30 metres (3.3 to 98.4 ft). This fish is found in coral reefs and lagoons. They live in tropical waters.

== Description ==
Adults can grow up to 10.5 centimetres (4.1 in) at maximum length. They have 12 dorsal spines, 14 to 15 dorsal soft rays, 2 anal spines, and 15 to 16 anal soft rays on their fins. Coloration of this fish can change a lot. It depends on its behavior. When it feeds, it turns silvery green. It darkens when resting. In the Maldives, adults guarding their eggs have a banded pattern.

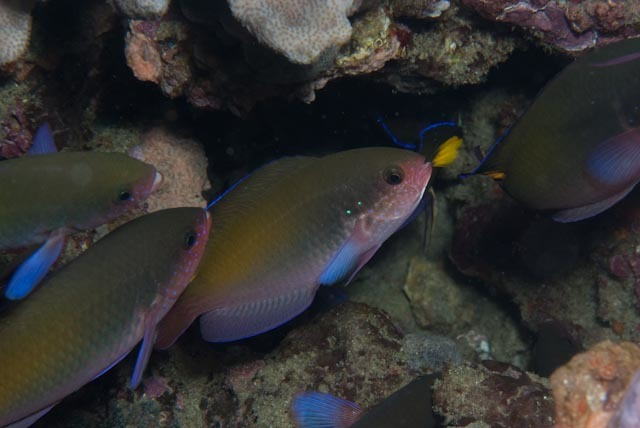
In Moazambique

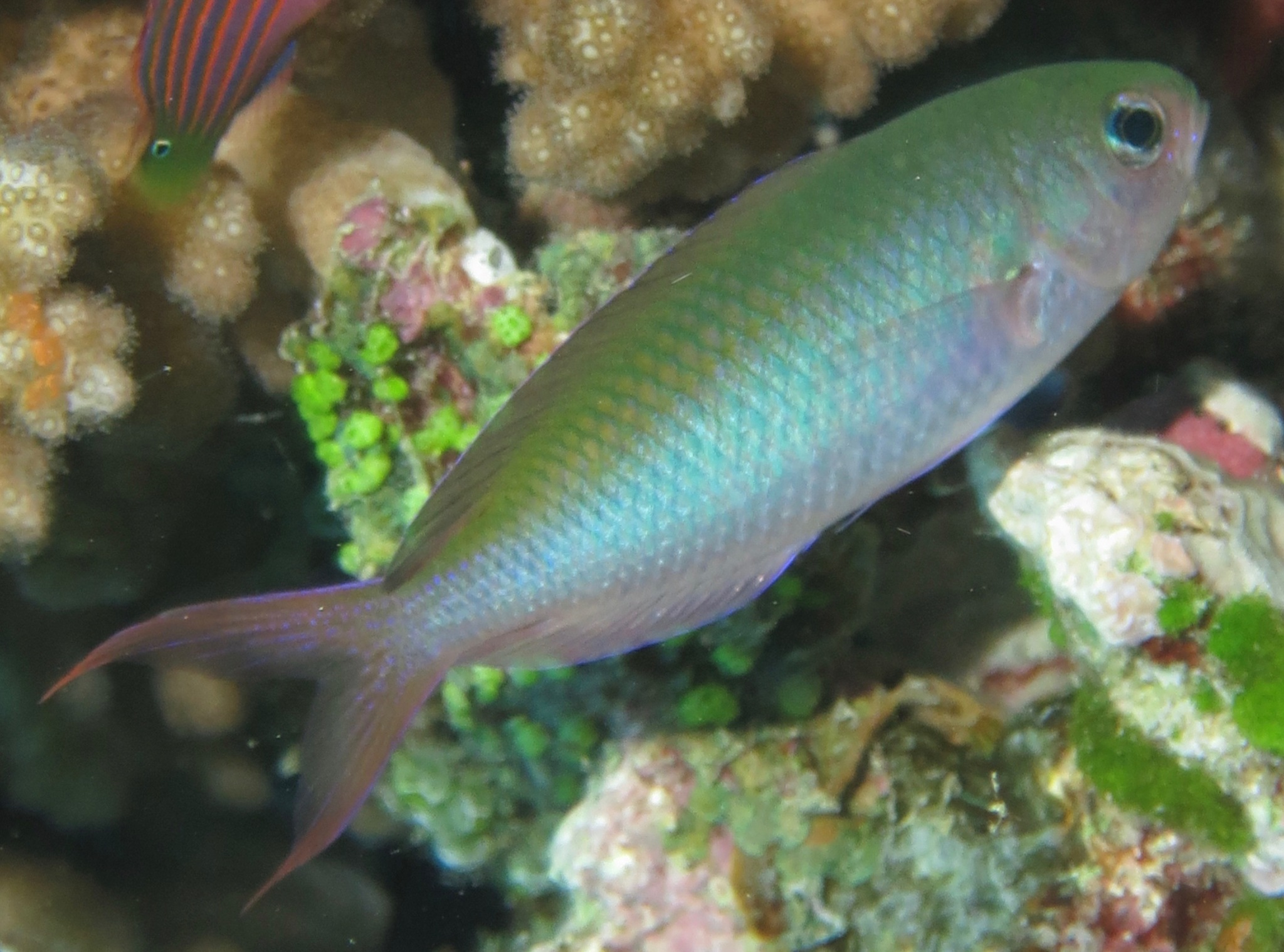
In Fiji

== Ecology ==
=== Diet ===
This fish feeds on zooplankton.

=== Behavior ===
This fish changes its color depending on what it is doing. They form aggregations.

== In the aquarium ==
This fish is not commonly kept in aquariums, but can sometimes be found. They can be kept in small groups, and they are peaceful. Behavior is similar to Anthias, but they are not as delicate. The Fusilier damselfish will turn a silver-green color when feeding and will accept meat and algae-based food, as well as flakes. Unlike many other shoaling fish, the fusilier damsels will not single out and focus aggression on the weakest individual. The Fusilier damselfish is a social animal and does best when kept with others of the same species or other peaceful fish.
