= Palaeopomacentrus =

Scientific classification
- Domain: Eukaryota
- Kingdom: Animalia
- Phylum: Chordata
- Class: Actinopterygii
- Order: Blenniiformes
- Family: Pomacentridae
- Genus: †Palaeopomacentrus
- Species: †P. orphae

Binomial name
- †Palaeopomacentrus orphae Bellwood & Sorbini, 1996

Extinct species of fish

Palaeopomacentrus orphae is an extinct species of fish from the Ypresian epoch of Monte Bolca. It is the only known species of the genus Palaeopomacentrus.
