= Garibaldi (surname) =

Origin
- Language: Lombardic
- Meaning: The surname originates in the Lombard name Garibald
- Region of origin: Kingdom of the Lombards; Italy

Other names
- Variant form: Gariboldi

Garibaldi is an Italian surname. Notable people with the surname include:

- Anita Garibaldi (1821–1849), Brazilian wife and comrade-in-arms of Giuseppe Garibaldi
- Bob Garibaldi (born 1942), American baseball player
- David Garibaldi (artist) (born 1982), American performance artist
- David Garibaldi (musician) (born 1946), American musician
- Giuseppe Garibaldi (1807–1882), revolutionary and a father of modern Italy
- Giuseppe Garibaldi (composer) (1819–1908), Italian composer and organist
- Giuseppe Garibaldi II (1879–1950), Italian soldier, grandson of Giuseppe Garibaldi
- Jabari Garibaldi, football player
- Joseph Garibaldi (1863–1941), French painter
- Navarone Garibaldi (born 1987), Los Angeles–based musician, son of Priscilla Presley
- Ricciotti Garibaldi (1847–1924), Italian soldier, son of Giuseppe and Anita Garibaldi
- Silvano Raggio Garibaldi (born 1989), Italian footballer

== Fictional characters ==
- Harry Garibaldi in Hill Street Blues
- Galleria Garibaldi in The Cheetah Girls
- Michael Garibaldi in Babylon 5
- Giacomo Garibaldi in the Expansion for Anno 1404

== See also ==
- Gariboldi
