= Garibaldo =

Garibaldo is both a surname and a given name. Notable people with the name include:

- Francesco Giustiniano di Garibaldo, 14th-century Doge of Genoa
- Vicente Garibaldo (born 1969), Panamanian baseball player
- Garibaldo Nizzola (1927–2012), Italian sport wrestler

== See also ==
- Garibaldi (surname)
