= Garibald (name) =

Garibald (also Gariwald, Garivald, Garioald, Gerbald, Gerwald, Charoald) is a Germanic masculine given name. Garibald was a popular name among the Lombards and Bavarii in the Early Middle Ages, but it is also existed as a personal name among the Anglo-Saxons (e.g. West-Saxon "Garbeald"), attested in Searle's Onomasticon Anglo-Saxonicum. Its Lombardic forms are Garipald and Gairipald; in modern Italian it is Garibaldo or Garivaldo (feminine Garibalda), and gives rise to the patronymic Garibaldi, and the adjective garibaldino ("Garibaldian", meaning daring, reckless, bold). Its roots are Proto-Germanic "gairaz", or "gaizaz" (in some West-Germanic dialects "gar" or "ger") (lance, spear) and Proto-Germanic "balthaz" (bold). Today the name is used mainly in Italy, to form an ideological connection with the Risorgimento led by Giuseppe Garibaldi.

== Kings of the Lombards ==
- Garibald

== Dukes of Trent ==
- Garibald of Trent (died 662)

== Dukes of Bavaria ==
- Garibald I of Bavaria (died 591)
- Garibald II of Bavaria (died 624/30)

== Christian martyrs ==
- Gerbald (died 862)
- Gerwald (died 782)
