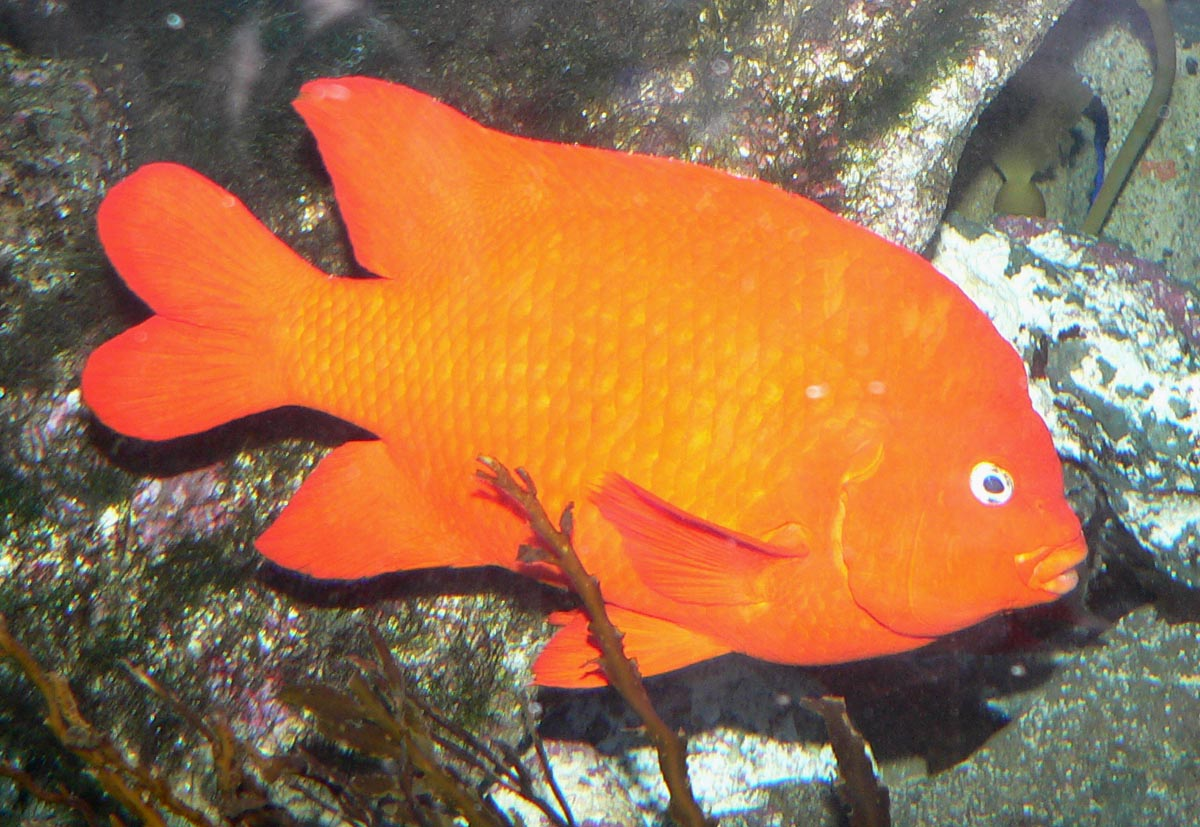
- At Birch Aquarium, La Jolla, California

Conservation status
- Least Concern (IUCN 3.1)

Scientific classification
- Kingdom: Animalia
- Phylum: Chordata
- Class: Actinopterygii
- Order: Blenniiformes
- Family: Pomacentridae
- Subfamily: Pomacentrinae
- Genus: Hypsypops; Gill, 1861
- Species: H. rubicundus

Binomial name
- Hypsypops rubicundus (Girard, 1854)

Synonyms
- Glyphisodon rubicundus Girard, 1854

= Garibaldi (fish) =

Species of fish

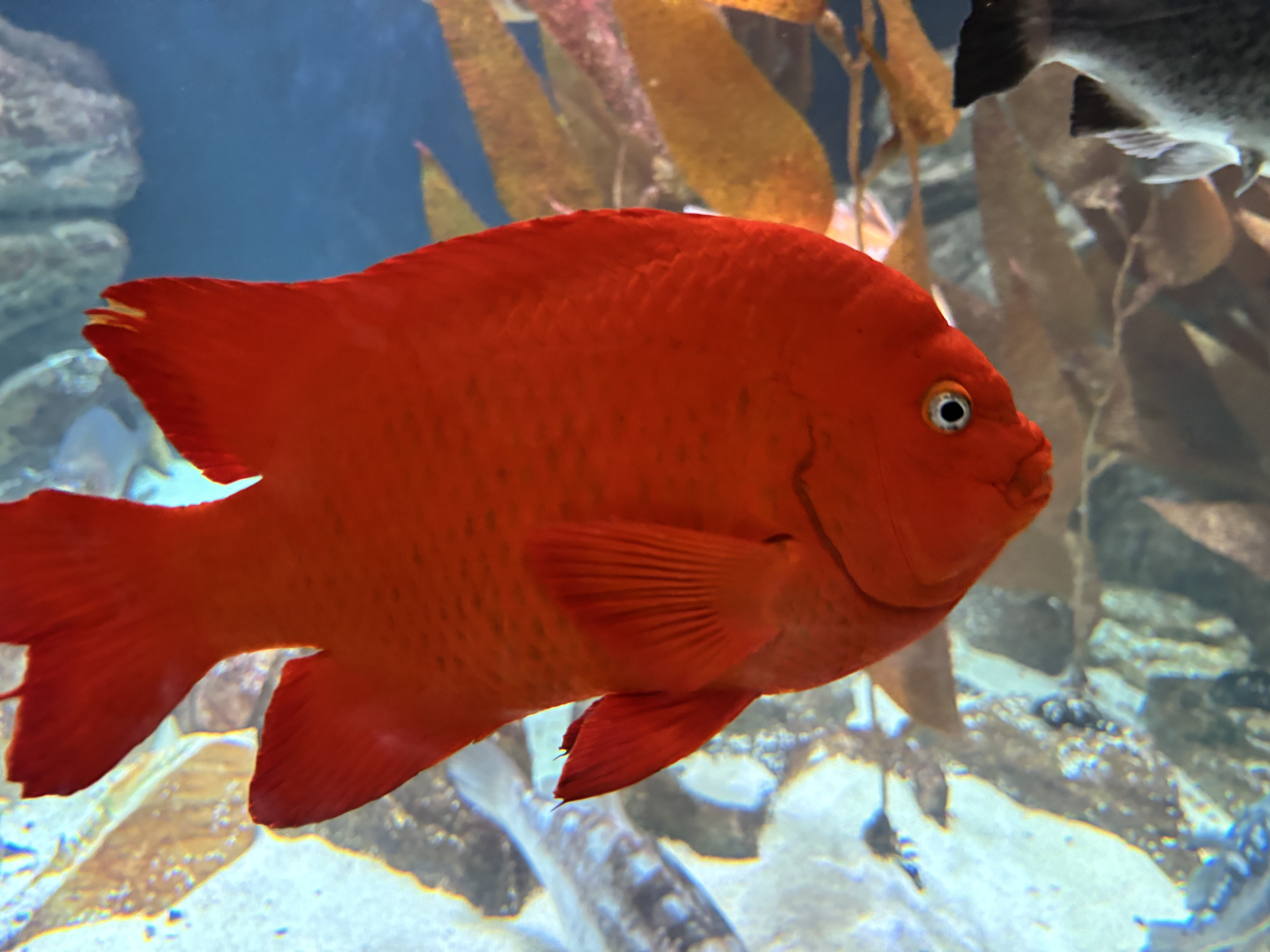
A Garibaldi in Shedd Aquarium, Chicago

The Garibaldi (Hypsypops rubicundus), known historically as the Catalina goldfish and marine goldfish and now commonly as the Garibaldi damselfish, is a species of bright orange fish in the damselfish family. It occurs in the subtropical northeastern part of the Pacific Ocean. The Garibaldi was named the official marine state fish of California in 1995, and has since been protected in California coastal waters from recreation and commercial fishing.

The English name is a reference to the 19th-century Italian general and political figure Giuseppe Garibaldi, whose followers often wore a characteristic scarlet or red shirt. Male Garibaldis aggressively defend the nest site after the female lays eggs, as is the case with other damselfish.

== Distribution and habitat ==
Garibaldis are found in marine waters up to 30 metres (98 ft) in depth. They usually nest in association with rock reefs and typically over rocky sea-bottoms. They prefer to live over rocky bottoms on exposed or semi-protected coasts with clear water and plenty of crevices as well as small caves for cover. Juveniles can be found in tide pools up to depths of 40 feet (just over 12 m). H. rubicundus is native to subtropical parts of the northeastern Pacific Ocean, ranging from Monterey Bay, California, to Guadalupe Island, Baja California.

== Description ==
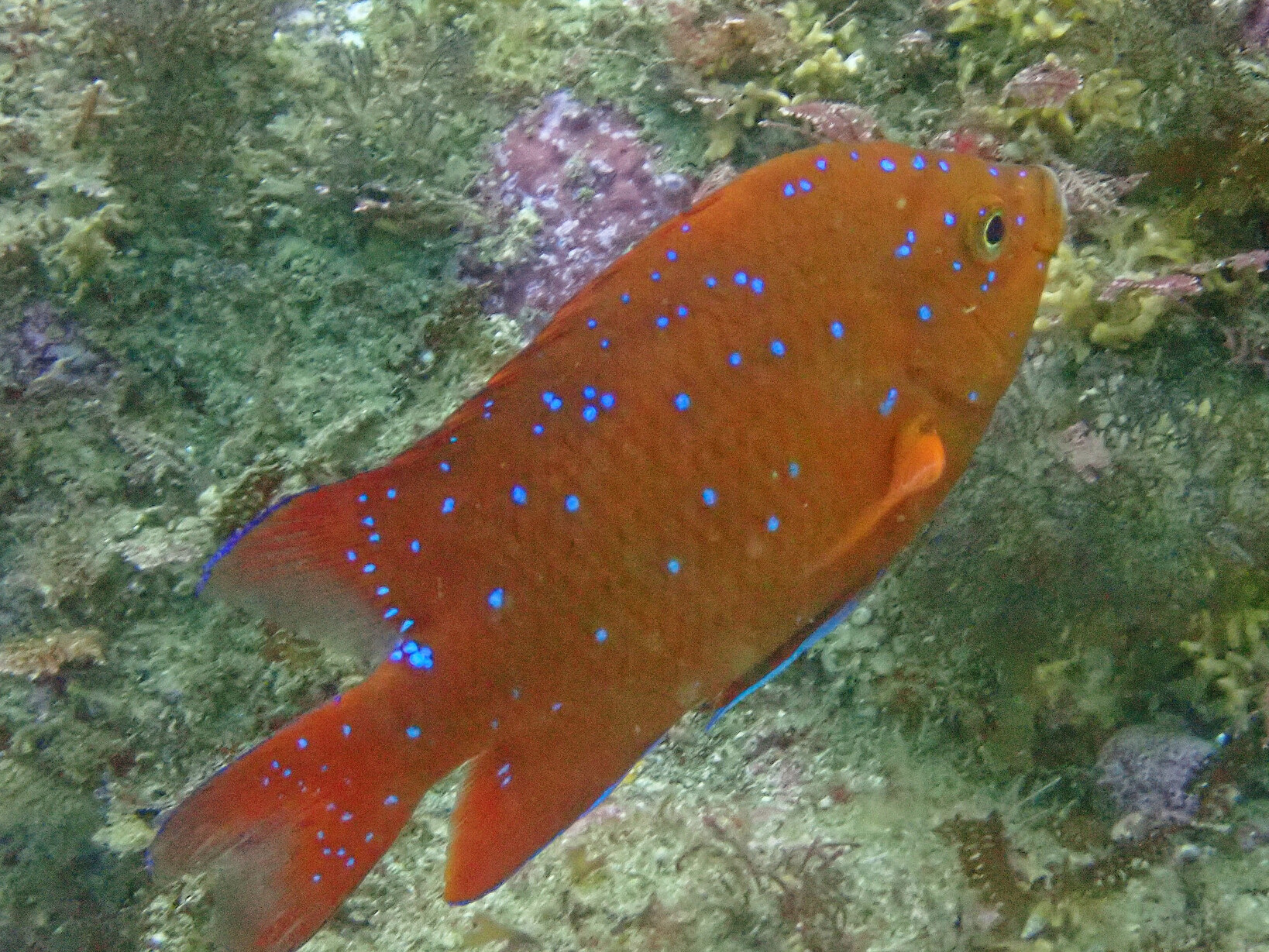
Juvenile, in California

Garibaldi are deep-bodied or laterally compressed fish, and covered in coarse scales. They have a single dorsal fin with about 12 spines and 16 rays. Adult fish of this species are uniformly bright orange in color. It is the largest member of the damselfish family growing up to 35.6 cm (14 inches) in length. Among Garibaldi there is a sexual size dimorphism, with average adult males measuring 25 mm (1 inch) larger than females, — an unusual trait for damselfish species and other marine fish in southern California, where typically adult females are larger.

Juveniles are a deeper, more reddish shade of orange than adults. They are covered in many small iridescent blue stripes and spots, which they gradually lose as they become adults. Their tail (caudal fin) and dorsal fins are more translucent compared to their adult counterparts.

=== Role of coloration difference ===
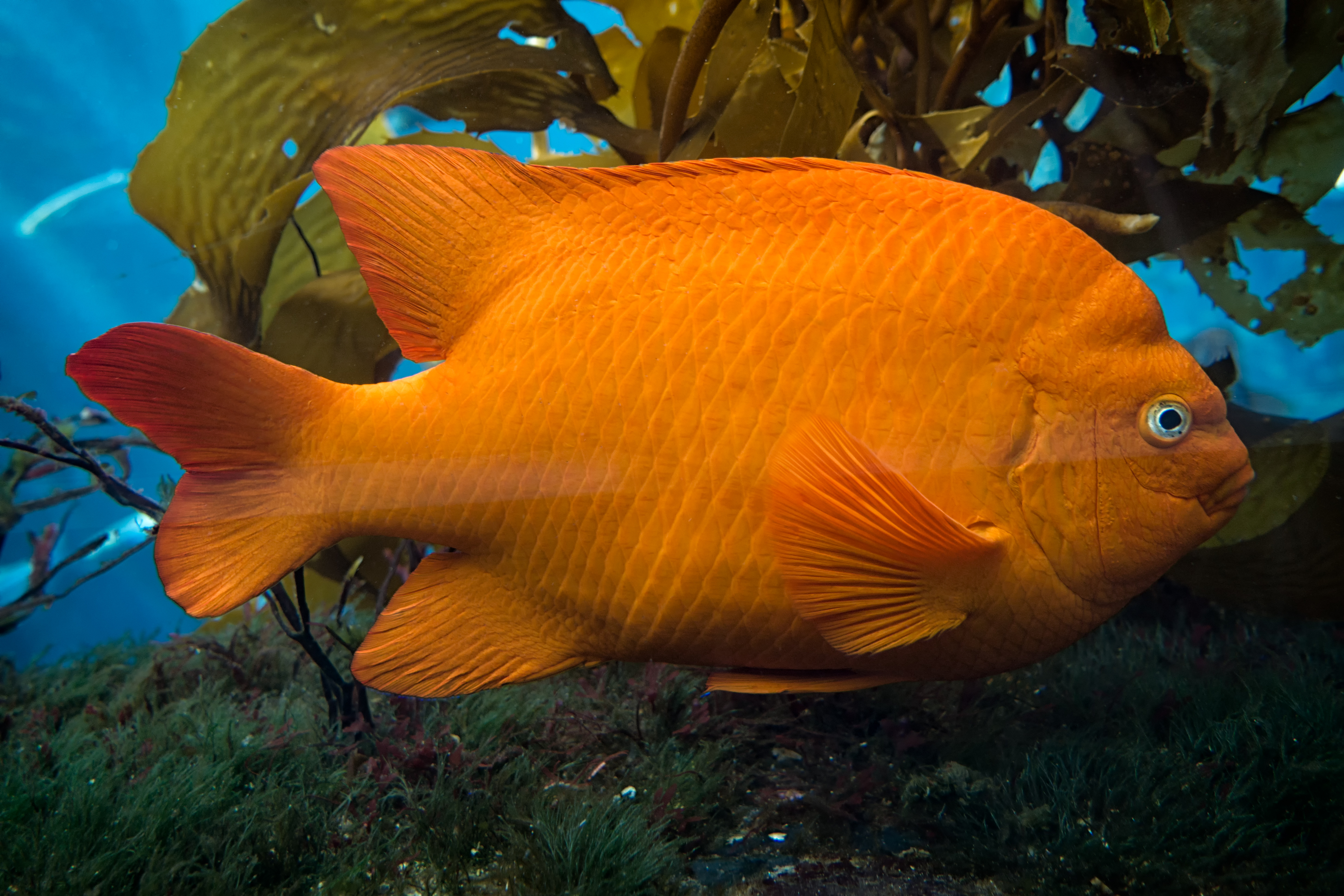
Adult, at the Monterey Bay Aquarium

A study conducted by Caron & Rainboth in 1992 found that vibrant colorations reduce aggressive behavior that territorial fish express toward members of their own species, especially during the breeding season. They tested orange and patterned orange (in addition to non-orange) as stimuli for territorial behavior in Garibaldi. The study found that orange was a very successful stimulus, and that adding disruptive patterns to the color orange counteracted or nullified the effect of pure orange. These findings support the "intraspecific camouflage" theory, or the idea that the distinct coloration of juvenile Garibaldi allows them to go unrecognized as competitors by the adults. However, Caron & Rainboth only tested the effect of color by using blocks of color. in this study, it was not clear if the results would be the same with live fish.

A separate study by Thomas J. Neal expanded on this study. He conducted preliminary experiments in which adult Garibaldi were exposed to live fish with various colorations. The result was that normal-colored juveniles were attacked more (not less, as might be expectes with intraspecific camouflage) than the adult-colored juveniles.

A hypothesis known as "adult-habituation" could provide an alternate, theoretical basis for Garibaldi juveniles being more brightly colored than adults. This hypothesis proposes that the vibrant colors of the juveniles help adults get used to their presence more quickly, particularly when juveniles begin remaining within adult territories and use shelter holes too small for the adults to follow. The idea is that juvenile coloration works similarly to the bright coloration of poisonous organisms. Rather than facilitating the recognition of a deadly prey, juvenile coloration accelerated Garibaldi adults' learning to avoid wasting time and energy chasing after juvenile fish, allowing juveniles to gradually increase the amount of time they could spend foraging within the adults' territory.

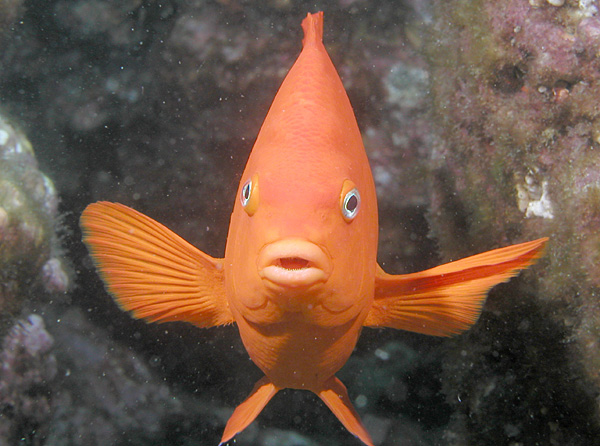

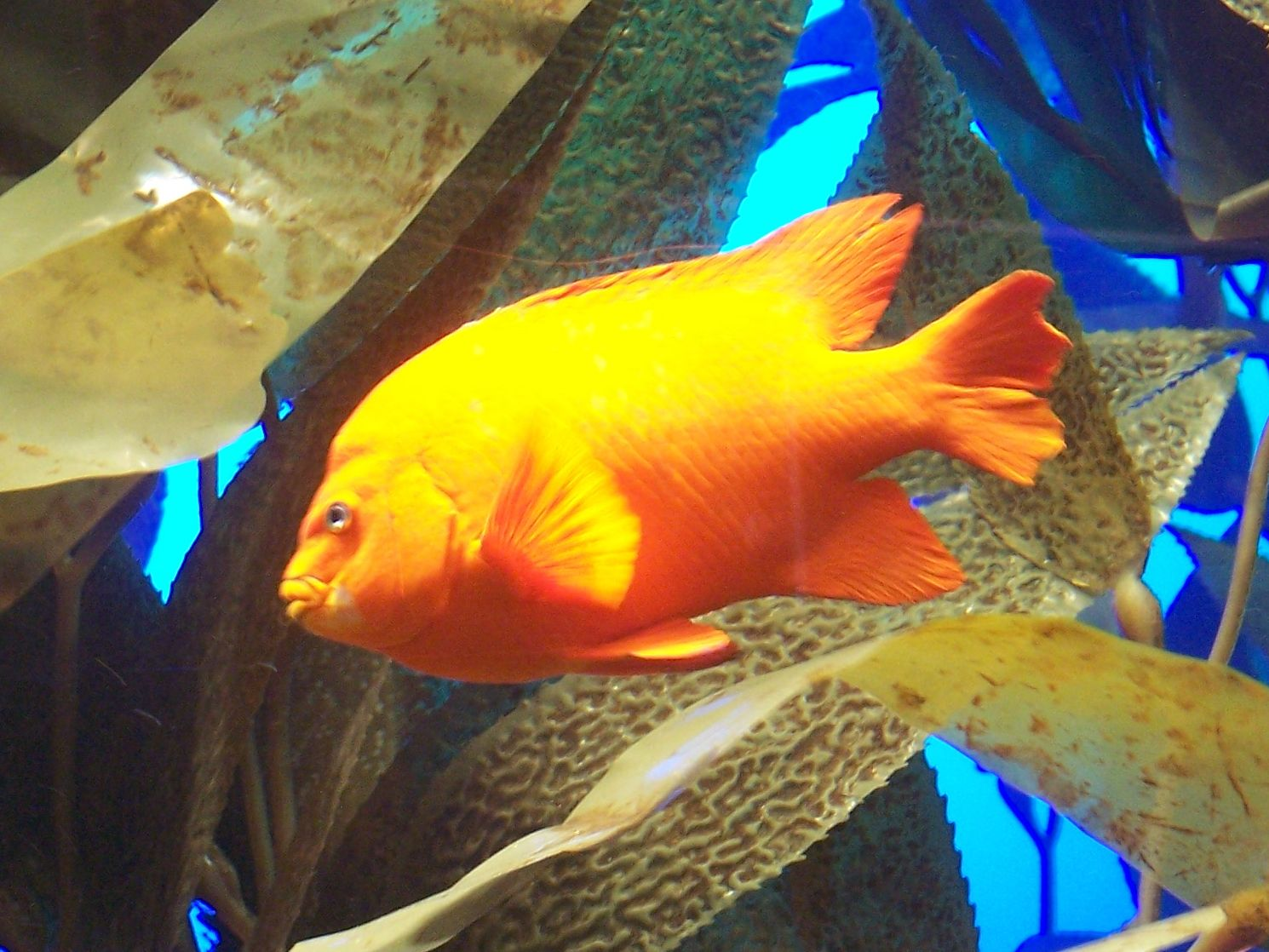

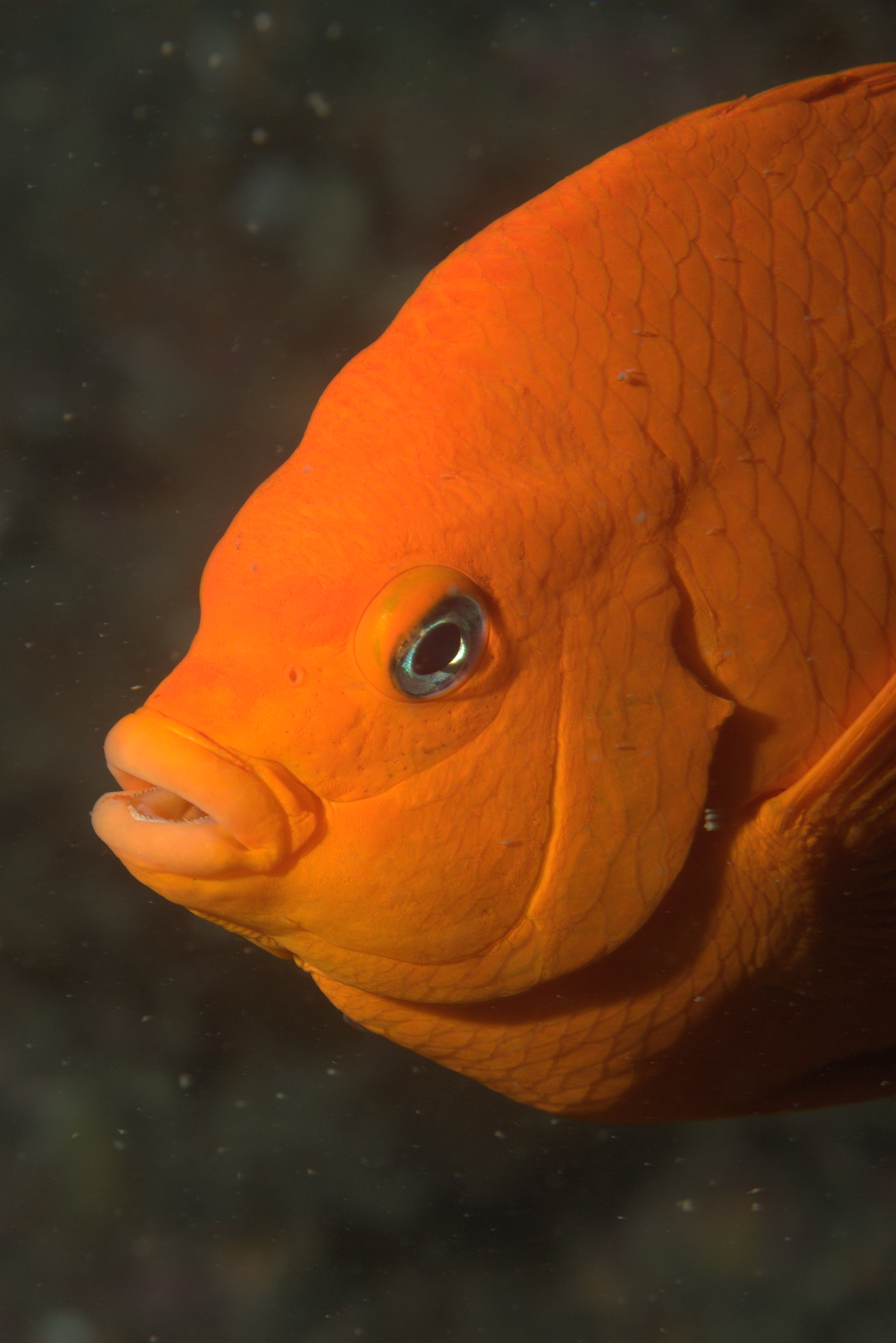

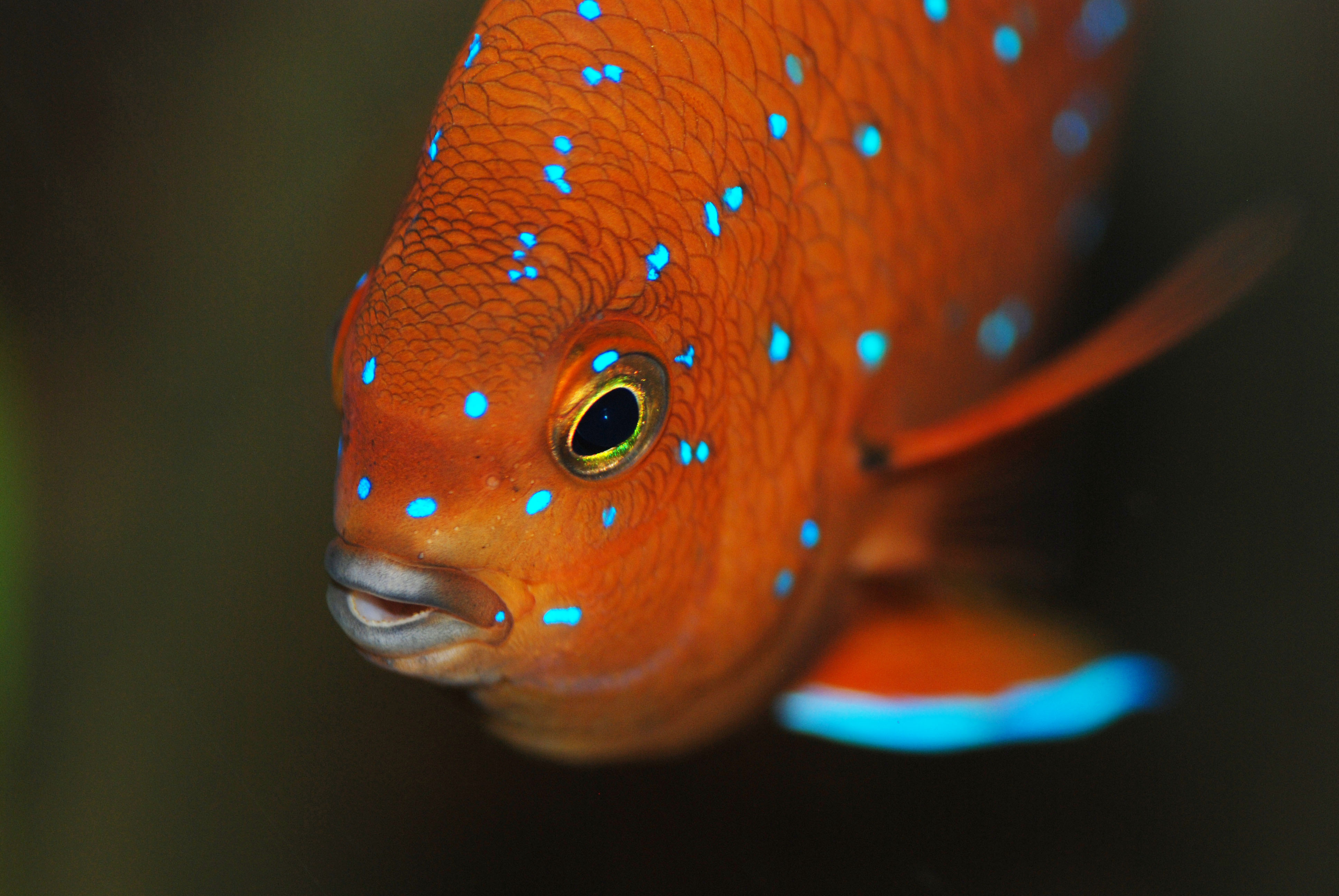

== Biology ==
=== Life history ===
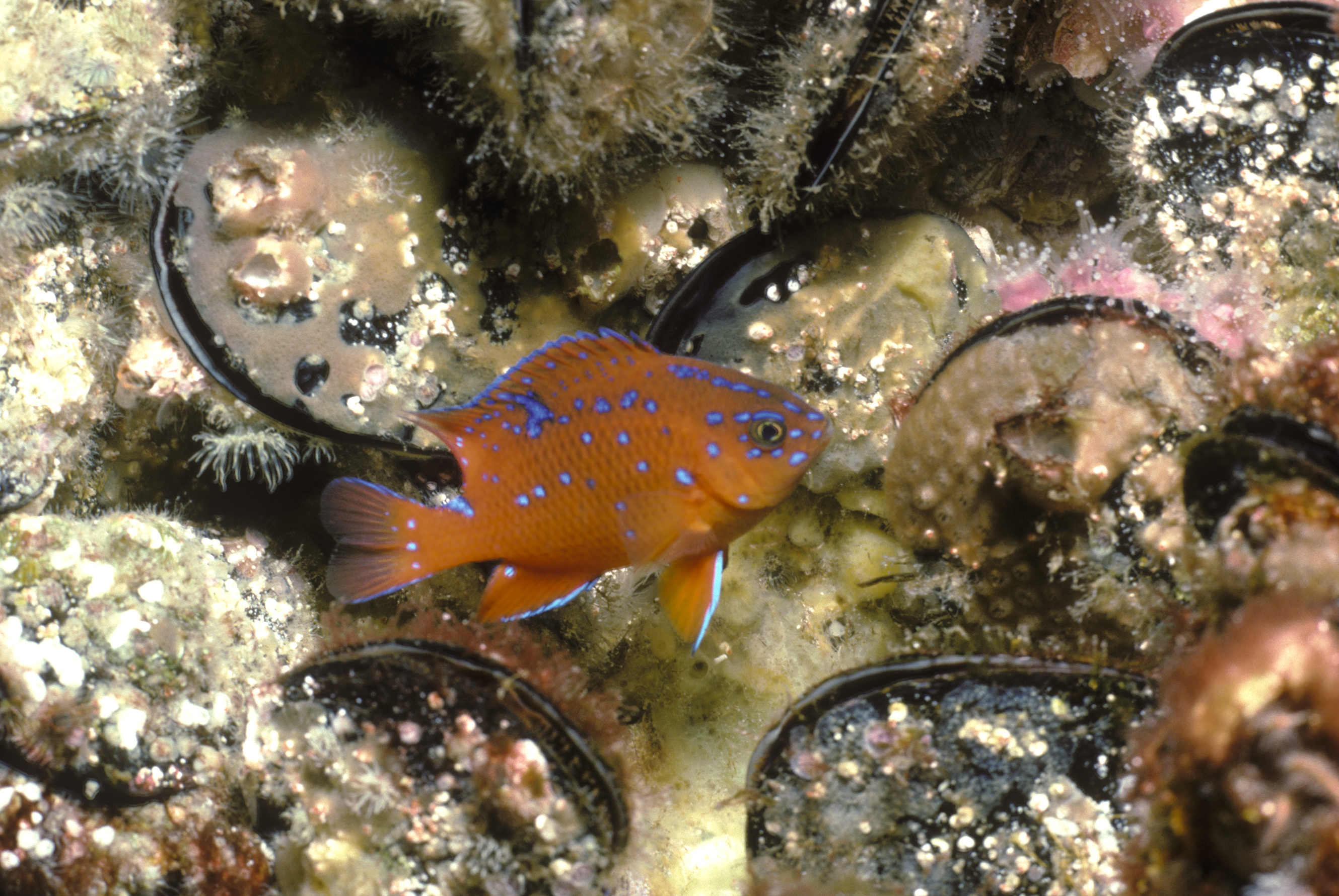
Juvenile

The breeding season for Garibaldi may begin as early as March and continue through July. During this time, the male clears a sheltered nest site within his territory, and then the female deposits eggs in the nest. When first deposited, the elliptical eggs are bright yellow and turn gray after approximately 5 days. After fertilizing the eggs, the male guards the nest area until the eggs hatch, which takes 19–21 days. Garibaldi have diel patterns of egg-hatching, meaning that spawning occurs at regular intervals within a day (24 hours), every day during the spawning season. Embryos hatch within 2 hours after sunset and before early morning, potentially to minimize risk of predation by planktivorous reef fishes. The embryos hatch and disperse as planktonic larvae, eventually reaching the first juvenile stage with a striped blue head and iridescent blue markings over an otherwise translucent orange body. In their juvenile stage, Garibaldi will inhabit tiny crevices, or shelter holes, in their habitat. As they grow older, their orange color deepens, and they gradually lose their blue markings. Garibaldi will typically achieve adult coloration at around 5 years and reach sexual maturity at 6 years. The average lifespan is believed to be around 12 years, and for the longest time the maximum age for an individual was thought to be 17 years. A newer study, conducted by Williams et al., 2022, collected a Garibaldi with the age of 57 years, making it the longest lived of any species of damselfish by two decades.

=== Diet ===
Classified as generalist omnivores, Garibaldi feed mainly on invertebrates, which they remove from the rocks. Their diet also includes a variety of algae and occasionally their own eggs. Garibaldi are found to most commonly feed upon fleshy red algae, polychaete worms, anemones, and sponge fragments. But they have also been found to eat encrusting bryozoans, hydroids, branching bryozoans, mollusks, and brown algae.

=== Predators ===
Adult Garibaldi have very few known natural predators and are protected by law against fishing, although kelp bass (Paralabrax clathratus) have been reported to prey on the on young-of-the-year Garibaldi.

=== Parasites and cleaning symbiosis ===
Senoritas (Oxyjulis californica) and Kelp Perch (Brachyistius frenatus) remove external parasitic organisms, like bacteria, fungi, copepods, and isopods, from Garibaldis. As is the case with other parasitized fish species, Garibaldi will seek out cleaner fish to remove particular parasites. It has been observed that Garibaldi will often hold their operculum open so that a Senorita can remove gill parasites. The red and white shrimp (Hippolysmata californica) has also been observed removing parasites from Garibaldi.

== Behavior ==
=== Territoriality ===
Unlike other damselfish where males guard nest sites only during the mating season, both male and female adult Garibaldi tend to defend year-round territories of about 3-10 square meters, demonstrating a strong attachment to their specific locations. Males are more strict with defense, especially during the breeding season. During the time period that the eggs are developing, the male Garibaldi aggressively tries to keep all other fish away from the eggs, and will boldly attack much larger swimming creatures, including humans, to the point of biting divers in order to try to drive them away from the area where the eggs are deposited. Garibaldi territories include a shelter hole, foraging area, and for adult males, a nest site consisting of perennial patches of red algae cultivated by the male. These territories often share borders, but boundaries are maintained with a little intraspecific aggression but mostly aggression towards other species. Juvenile Garibaldi don't tend to be territorial or aggressive toward each other unless they are confined in an aquarium.

=== Female spawning-site selection ===
Females will travel considerable distances during breeding season, encountering courting males and don't just spawn automatically with the mate nearest to her territory. She has standards, favoring nests that already contain eggs. Females will selectively spawn with males whose nests contain eggs that are less than three days old, over males with empty nests or those guarding mostly older eggs. They will also always lay their eggs adjacent to younger eggs. Depositing eggs among other females would confer the advantage of reduced risk of predation per egg through the diluting effect (there is a per capita reduction in predation risk when spawning in nests with eggs).

When choosing empty nests, female Garibaldi base their decision on algal growth. They prefer nests with the greatest amount of dense turf algae with short or medium growth. As this may be a reflection of the amount of energy a male devotes to nest tending, serving as an indicator of ability to invest in paternal care and/or parental experience.

=== Filial Cannibalism ===
Filial cannibalism is when parents consume their own offspring, in this case their eggs. This is a widespread behavior among teleost fish. Male filial cannibalism during the mating phase is believed to be an adaptive response to female spawning-site preference. Since females only lay eggs next to the youngest eggs, if there are older eggs in the front of the nest they can limit the number of additional eggs the male can receive. One way the male can maintain this age gradient the females look for is by selectively cannibalizing the older eggs that are exposed to empty nest space.

== Conservation status ==
The IUCN Red List of Threatened Species lists Garibaldi as Least Concern. Due in part to the species being widespread in the Eastern Pacific, common in many parts of its range with no major threats, and no current indication of population decline.

A brand new study Fuentes Calderon et al., 2024, has data that shows correlated patterns between sea surface temperature across islands and the relationship between diet composition and habitat type. It is hard to find direct evidence of habitat-related differences in the ecological performance of marine fishes, but this knowledge can be critically important in the future design and assessment of projects that may add or remove reef habitats in the ocean.

== In aquarium ==
It is peaceful during the juvenile period. But as long as the body is slightly larger, it will show territorial rights to other meek fish and compete with other small fish for territory.
