= Gariboldi =

Gariboldi is an Italian surname. Notable people with the surname include:

- Gaetano Gariboldi (1815–1857), Italian painter
- Giuseppe Gariboldi (1833–1905), Italian classical flautist and composer
- Italo Gariboldi (1879–1970), Italian general
- Luciano Gariboldi (1927–1988), Italian footballer

== See also ==
- Garibaldi (disambiguation)
