= Porta Garibaldi =

Porta Garibaldi could refer to:

- Porta Garibaldi (Milan city gate), a gate in Milan, Northern Italy
- Porta Garibaldi (Milan), the surrounding district named after the gate
- Milano Porta Garibaldi railway station, a major railway station located to the north of the gate
- Garibaldi FS (Milan Metro), a metro station named after the railway station
