= Giuseppe Garibaldi (composer) =

Italian composer and organist

- Born: 1819; Cipressa, Liguria, Italy
- Died: May 25, 1908 (aged 89); Cipressa, Liguria, Italy
- Occupations: Composer, organist, pianist
- Era: Romantic
- Notable work: Versetti for organ
- Relatives: Giovanni Battista Garibaldi (son)

Giuseppe Garibaldi (1819 – 25 May 1908) was an Italian composer and organist. He was born and died in the small Ligurian coastal town of Cipressa, near Imperia.

== Musical career ==
A well-off landowner, he was also an organist and pianist. On Sundays he used to play organ and conduct small choirs in two neighbouring churches, before going on to play dance music in marriages and balls later in the day. His son, Giovanni Battista Garibaldi (1862–1938), succeeded him as organist at Cipressa.

Garibaldi's set of seventeen Versetti for organ was uncovered and published in 2004 by Michelle Bernard in the academic journal Organi Liguri. The Versetti were recorded by Silvano Rodi in 2011.
