= Beniamino Giribaldi =

Italian organ builder (1942–2021)

- Born: 10 January 1942; Imperia, Italy
- Died: 27 August 2021 (aged 79); Imperia, Italy
- Occupation: Organ builder

Beniamino Giribaldi (10 January 1942 – 27 August 2021) was an Italian organ builder.

== Biography ==
Giribaldi began studying organ building with Celestino Gandolfo. He then worked in the shop of Barthélemy Formentelli, from whom he learned methods of restoring ancient organs. Throughout his career, Giribaldi specialized in building Tuscan organs and founded a workshop called "Fiffaro". In his shop, he built organ parts and worked on organ restorations.

Beniamino Giribaldi died in Imperia on 27 August 2021 at the age of 79.

== Works ==
- Convento di Santa Chiara (Imperia)
- Chiesa di Sant'Antonio Abate (Ventimiglia)
- Nostra Signora della Guardia (Alassio)
- Chiesa di San Biagio (Imperia)
- Chiesa di San Marco Evangelista (Civezza)
- Chiesa degli agostiniani (Menton)
