= Luigi Giribaldi =

- Born: 1925; Cavallermaggiore, Italy
- Died: 2012 (aged 86–87); Turin, Italy
- Children: 3

Luigi Giribaldi (1925-2012) was an Italian industrialist and activist investor. He was the founder of the first national express logistics and transportation firm in Italy, TRACO, and played a key role in several high-profile corporate takeovers and investments.

== Early life and career ==
Giribaldi was born on 9th August 1925 in Cavallermaggiore (Cuneo), Italy. In the 1960's, he founded the express transport firm TRACO (Trasporto Colli - Tra.Co. S.p.A.), based in Turin. Under his leadership, the firm evolved into Italy's first national logistics company. Giribaldi was a pioneer in express transport, and the company became a frontrunner in Europe as well. In the late 1980s, he sold TRACO to the multinational group TNT, establishing him as a major player in the Italian business scene. He remained Chairman of TNT Italy until 1991.

== Career as an activist investor ==
Following the sale of TRACO, Giribaldi gained prominence as an activist investor, employing strategies that played a pivotal role in revitalising the financial environment in Italy. Notable ventures included significant investments in companies such as Carlo De Benedetti’s CIR and Cofide.

In 1999, Giribaldi invested in the Italian industrial and chemical group SNIA, building a majority stake alongside Cornelio Valetto and challenging the control of Cesare Romiti. His move was part of a broader trend where activist investors across Europe, such as François Pinault and Martin Ebner, aimed to disrupt traditional European business practices.

The following year, he purchased a stake in the group HdP, in part owned by Gianni Agnelli. The group held notable assets such as the fashion house Valentino and the daily Italian paper Corriere della Sera.

In 2001, Giribaldi acquired a stake in the Scottish cashmere company Dawson International, continuing to expand his portfolio in fashion and luxury. In the same year, he invested in IT Holding (ITH), a fashion manufacturing company which owned the brand Gianfranco Ferré and Malo and produced clothes for brands such as Versace, Dolce & Gabbana, Etro and Exte’.

=== Toro Calcio ===
In the 1990s, Giribaldi attempted to buy the football team Torino Calcio following the financial collapse of the club under its previous president, Gian Mauro Borsano.

=== Later life and legacy ===
Giribaldi moved to Monte-Carlo in 1990, from where he would lead his financial operations. He was a known collector of luxury cars and watches. Luigi Giribaldi died in Turin at the age of 87. He was married and the father of three children.
