= Jabari Garibaldi =

Soccer player (born 1991)

Personal information
- Date of birth: August 24, 1991 (age 35)
- Place of birth: Miami, United States
- Height: 6 ft 0 in (1.83 m)
- Position: Defender

Team information
- Current team: Rovers
- Number: 31

Youth career
- 2008-2010: Schulz Academy

Senior career*
Years	Team	Apps	(Gls)
2011-2012	Orlando City B	24	(2)
2011-2012	Harbour View	9	(0)
2014-2015	Miami Dade FC	18	(1)
2016-2017	AaB II	12	(0)
2017-2019	→ RFC Reserves	26	(1)
2021-2022	Buxton	13	(0)
2022	Garswood United	5	(0)
2022-2023	Congleton Town	16	(0)
2024-	Rovers	6	(1)

International career^{‡}
2007	Jamaica U17	4	(0)
2024-	United States Virgin Islands	2	(0)
- * Club domestic league appearances and goals as of September 1, 2024 ‡ National team caps and goals as of 13:42, September 30, 2024 (UTC)

Jabari Garibaldi (born August 24, 1991) is a soccer player who plays as a defender for Rovers . Born in Miami, United States, he has represented the United States Virgin Islands internationally.

== Club career ==
Having left the Schulz Academy, Garibaldi moved to continue his soccer career semi-professional side Orlando City B. He moved to Jamaica to join Harbour View.

By September 2014, Garibaldi had returned to the United States and was competing for Miami Dade FC.

In August 2016 it was announced that Garibaldi had committed to play for AaB II in Denmark. He was later loan to RFC Reserves.

On July 1, 2021, Garibaldi signed with Buxton to play the 2021 season.

Garibaldi transferred to Garswood United in October 2022.

After few months at Garswood United, Garibaldi signed for rival club, Congleton Town.

He signed for Rovers of the U.S. Virgin Islands Association Club Championship on March 1, 2024. He scored a goal against Helenites SC in the opening match of the 2024 USVISF's President Cup.

== International career ==
Born to both Jamaican parents, Garibaldi received a called up into the Jamaica U17 for the 2007 CONCACAF U17 Tournament qualification rounds. Garibaldi was called into the United States Virgin Islands 's training camp squad in Saudi Arabia by coach Terrence Jones in September 2024 for two friendly match against Okaz FC. Garibaldi came on as a substitute in two friendly matches in preparation for 2024 CONCACAF Nations League tournament.

== Career statistics ==
=== International ===
As of match played 29 September 2024

National team	Year	Apps	Goals
United States Virgin Islands	2024	2	0
Total		2	0
