= Amblypomacentrus vietnamicus =

Scientific classification
- Kingdom: Animalia
- Phylum: Chordata
- Class: Actinopterygii
- Order: Blenniiformes
- Family: Pomacentridae
- Genus: Amblypomacentrus
- Species: A. vietnamicus

Binomial name
- Amblypomacentrus vietnamicus Prokofiev, 2004

Species of fish

Amblypomacentrus vietnamicus is a species of ray-finned fish from the family Pomacentridae, the damselfishes and clownfishes. It was described in 2004 from the South China Sea off Vietnam, It differs from its congeners in lacking the dark bars seen in Amblypomacentrus breviceps and A. clarus.
