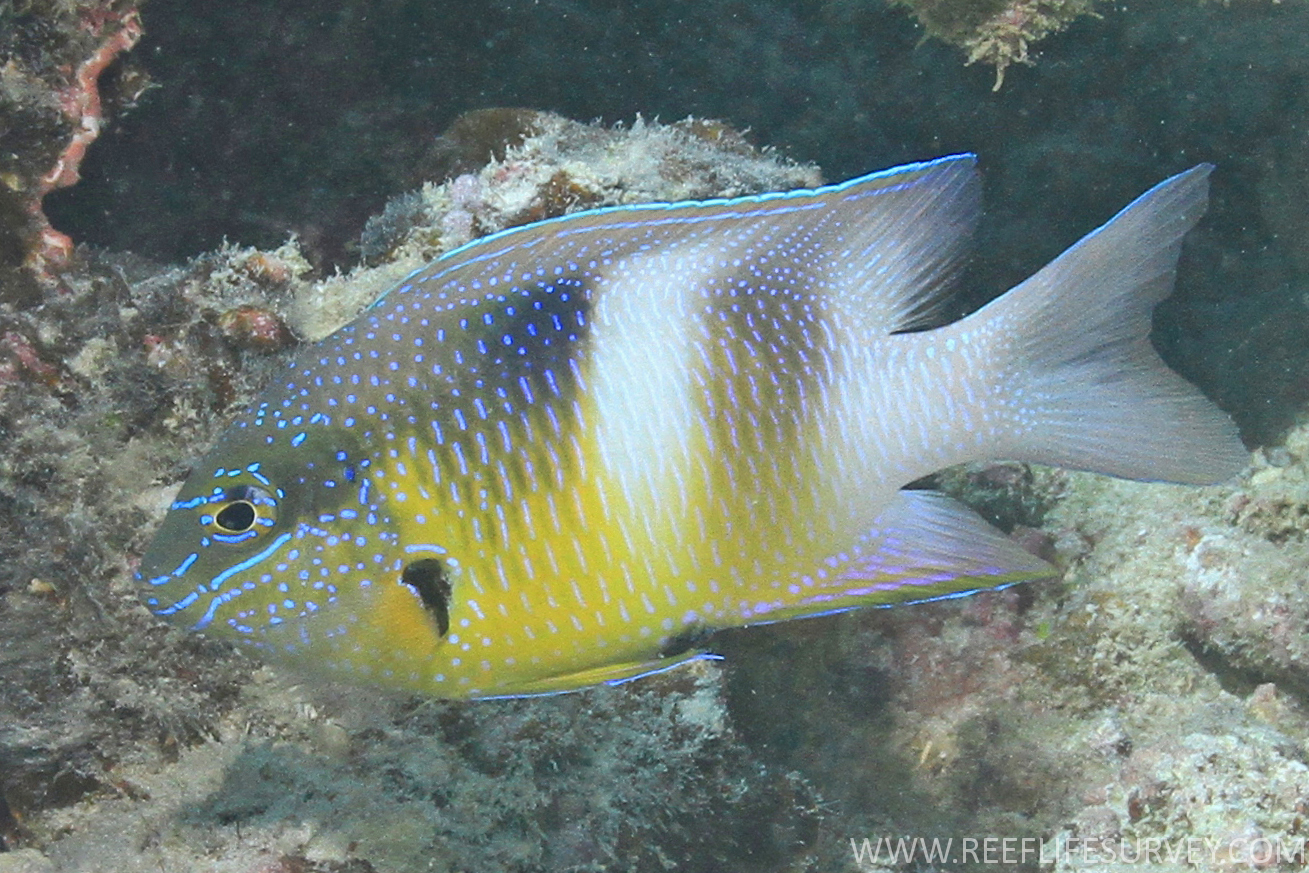
- yellow-breasted variant in Queensland
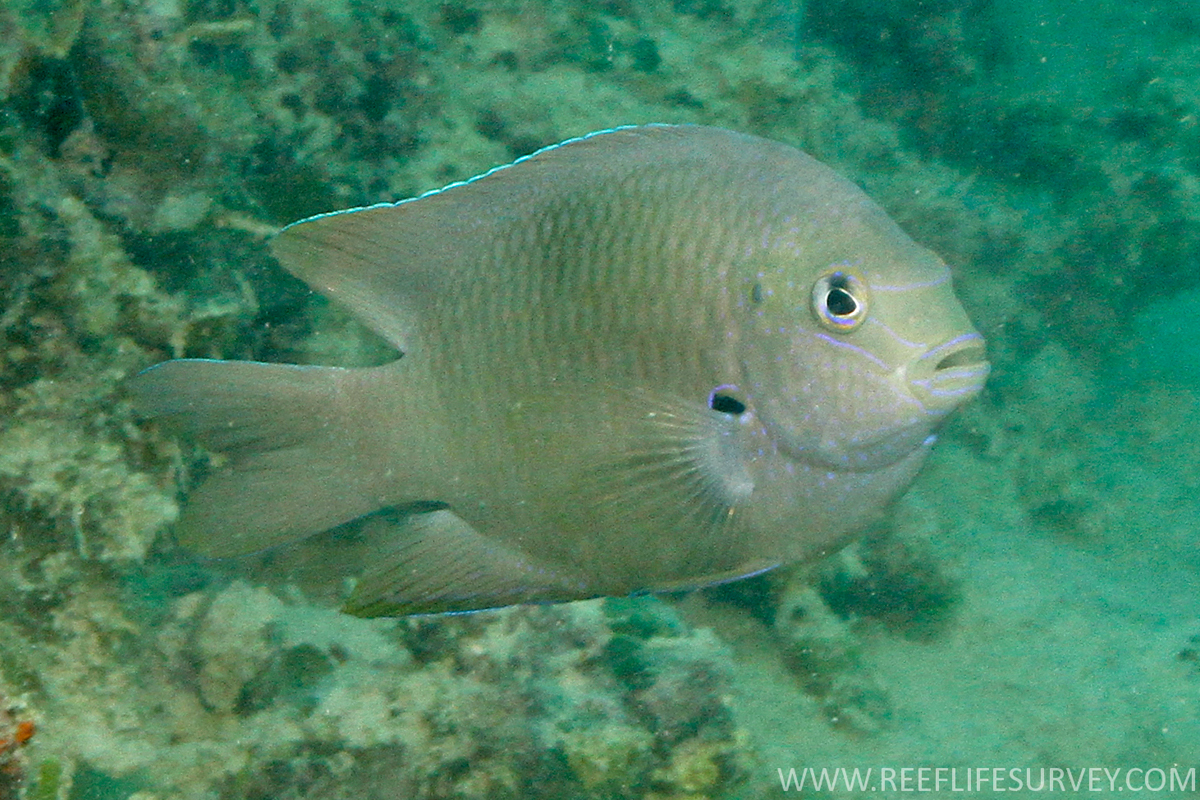
- white-breasted variant in Western Australia

Conservation status
- Least Concern (IUCN 3.1)

Scientific classification
- Kingdom: Animalia
- Phylum: Chordata
- Class: Actinopterygii
- Order: Blenniiformes
- Family: Pomacentridae
- Genus: Dischistodus
- Species: D. prosopotaenia

Binomial name
- Dischistodus prosopotaenia (Bleeker, 1852)

= Dischistodus prosopotaenia =

Species of fish

Dischistodus prosopotaenia, also known as honey-head damsel and honey-breast damsel, is a species of damselfish. It is native to the eastern Indian Ocean and western Pacific. It reaches up to 17 centimetres (6.7 in) in length. The fish usually has a white breast, but there is a yellow-breasted variant that also has a black blotch on each side. The fish lives in lagoons and reefs.

== Gallery ==
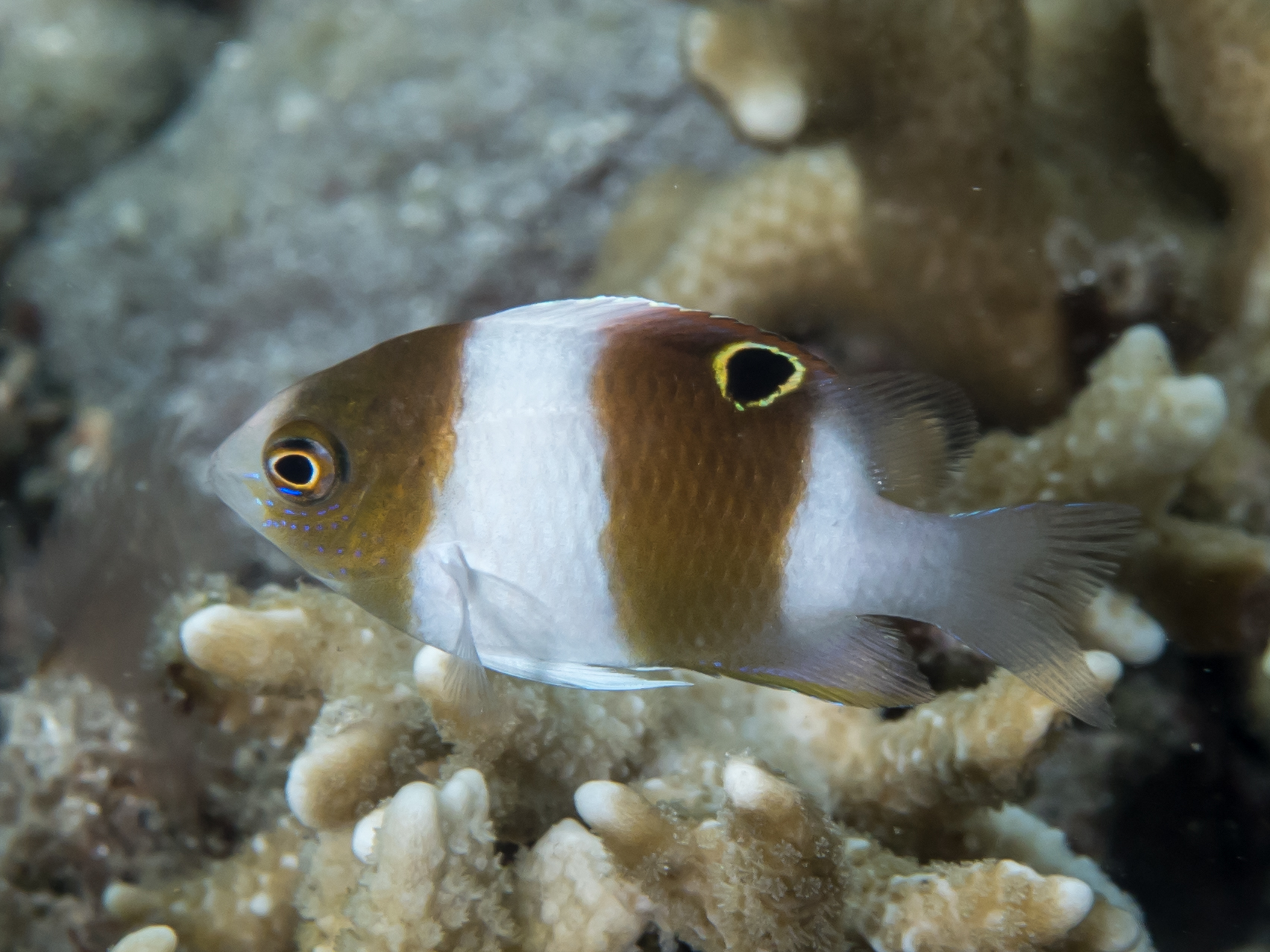
Young juvenile

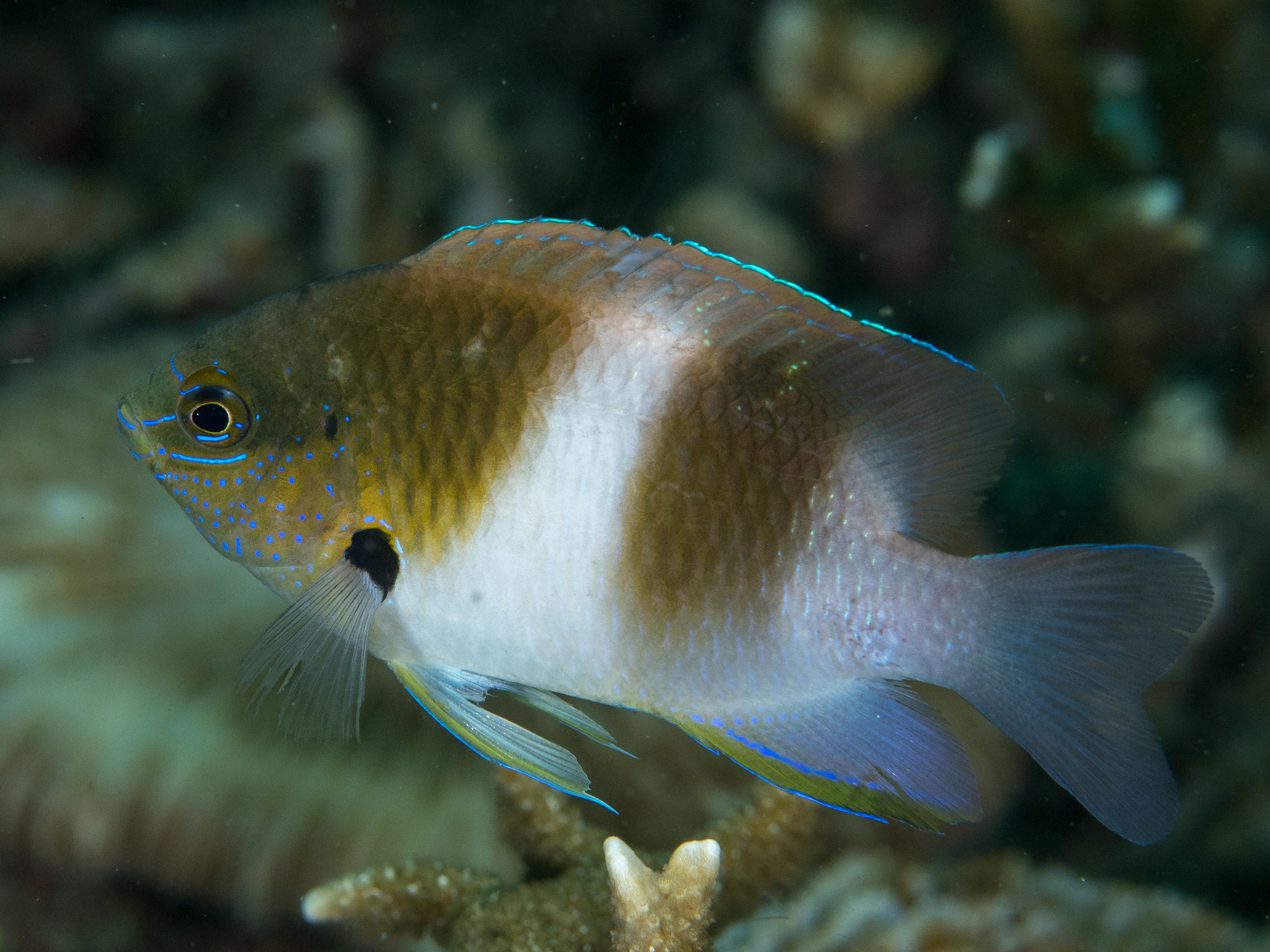
Older juvenile
