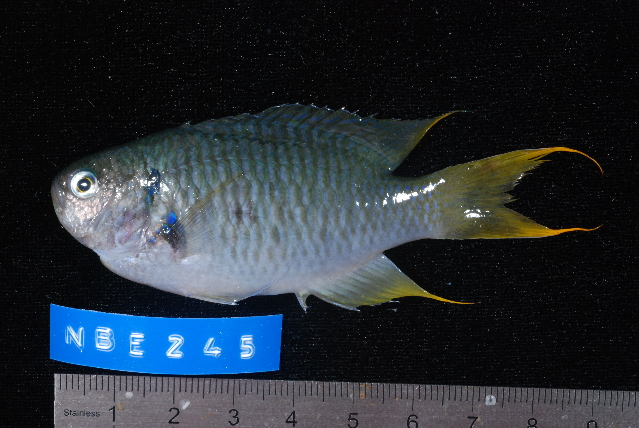

Conservation status
- Least Concern (IUCN 3.1)

Scientific classification
- Kingdom: Animalia
- Phylum: Chordata
- Class: Actinopterygii
- Order: Blenniiformes
- Family: Pomacentridae
- Genus: Neopomacentrus
- Species: N. azysron

Binomial name
- Neopomacentrus azysron (Bleeker, 1877)

Synonyms
- Pomacentrus azysron Bleeker, 1877; Abudefduf melanocarpus Fowler & Bean, 1928

= Neopomacentrus azysron =

Species of fish

Neopomacentrus azysron is a damselfish from the Indo-West Pacific. It occasionally makes its way into the aquarium trade. It grows to a size of 7.5 cm in length.
