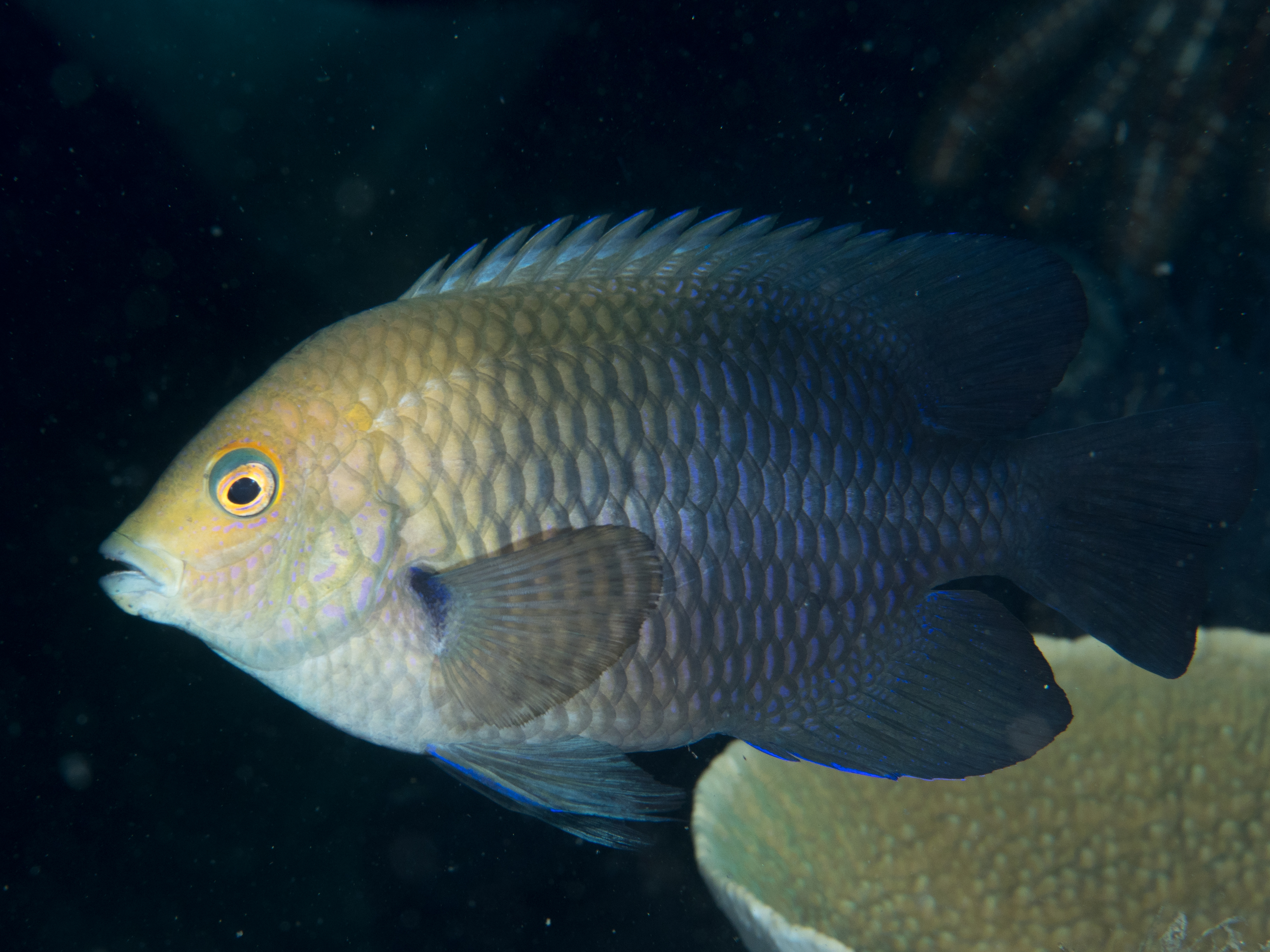

Conservation status
- Least Concern (IUCN 3.1)

Scientific classification
- Kingdom: Animalia
- Phylum: Chordata
- Class: Actinopterygii
- Order: Blenniiformes
- Family: Pomacentridae
- Subfamily: Pomacentrinae
- Genus: Hemiglyphidodon; Bleeker, 1877
- Species: H. plagiometopon

Binomial name
- Hemiglyphidodon plagiometopon (Bleeker, 1852)

Synonyms
- Glyphisodon plagiometopon Bleeker, 1852; Glyphisodon batjanensis Bleeker, 1855; Abudefduf melanopselion Fowler, 1918

= Lagoon damselfish =

Species of fish

The lagoon damselfish (Hemiglyphidodon plagiometopon), also known as the sweetlip damsel, is a species of ray-finned fish, a damselfish from the family Pomacentridae. It is a larger species of damselfish which is found in the Indo-Pacific where it occurs around branching corals in sheltered areas of reefs.

== Description ==
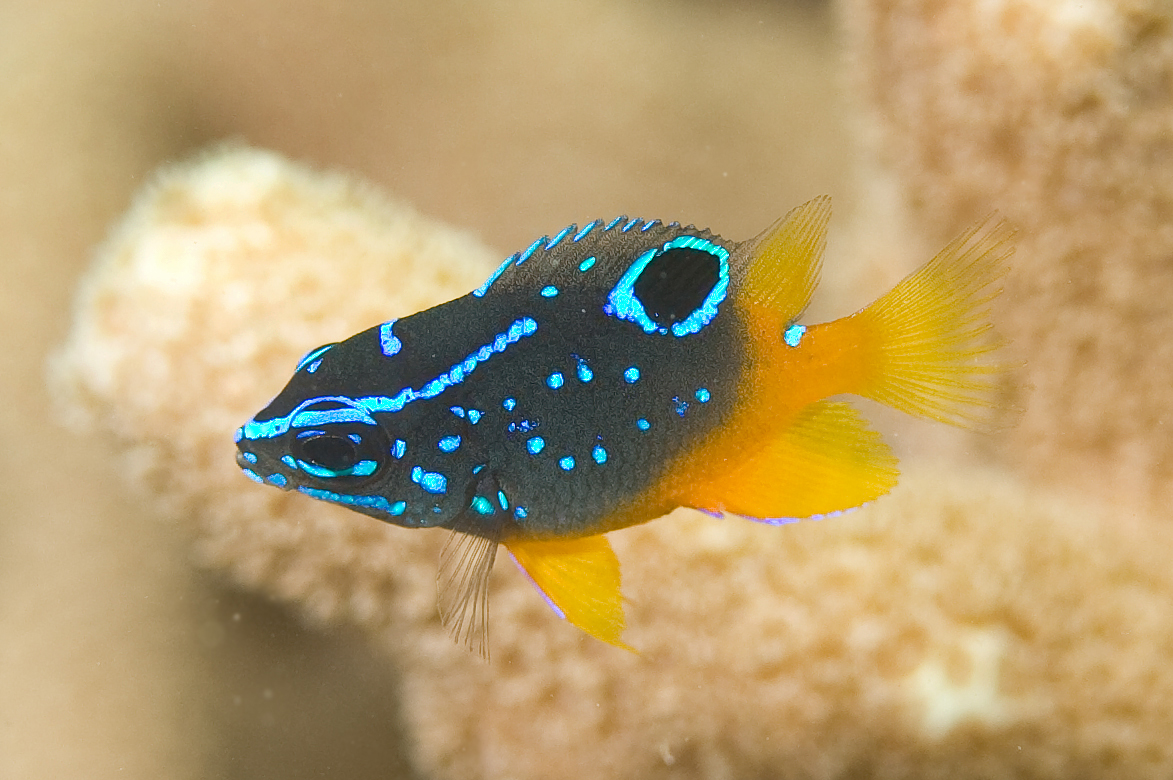
Juvenile, in Japan

The lagoon damselfish is a large brown species of damselfish, often the adults have a pale russet head and the colour of the fish gradually darkens towards the tail. There are pinkish markings on the operculum. The juveniles are dark blue to brownish on the head and near body and are yellow towards the tail and on the underside with a large iridescent blue eyespot on the dorsal fin, and blue bands and spots near the head on its body. They grow to a maximum length of 18 centimetres (7.1 in). Sometimes the only distinctive marking is a yellow eyering.

== Distribution ==
The lagoon damselfish is found in the eastern Indian Ocean from Thailand through Indonesia, the Philippines and the Timor Sea into the western Pacific where it is found south to Australia and north to China and east to the Solomon Islands.

== Habitat and biology ==
The lagoon damselfish is found in sheltered reefs and lagoons, often in areas of high turbidity and a silty substrate at the base of branching corals. They are found at depths of 1–20 metres (3–66 ft). They are detritovores and the species has up to three times the number of gill rakers than other damselfish which are for feeding on fine detritus. They are territorial and defend a patch of algal covered reef. While feeding on detritus they will consume small amounts of algae and invertebrates. They form pairs for breeding, clearing an area to create a nest, then they begin in a mating dance which involves fast swimming and movements of the fins. While mating, the males frequently darken and may develop white blotches. The eggs are laid at dawn, and are demersal which adhere to the substrate where the male guards and aerates them.

== Conservation ==
The lagoon damselfish has been evaluated for the IUCN Red List of Threatened Species as Least Concern, but it may be threatened by habitat degradation and by human exploitation.
