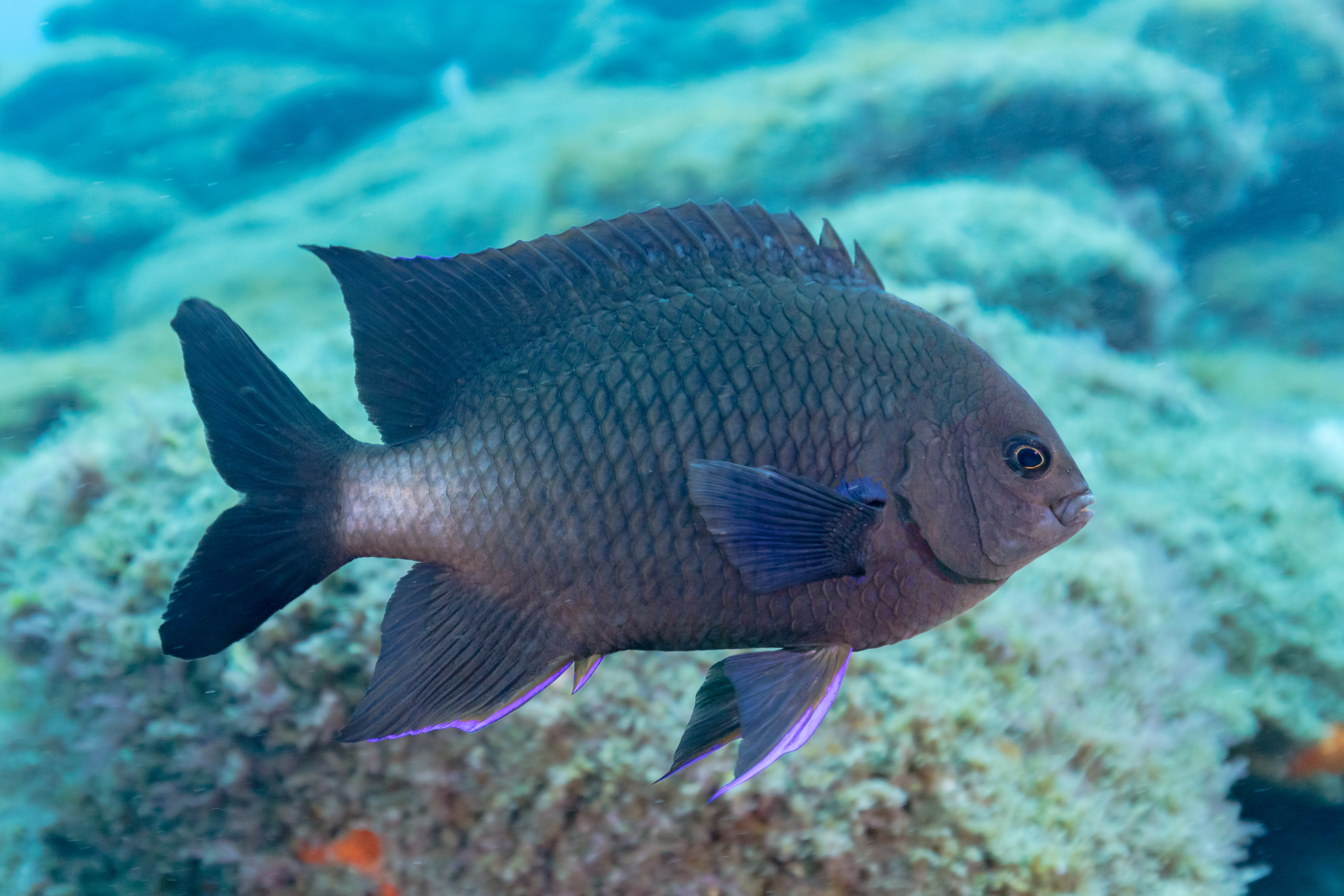

Conservation status
- Least Concern (IUCN 3.1)

Scientific classification
- Kingdom: Animalia
- Phylum: Chordata
- Class: Actinopterygii
- Order: Blenniiformes
- Family: Pomacentridae
- Genus: Similiparma
- Species: S. lurida

Binomial name
- Similiparma lurida (Cuvier, 1830)

Synonyms
- Glyphisodon luridus Cuvier, 1830; Chaetodon luridus (Cuvier, 1830); Chaetodonton luridi Gmelin, 1789; Abudefduf luridus (Cuvier, 1830)

= Canary damsel =

Species of fish

The Canary damsel (Similiparma lurida), or Cape Verde gregory (which is also a common name of Stegastes imbricatus) is a species of marine fish of the family Pomacentridae. It lives primary in shallow, subtropical waters of the eastern Atlantic Ocean.

== Distribution and habitat ==
Canary damsels are commonly associated with rocky inshore areas of the eastern Atlantic Ocean; specifically, they are found in the waters of Macaronesia (Madeira, Azores, Savage Islands, Canary Islands, Cape Verde) and Senegal at depths to about 25 metres (82 ft). Juveniles may be found in tide pools.

== Description ==
Canary damsels have large eyes, and is primarily black to brownish black, with lighter colors on the ventral part of the body and blue fin margins. Juveniles may have lateral stripes on their bodies as well. During their mating season, adults exhibit sexual dimorphism. Individuals may grow to 15 cm in length.

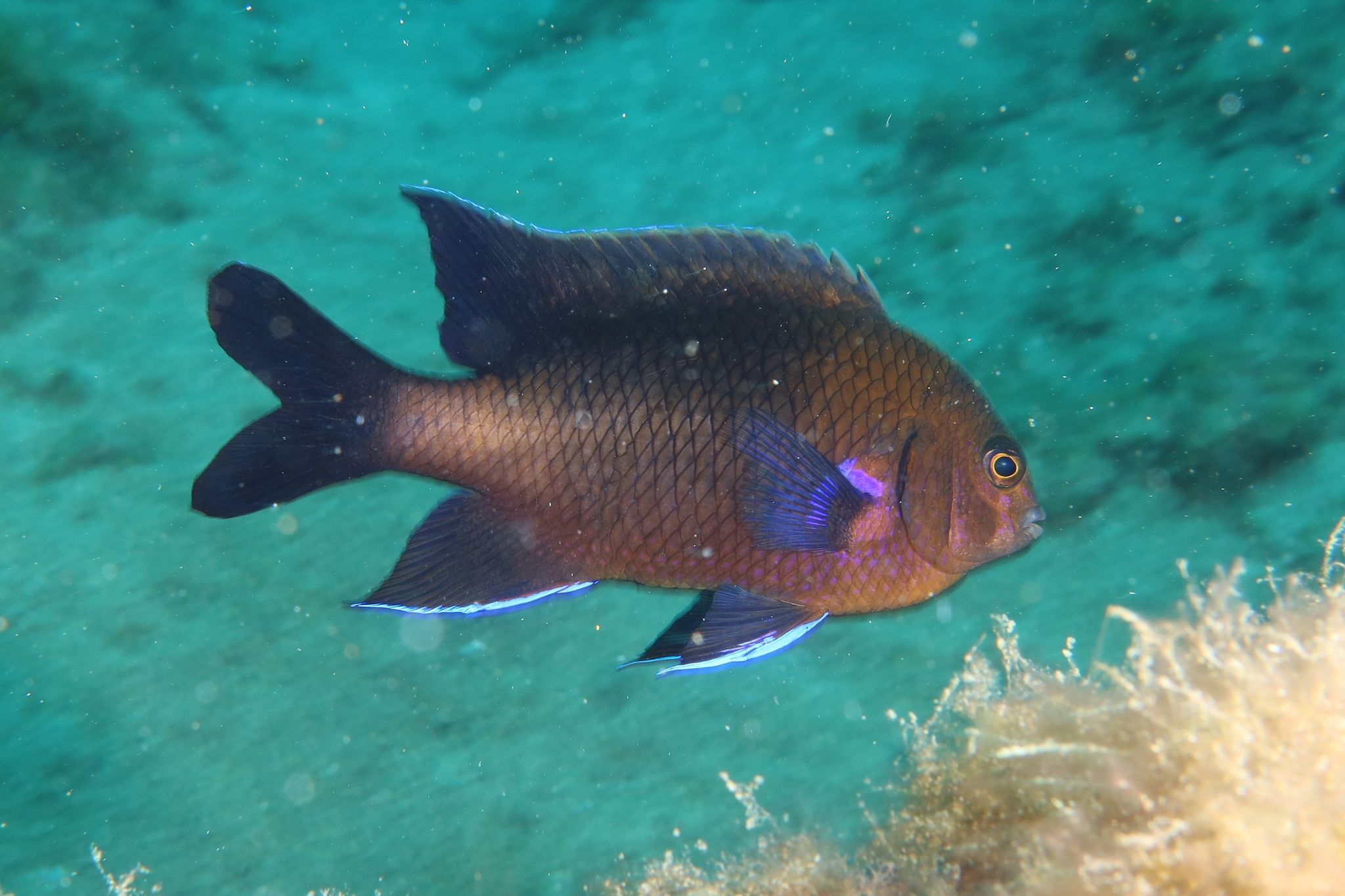

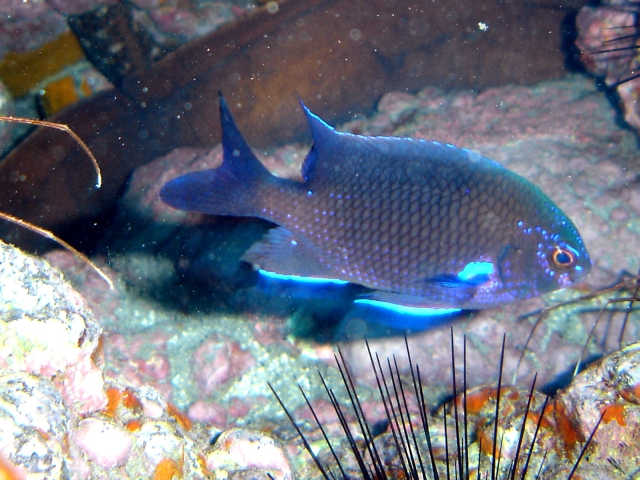

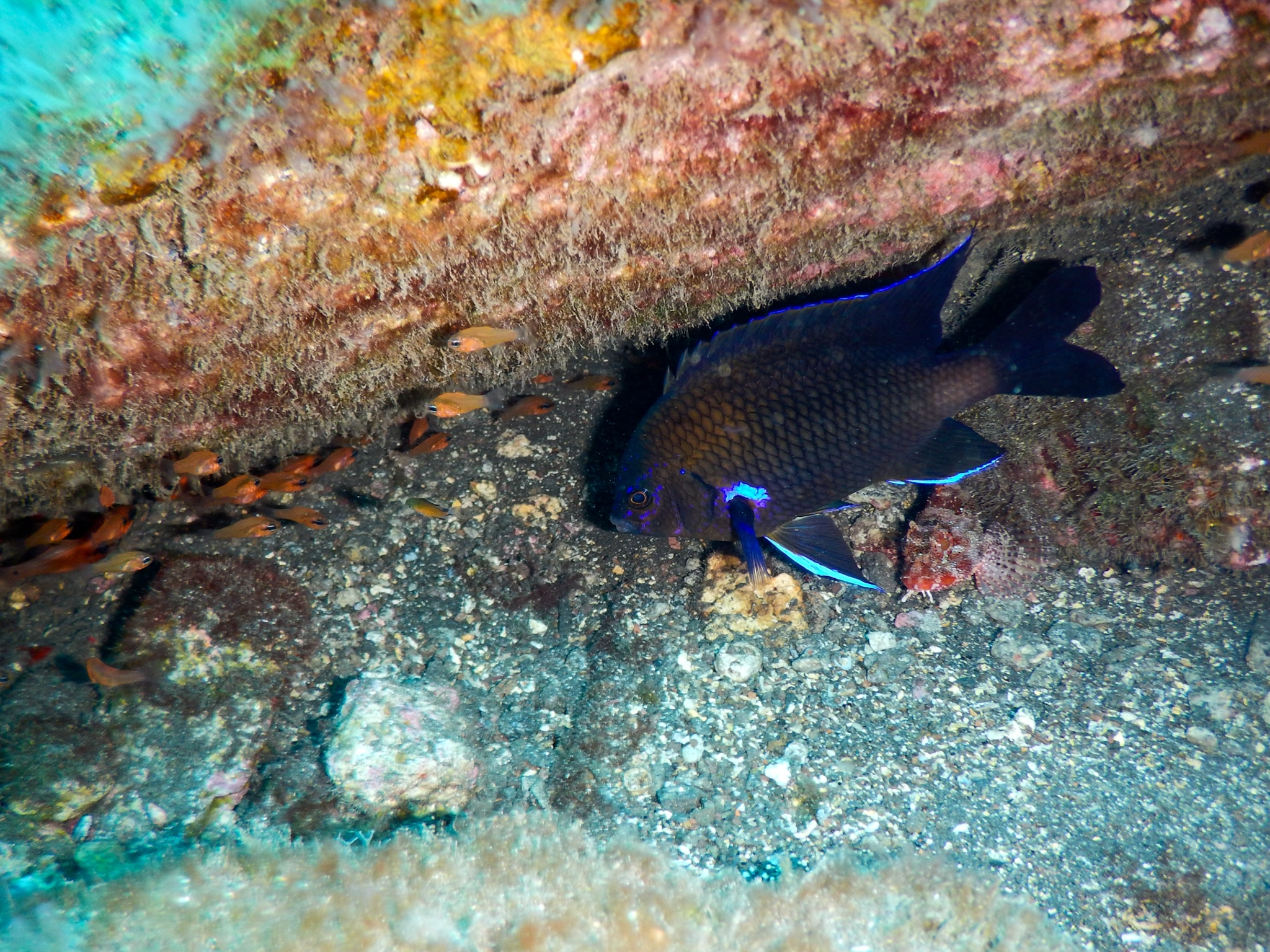

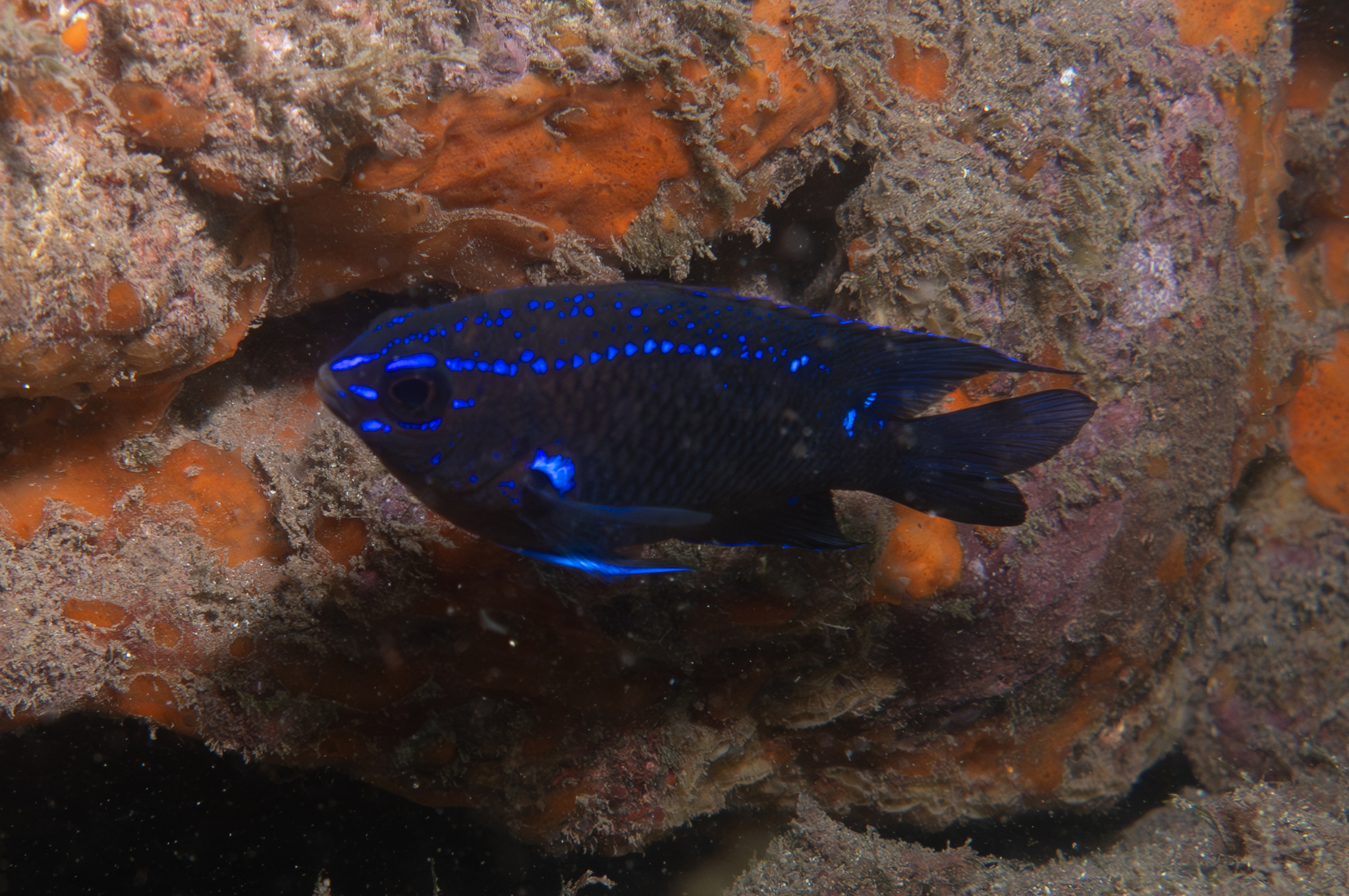
Juvenile

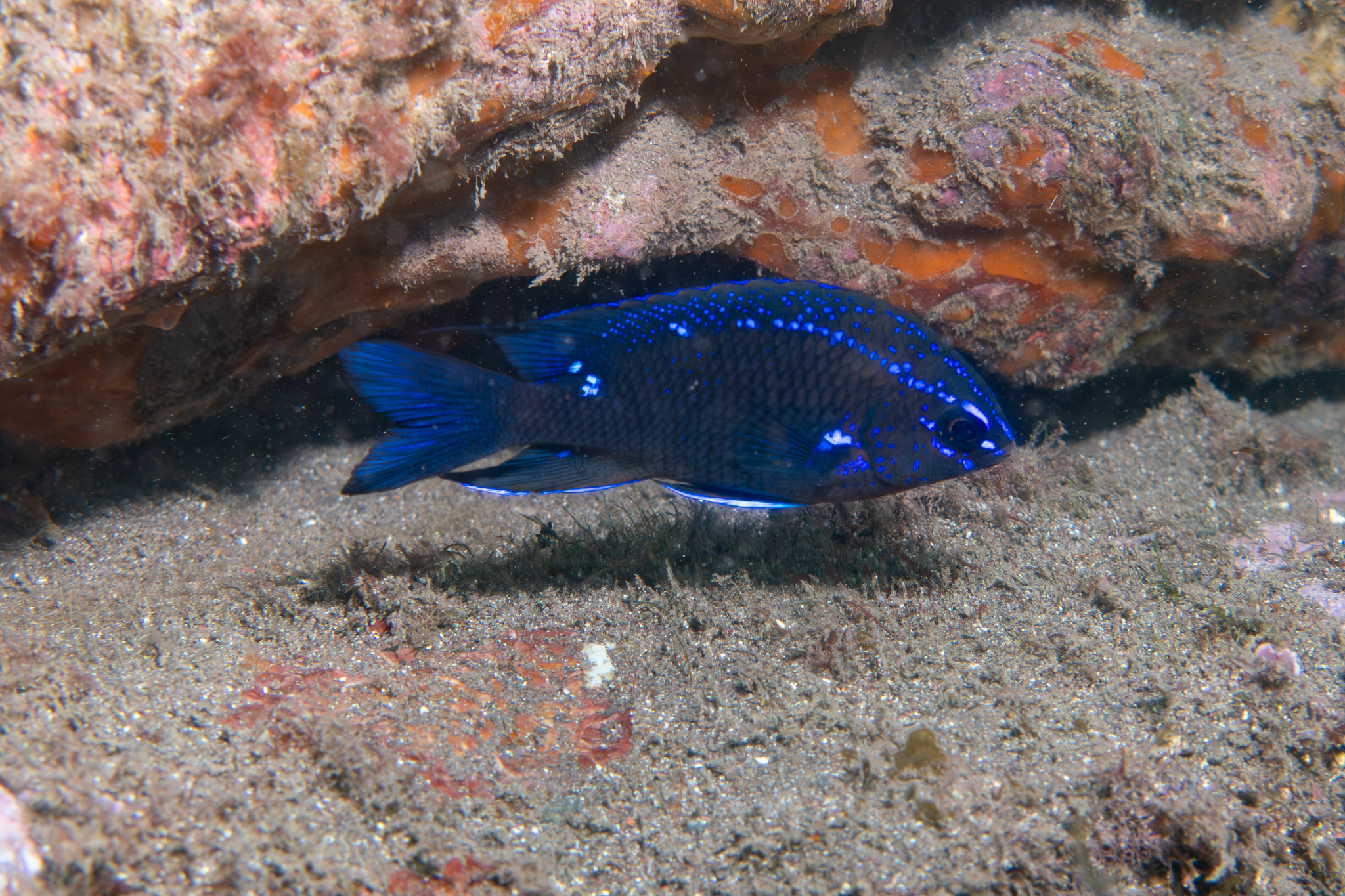
Juvenile

== Diet ==
Canary damsels feed primarily on algae and small invertebrates.

== Reproduction ==
The eggs of Canary damsels are demersal and attach to substrates. They are laid in a nest, and protected by the male.

== Relationship with humans ==
The Canary damsel is sometimes harvested for use in saltwater aquaria, but this is done on a very small scale. This, along with a non-fragmented range, no evidence of population decline and the fact that the Canary damsel is found in many marine protected regions, has led the IUCN to classify it as "Least Concern".
