= Neopomacentrus anabatoides =

Conservation status
- Least Concern (IUCN 3.1)

Scientific classification
- Kingdom: Animalia
- Phylum: Chordata
- Class: Actinopterygii
- Order: Blenniiformes
- Family: Pomacentridae
- Genus: Neopomacentrus
- Species: N. anabatoides

Binomial name
- Neopomacentrus anabatoides (Bleeker, 1847)

Synonyms
- Glyphisodon anabatoides Bleeker, 1847

Species of fish

Neopomacentrus anabatoides, commonly known as the silver demoiselle, is a fish native to the western Pacific Ocean.
