= Amblypomacentrus clarus =

Conservation status
- Least Concern (IUCN 3.1)

Scientific classification
- Kingdom: Animalia
- Phylum: Chordata
- Class: Actinopterygii
- Order: Blenniiformes
- Family: Pomacentridae
- Genus: Amblypomacentrus
- Species: A. clarus

Binomial name
- Amblypomacentrus clarus Allen & Adrim, 2000

Species of fish

Amblypomacentrus clarus, the Bangaii damselfish is a species of ray-finned fish, a damselfish from the family Pomacentridae'. It is found in south-east Asia with records from Indonesia, the Philippines and Cambodia. It is similar to Amblypomacentrus breviceps, with which it is sympatric but it is separated by the patten of the body with the three dark bars being more contarsed than in A. breviceps, and it does not have the rows of light blue spots on its flanks and a diffuse yellow colouration on the lower body also frequently shown by A. breviceps.
