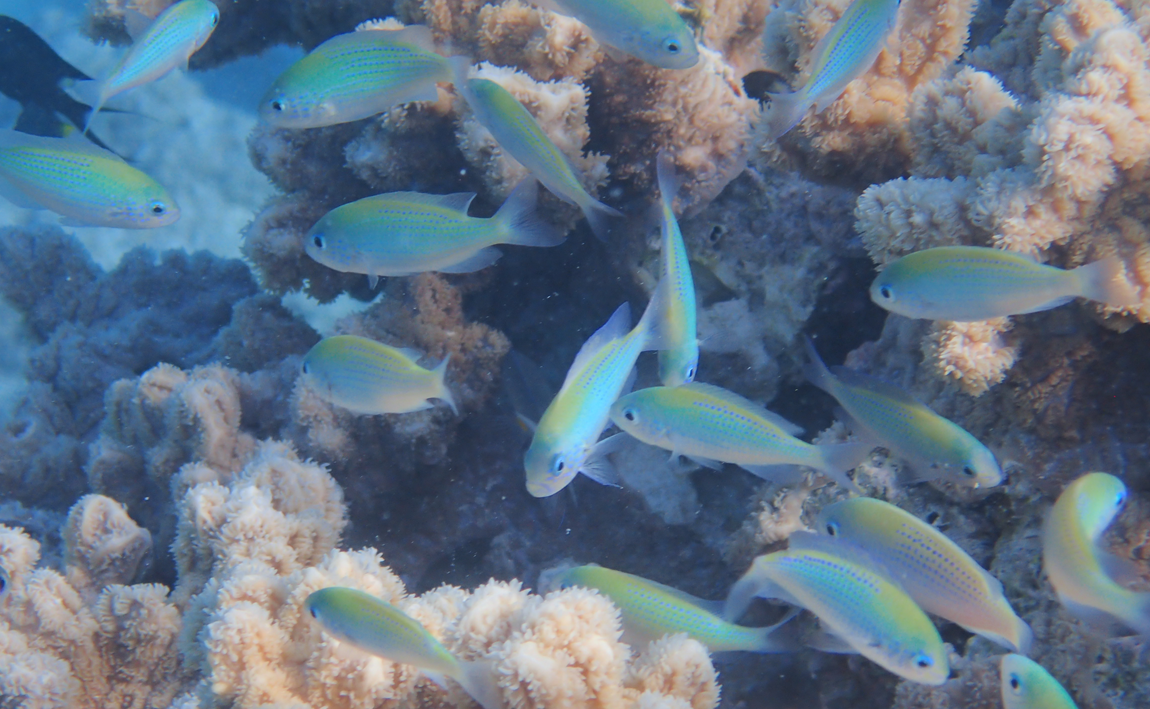
- Pristotis cyanostigma

Scientific classification
- Kingdom: Animalia
- Phylum: Chordata
- Class: Actinopterygii
- Order: Blenniiformes
- Family: Pomacentridae
- Subfamily: Pomacentrinae
- Genus: Pristotis; Rüppell, 1838

Type species
- Pristotis cyanostigma Rüppell 1838

= Pristotis =

Genus of fishes

Pristotis is a genus of fish in the family Pomacentridae.

== Species ==
There are two species currently recognized by FishBase:

- Pristotis cyanostigma (Rüppell, 1838)
- Pristotis obtusirostris (Günther, 1862)
