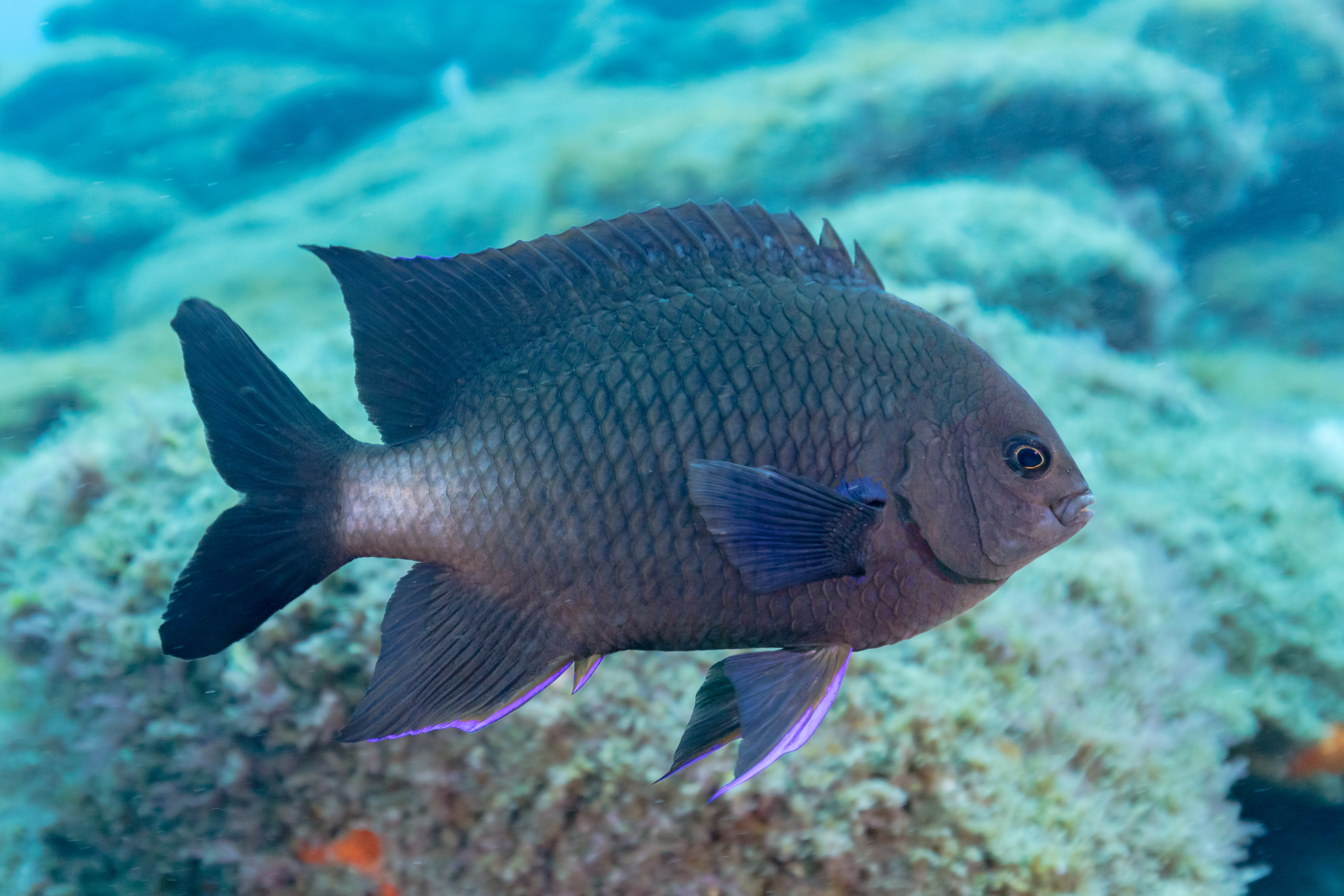
- Similiparma lurida
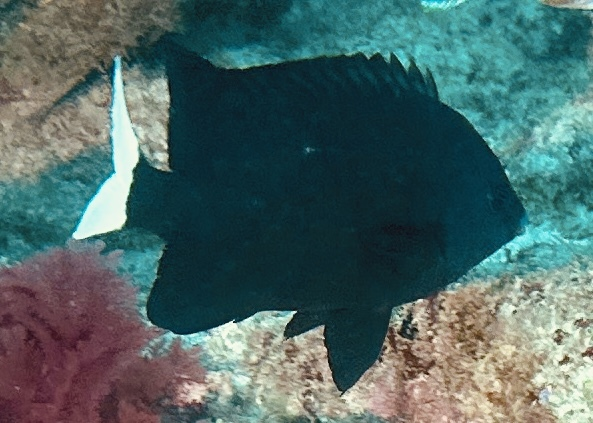
- Similiparma hermani

Scientific classification
- Kingdom: Animalia
- Phylum: Chordata
- Class: Actinopterygii
- Order: Blenniiformes
- Family: Pomacentridae
- Subfamily: Pomacentrinae
- Genus: Similiparma; Hensley, 1986

= Similiparma =

Genus of fish

Similiparma is a genus of ray-finned fish in the damselfish and clownfish family, Pomacentridae.

== Species ==
The following two species are recognised in the genus Similiparma:

- Similiparma hermani (Steindachner, 1887)
- Similiparma lurida (Cuvier, 1830)
