= Immaculate damselfish =

- adult
- juvenile

Scientific classification
- Kingdom: Animalia
- Phylum: Chordata
- Class: Actinopterygii
- Order: Blenniiformes
- Family: Pomacentridae
- Subfamily: Pomacentrinae
- Genus: Mecaenichthys; Ogilby, 1885
- Species: M. immaculatus

Binomial name
- Mecaenichthys immaculatus (Ogilby, 1885)

Synonyms
- Heliastes immaculatus Ogilby, 1885

Species of fish

The immaculate damselfish (Mecaenichthys immaculatus), also known as the green puller, is a species of ray-finned fish, it is the only species in the monotypic genus Mecaenichthys, classified in the subfamily Pomacentrinae of the family Pomacentridae.

The immaculate damselfish is distinguished from other species of damselfishes by having a pointed head with large eyes and bluish-silver coloured body with a thin blue iridescent margin around the caudal fin. The juveniles are orange in colour with bright blue iridescent stripes. The juveniles are similar to juveniles of the damselfish of the genus Parma. This species grows to 15 centimetres (5.9 in).

The Immaculate damselfish is endemic to Australia where it is known from marine waters of southern Queensland to southern New South Wales. The species is found in depths of 0–55 metres (0–180 ft). The adults are found on rocky or weedy inshore reefs and form pairs during breeding. Their eggs are demersal and adhere to the substrate where they are guarded and aerated by the male.
