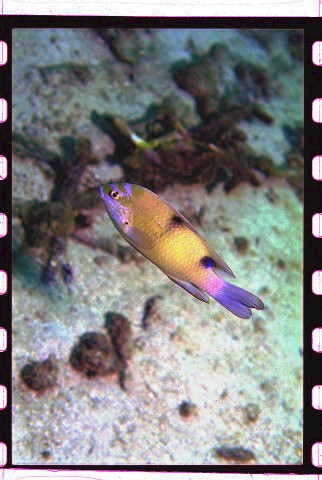

Conservation status
- Least Concern (IUCN 3.1)

Scientific classification
- Kingdom: Animalia
- Phylum: Chordata
- Class: Actinopterygii
- Order: Blenniiformes
- Family: Pomacentridae
- Genus: Dischistodus
- Species: D. perspicillatus

Binomial name
- Dischistodus perspicillatus (Cuvier, 1830)

Synonyms
- Pomacentrus perspicillatus Cuvier, 1830; Pomacentrus trimaculatus Cuvier, 1830; Dischistodus trimaculatus (Cuvier, 1830); Pomacentrus bifasciatus Bleeker, 1854; Pomacentrus frenatus De Vis, 1885; Pomacentrus dorsomaculatus Kendall & Goldsborough, 1911; Chromis humbug Whitley, 1954

= Dischistodus perspicillatus =

Species of fish

Dischistodus perspicillatus, commonly known as the white damsel, is a species of fish native to the Andaman Sea and eastern Indian Ocean.

== Characteristics ==
The white damsel is mainly white or light colored, with some black spots. They have minimal sexual dimorphism. The species can reach a length of 18.0 cm (7.1 in), and they have a total of 13 dorsal spines.

== Behavior ==
The white damsel lives near coral reefs with algae or seagrass. They are diurnal. The fish has a territorial nature that may lead to possible aggression. Their territoriality may be due to protecting their algae from other herbivores against detrital production and accumulation.
