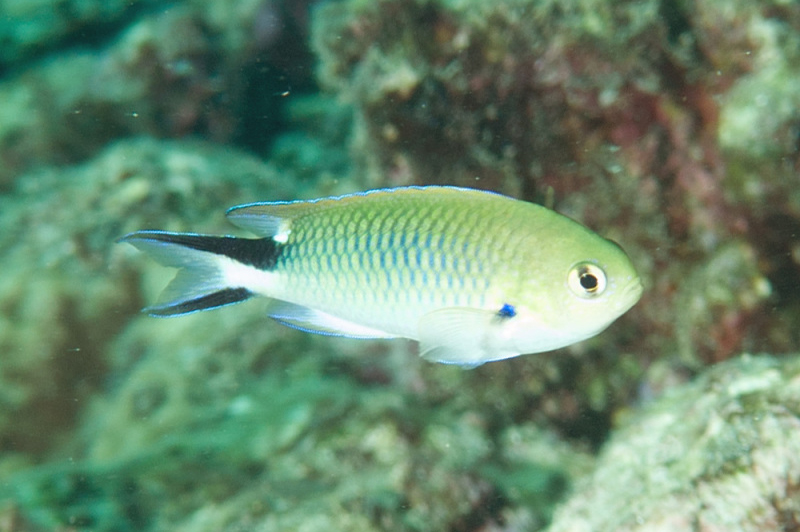
- Pomachromis richardsoni

Scientific classification
- Kingdom: Animalia
- Phylum: Chordata
- Class: Actinopterygii
- Order: Blenniiformes
- Family: Pomacentridae
- Subfamily: Pomacentrinae
- Genus: Pomachromis; Allen and Randall, 1974

Type species
- Abudefduf richardsoni Snyder 1909

= Pomachromis =

Genus of fishes

Pomachromis is a genus of fish in the family Pomacentridae.

== Species ==
Species	Image
Pomachromis exilis (Allen and Emery, 1973)	
Pomachromis fuscidorsalis Allen & Randall, 1974	
Pomachromis guamensis Allen and Larson, 1975	
Pomachromis richardsoni (Snyder, 1909)	
