= Jordan's damsel =

Conservation status
- Least Concern (IUCN 3.1)

Scientific classification
- Kingdom: Animalia
- Phylum: Chordata
- Class: Actinopterygii
- Clade: Ovalentaria
- Order: Blenniiformes
- Family: Pomacentridae
- Subfamily: Pomacentrinae
- Genus: Teixeirichthys; J. L. B. Smith, 1953
- Species: T. jordani

Binomial name
- Teixeirichthys jordani Rutter, 1897

Synonyms
- Pomacentrus jordani Rutter, 1897; Pristotis jordani (Rutter, 1897); Pomacentrus polylepis Regan, 1908; Pomacentrus formosanus Fowler & B.A. Bean, 1922; Teixeirichthys formosanus (Fowler & Bean, 1922); Teixeirichthys mossambicus J. L. B. Smith, 1953

Species of fish

Jordan's damsel (Teixeirichthys jordani) is a species of ray-finned fish from the family Pomacentridae, the damselfishes and clownfishes, it is the only species in the monotypic genus Teixeirichthys. It has a disjunct distribution in the Indian and western pacific Oceans having been recorded from the Red Sea, Mozambique Channel, Seychelles, Taiwan, Hong Kong, China and Japan. It is found in beds of sea grass and over sandy substrates. Jordan's damsel is frequently observed to form mid-water aggregations of as many as several hundreds of individuals. It occurs at depths of 10–20 metres (33–66 ft). It has been recorded using small rocky outcrops and areas of debris to nest in in the Gulf of Aqaba. The generic name honours Gabriel M. Teixeira (1897-1973), who was the Governor-General of Mozambique and who assisted J. L. B. Smith's studies of the fish fauna of that territory. The specific name and common name both honour the American ichthyologist David Starr Jordan (1851-1931) who gave a collection of specimens from Swatow to Rutter, among which was the type of this species.
