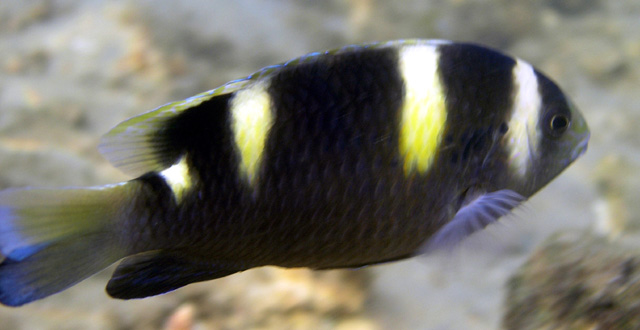
- Dischistodus fasciatus

Scientific classification
- Kingdom: Animalia
- Phylum: Chordata
- Class: Actinopterygii
- Division: Teleostei
- Order: Blenniiformes
- Family: Pomacentridae
- Subfamily: Pomacentrinae
- Genus: Dischistodus; Gill, 1863

Type species
- Pomacentrus fasciatus Cuvier, 1830

= Dischistodus =

Genus of fishes

Dischistodus is a genus of fish in the family Pomacentridae. It has seven described species.

== Species ==
Species	Common name	Image
Dischistodus chrysopoecilus (Schlegel and Müller, 1839)	white-spot damsel	
Dischistodus darwiniensis (Whitley, 1928)	banded damsel	
Dischistodus fasciatus (Cuvier in Cuvier and Valenciennes, 1830)	banded damsel	
Dischistodus melanotus (Bleeker, 1858)	black-vent damsel	
Dischistodus perspicillatus (Cuvier in Cuvier and Valenciennes, 1830)	white damsel	
Dischistodus prosopotaenia (Bleeker, 1852)	honey-head damsel	
Dischistodus pseudochrysopoecilus (G. R. Allen & D. R. Robertson, 1974)	monarch damsel	
