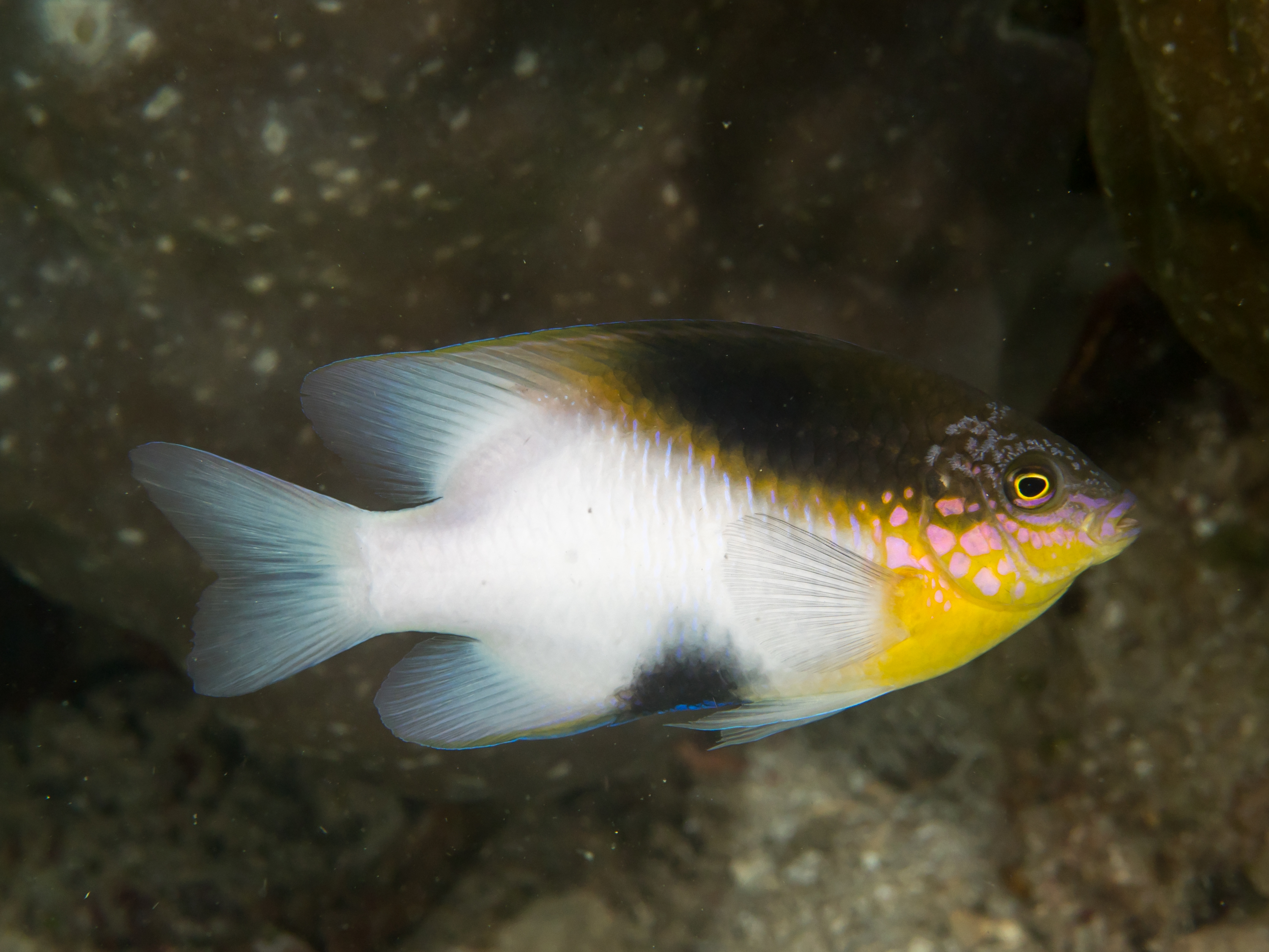

Conservation status
- Least Concern (IUCN 3.1)

Scientific classification
- Kingdom: Animalia
- Phylum: Chordata
- Class: Actinopterygii
- Order: Blenniiformes
- Family: Pomacentridae
- Genus: Dischistodus
- Species: D. melanotus

Binomial name
- Dischistodus melanotus (Bleeker, 1858)

Synonyms
- Pomacentrus melanotus Bleeker, 1858

= Dischistodus melanotus =

Species of fish

Dischistodus melanotus, commonly known as the black-vent damsel, is a species of fish found in the western Pacific Ocean.

== Description ==
This species reaches a length of 16.0 cm (6.3 in).
