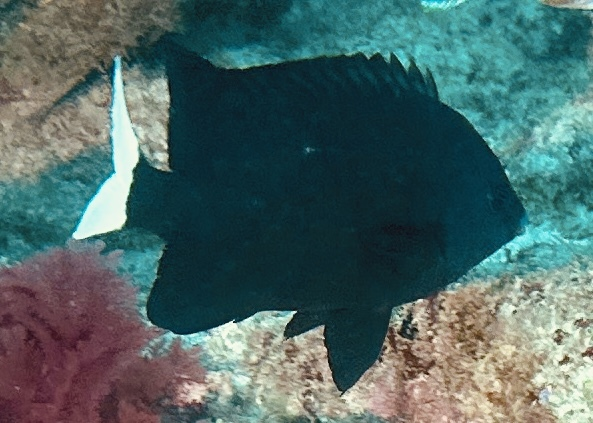

Scientific classification
- Kingdom: Animalia
- Phylum: Chordata
- Class: Actinopterygii
- Order: Blenniiformes
- Family: Pomacentridae
- Genus: Similiparma
- Species: S. hermani

Binomial name
- Similiparma hermani Steindachner 1887

Synonyms
- Glyphidodon hermani Steindachner, 1887

= Cape damsel =

Species of fish

The Cape damsel (Similiparma hermani) is a species of ray-finned fish in the damselfish and clownfish family, Pomacentridae, It is found in the eastern Atlantic Ocean where it is endemic to Cape Verde occurring among rocky inshore areas.

The specific name honours a Lieutenant Herman who collected the type specimen on his way to a posting in the Congo.
