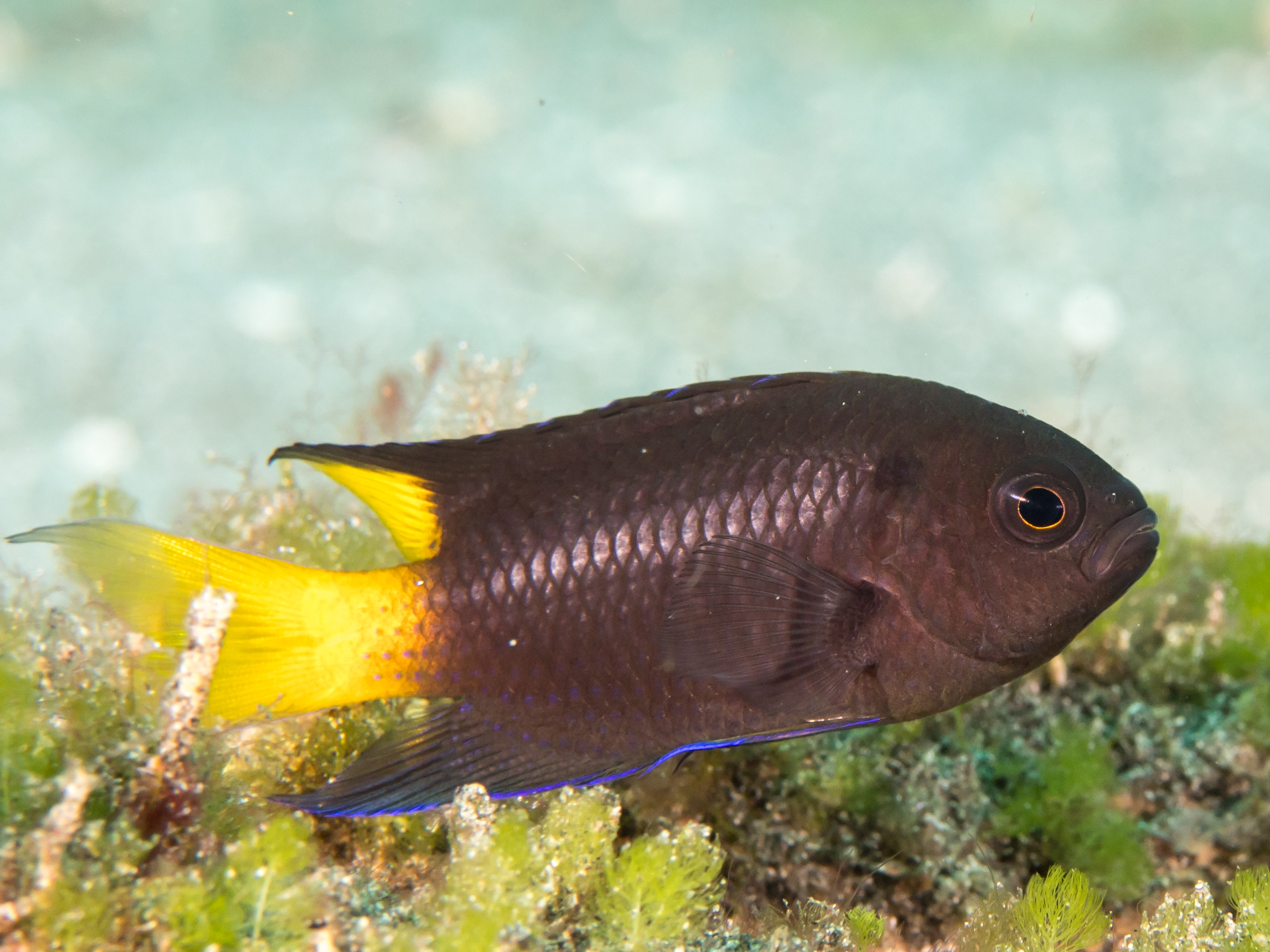
- Neopomacentrus violascens

Scientific classification
- Kingdom: Animalia
- Phylum: Chordata
- Class: Actinopterygii
- Order: Blenniiformes
- Family: Pomacentridae
- Subfamily: Pomacentrinae
- Genus: Neopomacentrus; Allen, 1975

Type species
- Glyphisodon anabatoides Bleeker, 1847

= Lyretail damselfish =

Genus of fishes

The lyretail damselfishes are fishes in the genus Neopomacentrus in the family Pomacentridae. They are all marine coastal fishes but N. taeniurus and N. aquadulcis are known to occur in brackish waters, and even in pure fresh water.

== Species ==
Species	Common name	Image
Neopomacentrus aktites Allen, Moore & Allen, 2017	Western Australian demoiselle	
Neopomacentrus anabatoides (Bleeker, 1847)	Silver demoiselle	
Neopomacentrus aquadulcis Jenkins and Allen, 2002	Sweetwater demoiselle	
Neopomacentrus azysron (Bleeker, 1877)	Yellowtail demoiselle	
Neopomacentrus bankieri (Richardson, 1846)	Chinese demoiselle	
Neopomacentrus cyanomos (Bleeker, 1856)	Regal demoiselle	
Neopomacentrus fallax (Peters, 1855)	Violet damsel	
Neopomacentrus filamentosus (Macleay, 1882)	Brown demoiselle	
Neopomacentrus flavicauda Fricke & Allen, 2021		
Neopomacentrus fuliginosus (Smith, 1960)	African demoiselle	
Neopomacentrus metallicus (Jordan and Seale, 1906)	Metallic demoiselle	
Neopomacentrus miryae Dor and Allen, 1977	Miry's demoiselle	
Neopomacentrus nemurus (Bleeker, 1857)	Coral demoiselle	
Neopomacentrus simulatus Allen & Erdmann 2024		
Neopomacentrus sindensis (Day, 1873)	Arabian demoiselle	
Neopomacentrus sororius Randall and Allen, 2005	Twin demoiselle	
Neopomacentrus taeniurus (Bleeker, 1856)	Freshwater demoiselle	
Neopomacentrus violascens (Bleeker, 1848)	Violet demoiselle	
Neopomacentrus xanthurus Allen and Randall, 1980	Red Sea demoiselle	
