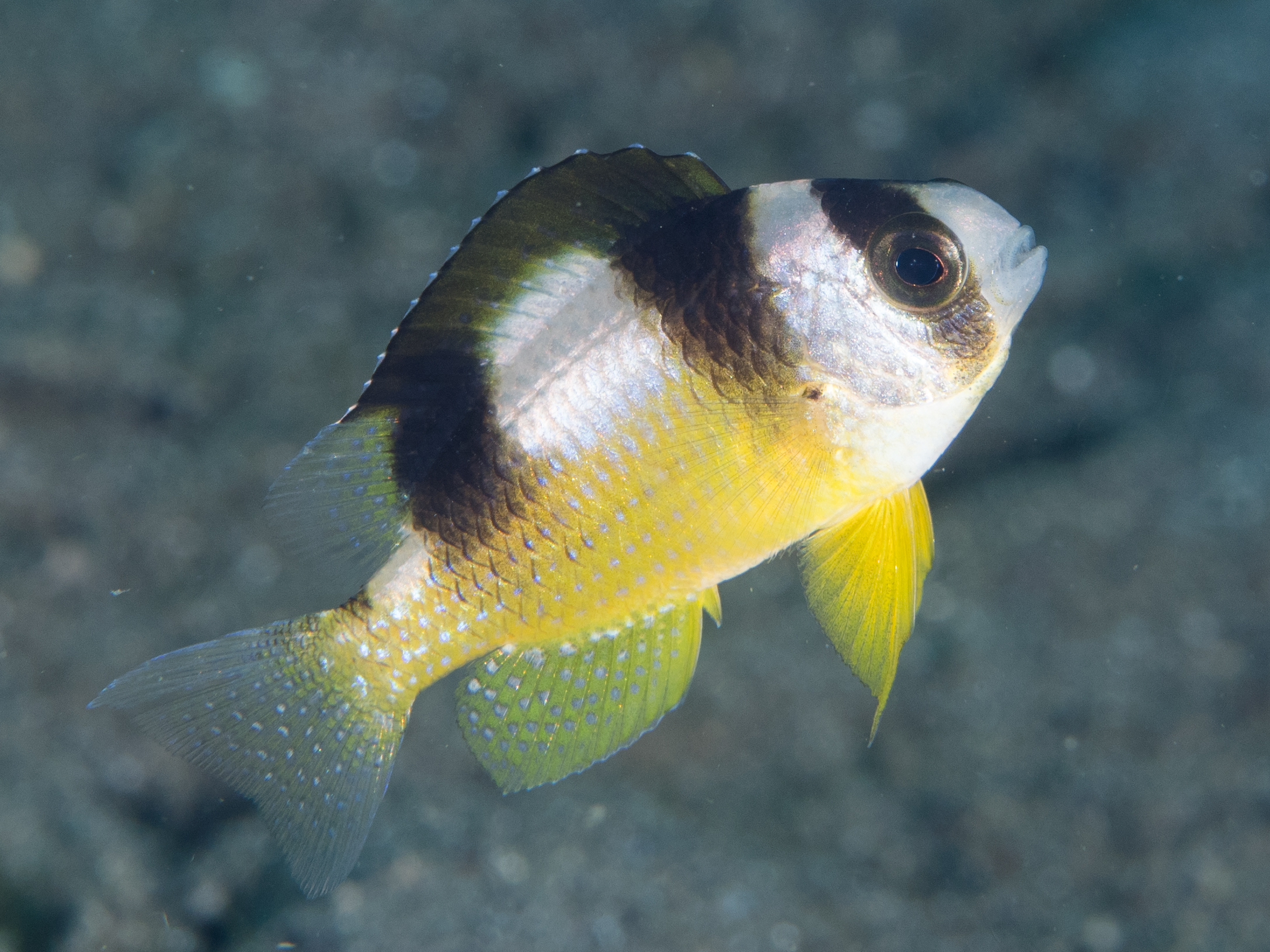
- Amblypomacentrus breviceps

Scientific classification
- Kingdom: Animalia
- Phylum: Chordata
- Class: Actinopterygii
- Order: Blenniiformes
- Family: Pomacentridae
- Subfamily: Pomacentrinae
- Genus: Amblypomacentrus; Bleeker, 1877

Type species
- Glyphisodon breviceps Schlegel & Müller, 1840

= Amblypomacentrus =

Genus of fishes

Amblypomacentrus is a small genus of ray-finned fish in the damselfish family Pomacentridae.

== Species ==
The following 6 species are currently placed in the genus:

Species	Common name	Image
Amblypomacentrus annulatus (Peters, 1855)		
Amblypomacentrus breviceps (Schlegel & Müller, 1840)	black-banded demoiselle	
Amblypomacentrus clarus Allen & Adrim, 2000		
Amblypomacentrus kuiteri (Allen & Rajasuriya, 1995)		
Amblypomacentrus tricinctus (Allen & Randall, 1974)		
Amblypomacentrus vietnamicus Prokofiev, 2004		
