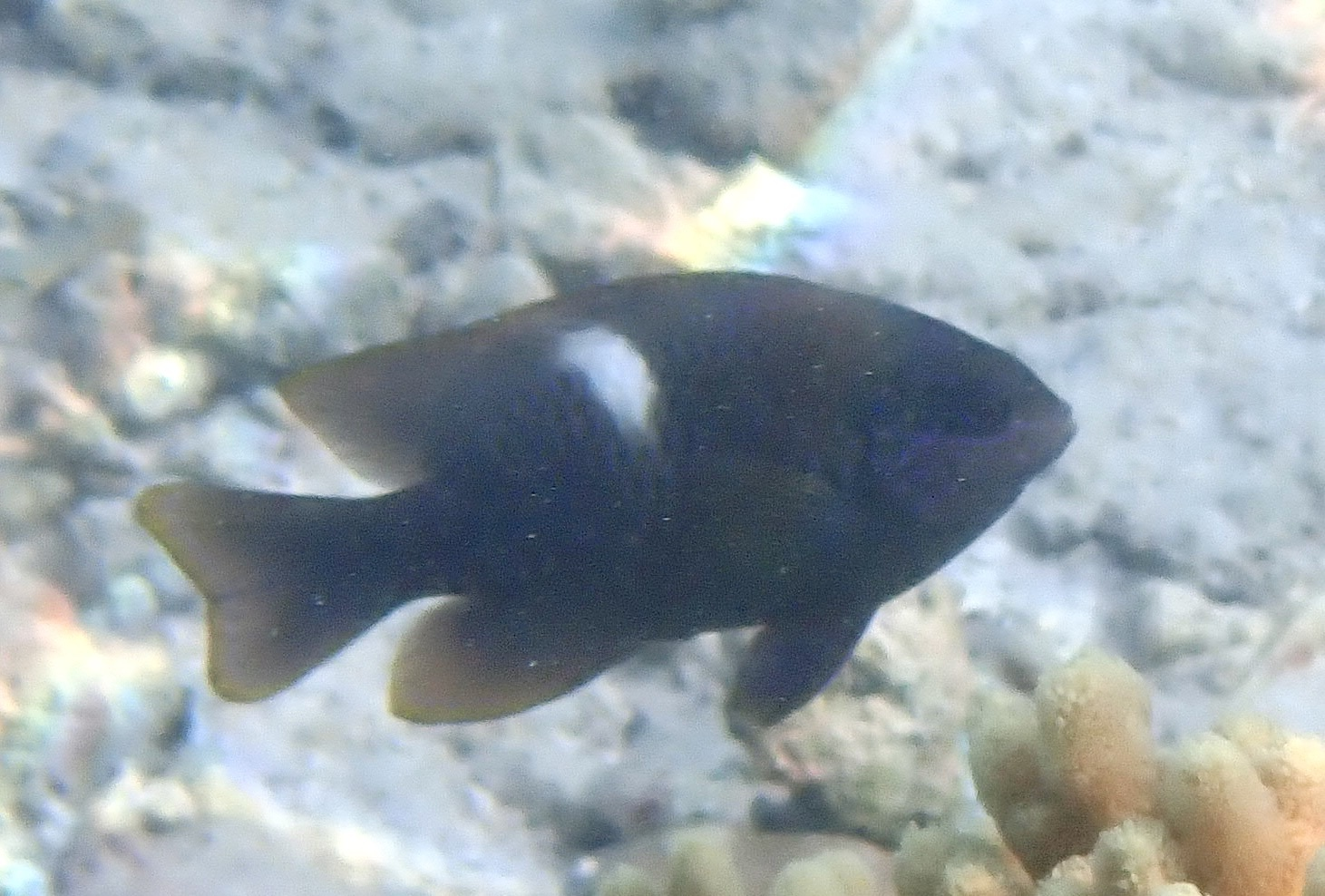

Conservation status
- Least Concern (IUCN 3.1)

Scientific classification
- Kingdom: Animalia
- Phylum: Chordata
- Class: Actinopterygii
- Order: Blenniiformes
- Family: Pomacentridae
- Genus: Dischistodus
- Species: D. pseudochrysopoecilus

Binomial name
- Dischistodus pseudochrysopoecilus (G. R. Allen & D. R. Robertson, 1974

Synonyms
- Pomacentrus pseudochrysopoecilus Allen & Robertson, 1974

= Dischistodus pseudochrysopoecilus =

Species of fish

Dischistodus pseudochrysopoecilus, commonly known as the monarch damsel, is a species of fish found in the western-central Pacific Ocean.

This species reaches a length of 18.0 cm (7.1 in).

== Gallery ==
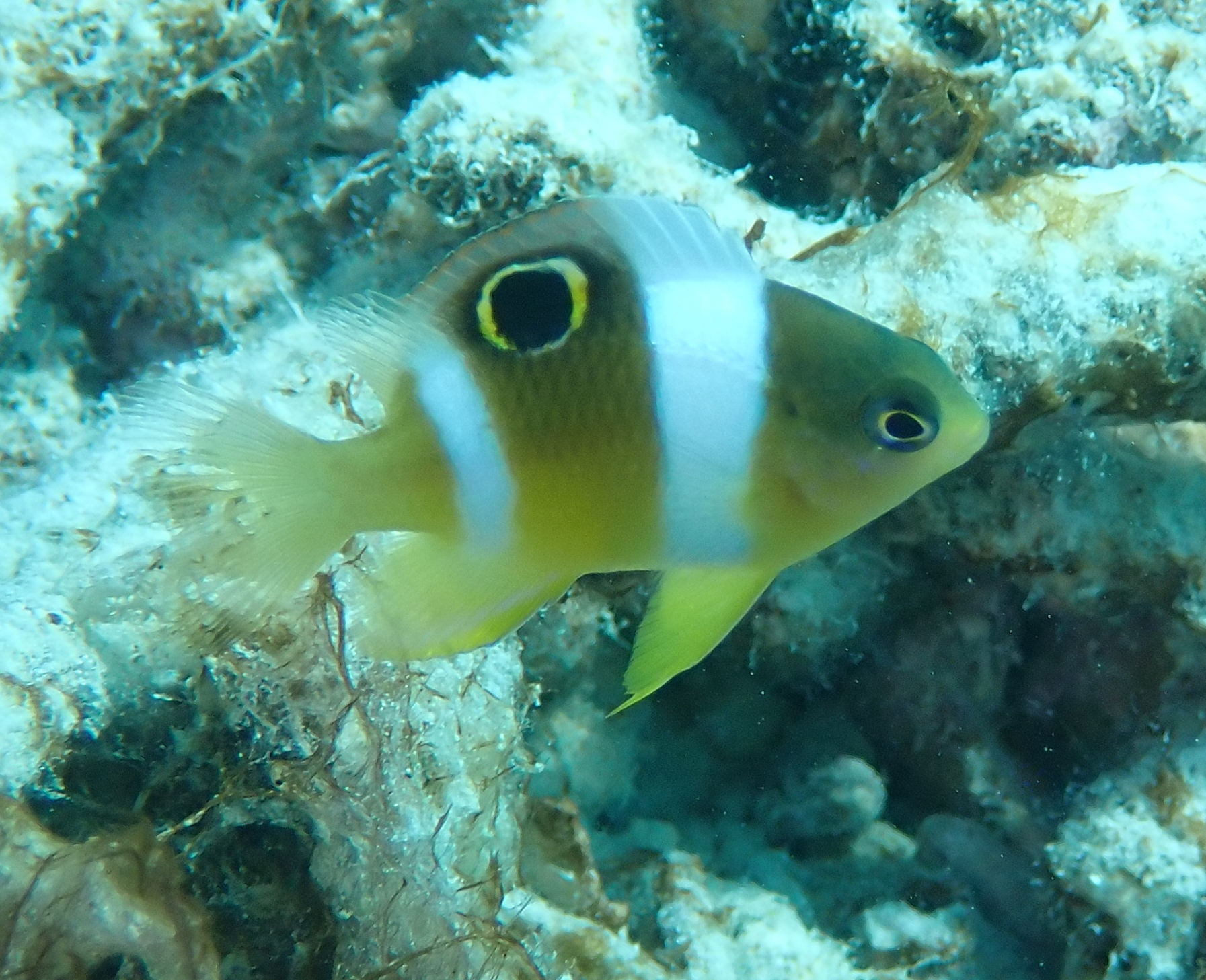
Juvenile

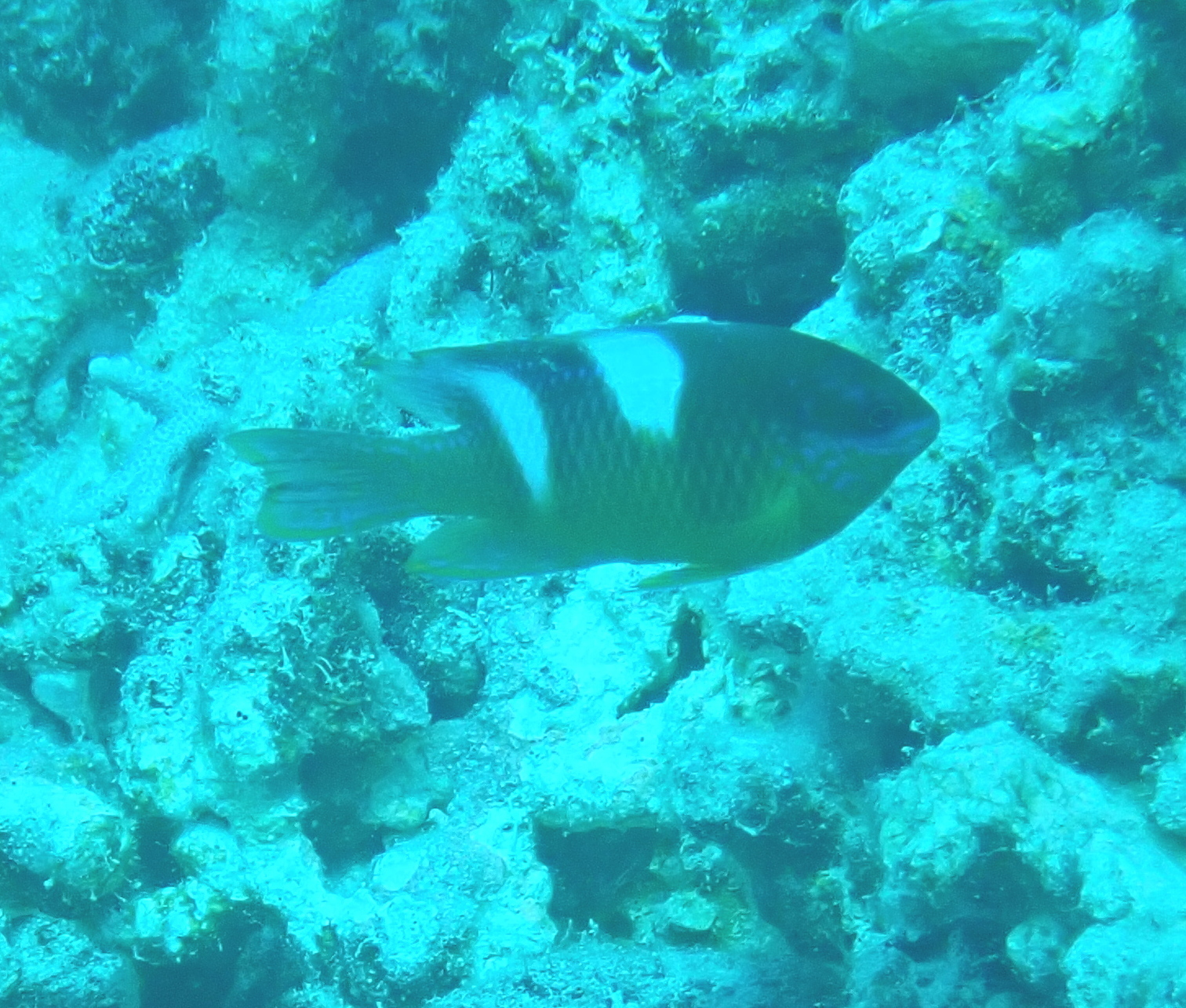
Juvenile
