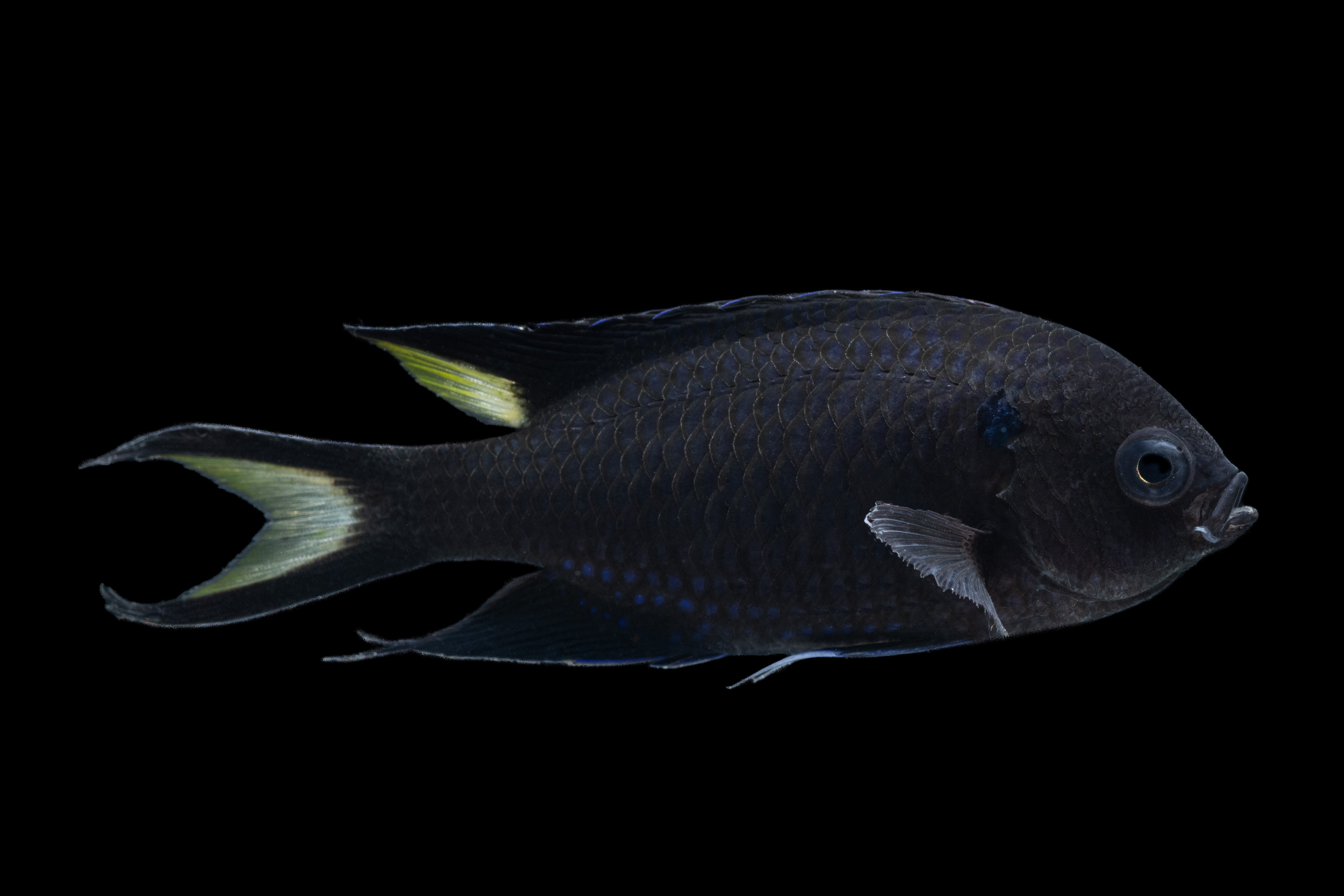

Conservation status
- Least Concern (IUCN 3.1)

Scientific classification
- Kingdom: Animalia
- Phylum: Chordata
- Class: Actinopterygii
- Order: Blenniiformes
- Family: Pomacentridae
- Genus: Neopomacentrus
- Species: N. cyanomos

Binomial name
- Neopomacentrus cyanomos (Bleeker, 1856)

Synonyms
- Pomacentrus cyanomos Bleeker, 1856; Pomacentrus leucosphyrus Fowler, 1904; Pomacentrus prateri Fowler, 1928

= Neopomacentrus cyanomos =

Species of fish

Neopomacentrus cyanomos, commonly known as the regal demoiselle, is a fish native to the Indo-Pacific region from the Persian Gulf, the Red Sea and the coastal waters of east Africa east to the Philippines, north to southern Japan, south to northern Australia and Melanesia. It has also been found as an invasive species in the Gulf of Mexico, off the Yucatan Peninsula, although how they arrived there is unknown.
