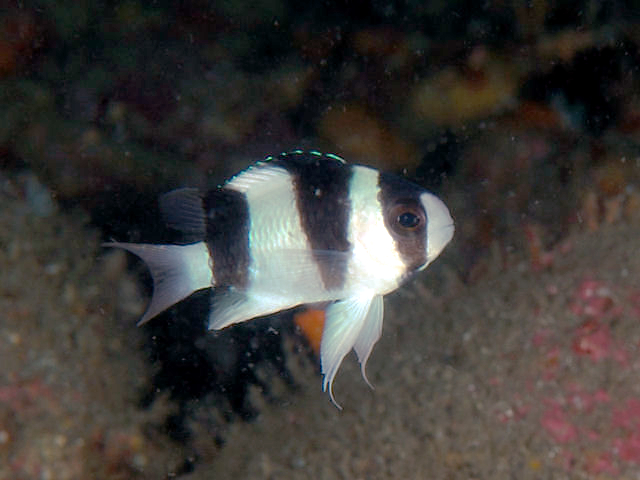

Conservation status
- Least Concern (IUCN 3.1)

Scientific classification
- Kingdom: Animalia
- Phylum: Chordata
- Class: Actinopterygii
- Order: Blenniiformes
- Family: Pomacentridae
- Genus: Amblypomacentrus
- Species: A. tricinctus

Binomial name
- Amblypomacentrus tricinctus (Allen & Randall, 1974)

Synonyms
- Glyphidodontops tricinctus Allen & Randall, 1974; Chrysiptera tricincta (Allen & Randall, 1974)

= Amblypomacentrus tricinctus =

Species of fish

Amblypomacentrus tricinctus, also known as the threeband damselfish and threeband demoiselle, is a species of damselfish in the family Pomacentridae. It is native to the western Pacific Ocean. It reaches about 6 centimeters in length. It has some commercial importance as an aquarium pet.
