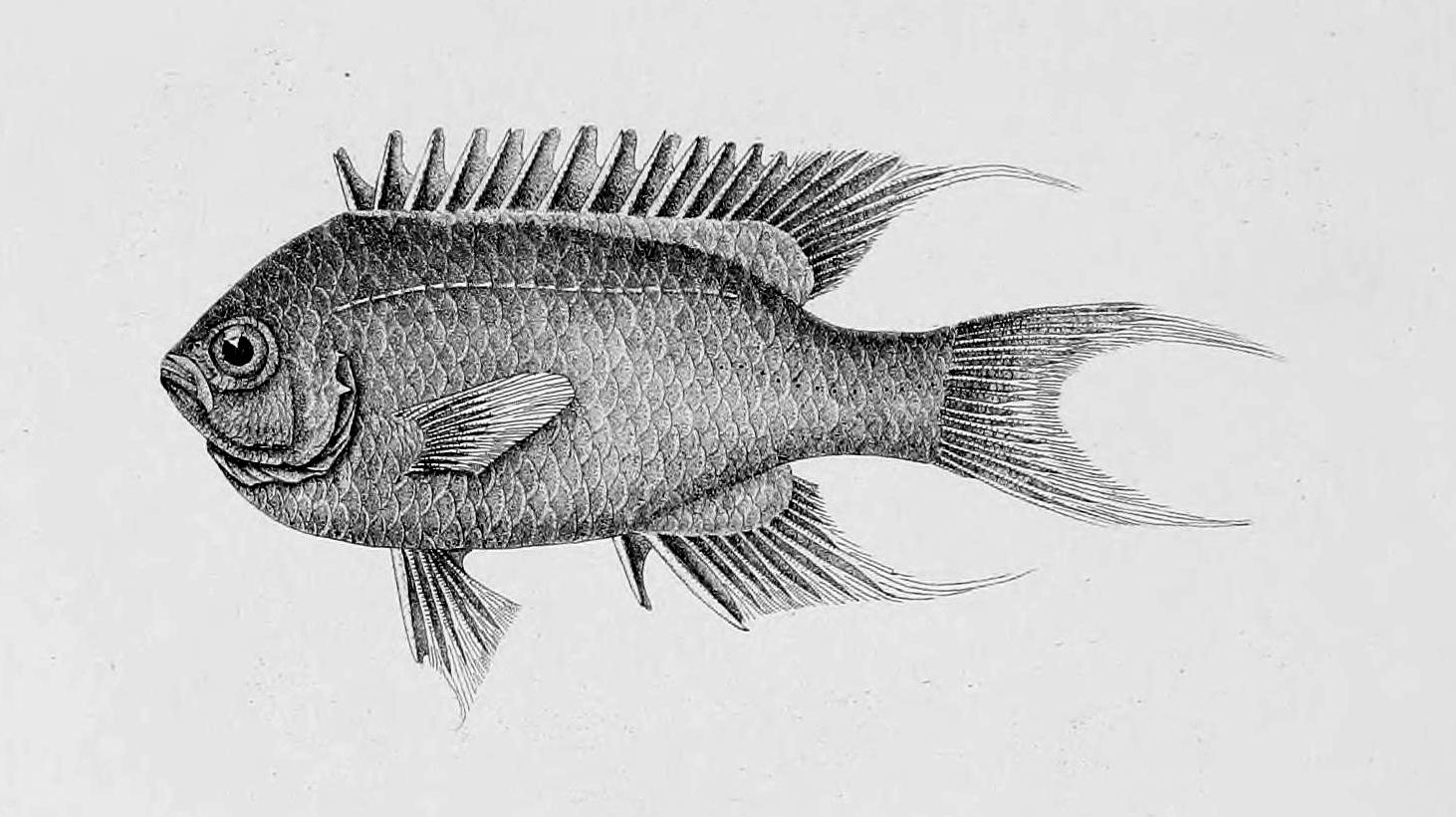

Conservation status
- Data Deficient (IUCN 3.1)

Scientific classification
- Kingdom: Animalia
- Phylum: Chordata
- Class: Actinopterygii
- Order: Blenniiformes
- Family: Pomacentridae
- Genus: Neopomacentrus
- Species: N. taeniurus

Binomial name
- Neopomacentrus taeniurus Bleeker, 1856

Synonyms
- Abudefduf cochinensis (Day, 1865); Glyphidodon fallax Peters, 1855; Glyphisodon amboinensis Bleeker, 1857; Glyphidodon cochinensis Day, 1865; Pomacentrus inhacae J. L. B. Smith, 1955; Pomacentrus rathbuni D.S. Jordan & Snyder, 1901; Pomacentrus taeniurus Bleeker, 1856

= Neopomacentrus taeniurus =

Species of fish

Neopomacentrus taeniurus (freshwater demoiselle or crescent damsel) is a brackish and marine species of damselfish found in the western and central Indo-Pacific. It can also be found in purely freshwater rivers in Mozambique.

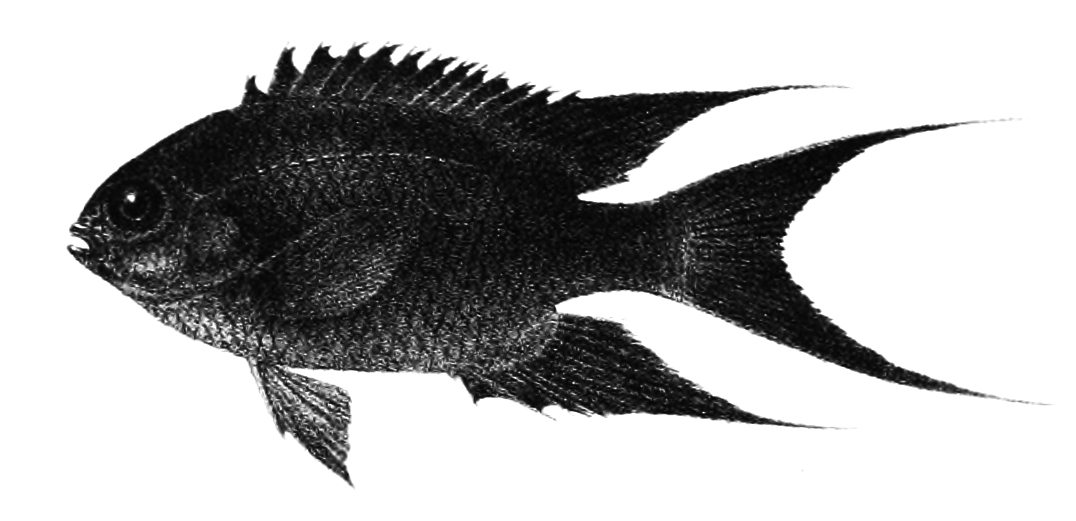
