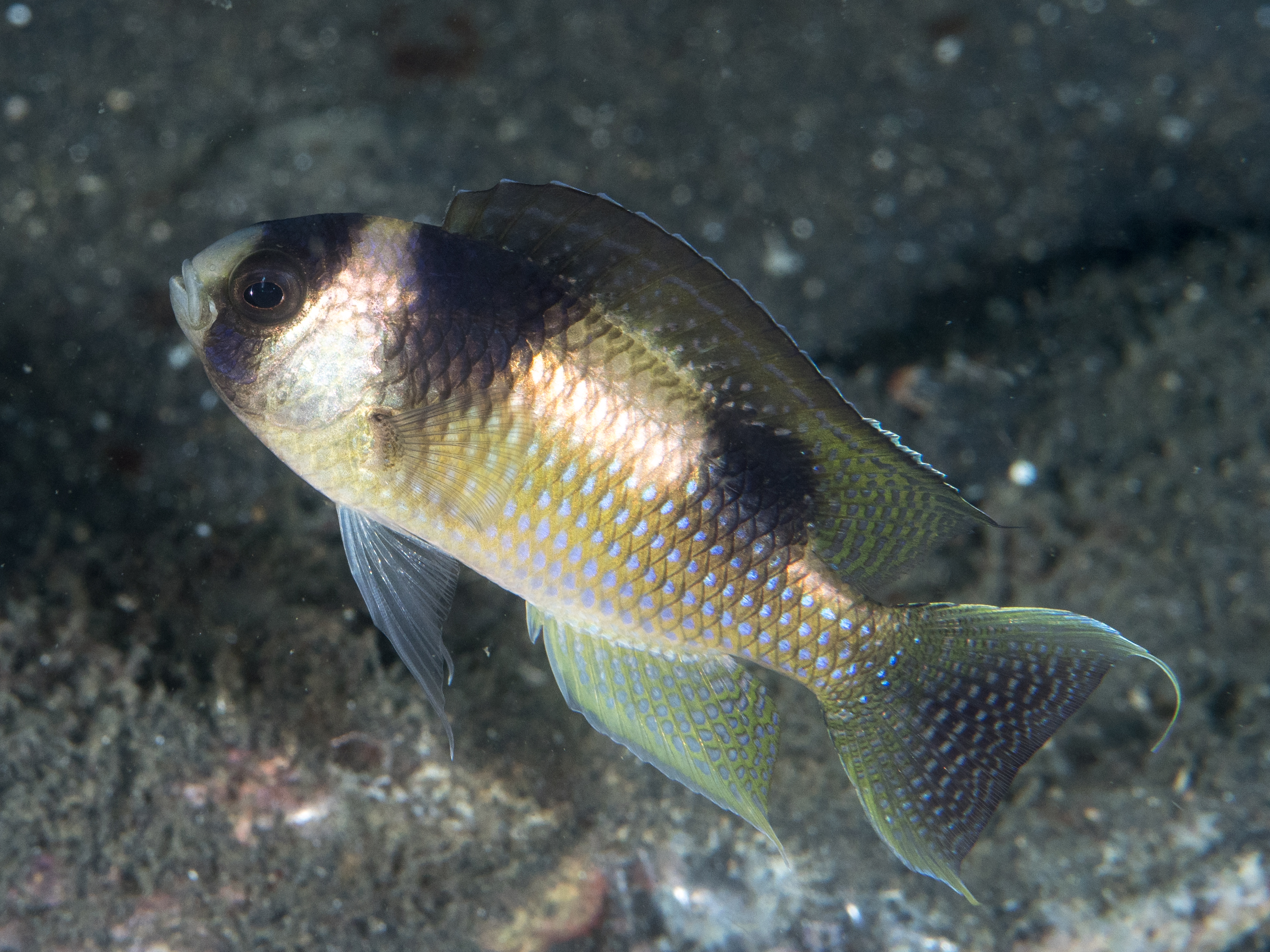

Conservation status
- Least Concern (IUCN 3.1)

Scientific classification
- Kingdom: Animalia
- Phylum: Chordata
- Class: Actinopterygii
- Order: Blenniiformes
- Family: Pomacentridae
- Genus: Amblypomacentrus
- Species: A. breviceps

Binomial name
- Amblypomacentrus breviceps (Schlegel & S. Müller, 1839)

Synonyms
- Glyphisodon breviceps Schlegel & Müller, 1839; Pomacentrus breviceps (Schlegel & Müller, 1839); Pristotis trifasciatus Bleeker, 1848; Pomacentrus trifasciatus (Bleeker, 1848); Pomacentrus nematopterus Bleeker, 1852; Pomacentrus beauforti Fowler & B.A. Bean, 1928

= Amblypomacentrus breviceps =

Species of fish

Amblypomacentrus breviceps, known commonly as the black-banded demoiselle , is a species of marine fish in the family Pomacentridae, the damselfishes and the clownfishes.

== Distribution and habitat ==
It is widespread throughout the tropical waters of the western Pacific Ocean.

== Description ==
It's a small size fish that can reach a maximum size of 8,5 cm length.

== Gallery ==
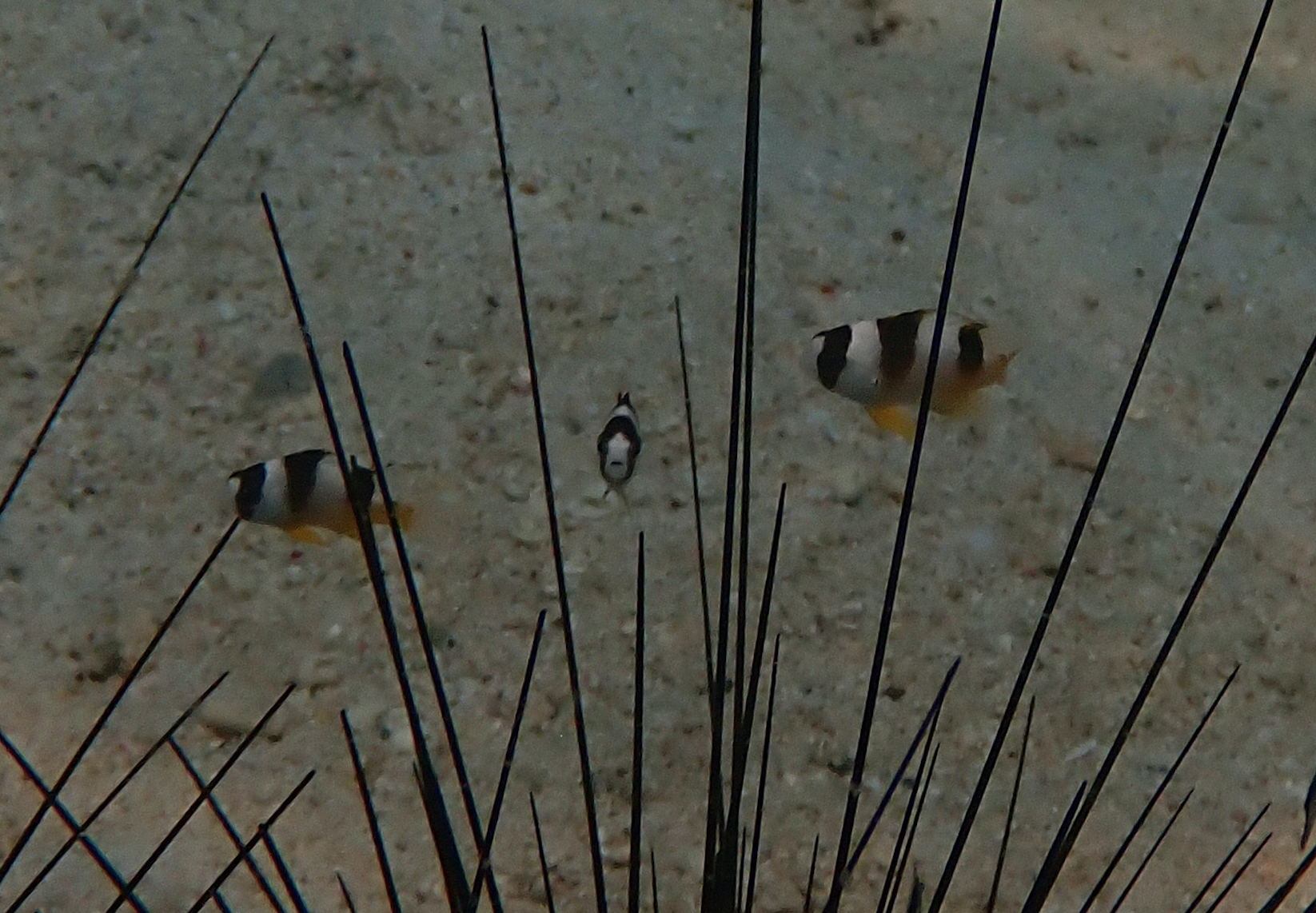
Juveniles among Diadema setosum spines

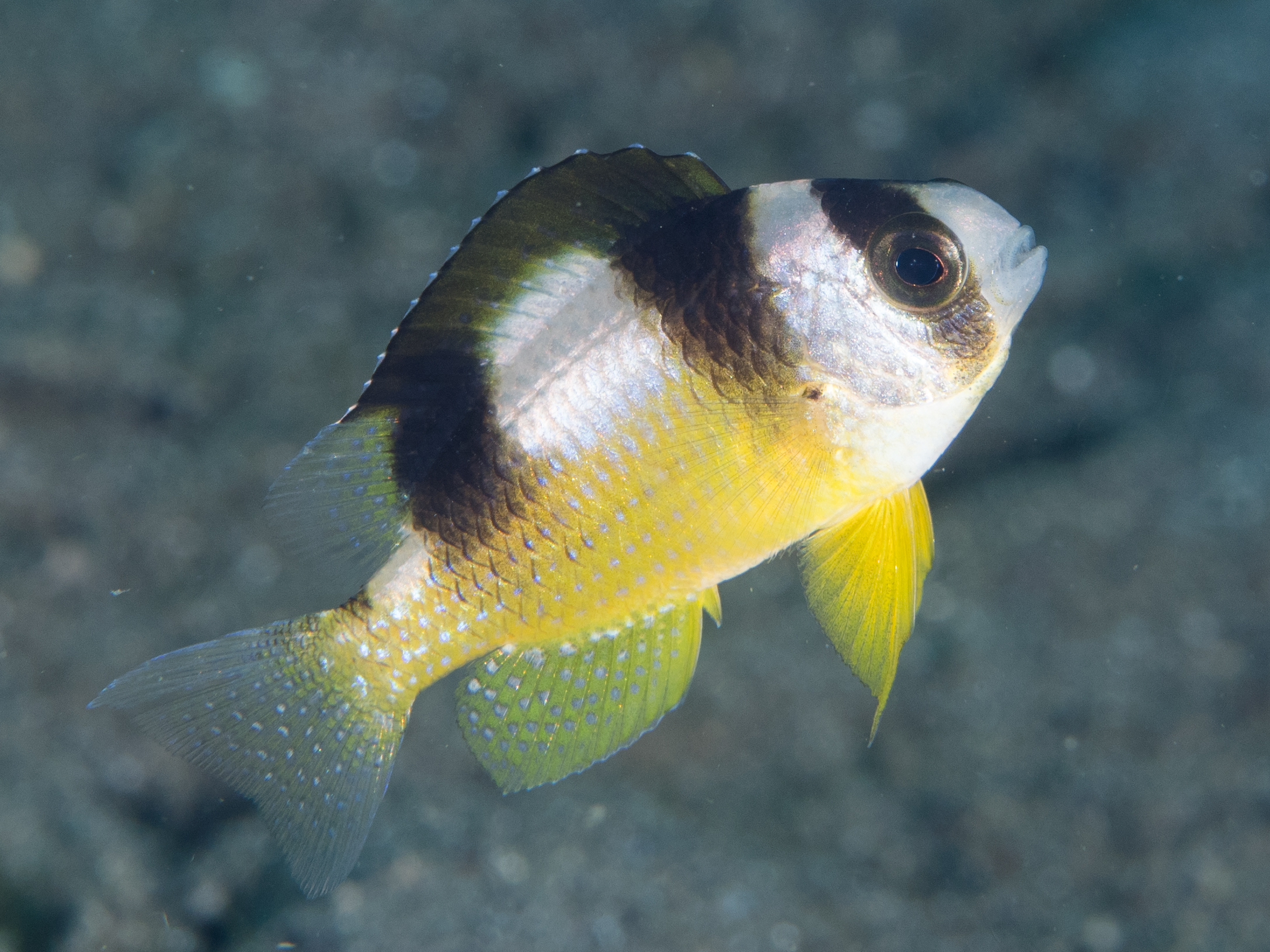
In Indonesia

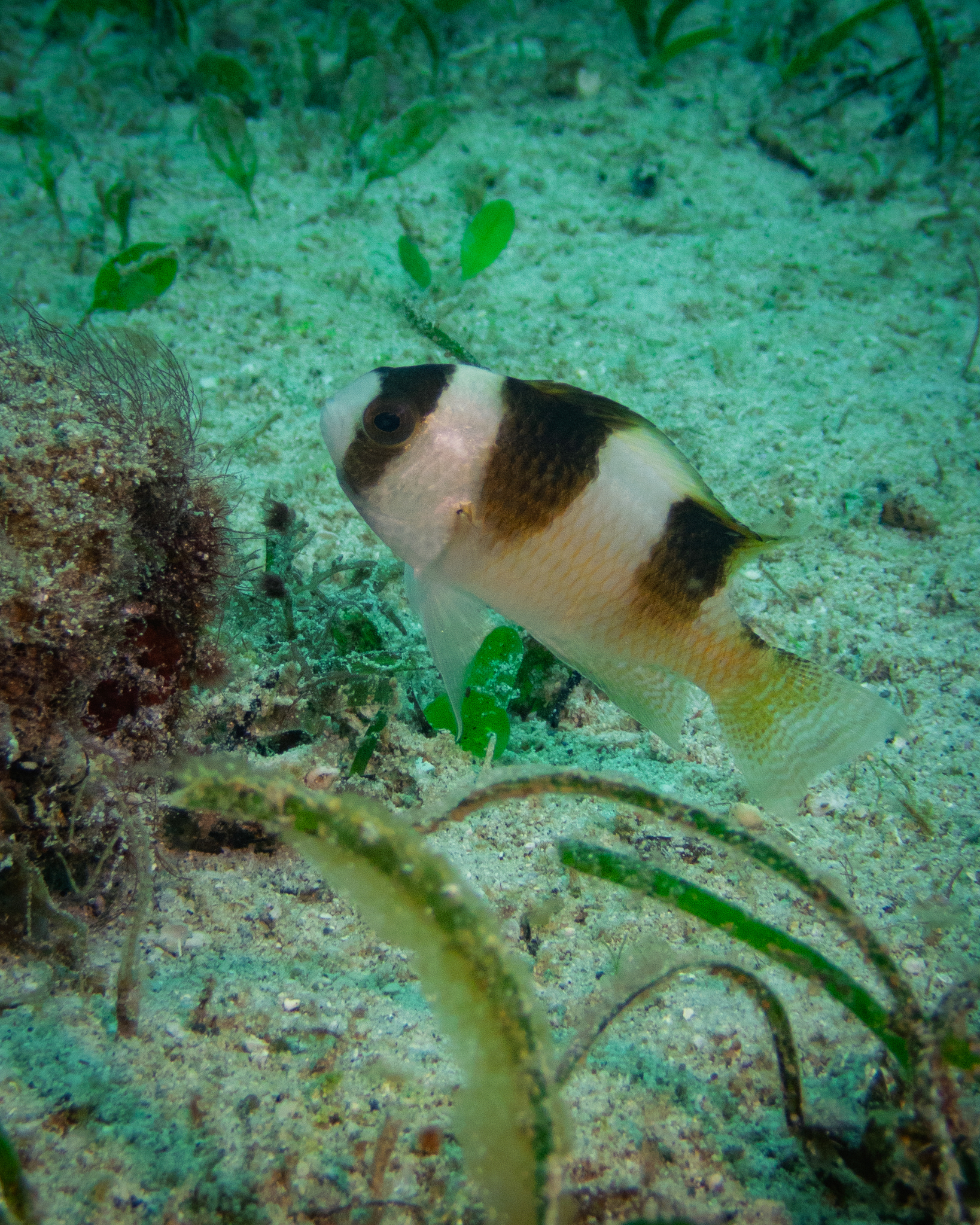
In the Philippines
