= Pomacentrus novaeguineae =

Scientific classification
- Domain: Eukaryota
- Kingdom: Animalia
- Phylum: Chordata
- Class: Actinopterygii
- Order: Blenniiformes
- Family: Pomacentridae
- Genus: Pomacentrus
- Species: P. novaeguineae

Binomial name
- Pomacentrus novaeguineae G. R. Allen, Erdmann and Pertiwi, 2022

Species of fish

Pomacentrus novaeguineae is a species of damselfish similar to Philippine damselfish (Pomacentrus philippinus) and Pomacentrus xanthocercus. It was described from coral reefs in Milne Bay Province, Papua New Guinea. Its native range is from West Papua, Indonesia, Papua New Guinea to the Solomon Islands.
