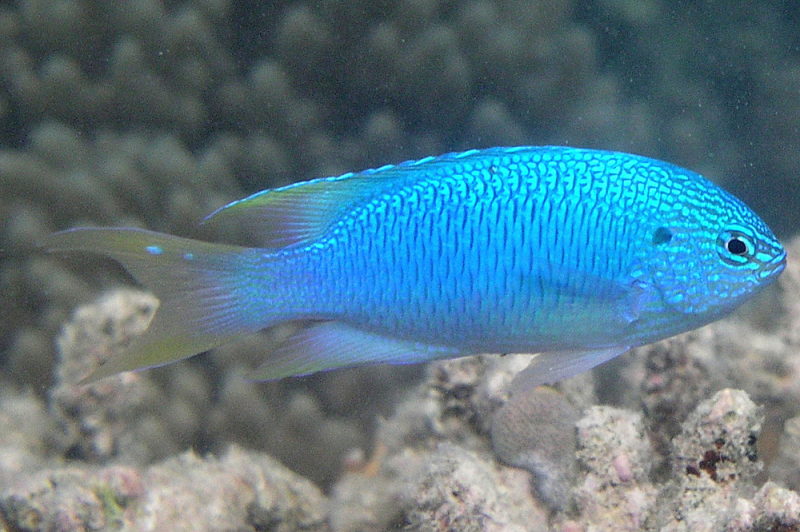
- Pomacentrus pavo

Scientific classification
- Kingdom: Animalia
- Phylum: Chordata
- Class: Actinopterygii
- Division: Teleostei
- Order: Blenniiformes
- Family: Pomacentridae
- Subfamily: Pomacentrinae
- Genus: Pomacentrus; Lacépède, 1802

Type species
- Pomacentrus pavo Bloch, 1787

Species
- 76, see text.

Synonyms
- Lepidopomacentrus Allen, 1975; Omopomacentrus Fowler, 1944; Parapomacentrus Bleeker, 1877; Pseudopomacentrus Bleeker, 1877

= Pomacentrus =

Genus of fishes

Pomacentrus is a genus of marine damselfish in the family Pomacentridae. These fish inhabit tropical locations and are often captured or bred as aquarium fish.

== Species ==
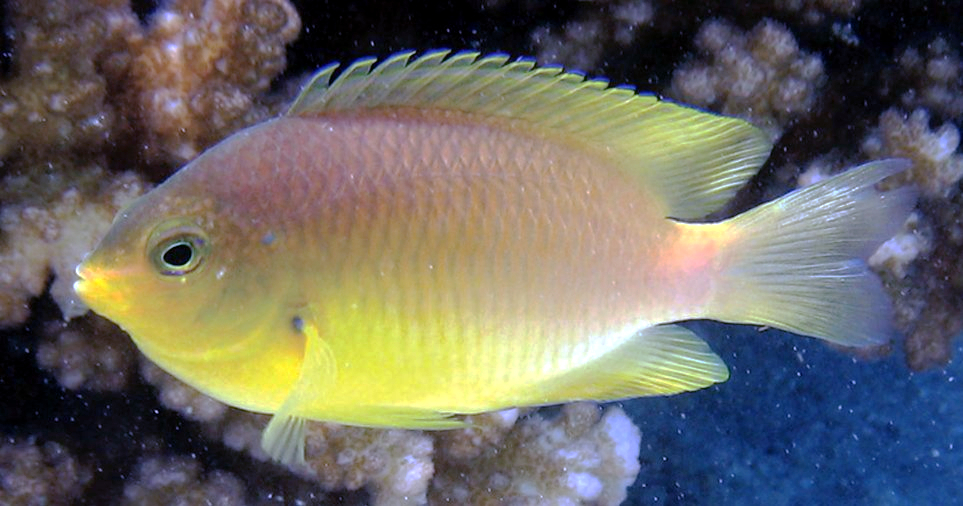
Pomacentrus amboinensis

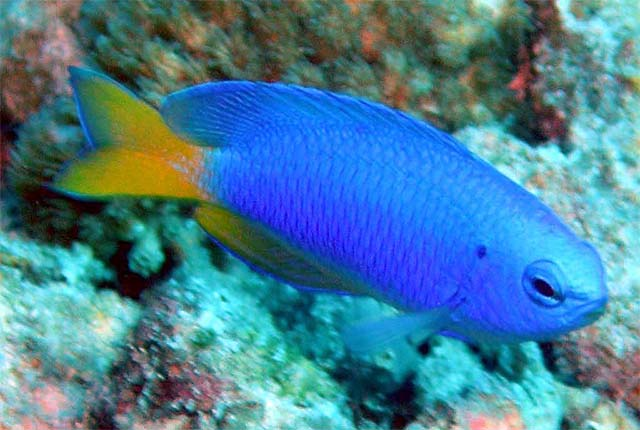
Pomacentrus auriventris

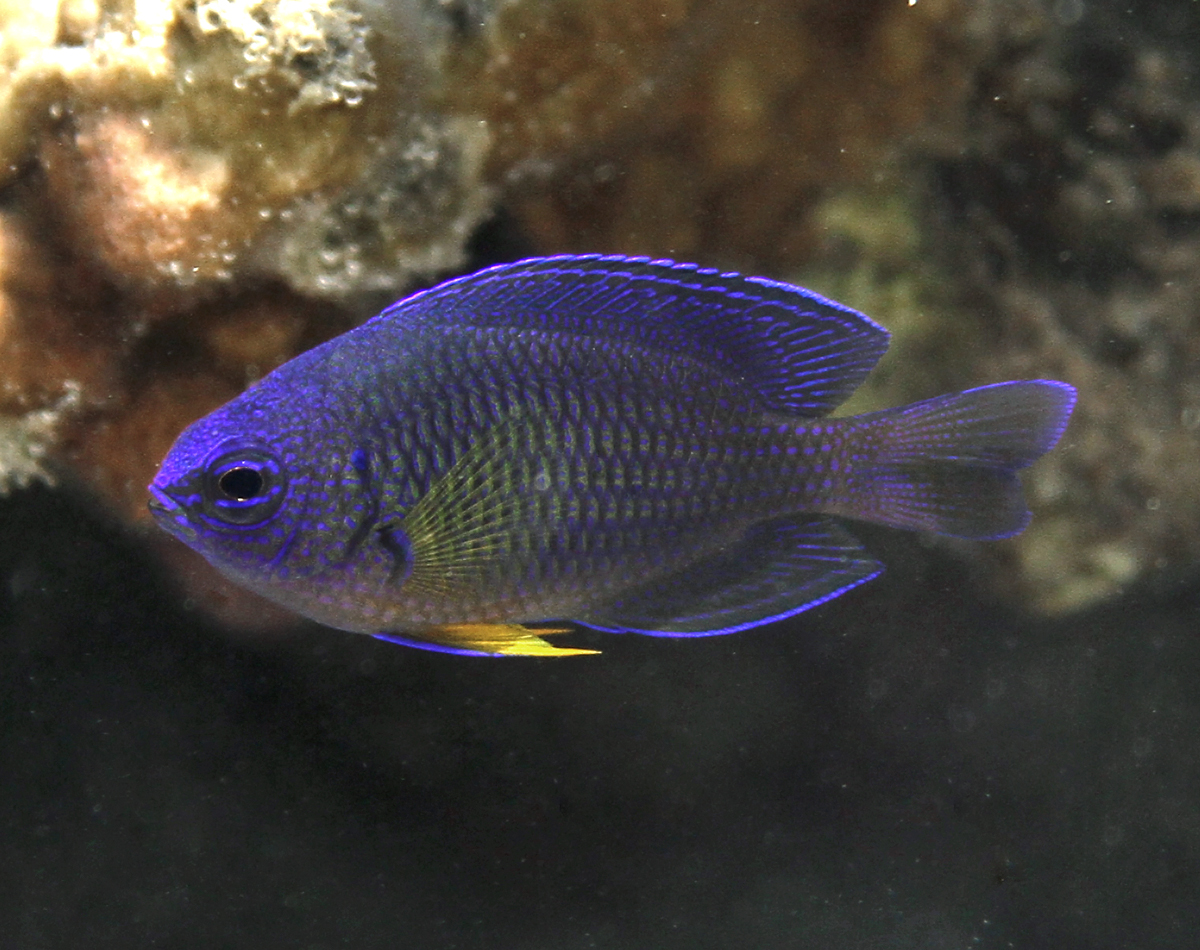
Pomacentrus caeruleopunctatus

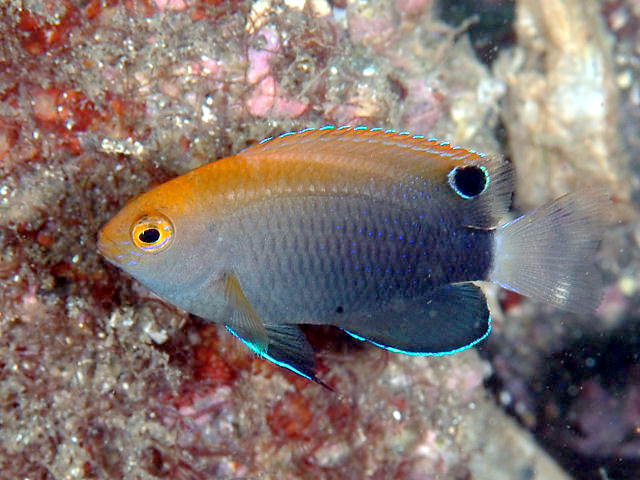
Pomacentrus chrysurus

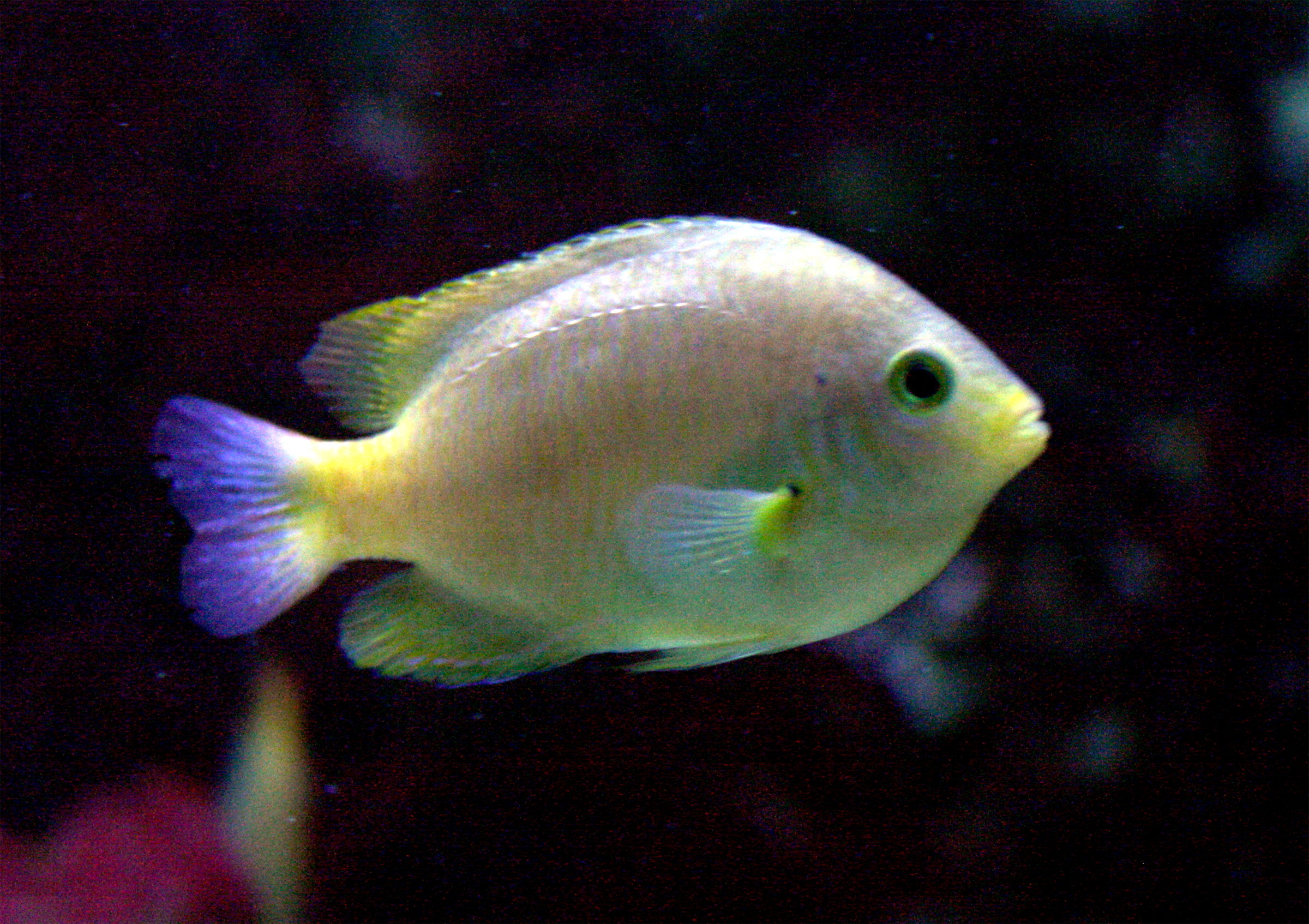
Pomacentrus moluccensis

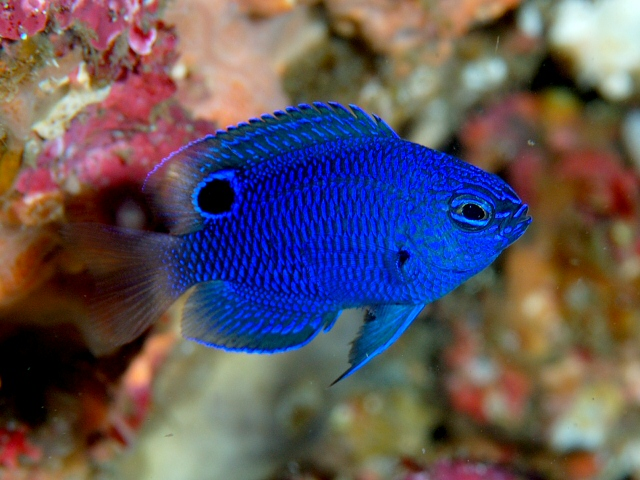
Pomacentrus nagasakiensis

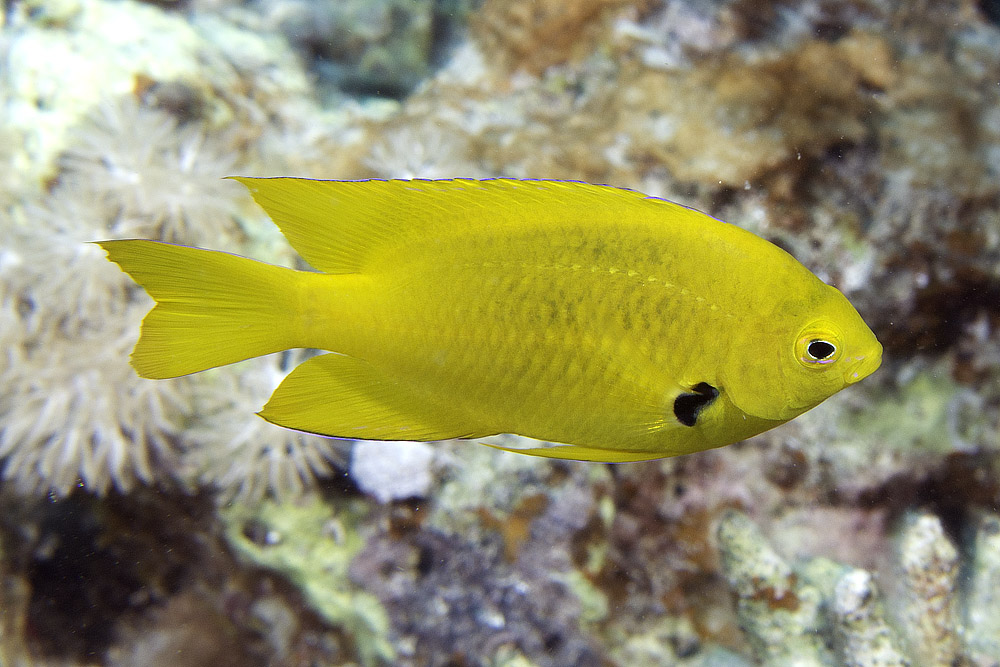
Pomacentrus sulfureus

These are the current recognized species in this genus:

- Pomacentrus adelus G. R. Allen, 1991 (Obscure damsel)
- Pomacentrus agassizii Bliss, 1883 (Creole damsel)
- Pomacentrus albicaudatus Baschieri-Salvadori, 1955 (Whitefin damsel)
- Pomacentrus albimaculus G. R. Allen, 1975 (Whitespot damsel)
- Pomacentrus alexanderae Evermann & Seale, 1907 (Alexander's damsel)
- Pomacentrus alleni W.E. Burgess, 1981 (Andaman damsel)
- Pomacentrus amboinensis Bleeker, 1868 (Ambon damsel)
- Pomacentrus andamanensis Gerald R. Allen, Mark V. Erdmann & Enex Y. Ningsih, 2020
- Pomacentrus aquilus G. R. Allen & J. E. Randall, 1980 (Dark damsel)
- Pomacentrus arabicus G. R. Allen, 1991 (Arabian damsel)
- Pomacentrus armillatus G. R. Allen, 1993 (Bracelet damselfish)
- Pomacentrus atriaxillaris G. R. Allen, 2002
- Pomacentrus aurifrons G. R. Allen, 2004 (Yellowhead damselfish)
- Pomacentrus auriventris G. R. Allen, 1991 (Goldbelly damsel)
- Pomacentrus australis G. R. Allen & D. R. Robertson, 1974 (Australian damsel)
- Pomacentrus azuremaculatus G. R. Allen, 1991 (Bluespotted damsel)
- Pomacentrus baenschi G. R. Allen, 1991 (Baensch's damsel)
- Pomacentrus bangladeshius Habib, Islam, Nahar & Neogi, 2020
- Pomacentrus bankanensis Bleeker, 1854 (Speckled damselfish)
- Pomacentrus bellipictus Allen, Erdmann & Hidayat, 2018
- Pomacentrus bintanensis G. R. Allen, 1999 (Bintan damselfish)
- Pomacentrus bipunctatus G. R. Allen & J. E. Randall, 2004
- Pomacentrus brachialis G. Cuvier, 1830 (Charcoal damsel)
- Pomacentrus burroughi Fowler, 1918 (Burrough's damsel)
- Pomacentrus caeruleopunctatus G. R. Allen, 2002
- Pomacentrus caeruleus Quoy & Gaimard, 1825 (Caerulean damsel)
- Pomacentrus callainus J. E. Randall, 2002
- Pomacentrus cheraphilus G. R. Allen, Erdmann & Hilomen, 2011
- Pomacentrus chrysurus G. Cuvier, 1830 (Whitetail damsel)
- Pomacentrus coelestis D. S. Jordan & Starks, 1901 (Neon damselfish)
- Pomacentrus colini G. R. Allen, 1991 (Colin's damsel)
- Pomacentrus cuneatus G. R. Allen, 1991 (Wedgespot damsel)
- Pomacentrus emarginatus G. Cuvier, 1829 (Outer-reef damsel)
- Pomacentrus fakfakensis G. R. Allen & Erdmann, 2009 (Fakfak damselfish)
- Pomacentrus geminospilus G. R. Allen, 1993 (Sabah damsel)
- Pomacentrus grammorhynchus Fowler, 1918 (Bluespot damsel)
- Pomacentrus imitator Whitley, 1964 (Imitator damsel)
- Pomacentrus indicus G. R. Allen, 1991 (Indian damsel)
- Pomacentrus javanicus G. R. Allen, 1991 (Java damsel)
- Pomacentrus komodoensis G. R. Allen, 1999 (Komodo damselfish)
- Pomacentrus lepidogenys Fowler & B. A. Bean, 1928 (Scaly damsel)
- Pomacentrus leptus G. R. Allen & J. E. Randall, 1980 (Slender damsel)
- Pomacentrus limosus G. R. Allen, 1992 (Muddy damsel)
- Pomacentrus littoralis G. Cuvier, 1830 (Smoky damsel)
- Pomacentrus maafu G. R. Allen & Drew, 2012
- Pomacentrus melanochir Bleeker, 1877 (Indonesian damsel)
- Pomacentrus micronesicus S. Y. Liu, H. C. Ho & C. F. Dai, 2014 (Micronesian damselfish)
- Pomacentrus microspilus G. R. Allen & J. E. Randall, 2005
- Pomacentrus milleri L. R. Taylor, 1964 (Miller's damselfish)
- Pomacentrus moluccensis Bleeker, 1853 (Lemon damsel)
- Pomacentrus nagasakiensis S. Tanaka (I), 1917 (Nagasaki damsel)
- Pomacentrus nigromanus M. C. W. Weber, 1913 (Goldback damsel)
- Pomacentrus nigromarginatus G. R. Allen, 1973 (Blackmargined damsel)
- Pomacentrus novaeguineae Gerald R. Allen, Mark V. Erdmann and Ni Putu Dian Pertiwi, 2022 (Honeytail damsel)
- Pomacentrus opisthostigma Fowler, 1918 (Brown damsel)
- Pomacentrus pavo Bloch, 1787 (Sapphire damsel)
- Pomacentrus philippinus Evermann & Seale, 1907 (Philippine damsel)
- Pomacentrus pikei Bliss, 1883 (Blacklip damsel)
- Pomacentrus polyspinus G. R. Allen, 1991 (Thai damsel)
- Pomacentrus proteus G. R. Allen, 1991 (Colombo damsel)
- Pomacentrus reidi Fowler & B. A. Bean, 1928 (Reid's damsel)
- Pomacentrus rodriguesensis G. R. Allen & J. E. Wright, 2003
- Pomacentrus saksonoi G. R. Allen, 1995 (Anton's damsel)
- Pomacentrus similis G. R. Allen, 1991 (Similar damsel)
- Pomacentrus simsiang Bleeker, 1856 (Blueback damsel)
- Pomacentrus smithi Fowler & B. A. Bean, 1928 (Smith's damsel)
- Pomacentrus spilotoceps J. E. Randall, 2002
- Pomacentrus stigma Fowler & B. A. Bean, 1928 (Blackspot damsel)
- Pomacentrus sulfureus Klunzinger, 1871 (Sulphur damsel)
- Pomacentrus taeniometopon Bleeker, 1852 (Brackish damsel)
- Pomacentrus trichrourus Günther, 1867 (Paletail damsel)
- Pomacentrus trilineatus G. Cuvier, 1830 (Threeline damsel)
- Pomacentrus tripunctatus G. Cuvier, 1830 (Threespot damsel)
- Pomacentrus umbratilus Gerald R. Allen, Mark V. Erdmann and Ni Putu Dian Pertiwi, 2022 (Shade damsel)
- Pomacentrus vaiuli D. S. Jordan & Seale, 1906 (Ocellate damselfish)
- Pomacentrus vatosoa Frable & Tea, 2019
- Pomacentrus wardi Whitley, 1927 (Ward's damsel)
- Pomacentrus xanthocercus Gerald R. Allen, Mark V. Erdmann and Ni Putu Dian Pertiwi, 2022 (Atoll damsel)
- Pomacentrus xanthosternus G. R. Allen, 1991 (Yellowbreasted damsel)
- Pomacentrus yoshii G. R. Allen & J. E. Randall, 2004

== See also ==
- Damselfish
