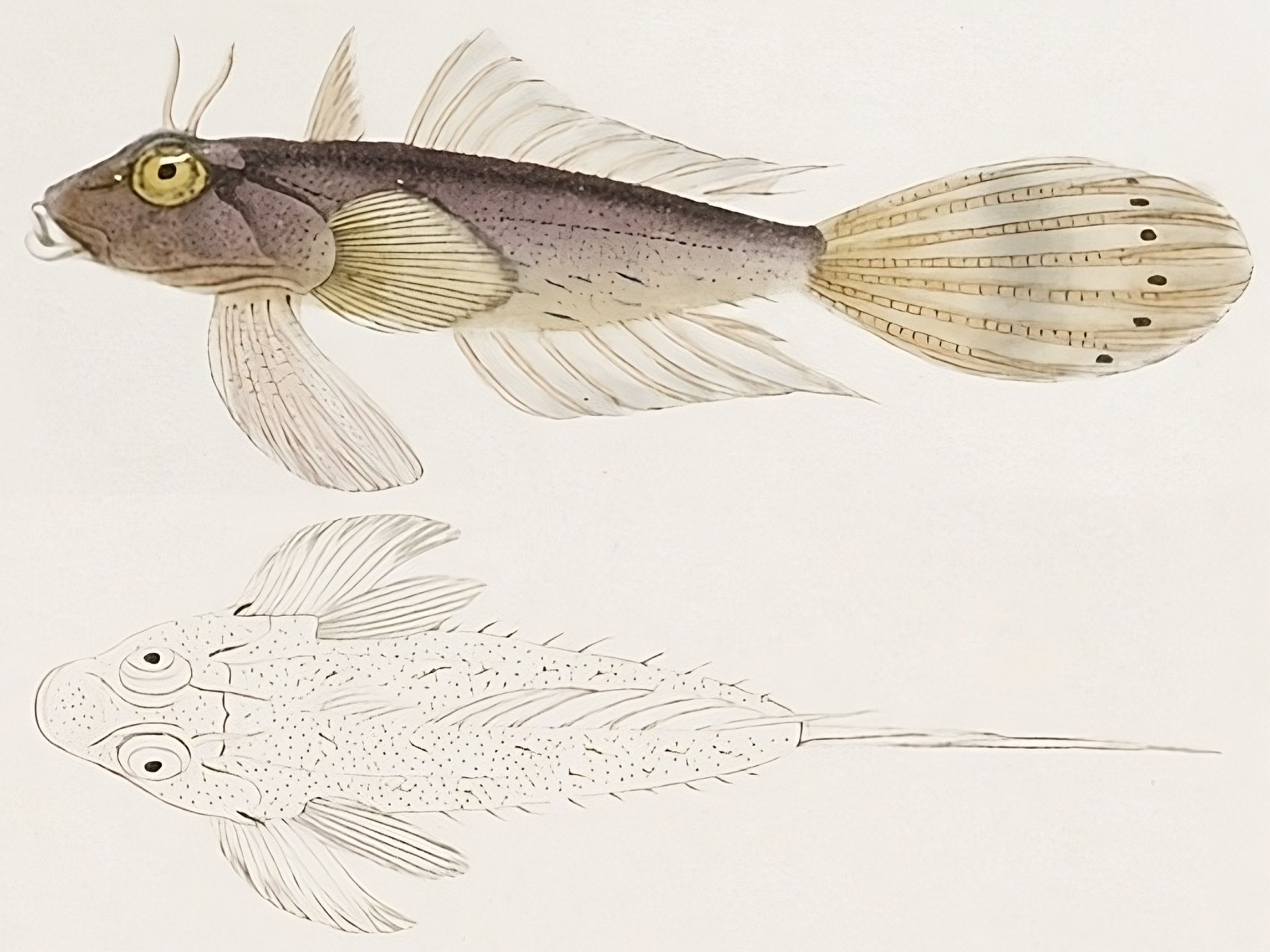

Conservation status
- Least Concern (IUCN 3.1)

Scientific classification
- Kingdom: Animalia
- Phylum: Chordata
- Class: Actinopterygii
- Division: Teleostei
- Order: Syngnathiformes
- Family: Callionymidae
- Genus: Anaora; J. E. Gray, 1835
- Species: A. tentaculata

Binomial name
- Anaora tentaculata J. E. Gray, 1835

Synonyms
- Callionymus inversicoloratus Seale, 1910; Synchiropus tentaculatus Herre, 1928; Callionymus fimbriatus Herre, 1934; Anaora fowleri Herre, 1953

= Tentacled dragonet =

Species of fish

The tentacled dragonet (Anaora tentaculata) is a species of dragonet native to tropical reefs in the western Pacific Ocean.

== Description ==
The tentacled dragonet reaches a maximum length of 6 centimetres (2.4 in) TL. The fish has 4 dorsal spines, 8 dorsal soft rays, no anal spines, 7 anal soft rays. It is commonly identified by "moderately long tentacle behind the eye and numerous small leafy appendages on the body".

== Distribution and habitat ==
The Tentacled dragonet is a marine fish that inhabits the sandy regions of shallow reefs from tide pools to as deep as 30 metres (98 ft). The tentacled dragonet also inhabits sheltered algae reef lagoons, usually in on near seagrass beds. It is distributed in the Western Pacific: Moluccas, Philippines, Ryukyu Islands, Palau, Yap, and Guam.
