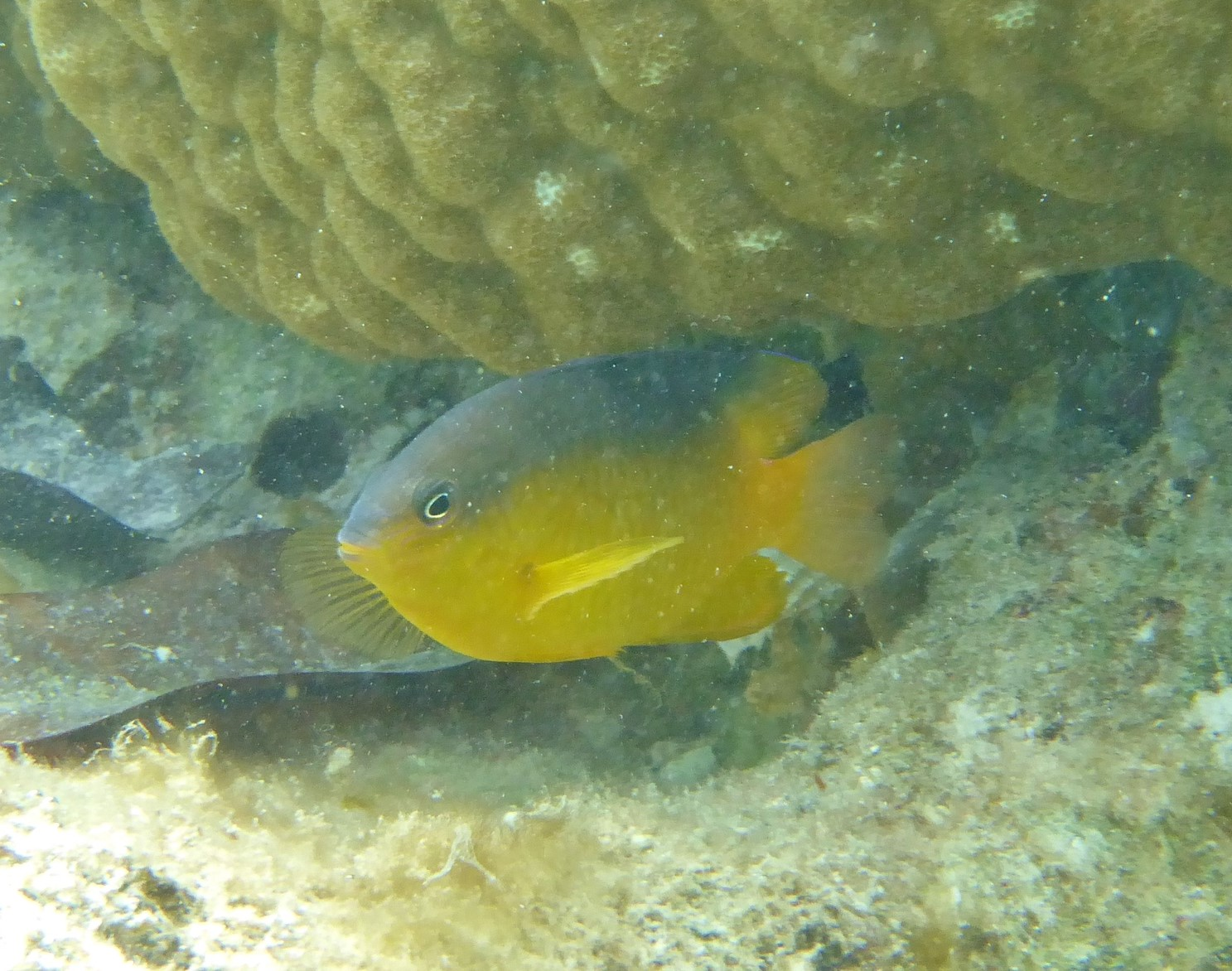

Conservation status
- Least Concern (IUCN 3.1)

Scientific classification
- Kingdom: Animalia
- Phylum: Chordata
- Class: Actinopterygii
- Order: Blenniiformes
- Family: Pomacentridae
- Genus: Pomacentrus
- Species: P. simsiang

Binomial name
- Pomacentrus simsiang Bleeker, 1856

Synonyms
- Pomacentrus tropicus Seale, 1910; Pomacentrus hebardi Fowler, 1918

= Pomacentrus simsiang =

Species of fish

Pomacentrus simsiang, the blueback damsel, is a damselfish from the Indo-West Pacific. It occasionally makes its way into the aquarium trade. It grows to a size of 7 cm in length.
