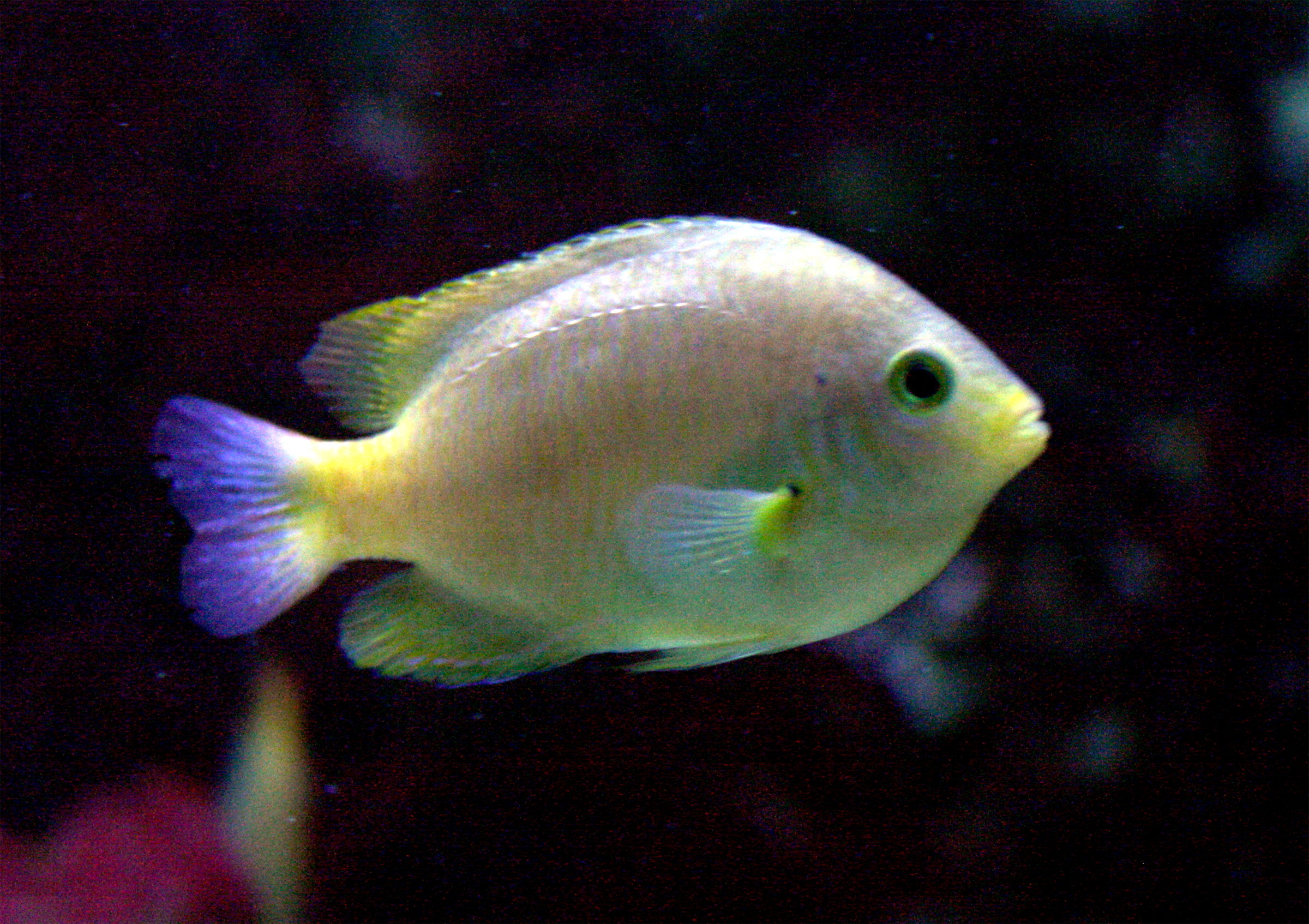

Conservation status
- Least Concern (IUCN 3.1)

Scientific classification
- Kingdom: Animalia
- Phylum: Chordata
- Class: Actinopterygii
- Order: Blenniiformes
- Family: Pomacentridae
- Genus: Pomacentrus
- Species: P. moluccensis

Binomial name
- Pomacentrus moluccensis Bleeker, 1853

Synonyms
- Pomacentrus popei Evermann & Seale, 1907; Pomacentrus sufflavus Whitley, 1927

= Pomacentrus moluccensis =

Species of fish

Pomacentrus moluccensis, the lemon damselfish, is a species of bony fish in the family Pomacentridae, from the Western Pacific Ocean. It occasionally makes its way into the aquarium trade. It grows to a size of 9 cm (4 in) in length.

== Description ==
Pomacentrus moluccensis is a deep-bodied, laterally-compressed fish, growing to a length of about 9 cm (4 in). The head is slightly longer than it is high, with a large eye and oblique mouth. The teeth are in two series and have rounded tips. The dorsal fin has 13 spines and 13 to 14 soft rays. The anal fin has 2 spines and 14 soft rays; the first anal spine is half the size of the second. The first ray of the pelvic fins is much elongated, and is longer than the head. The pectoral fins are rather shorter, and the caudal fin is shallowly forked with rounded lobes. The colour of this fish is a uniform yellow, and there is a small orange spot at the base of the pectoral fin (except for fish in the Philippines).

== Distribution and habitat ==
Pomacentrus moluccensis is native to the tropical western Pacific Ocean. Its range extends from about 32°N to 32°S, and 92°E to 173°W. It is found down to about 14 m (46 ft) in clear-water lagoons and in reefs with branching corals to provide hiding places.

== Ecology ==
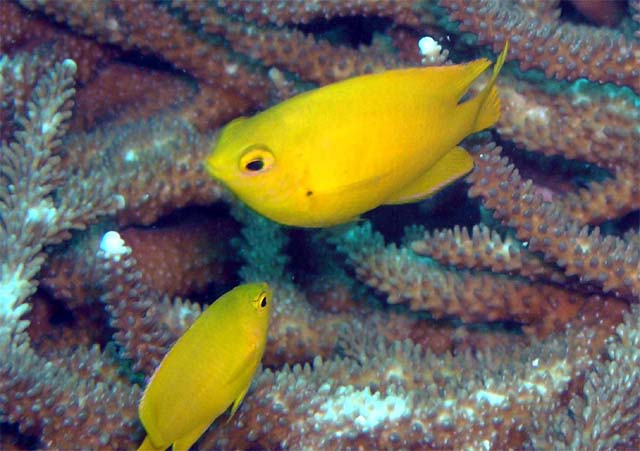
The lemon damselfish

Pomacentrus moluccensis lives in and around coral reefs and is found in small groups. The diet consists mostly of algae, but planktonic invertebrates are also eaten. This fish forms pairs during the breeding season, the female laying her eggs on the substrate and the male guarding them and fanning them to keep them well-aerated. This fish is preyed on by such predatory fish as Cephalopholis boenak and Pseudochromis fuscus, and is better able to evade them and survive in high shelter environments such as provided by Pocillopora damicornis than low shelter ones provided by Acropora nobilis.

Pomacentrus moluccensis is a coral-associated species that has been shown to decline dramatically following coral bleaching.

== In aquarium ==
If the environment is crowded, it may continue to pursue the peaceful fishes. When faced to more aggressive fish and it is the only one Pomacentrus moluccensis in the tank, it usually turns around and swims away immediately.
