= Pomacentrus umbratilus =

Scientific classification
- Domain: Eukaryota
- Kingdom: Animalia
- Phylum: Chordata
- Class: Actinopterygii
- Order: Blenniiformes
- Family: Pomacentridae
- Genus: Pomacentrus
- Species: P. umbratilus

Binomial name
- Pomacentrus umbratilus G. R. Allen, Erdmann and Pertiwi, 2022

Species of fish

Pomacentrus umbratilus is a species of damselfish native to the Surin Islands, on the coast of Thailand, in Andaman Sea. Previously the species was confused with Philippine damselfish (Pomacentrus philippinus).
