= Pomacentrus aurifrons =

Scientific classification
- Kingdom: Animalia
- Phylum: Chordata
- Class: Actinopterygii
- Order: Blenniiformes
- Family: Pomacentridae
- Genus: Pomacentrus
- Species: P. aurifrons

Binomial name
- Pomacentrus aurifrons G. R. Allen, 2004

Species of fish

Pomacentrus aurifrons, the yellowhead damselfish, is a species of ray-finned fish from the family Pomacentridae, the damselfishes and clownfishes. It is found in the western Pacific Ocean.

== Description ==
This species in particular is a fish from the coral reefs of Papua New Guinea. Pomacentrus aurifrons resembles Pomacentrus smithi with a similar color scheme and physiology, and are believed to be geminate species.

According to Allen, P. aurifrons can be distinguished by its "pale grey to nearly white with blue spot on head scales, vertically elongate, blue streak on most body scales, broad zone of yellow encompassing snout, forehead, and base of anterior dorsal spines, translucent fins with bluish dorsal, anal, and caudal soft rays, and narrow yellow margin on spinous dorsal fin,". In Latin, auri means "gold" and frons means "forehead".

== Location ==
Currently there are three places where P. aurifrons can be found. Papua New Guinea, Solomon Islands, and Vanuatu are where current locations to locate the species.

== Behavior ==
Pomacentrus aurifrons spend the majority of their time in coral reefs at a depth of about 2–14 m and live in groups. The coastal fringing reefs and offshore platform reefs they live on are generally composed of a variety of different sponge and both hard and soft coral. They feed on zooplankton.

== Trade ==
Damselfish are commonly known to be vibrant species and as a result, they make their way to pet stores across America.
