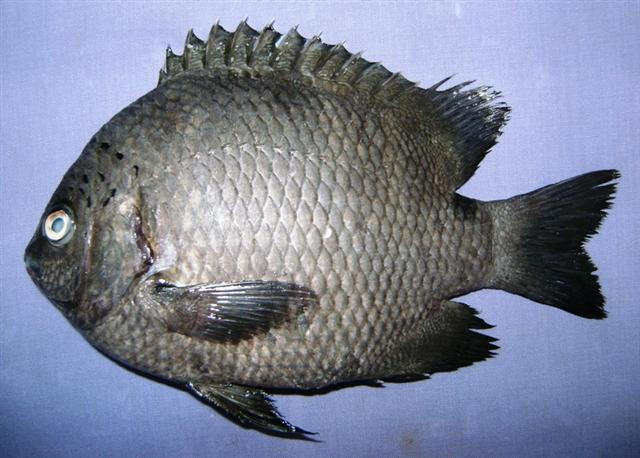

Conservation status
- Least Concern (IUCN 3.1)

Scientific classification
- Kingdom: Animalia
- Phylum: Chordata
- Class: Actinopterygii
- Order: Blenniiformes
- Family: Pomacentridae
- Genus: Pomacentrus
- Species: P. tripunctatus

Binomial name
- Pomacentrus tripunctatus (Cuvier, 1830)

Synonyms
- Pomacentrus vanicolensis Cuvier, 1830; Pristotis fuscus Bleeker, 1849; Pomacentrus katunko Bleeker, 1852; Pomacentrus montrouzieri Thiollière, 1857; Pomacentrus catunco Peters, 1868; Pomacentrus bilineatus Castelnau, 1873; Pomacentrus punctatolineatus Cartier, 1874; Pomacentrus obscurus Alleyne & Macleay, 1877; Pomacentrus elongatus Seale, 1910; Pomacentrus macleayi Whitley, 1928

= Pomacentrus tripunctatus =

Three-spot damsel

Species of fish

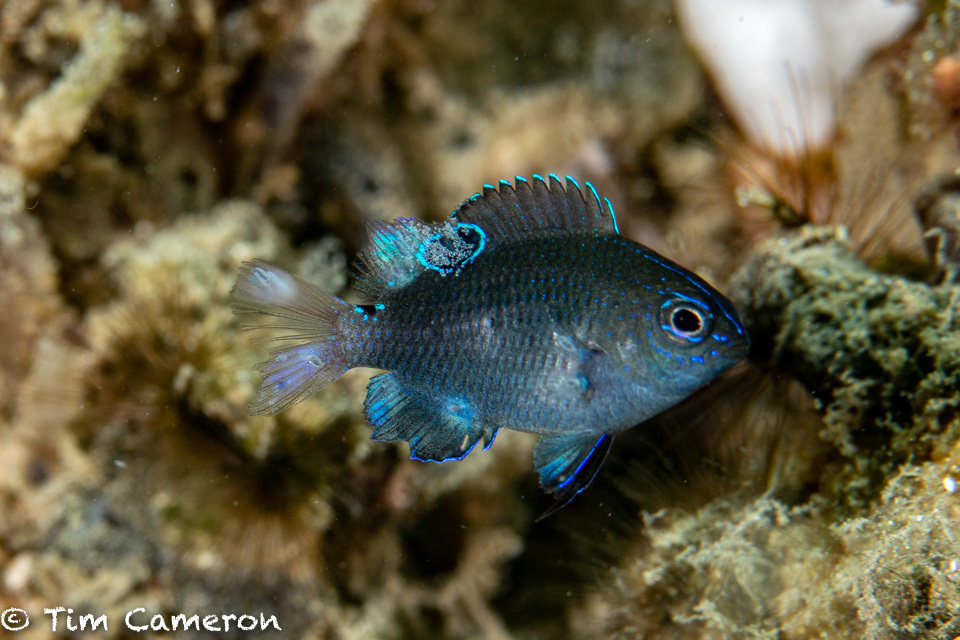
Pomacentrus tripunctatus in situ in the Philippines

Pomacentrus tripunctatus (three-spot damsel) is a small solitary damselfish. It is found in reef habitats ranging from the Indian Ocean to Melanesia.
