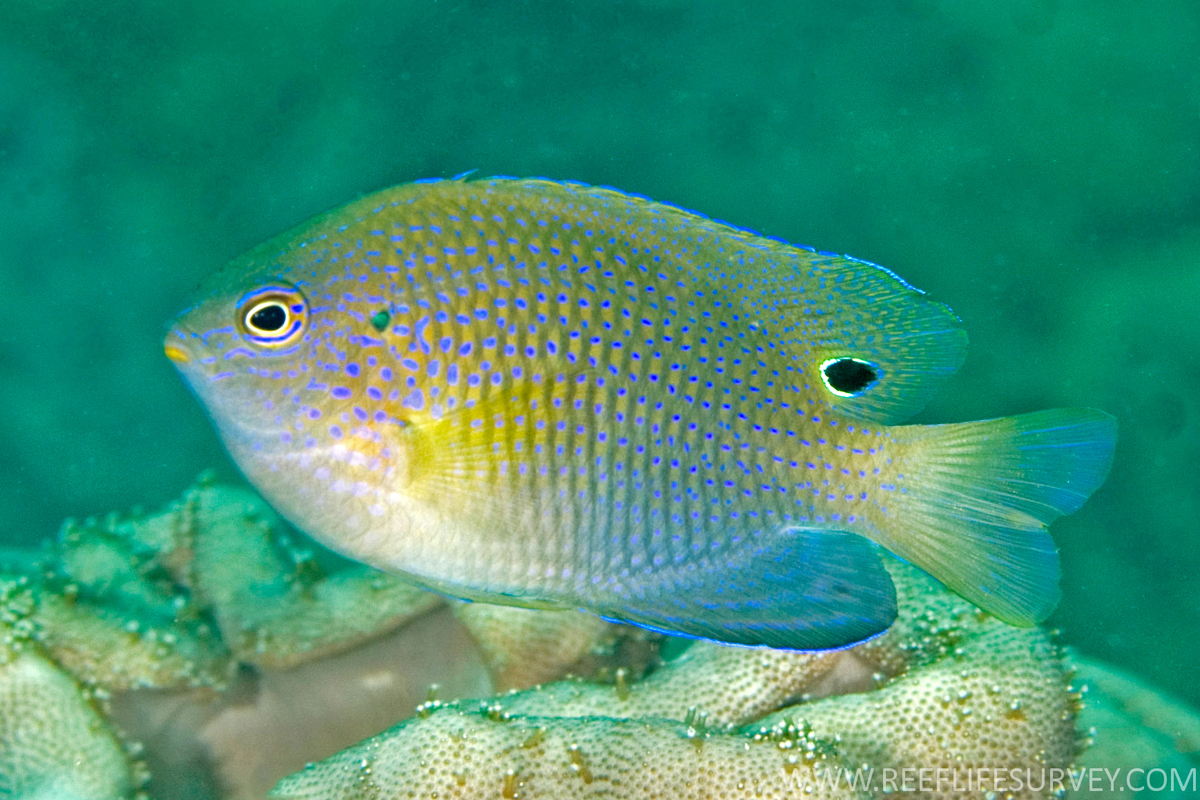

Conservation status
- Least Concern (IUCN 3.1)

Scientific classification
- Kingdom: Animalia
- Phylum: Chordata
- Class: Actinopterygii
- Order: Blenniiformes
- Family: Pomacentridae
- Genus: Pomacentrus
- Species: P. vaiuli

Binomial name
- Pomacentrus vaiuli D.S. Jordan & Seale, 1906

= Pomacentrus vaiuli =

Species of fish

Pomacentrus vaiuli, the ocellate damselfish, is a species of damselfish in the family Pomacentridae from the Pacific Ocean. It occasionally makes its way into the aquarium trade. It grows to a size of 10 cm (3.9 in) in length.

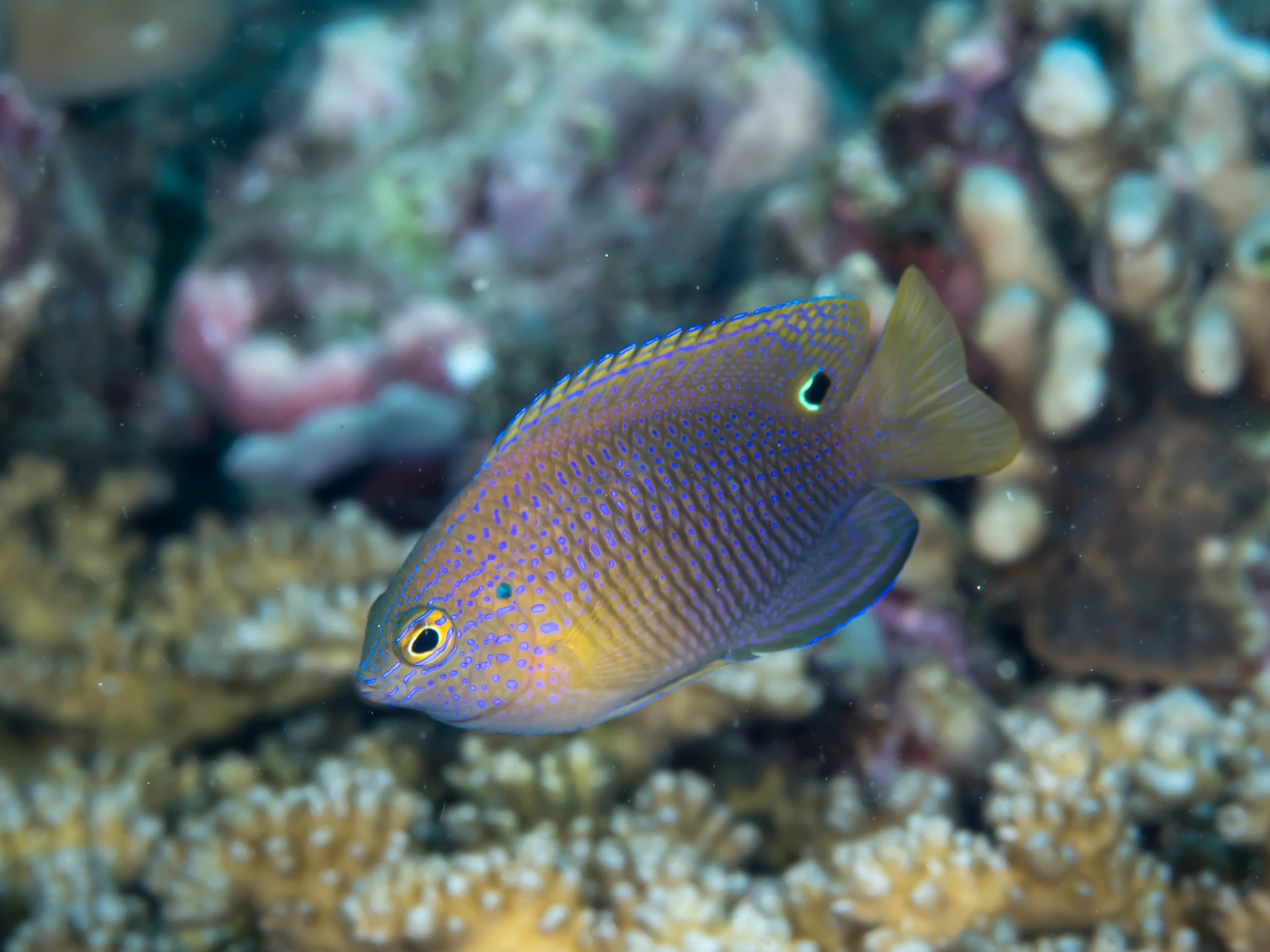

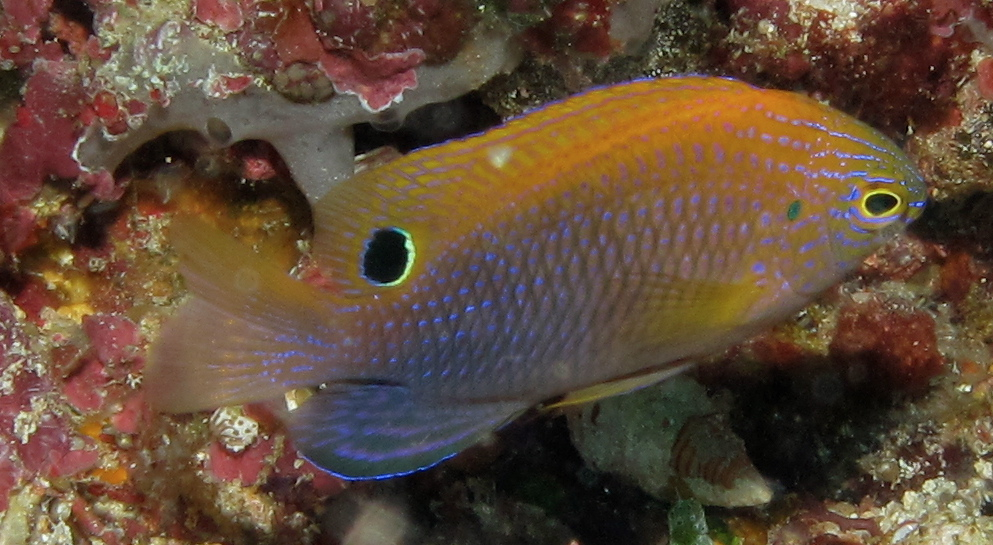
