= Pomacentrus polyspinus =

Scientific classification
- Domain: Eukaryota
- Kingdom: Animalia
- Phylum: Chordata
- Class: Actinopterygii
- Order: Blenniiformes
- Family: Pomacentridae
- Genus: Pomacentrus
- Species: P. polyspinus

Binomial name
- Pomacentrus polyspinus (Allen, 1991)

Species of fish

Pomacentrus polyspinus, commonly known as the Thai damsel, is a fish native to the Andaman Sea and eastern Indian Ocean.
