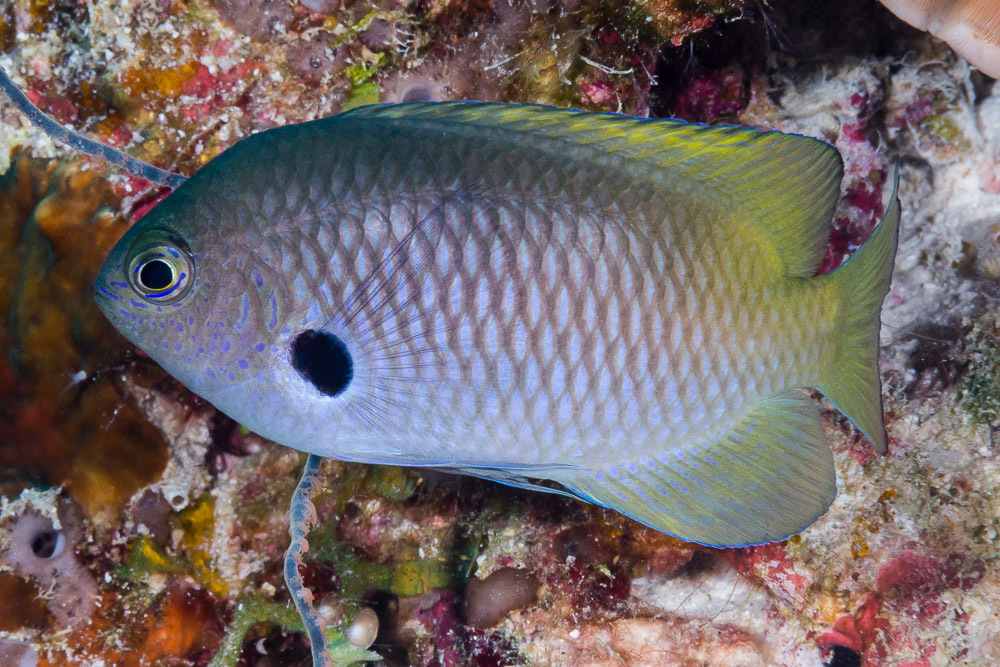

Conservation status
- Least Concern (IUCN 3.1)

Scientific classification
- Kingdom: Animalia
- Phylum: Chordata
- Class: Actinopterygii
- Order: Blenniiformes
- Family: Pomacentridae
- Genus: Pomacentrus
- Species: P. nigromarginatus

Binomial name
- Pomacentrus nigromarginatus Allen, 1973

= Pomacentrus nigromarginatus =

Species of fish

Pomacentrus nigromarginatus, the blackmargined damsel, is a damselfish from the Western Pacific. It occasionally makes its way into the aquarium trade. It grows to a size of 8 cm in length.
