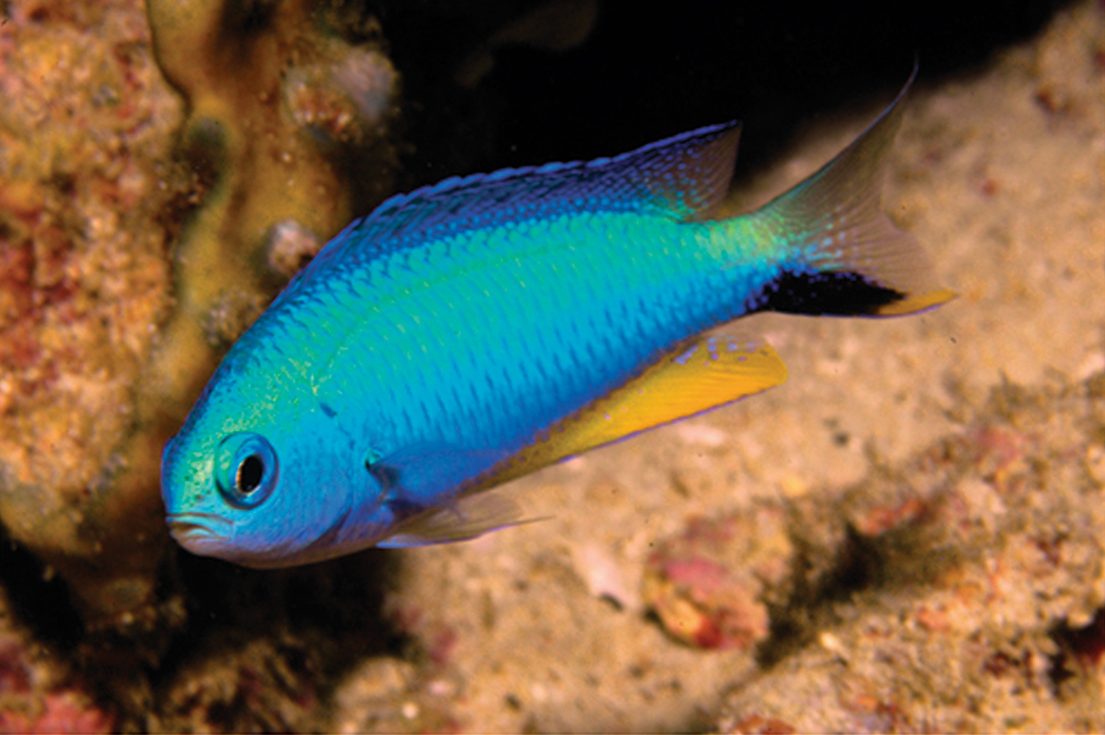

Conservation status
- Least Concern (IUCN 3.1)

Scientific classification
- Kingdom: Animalia
- Phylum: Chordata
- Class: Actinopterygii
- Order: Blenniiformes
- Family: Pomacentridae
- Genus: Pomacentrus
- Species: P. alleni

Binomial name
- Pomacentrus alleni Burgess, 1981

= Pomacentrus alleni =

Species of fish

Pomacentrus alleni, the Andaman damsel, is a marine ray-finned fish in the damselfish family Pomacentridae, found in the eastern Indian Ocean.

== Etymology ==
The specific name of this fish honors the ichthyologist Gerald R. Allen of the Western Australia Museum in Perth.

== Description ==
This fish is overall neon blue, but its anal fin is yellow and there is a broad black streak along the lower part of the caudal peduncle and caudal fin. It may reach up to 6 cm in length.

== Relationship to humans ==
This fish occasionally makes its way into the aquarium trade.
