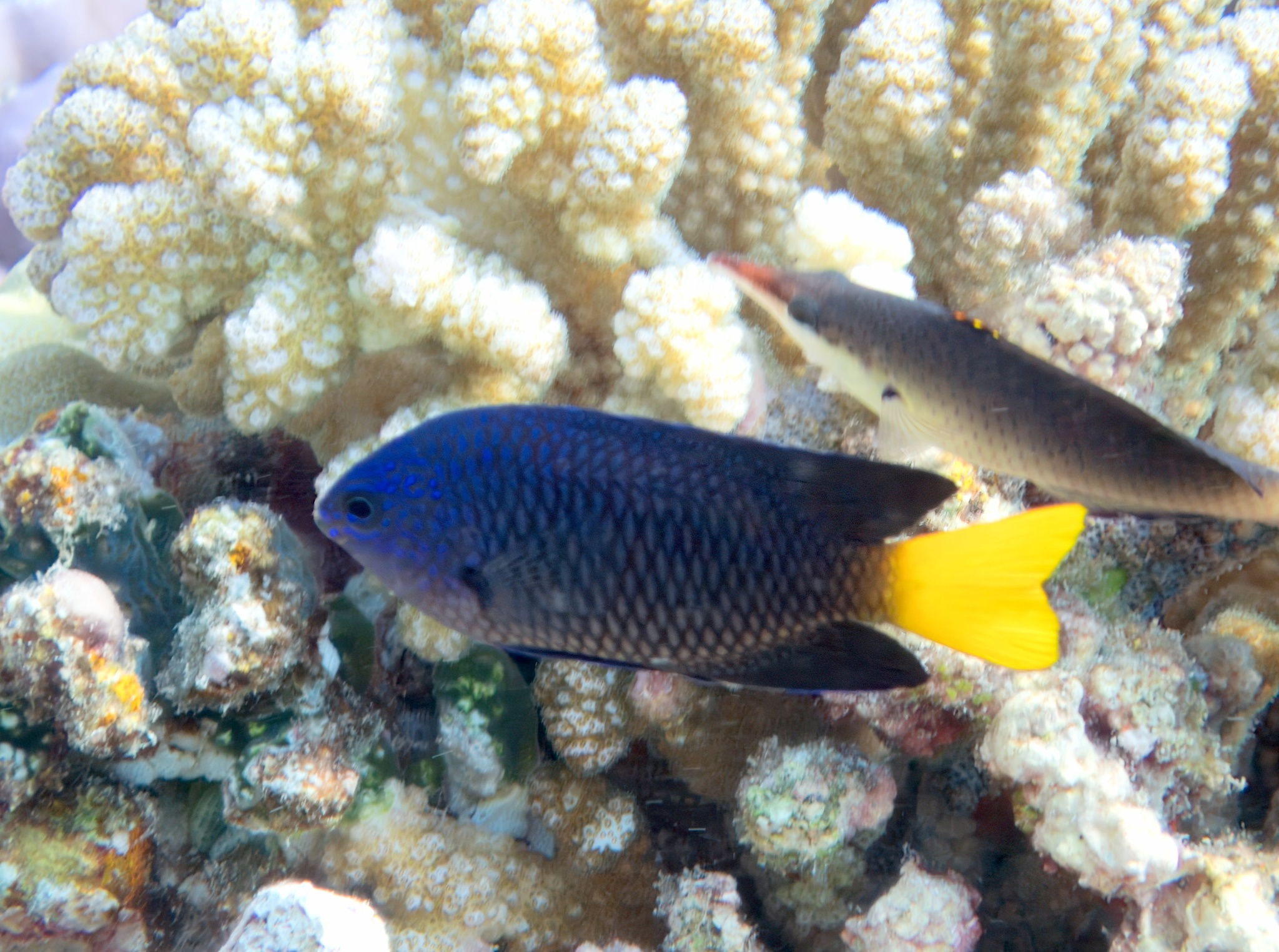

Conservation status
- Least Concern (IUCN 3.1)

Scientific classification
- Kingdom: Animalia
- Phylum: Chordata
- Class: Actinopterygii
- Order: Blenniiformes
- Family: Pomacentridae
- Genus: Pomacentrus
- Species: P. xanthocercus

Binomial name
- Pomacentrus xanthocercus G. R. Allen, Erdmann and Pertiwi, 2022

= Pomacentrus xanthocercus =

Species of fish

Pomacentrus xanthocercus is a species of damselfish formerly confused with Philippine damselfish (Pomacentrus philippinus). It was described based on specimens captured in Laamu Atoll, Maldives, in Indian Ocean. It also occurs in Sri Lanka.
