= Pomacentrus bangladeshius =

Scientific classification
- Kingdom: Animalia
- Phylum: Chordata
- Class: Actinopterygii
- Division: Teleostei
- Order: Blenniiformes
- Family: Pomacentridae
- Genus: Pomacentrus
- Species: P. bangladeshius

Binomial name
- Pomacentrus bangladeshius Habib, Islam, Nahar & Neogi, 2020

Species of fish

Pomacentrus bangladeshius, known as the Bengal demoiselle, is a species of damselfish belonging to the genus Pomacentrus and the family Pomacentridae, found in the Bay of Bengal in Bangladesh.

== Taxonomy ==
Pomacentrus bangladeshius was identified in a study on the biodiversity of fish associated with the corals of Saint Martin's Island. This research was conducted by researchers from Sher-e-Bangla Agricultural University between 2018 and 2019 using DNA barcoding. The species was officially described in 2020 from three specimens.

== Description ==
Pomacentrus bangladeshius has a standard length of 67 to 77 millimeters. It has 14 spines and 13 rays in the dorsal fin, two spines and 14 rays in the anal fin, and 19 rays in the pectoral fin. It has a single, interrupted lateral line with 18 or 19 scales. The body color varies from olive to dark brown, with a dark brown premaxilla. Adults typically have a yellow iris and a bronze ring around the pupil. The maxilla reaches the front of the pupil, the lower jaw is longer than the upper, and the teeth are incisiform to conical. The tongue is triangular and positioned far back. Gill rakers are long and cylindrical, and the nostril is rounded, aligned with the lower edge of the pupil. The opercle has a flat spine, and scales extend to the nostrils, with no scales on the preorbital and suborbital areas. An axillary scale is found above the pelvic fin base.

== Habitat and distribution ==
Pomacentrus bangladeshius is a marine fish that inhabits shallow reef flats around rock and coral outcrops. It is only found on Saint Martin's Island in southeastern Bangladesh.
