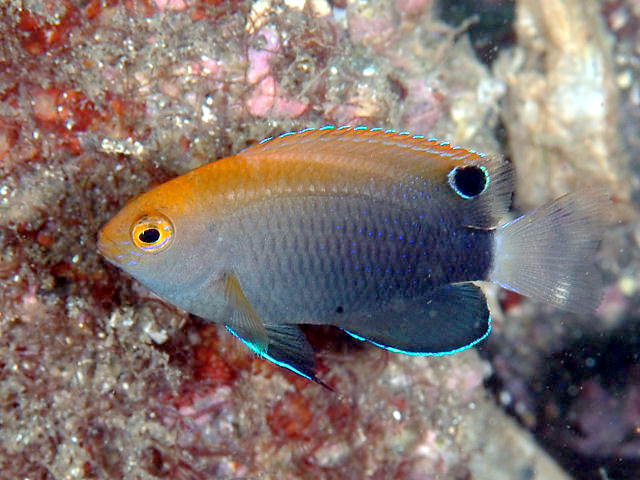

Conservation status
- Least Concern (IUCN 3.1)

Scientific classification
- Kingdom: Animalia
- Phylum: Chordata
- Class: Actinopterygii
- Order: Blenniiformes
- Family: Pomacentridae
- Genus: Pomacentrus
- Species: P. chrysurus

Binomial name
- Pomacentrus chrysurus (Cuvier, 1830)

Synonyms
- Pomacentrus rhodonotus Bleeker, 1853; Pomacentrus hogoleuensis Hombron & Jacquinot, 1853; Glyphidodon luteocaudatus Saville-Kent, 1893; Pomacentrus luteocaudatus (Saville-Kent, 1893); Pomacentrus flavicauda Whitley, 1928

= Pomacentrus chrysurus =

Species of fish

Pomacentrus chrysurus, the whitetail damselfish, is a species of damselfish in the family Pomacentridae. It is found in the Indo-Pacific. It can grow up to 9 centimetres (3.5 in). They are found at a depth range from 0 to 3 metres (0.0 to 9.8 ft).

== Distribution and habitat ==
This fish is found in the Indo-Pacific. Its range in the Indian Ocean is around Christmas Island. Most of the population is found in the Pacific Ocean. Its range in the Pacific Ocean ranges from Indonesia, the Philippines, the Ryukyu Islands in Japan, Australia, and the Solomon Islands. This fish is found at a depth range between 0 to 3 metres (0.0 to 9.8 ft). Adults live in coral or rocky outcrops around sandy areas.

== Description ==
The maximum length for this fish is 9 centimetres (3.5 in). Its fins have 13 dorsal spines, 14 to 16 dorsal rays, 2 anal spines, and 15 to 16 anal rays. This fish is orange on the top and blue or bluish gray on the bottom. On the dorsal fin, there is a black spot. Around its spot, the top of its dorsal fin, the bottom of its anal and pelvic fins, there is a blue outline. The blue outline on its pectoral and anal fins are outlined with black. The caudal fin of this fish is clear.
