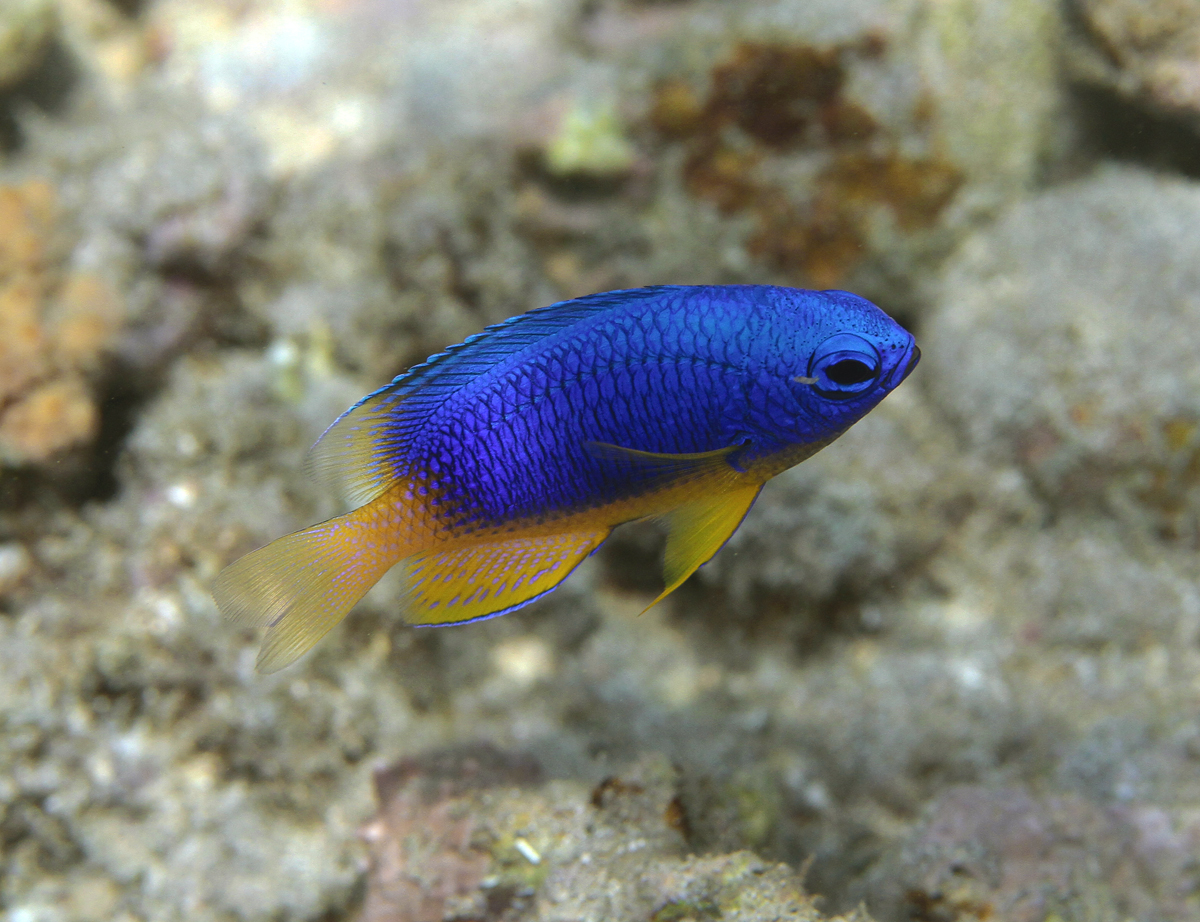

Conservation status
- Least Concern (IUCN 3.1)

Scientific classification
- Domain: Eukaryota
- Kingdom: Animalia
- Phylum: Chordata
- Class: Actinopterygii
- Order: Blenniiformes
- Family: Pomacentridae
- Genus: Pomacentrus
- Species: P. caeruleus

Binomial name
- Pomacentrus caeruleus Quoy & Gaimard, 1825

= Pomacentrus caeruleus =

Species of fish

Pomacentrus caeruleus, the cerulean damselfish, is a species of damselfish from the Western Indian Ocean. It occasionally makes its way into the aquarium trade. It grows to 10 cm (3.9 in) in length.
