= Pomacentrus littoralis =

Conservation status
- Least Concern (IUCN 3.1)

Scientific classification
- Kingdom: Animalia
- Phylum: Chordata
- Class: Actinopterygii
- Order: Blenniiformes
- Family: Pomacentridae
- Genus: Pomacentrus
- Species: P. littoralis

Binomial name
- Pomacentrus littoralis G. Cuvier, 1830

Species of fish

Pomacentrus littoralis, the Smoky damselfish is a damselfish species described by Georges Cuvier in 1830. Pomacentrus littoralis is part of the genus Pomacentrus and the family Pomacentridae.
