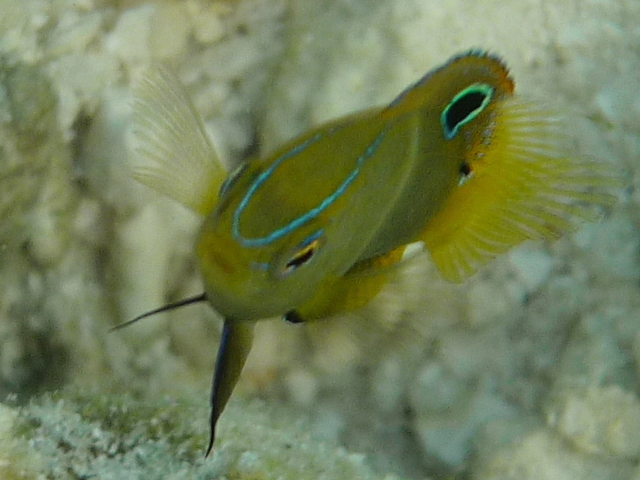

Conservation status
- Least Concern (IUCN 3.1)

Scientific classification
- Kingdom: Animalia
- Phylum: Chordata
- Class: Actinopterygii
- Order: Blenniiformes
- Family: Pomacentridae
- Genus: Pomacentrus
- Species: P. bankanensis

Binomial name
- Pomacentrus bankanensis Bleeker, 1853

= Pomacentrus bankanensis =

Species of fish

Pomacentrus bankanensis, commonly known as the speckled damsel, is a species of damselfish found in the western Pacific. It occasionally makes its way into the aquarium trade. It grows to a size of 9 cm in length.
