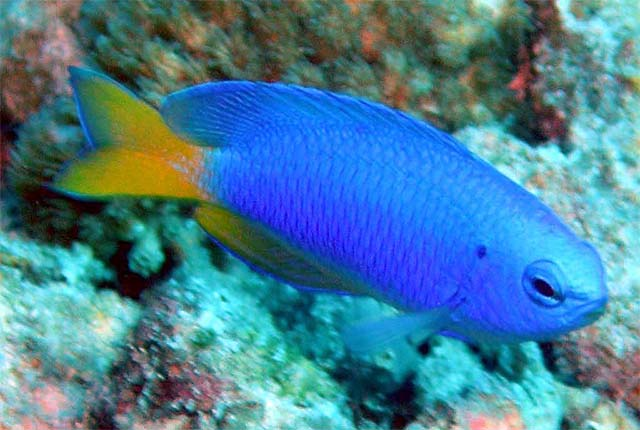

Conservation status
- Least Concern (IUCN 3.1)

Scientific classification
- Kingdom: Animalia
- Phylum: Chordata
- Class: Actinopterygii
- Order: Blenniiformes
- Family: Pomacentridae
- Genus: Pomacentrus
- Species: P. auriventris

Binomial name
- Pomacentrus auriventris G. R. Allen, 1991

= Pomacentrus auriventris =

Species of fish

Pomacentrus auriventris, commonly known as the goldbelly damselfish, is a species of damselfish found in the western-central Pacific. It occasionally makes its way into the aquarium trade. It grows to a size of 5.5 cm in length.
