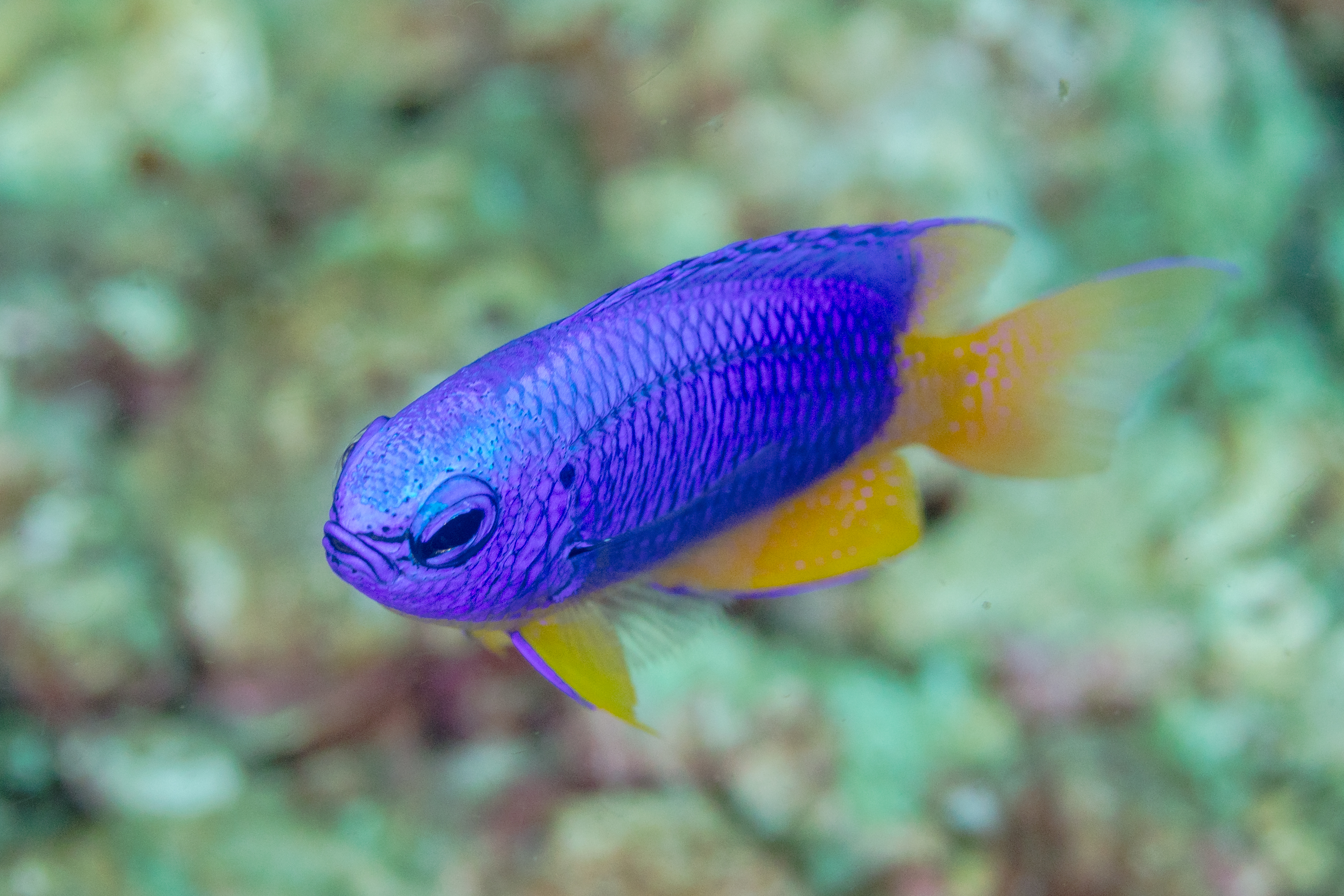

Conservation status
- Least Concern (IUCN 3.1)

Scientific classification
- Kingdom: Animalia
- Phylum: Chordata
- Class: Actinopterygii
- Order: Blenniiformes
- Family: Pomacentridae
- Genus: Pomacentrus
- Species: P. coelestis

Binomial name
- Pomacentrus coelestis D.S. Jordan & Starks, 1901

= Pomacentrus coelestis =

Species of fish

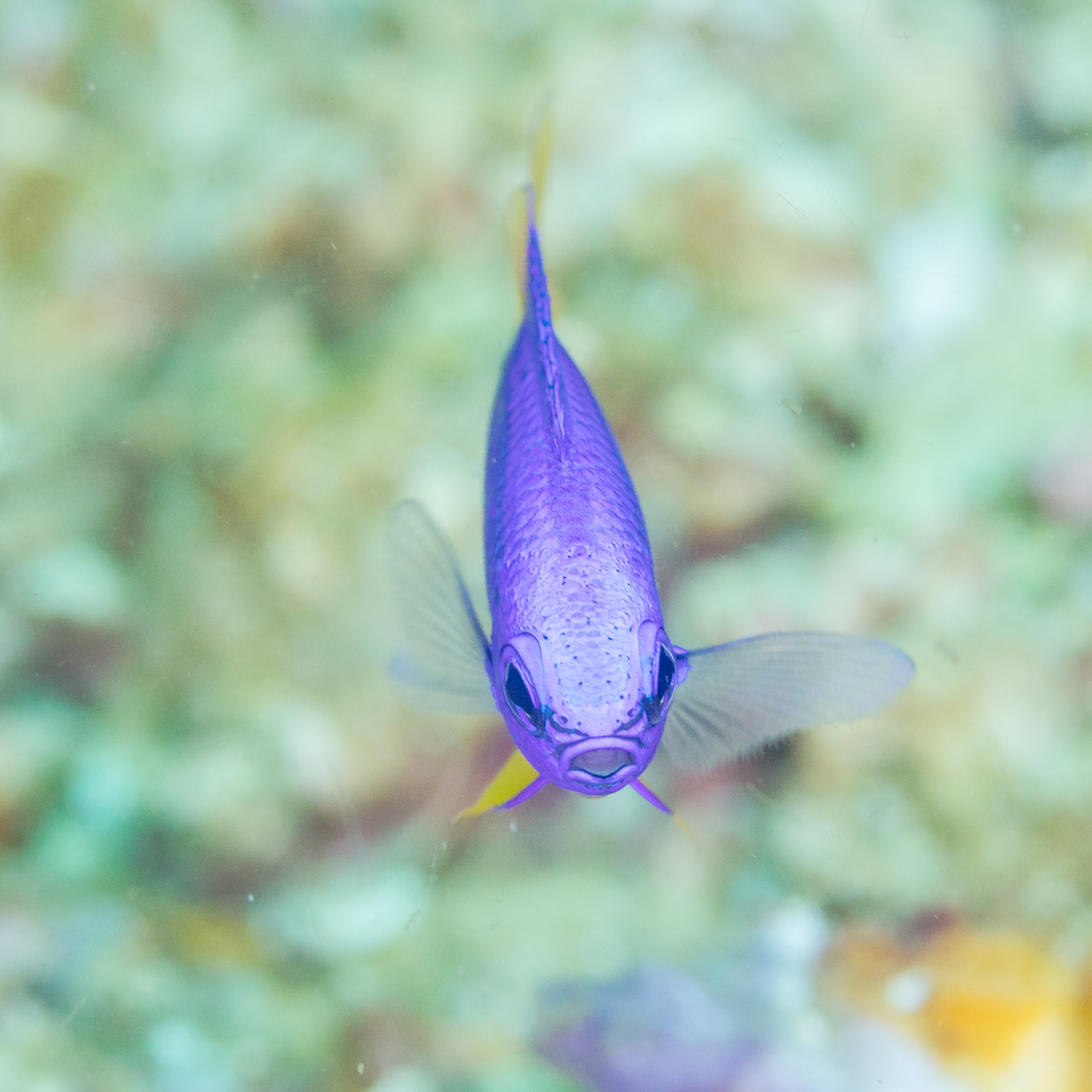
Front view

Pomacentrus coelestis, the neon damselfish, is a species of damselfish in the family Pomacentridae. It is found in the Indo-Pacific. It can grow to a maximum size of 9 centimetres (3.5 in) in length. It occasionally makes its way into the aquarium trade.

== Distribution and habitat ==
This fish is found in the Indo-Pacific. In the Indian Ocean, they are found in Sri Lanka, the Andaman Sea, Indonesia, and Australia. In the Pacific Ocean, they are found in Indonesia, Australia, the Philippines, Vietnam, Taiwan, Japan, and Pacific islands all the way to Hawaii. They are found in depths of 1 to 20 metres (3.3 to 65.6 ft). Adults are found in coral reefs and lagoons.

== Description ==
Adults can grow to a maximum size of 9 centimetres (3.5 in). They have 13 dorsal spines, 13 to 15 dorsal soft rays, 2 anal spines, and 14 to 15 anal soft rays. This fish is blue.

== Ecology ==
=== Diet ===
This fish feeds on zooplankton and benthic algae.

=== Behavior ===
Juveniles school above soft corals while adults are found in small of large aggregations over their favorite parts of the reef.
