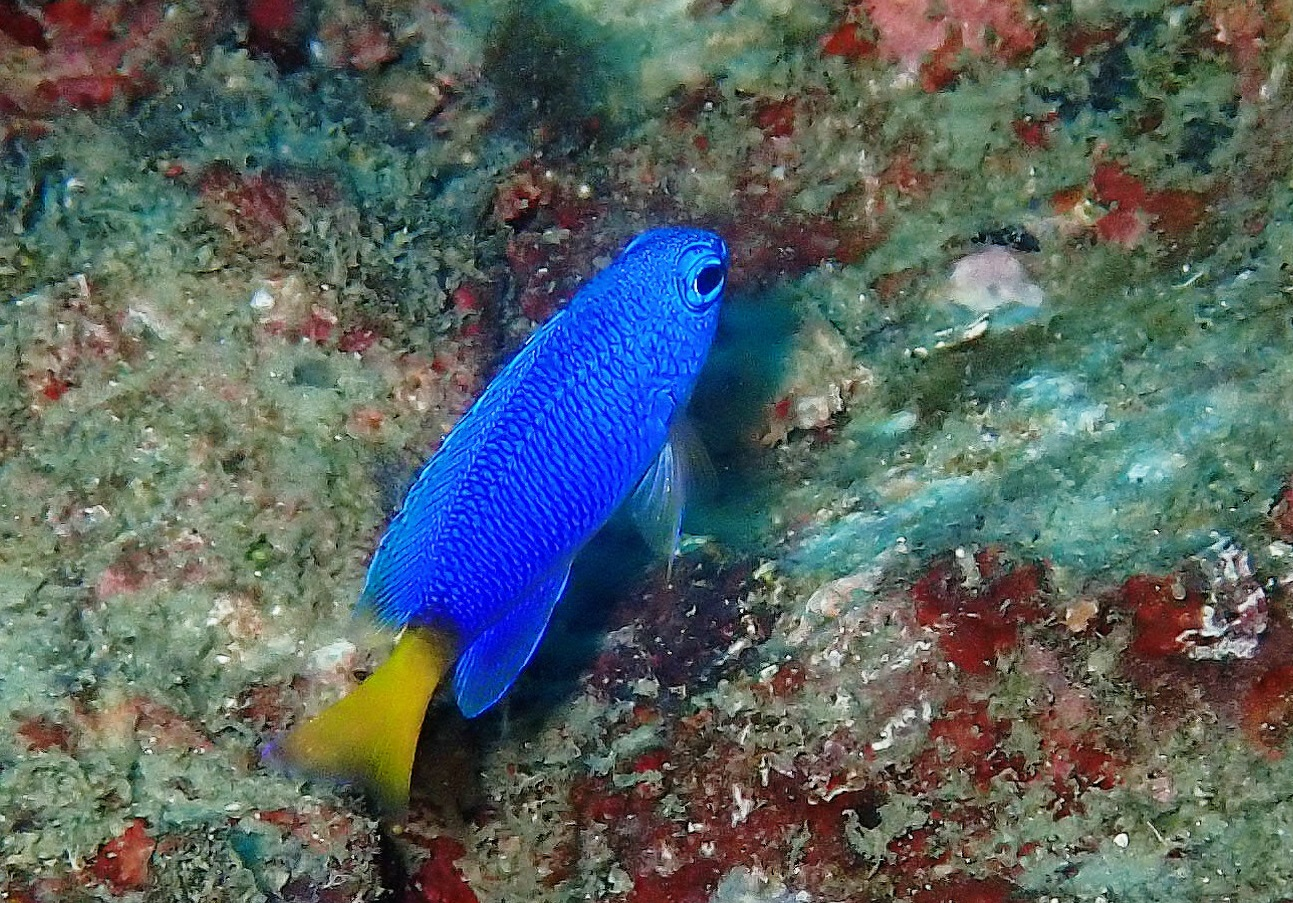

Conservation status
- Least Concern (IUCN 3.1)

Scientific classification
- Kingdom: Animalia
- Phylum: Chordata
- Class: Actinopterygii
- Order: Blenniiformes
- Family: Pomacentridae
- Genus: Pomacentrus
- Species: P. similis

Binomial name
- Pomacentrus similis Allen, 1991

= Pomacentrus similis =

Species of fish

Pomacentrus similis, commonly known as the similar damsel, is a fish native to Sri Lanka and the Andaman Sea in the Indian Ocean.
