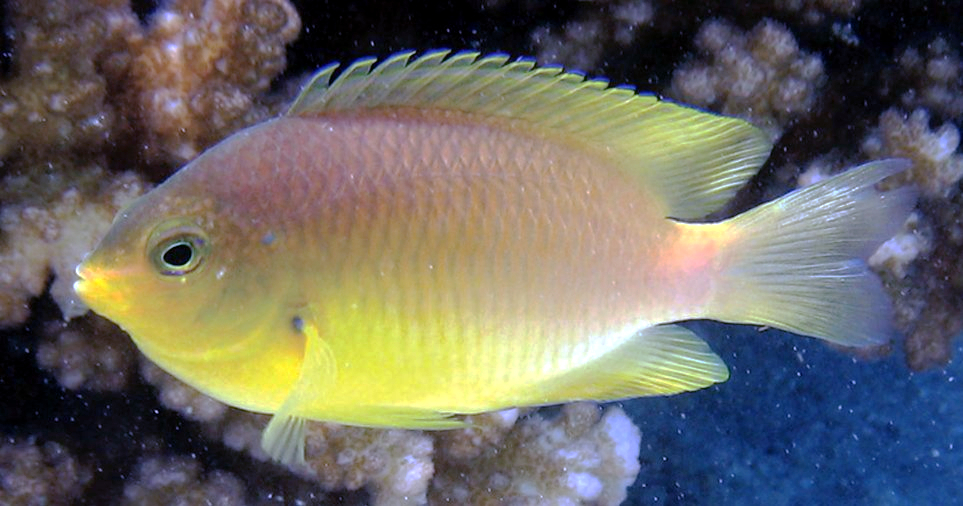

Conservation status
- Least Concern (IUCN 3.1)

Scientific classification
- Kingdom: Animalia
- Phylum: Chordata
- Class: Actinopterygii
- Order: Blenniiformes
- Family: Pomacentridae
- Genus: Pomacentrus
- Species: P. amboinensis

Binomial name
- Pomacentrus amboinensis Bleeker, 1868

Synonyms
- Pomacentrus dimidiatus Bleeker, 1877

= Pomacentrus amboinensis =

Species of fish

Pomacentrus amboinensis is a damselfish from the Western Pacific Ocean. It occasionally makes its way into the aquarium trade. It grows to a size of 9 cm in length.

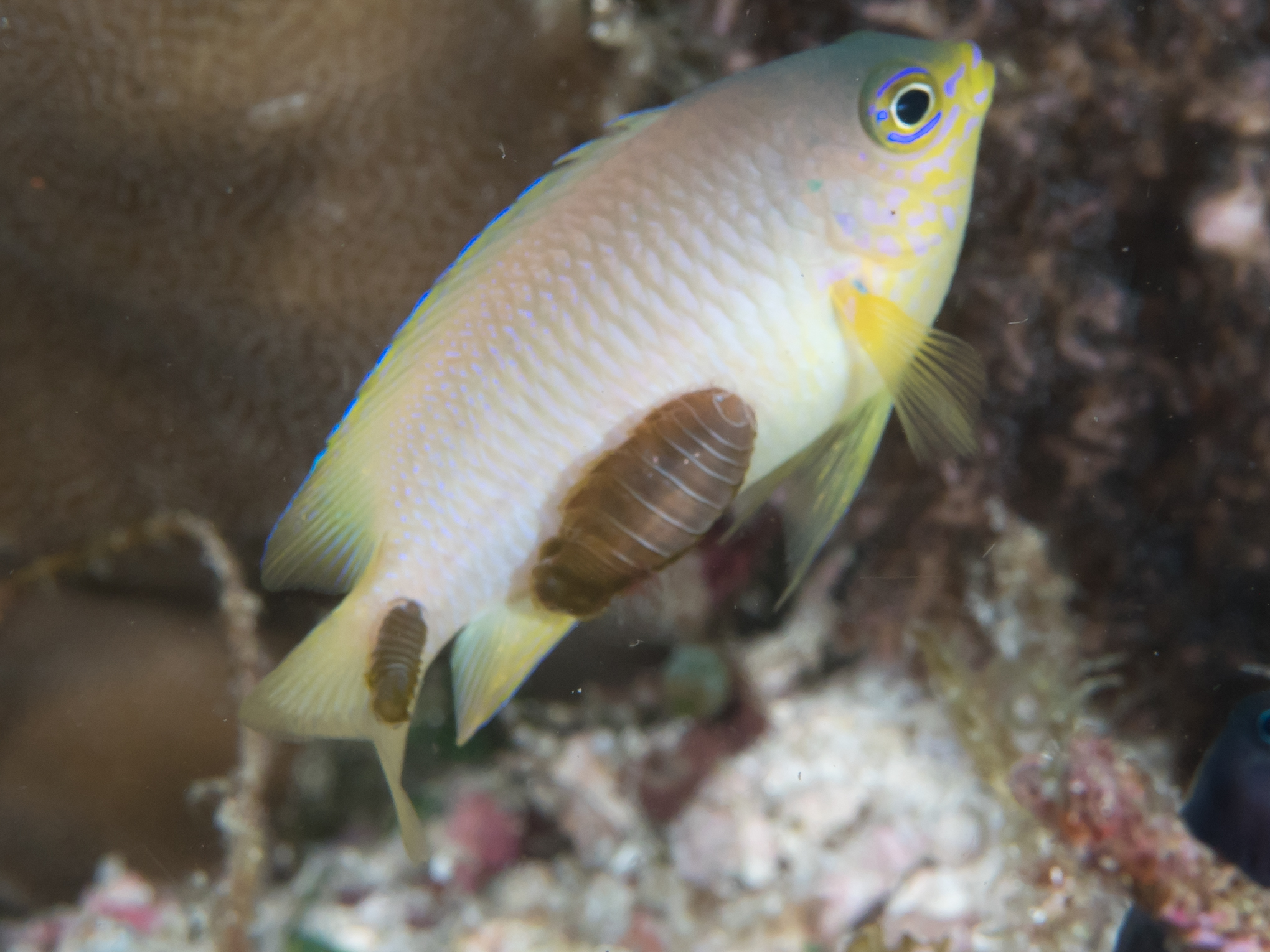
With Anilocra parasites

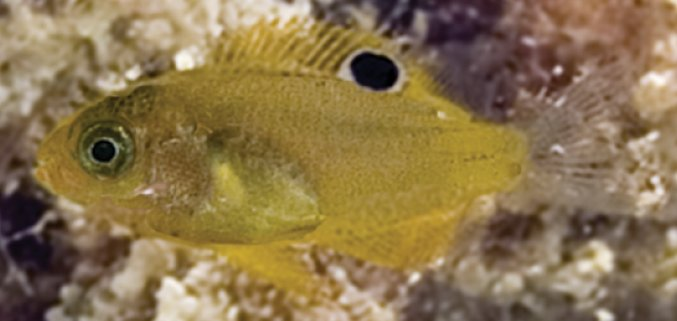
Juvenile P. amboinensis, showing eyespot on dorsal fin

They live in small groups of one mature male that guards a nest site on the seafloor and several females. Once settled, females rarely migrate. New juveniles can usually join groups easily. As they reach sexual maturity, they usually lose their "eyespot" on their dorsal fin. P. amboinensis is a protogynous species—all individuals start out as females and later can turn into males. However some males retain the appearance of juveniles, probably to sneak into the harems of dominant males.

This species has been shown to have colour vision using behavioral experiments that control for brightness, apparently being the first known example of colour discrimination in reef fish.
