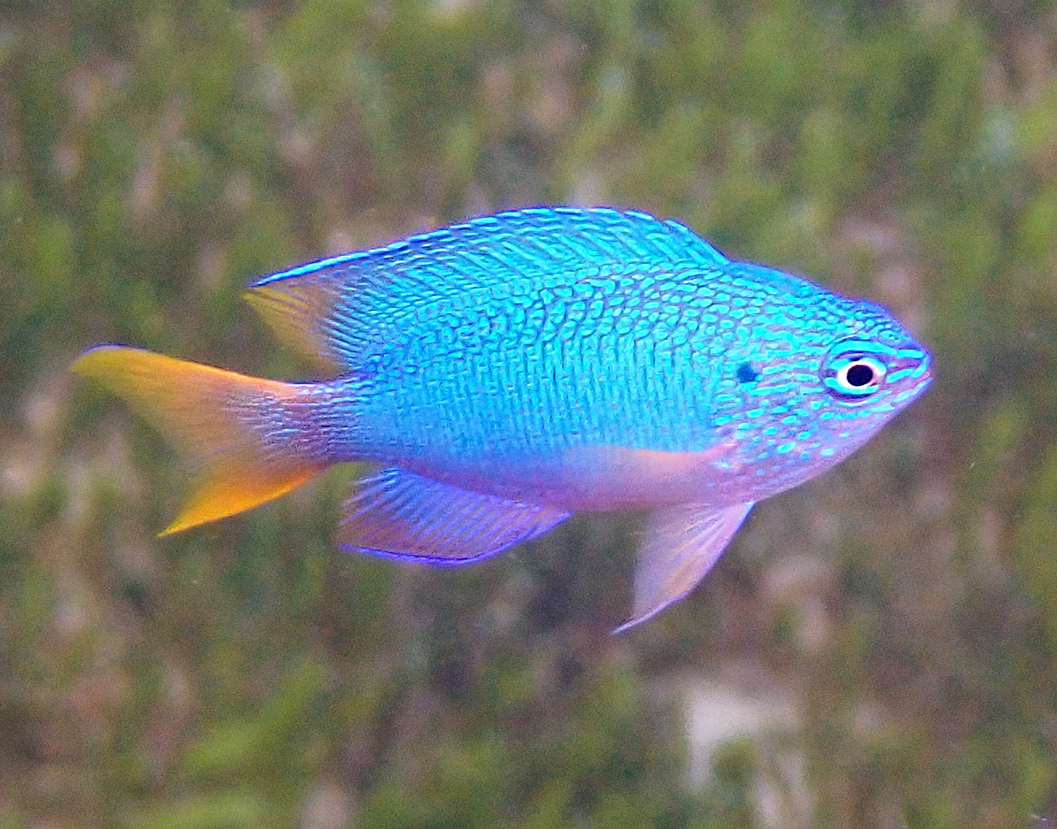

Conservation status
- Least Concern (IUCN 3.1)

Scientific classification
- Kingdom: Animalia
- Phylum: Chordata
- Class: Actinopterygii
- Division: Teleostei
- Order: Blenniiformes
- Family: Pomacentridae
- Genus: Pomacentrus
- Species: P. pavo

Binomial name
- Pomacentrus pavo (Bloch, 1787)

Synonyms
- List: Chaetodon pavo Bloch, 1787; Holocentrus diacanthus Lacépède, 1802; Pomacentrus polynema Bleeker, 1853; Pomacentrus pavoninus Bleeker, 1853; Pomacentrus furcatus Thiollière, 1857; Pomacentrus notatus De Vis, 1884; Pomacentrus suvarovensis Stead, 1907; Pomacentrus caudovittatus Schmidt, 1931; Pomacentrus hainanensis Wang, 1941

= Pomacentrus pavo =

Species of fish

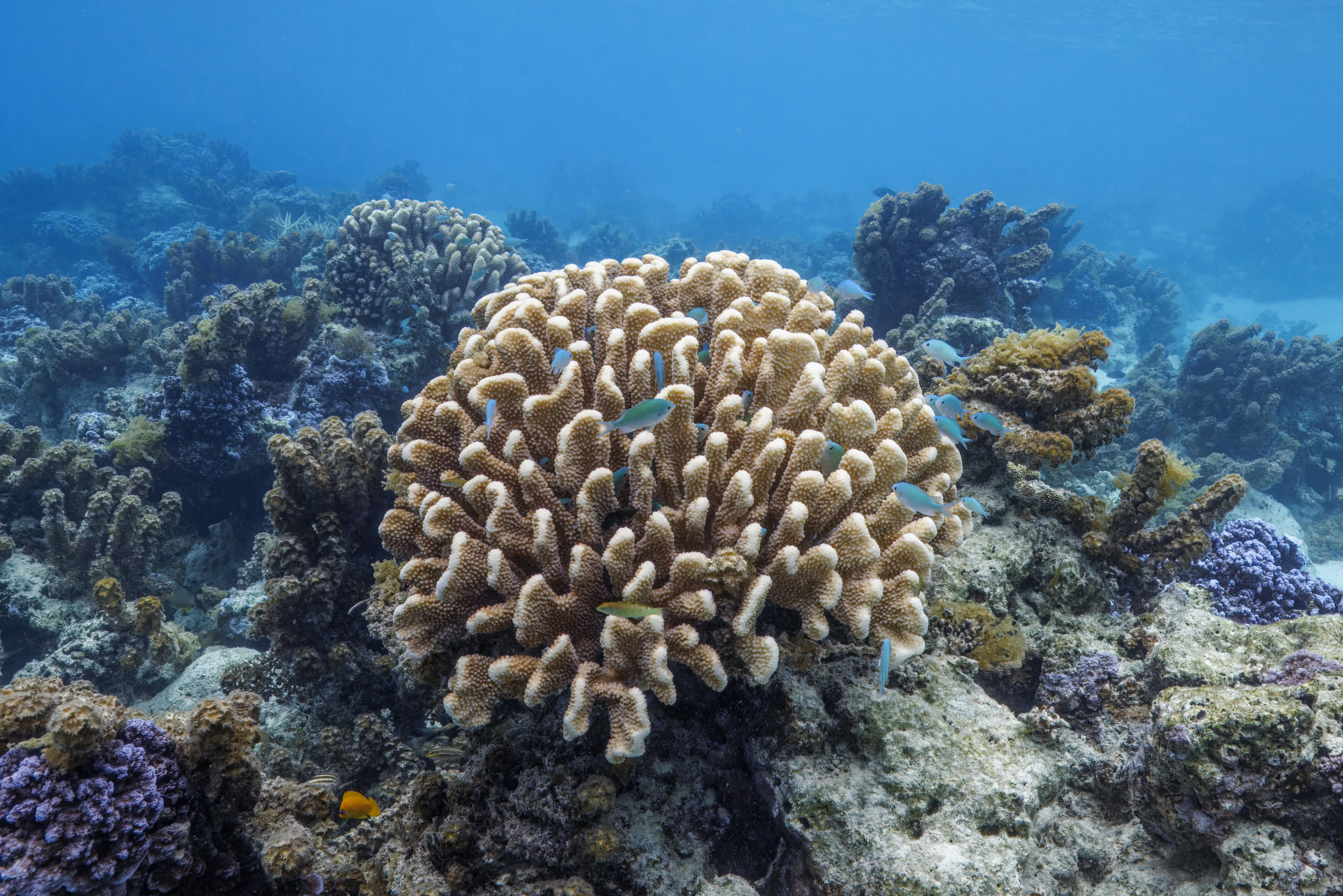
in Antler coral (Pocillopora grandis)

Pomacentrus pavo, sapphire damsel, peacock damsel or blue damsel, is a damselfish from the Indo-Pacific. It occasionally makes its way into the aquarium trade. It grows to a size of 8.5 cm (3.3 in) in length.
