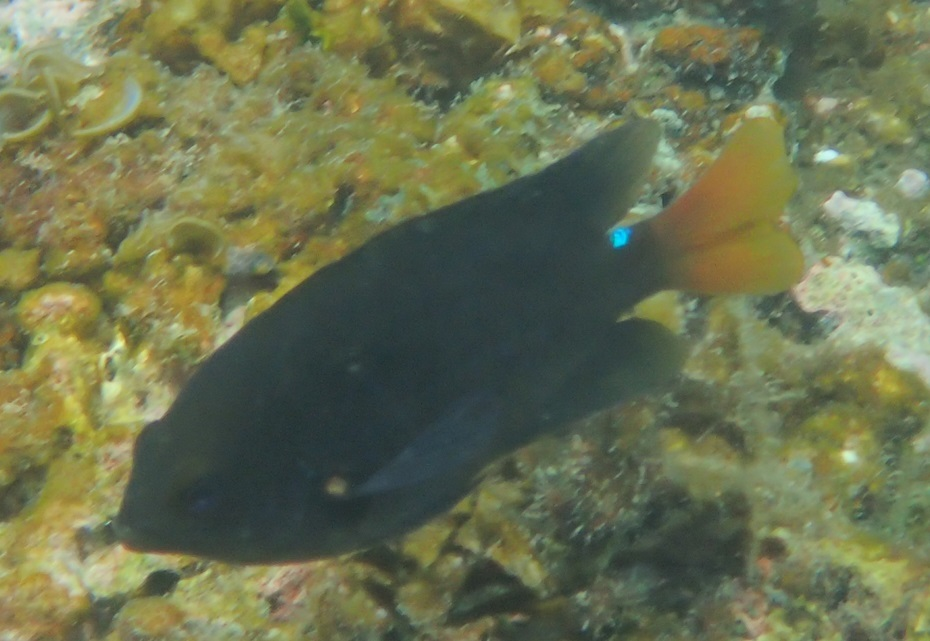

Conservation status
- Least Concern (IUCN 3.1)

Scientific classification
- Kingdom: Animalia
- Phylum: Chordata
- Class: Actinopterygii
- Order: Blenniiformes
- Family: Pomacentridae
- Genus: Pomacentrus
- Species: P. grammorhynchus

Binomial name
- Pomacentrus grammorhynchus Fowler, 1918

= Pomacentrus grammorhynchus =

Species of fish

Pomacentrus grammorhynchus, the Bluespot damselfish, is a damselfish species described by Henry Weed Fowler in 1918. Pomacentrus grammorhynchus is part of the genus Pomacentrus and the family Pomacentridae.
