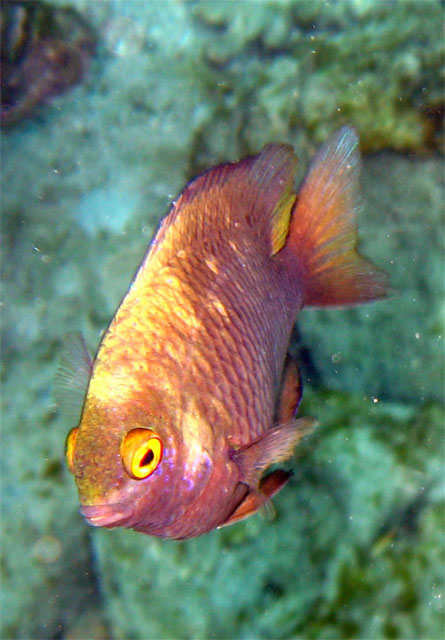

Conservation status
- Least Concern (IUCN 3.1)

Scientific classification
- Kingdom: Animalia
- Phylum: Chordata
- Class: Actinopterygii
- Order: Blenniiformes
- Family: Pomacentridae
- Genus: Pomacentrus
- Species: P. smithi

Binomial name
- Pomacentrus smithi Fowler & Bean, 1928

= Pomacentrus smithi =

Species of fish

Pomacentrus smithi, Smith's damselfish, is a species of damselfish from the family Pomacentridae which is found in the Western Central Pacific. It occasionally makes its way into the aquarium trade. It grows to a size of 7 cm in length. The specific name honours the American ichthyologist Hugh McCormick Smith (1865-1941).
