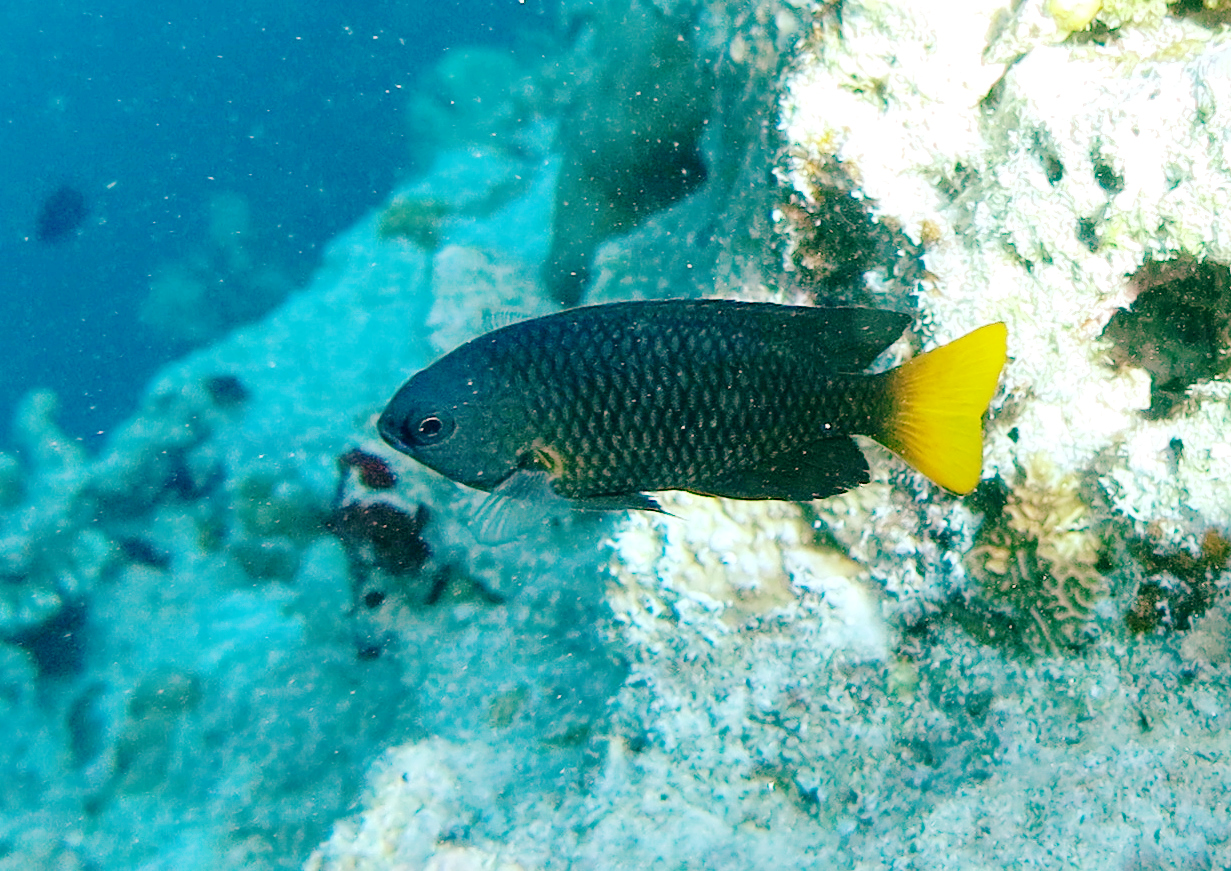

Conservation status
- Least Concern (IUCN 3.1)

Scientific classification
- Kingdom: Animalia
- Phylum: Chordata
- Class: Actinopterygii
- Order: Blenniiformes
- Family: Pomacentridae
- Genus: Pomacentrus
- Species: P. philippinus

Binomial name
- Pomacentrus philippinus Evermann & Seale, 1907

= Pomacentrus philippinus =

Species of fish

Pomacentrus philippinus, the Philippine damsel, is a damselfish species described by Barton Warren Evermann and Alvin Seale in 1907. Pomacentrus philippinus is part of the genus Pomacentrus and the family Pomacentridae.
