= Alvin Seale =

American zoologist (1871–1958)

Alvin Seale (July 8, 1871 – July 28, 1958) was a naturalist known for his aquarium design and as an ichthyologist.

== Early life ==
Alvin Seale was born on July 8, 1871, in Fairmount, Indiana, to a family of Quakers. In 1892, he attended Stanford University, and was tutored by David Starr Jordan.

== Education ==
In 1896, the year that Seale would have graduated from Stanford in zoology, he was picked by Professor Jordan, along with fellow student Norman B. Scofield, to go to Point Barrow in Alaska. His mission was to look for salmon in the Mackenzie River.

== Travels ==
Before returning to Stanford Seale collected sea birds along the Alaskan coast on behalf of the British Museum. He also went with his roommate to the Klondike to join the gold rush there. According to Seale, his companion “struck it rich.” Seale, however, was too busy exploring the native wildlife to waste his time searching for gold. In his unpublished diary Seale writes that he spent “an exciting year."

== Polynesian career and adventure ==
In 1899 Seale returned to Stanford, only to leave again to take the job of field naturalist at the Bishop Museum in Honolulu, Hawaii. Within two years he was promoted to Curator of Fishes there. He held this position until 1904, when he returned to Stanford once again. While still curator Seale made the first zoological survey of Guam in 1900. He returned to Hawaii via Manila, Hong Kong, China, and Japan. From the time of his return until 1903 Seale collected specimens from all over Polynesia.

He went exploring in the Society Islands, the Tuamotu Archipelago, and the Marquesas, Gambier, Austral, Cook, and Samoan islands. He also visited New Zealand, Australia, the New Hebrides and the Solomon Islands.

In May, 1905 he finally received his degree from Stanford, 13 years after beginning his studies. By this time he was already recognized as a world authority on the fishes of Polynesia, as well as an expert ichthyologist. He knew more about Polynesia and its fish and fisheries than anyone else in the United States, publishing several important papers on the subject.

== Letter to John Muir ==
On August 23, 1904 Seale wrote a letter to the famed naturalist John Muir, in Martinez, California. The letter thanks Muir for sending to Seale Muir's book The Mountains of California. Seale also wonders if Muir was happy with the "small panel of Koa wood" that he left for Muir in his steamer cabin. He also hopes that Muir and Seale will be able to "call for a few hours some day within a week or two." He explains that he would like to speak to him about forestry.

== Books ==
- Fishes of the South Pacific (1911)
- Quest for the Golden Cloak and Other Experiences of a Field Naturalist (1946)

== See also ==
- Category:Taxa named by Alvin Seale
