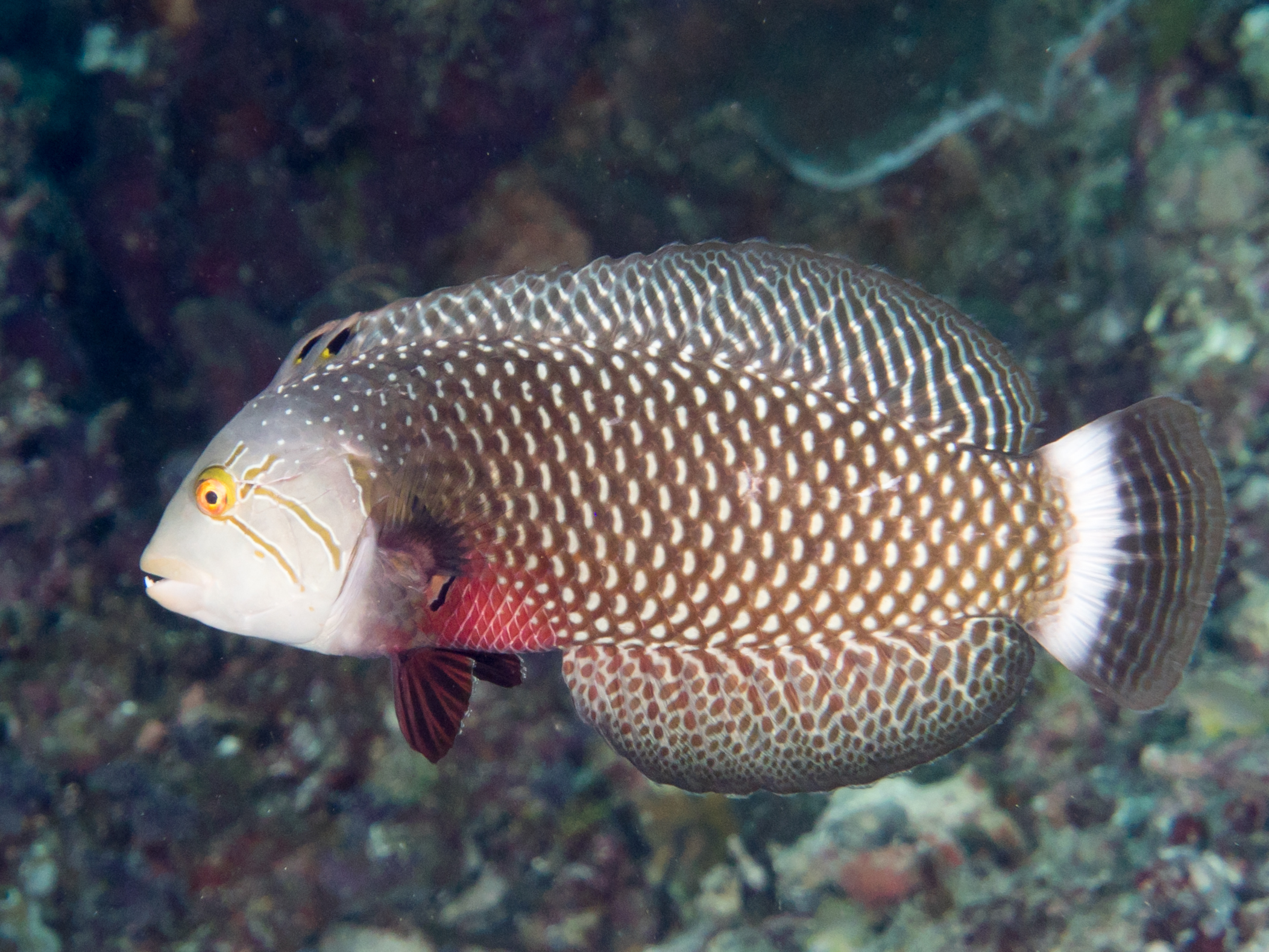
- Rockmover wrasse (Novaculichthys taeniourus)
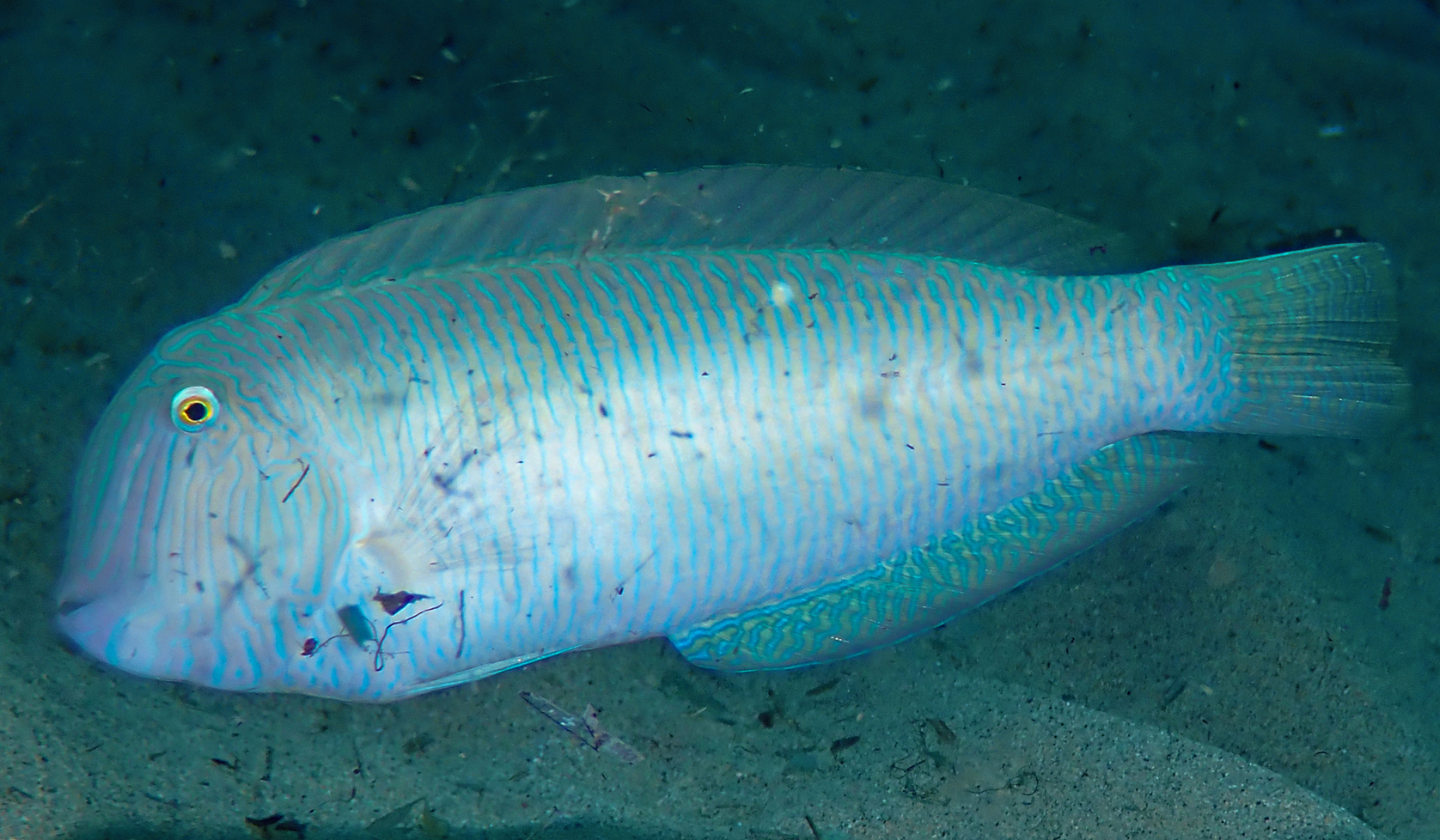
- Pearly razorfish (Xyrichtys novacula)

Scientific classification
- Kingdom: Animalia
- Phylum: Chordata
- Class: Actinopterygii
- Division: Teleostei
- Order: Labriformes
- Family: Labridae
- Subfamily: Xyrichtyinae; Bonaparte, 1841

Genera
- Ammolabrus; Cymolutes; Iniistius; Novaculichthys; Novaculoides; Novaculops; Xyrichtys

= Xyrichtyinae =

Tribe of fishes

The razorfishes are saltwater fish of the subfamily Xyrichtyinae, a subgroup of the wrasse family (Labridae). They are found throughout the global tropics, and live obligately on the sand plains of reef-associated slopes.

== Taxonomy ==
There is some uncertainty as to whether the razorfishes are the sister group to the cigar wrasse (Cheilio inermis) or to the Juan Fernández wrasse (Malapterus reticulatus). Molecular phylogenetics consistently finds Novaculichthys to be the sister group to the rest of the tribe.

Taxonomy of the group has traditionally been hindered by the problem that outwardly, some species can only be distinguished from each other by their colour patterns, which often do not persist in preserved specimens. Moreover in live specimens, males, females, and juveniles within the same species can vary greatly in appearance, and it is unknown what some of these growth stages look like in certain species. This has become less of a problem with the advent of molecular phylogenetics, but even so, these fish are difficult to find, and even more difficult to capture, limiting the study of this unusual group of wrasses.

In the past, this group has also been referred to as the "novaculine wrasses" in the tribe Novaculini, though the latter is now treated as a synonym of the wrasse subfamily Xyrichtyinae.

== Biology ==
The razorfishes live on sandbeds, usually associated with reefs. Their common name "razorfish" is derived from their flattened, blade-like snouts and strongly laterally compressed bodies. These adaptations allow them to dive into and move quickly through sand.

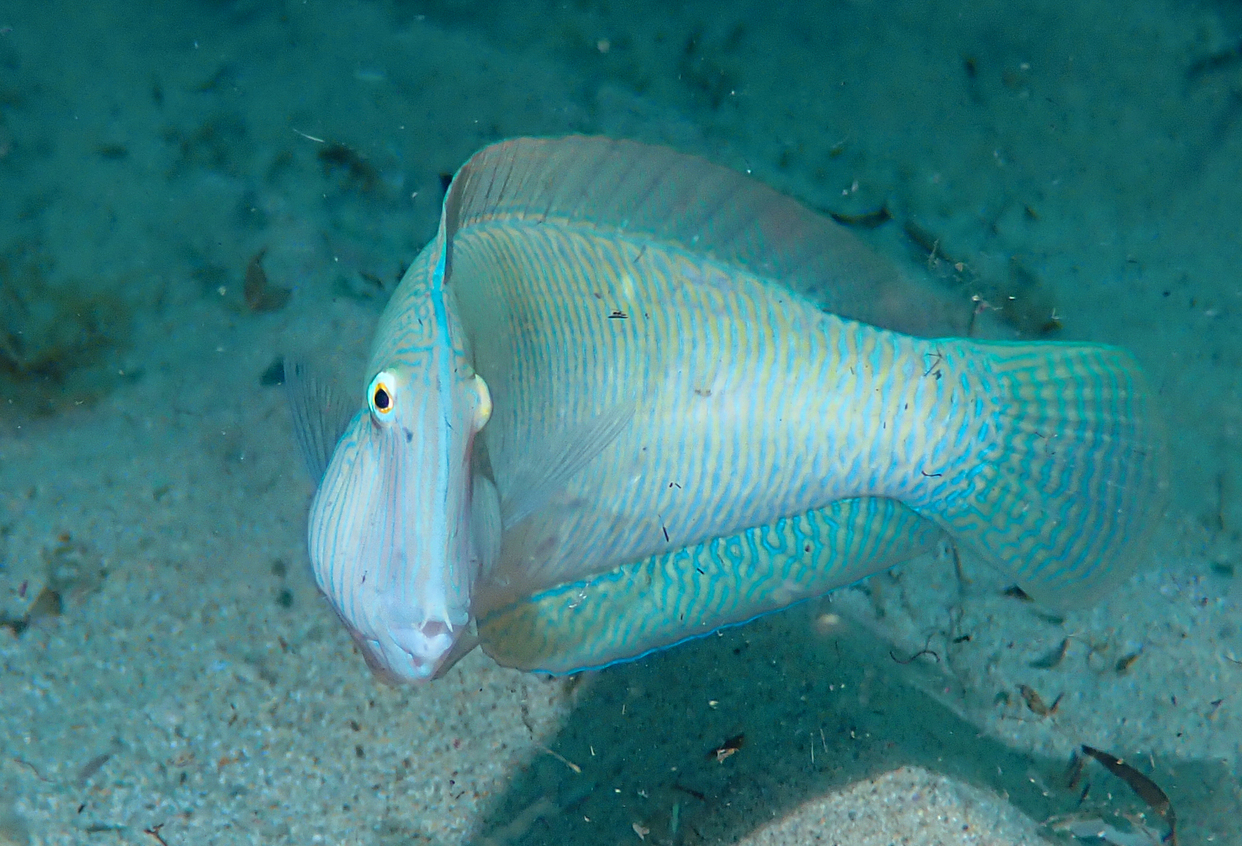
Pearly razorfish (Xyrichtys novacula), showing strong lateral compression.

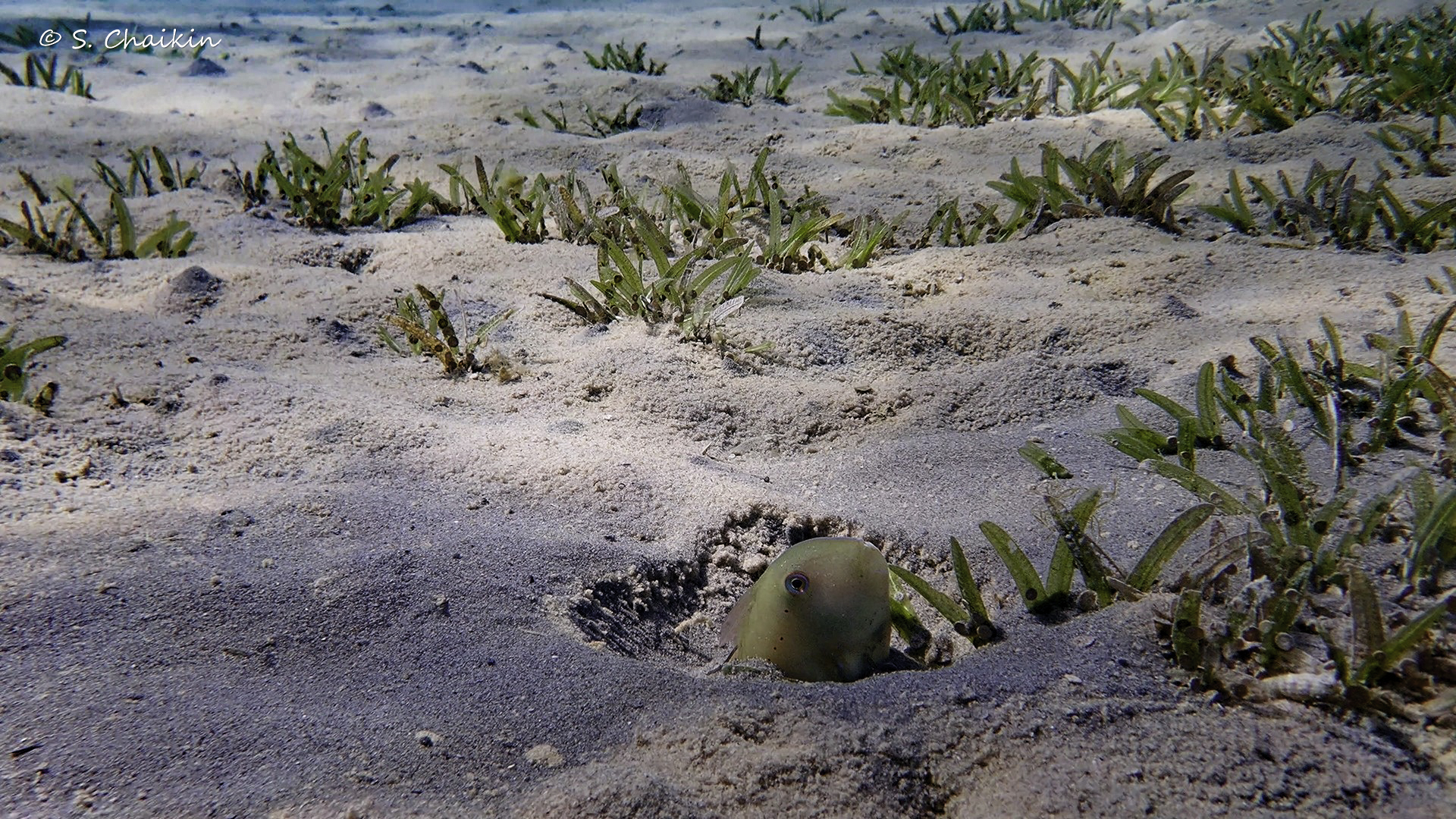
Fivefinger razorfish (Iniistius pentadactylus) peeking out of sand.

=== Reproduction ===
Females can change sex into males. Most species form harems. The larval form is relatively long lived, lasting up to several months, and can be found in the open ocean.

== Genera ==
Based on Eschmeyer's Catalog of Fishes (2025):

Genus	Image
Ammolabrus J. E. Randall & Carlson, 1997	
Cymolutes Günther, 1861	C. praetextatus
Iniistius T. N. Gill, 1862	I. melanopus
Novaculichthys Bleeker, 1862	N. taeniourus
Novaculoides J. E. Randall & Earle, 2004	N. macrolepidotus
Novaculops L. P. Schultz, 1960	N. woodi
Xyrichtys G. Cuvier, 1814	X. martinicensis
