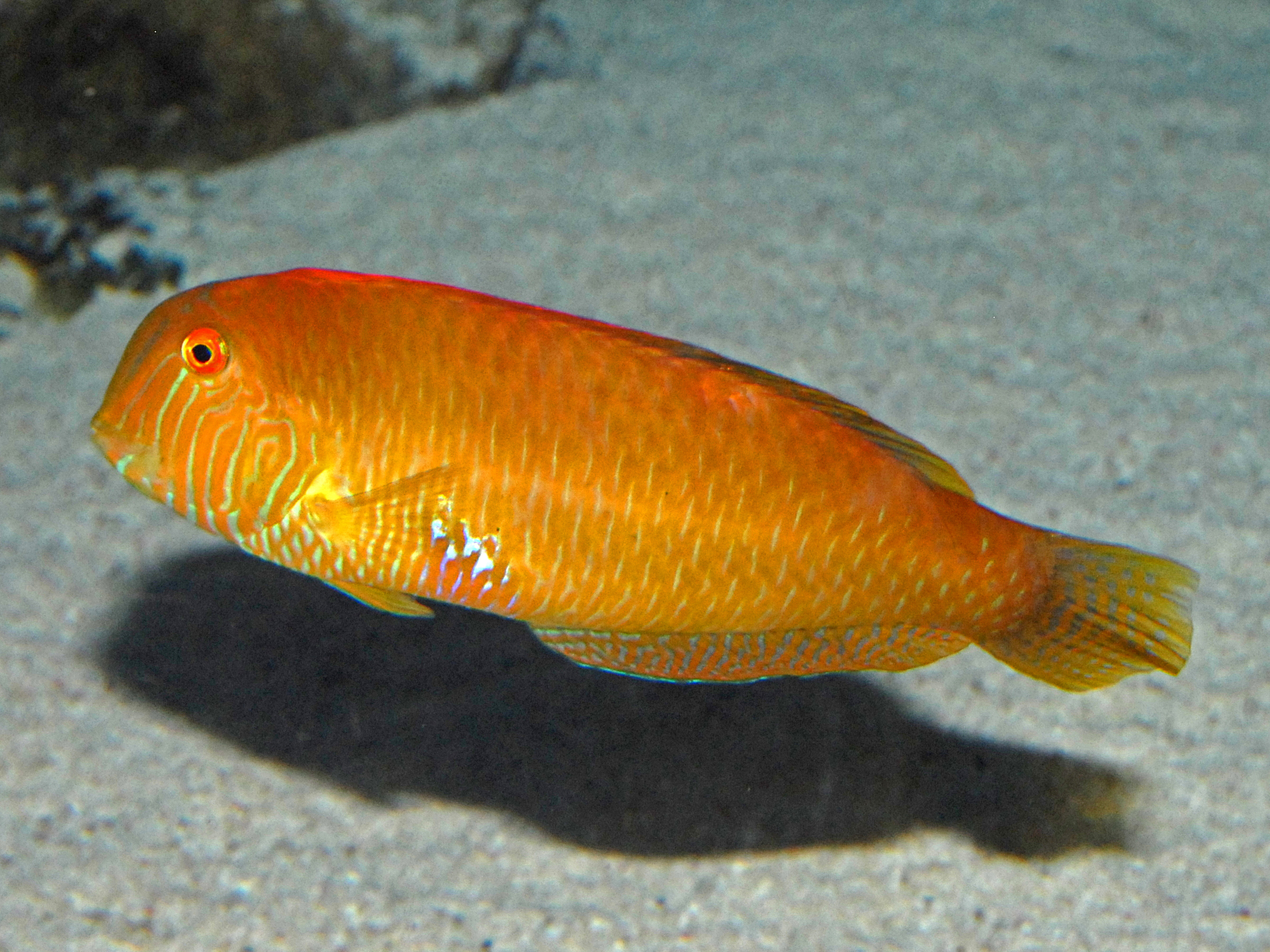
- A Mediterranean specimen at the Civic Aquarium of Milan
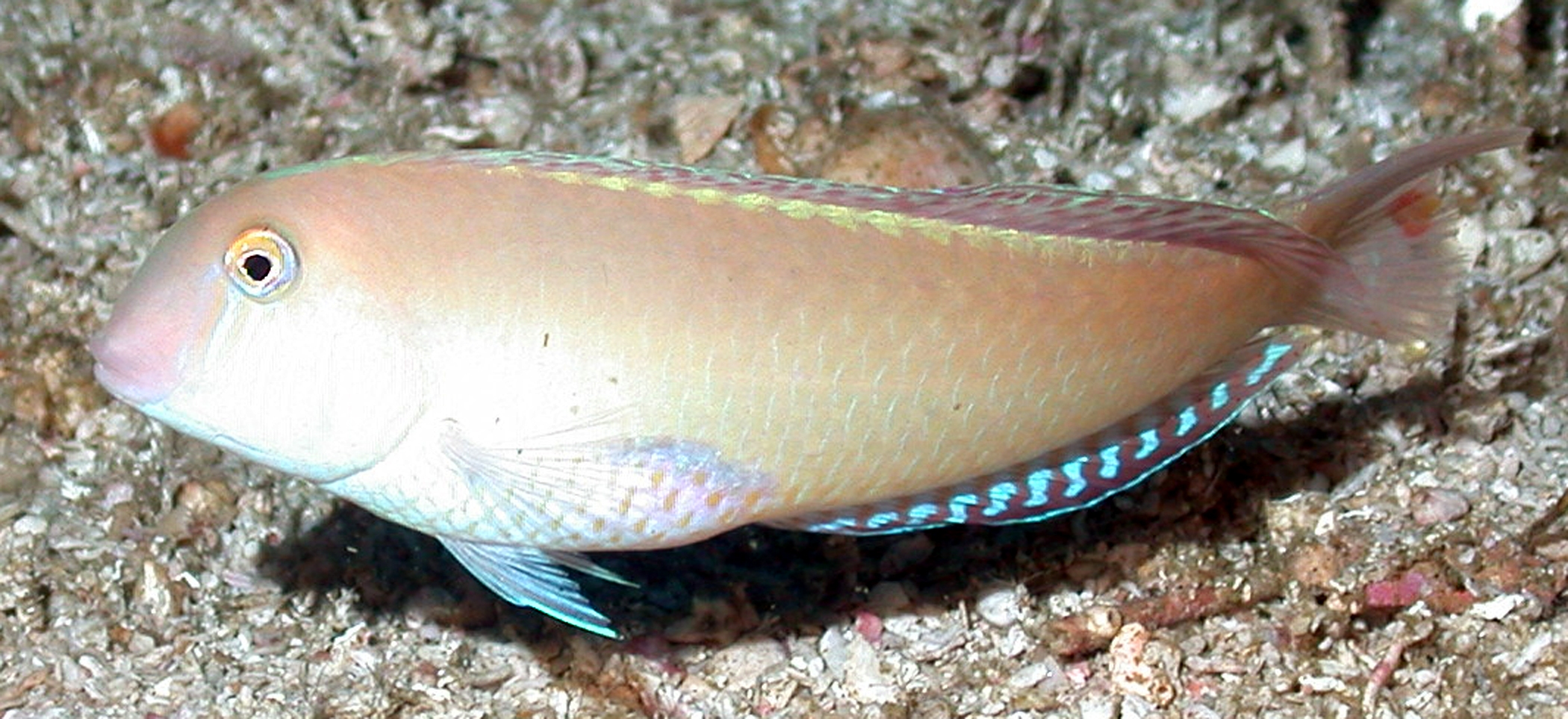
- An individual off the coast of southeast US

Conservation status
- Least Concern (IUCN 3.1)

Scientific classification
- Kingdom: Animalia
- Phylum: Chordata
- Class: Actinopterygii
- Order: Labriformes
- Family: Labridae
- Genus: Xyrichtys
- Species: X. novacula

Binomial name
- Xyrichtys novacula (Linnaeus, 1758)

Synonyms
- See text

= Pearly razorfish =

Species of fish

The pearly razorfish (Xyrichtys novacula), also known as the cleaver wrasse, is a species of wrasse found in the Atlantic Ocean and the Mediterranean Sea. It is of minor importance to local commercial fisheries and is popular as a game fish. It can also be found in the aquarium trade.

== Description ==
The pearly razorfish can reach 38 cm (15 in) in total length, though most individuals do not exceed 20 cm (7.9 in). Its body is elongated and very compressed laterally, and the head is flattened, with a steep profile and sharp teeth. Its long dorsal fin extends along most of its back. It has 9 dorsal spines, 12 dorsal soft rays, 3 anal spines and 12 anal soft rays. The pearly razorfish has a yellow-orange or reddish-pink color that is darker on the back and lighter on the belly, sometimes marked with green and gray stripes. The head shows bluish vertical lines and there are scales with brisk reflexes on the abdomen.

Upon capture, this fish is known to turn its mouth and sharp protruding teeth past 90 degrees to either side in relationship to its body in an attempt to be released from capture.

== Distribution and habitat ==
The pearly razorfish is widespread throughout the subtropical and tropical Atlantic Ocean; it also occurs in the Mediterranean Sea. It inhabits clear, shallow littoral areas with sandy or muddy bottoms, at depths of 1–20 m. In winter it migrates to greater depths, up to 90–150 m.

== Diet and behavior ==
The pearly razorfish feeds on small invertebrates such as crustaceans, mollusks and echinoderms. It can bury itself rapidly in the bottom when disturbed.

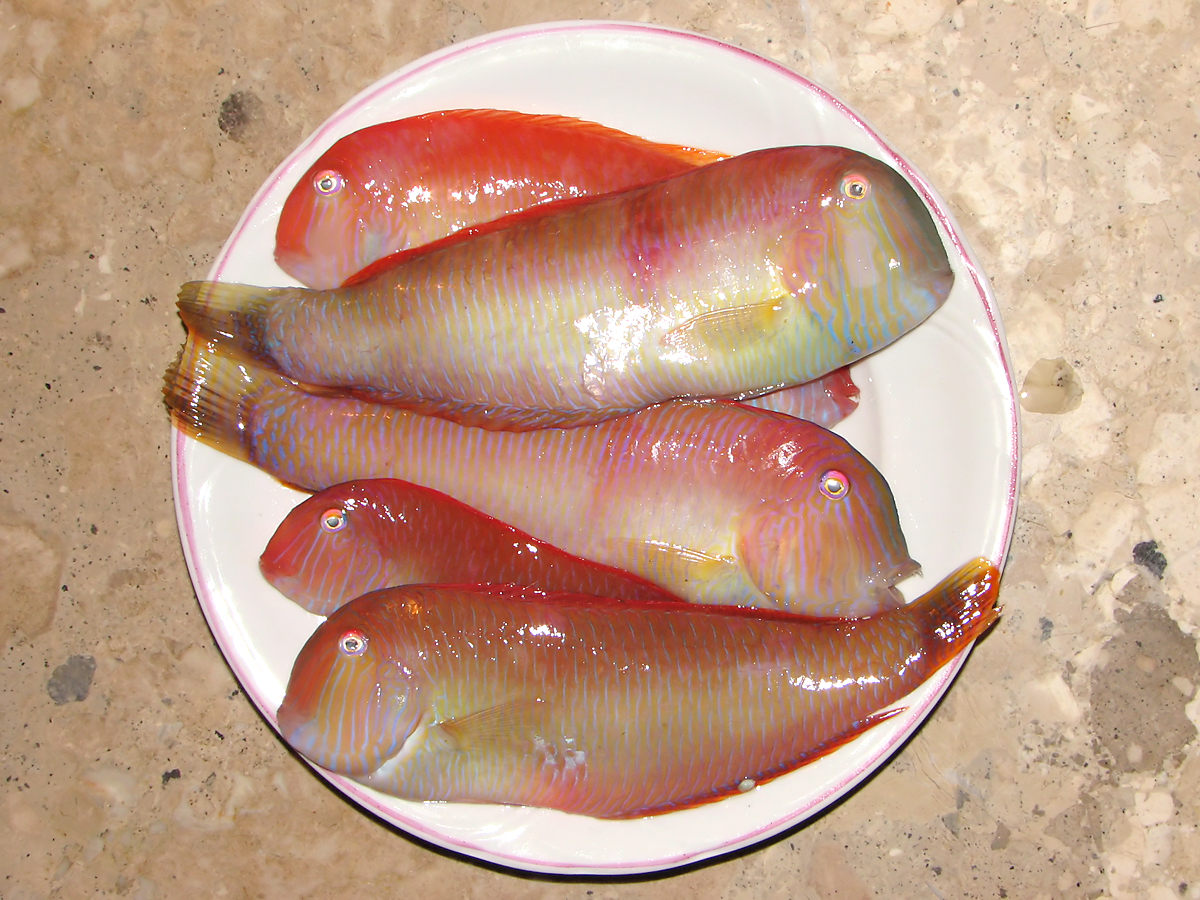
Pearly razorfish caught in Santorini, Greece

== Synonyms ==
A large number of binomials names have been determined to be junior synonyms of Xyrichthys novacula:

- Coryphaena novacula Linnaeus, 1758
- Hemipteronotus novacula (Linnaeus, 1758)
- Novacula novacula (Linnaeus, 1758)
- Coryphaena psittacus Linnaeus, 1766
- Hemipteronotus psittacus (Linnaeus, 1766)
- Xyrichthys psittacus (Linnaeus, 1766)
- Coryphaena lineata Gmelin, 1789
- Novacula lineata (Gmelin, 1789)
- Coryphaena lineolata Rafinesque, 1810
- Novacula lineolata (Rafinesque, 1810)
- Amorphocephalus granulatus Bowdich, 1825
- Novacula coryphena Risso, 1827
- Novacula coryphaena Risso, 1827
- Xyrichthys uniocellatus Agassiz, 1831
- Xyrichthys cultratus Valenciennes, 1840
- Novacula cultrata (Valenciennes, 1840)
- Xyrichthys vitta Valenciennes, 1840
- Xyrichthys vermiculatus Poey, 1860
- Xyrichthys argentimaculata Steindachner, 1861
- Xyrichthys rosipes Jordan & Gilbert, 1884
- Xyrichthys jessiae Jordan, 1888
- Hemipteronotus copei Fowler, 1900
- Xyrichthys binghami Mowbray, 1925

== Bibliography ==
- Eschmeyer, William N., ed. 1998. Catalog of Fishes. Special Publication of the Center for Biodiversity Research and Information, n. 1, vol. 1-3. California Academy of Sciences. San Francisco, California, USA. 2905. ISBN 0-940228-47-5.
- Fenner, Robert M.: The Conscientious Marine Aquarist. Neptune City, New Jersey, USA: T.F.H. Publications, 2001.
- Helfman, G., B. Collette y D. Facey: The diversity of fishes. Blackwell Science, Malden, Massachusetts, USA, 1997.
- Hoese, D.F. 1986: . A M.M. Smith y P.C. Heemstra (eds.) Smiths' sea fishes. Springer-Verlag, Berlín, Germany.
- Maugé, L.A. 1986. A J. Daget, J.-P. Gosse y D.F.E. Thys van den Audenaerde (eds.) Check-list of the freshwater fishes of Africa (CLOFFA). Bruxelles; Vol. 2.
- Moyle, P. y J. Cech.: Fishes: An Introduction to Ichthyology, 4th. ed, Upper Saddle River, New Jersey, USA: Prentice-Hall. 2000.
- Nelson, J.: Fishes of the World, 3rd. Ed. New York City, USA: John Wiley and Sons. 1994.
- Wheeler, A.: The World Encyclopedia of Fishes, 2nd. Ed., London: Macdonald. 1985.
