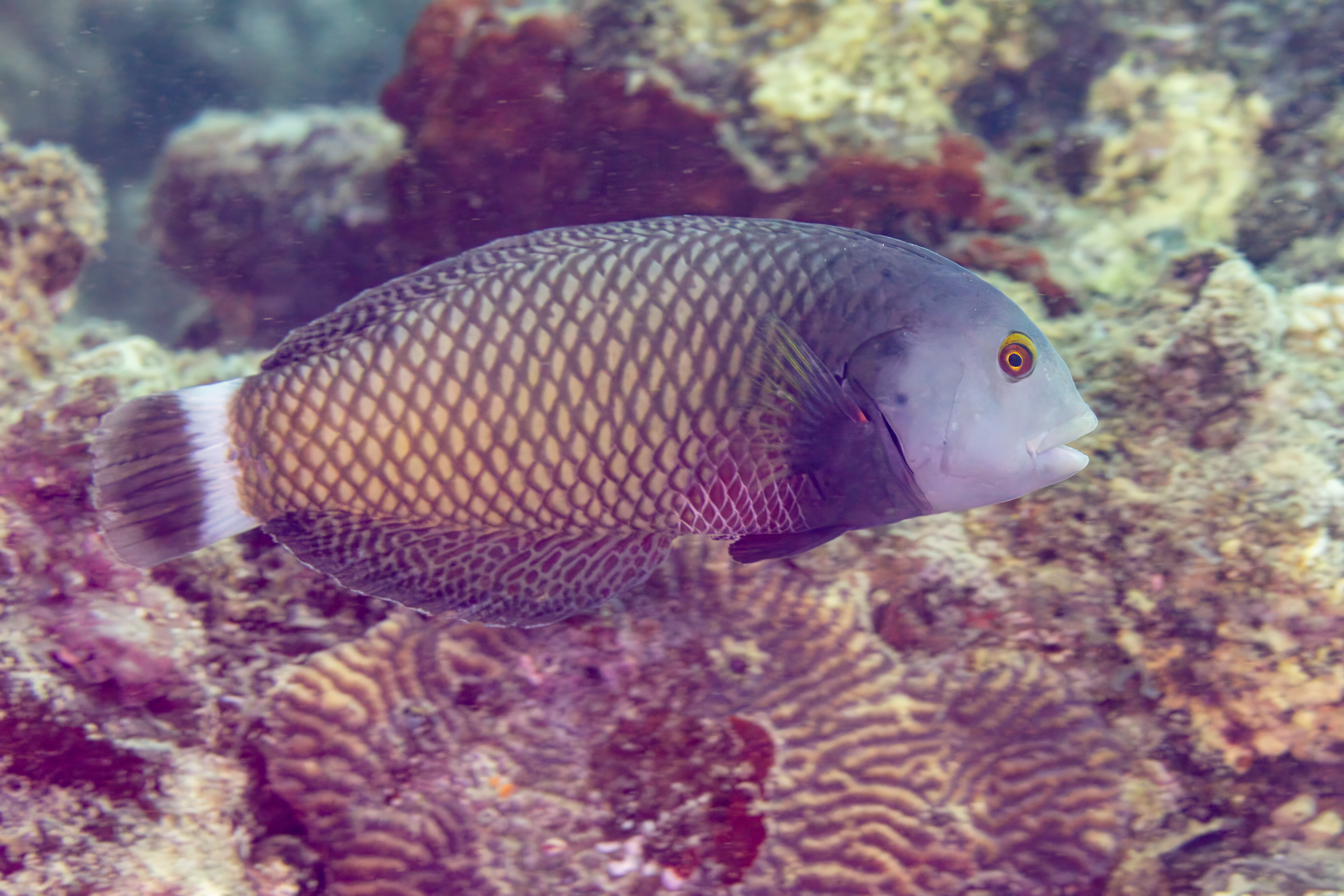
- In Indonesia

Conservation status
- Least Concern (IUCN 3.1)

Scientific classification
- Kingdom: Animalia
- Phylum: Chordata
- Class: Actinopterygii
- Division: Teleostei
- Order: Labriformes
- Family: Labridae
- Subfamily: Xyrichtyinae
- Genus: Novaculichthys; Bleeker, 1862
- Species: N. taeniourus

Binomial name
- Novaculichthys taeniourus (Lacépède, 1801)

Synonyms
- Genus synonymy: Malacocentrus T. N. Gill, 1862; Dimalacocentrus T. N. Gill, 1863; Semachlorella Fowler & B. A. Bean, 1928; Species synonymy: Labrus taeniourus Lacépède, 1801; Hemipteronotus taeniourus (Lacépède, 1801); Julis bifer Lay & E. T. Bennett, 1839; Novaculichthys bifer (Lay & E. T. Bennett, 1839)

= Novaculichthys =

Genus of fishes

Novaculichthys taeniourus, also known as the rockmover wrasse, carpet wrasse, dragon wrasse, bar-cheeked wrasse, olive-scribbled wrasse or reindeer wrasse, is a species of wrasse mainly found in coral reefs and lagoons in the Indo-Pacific region. These include habitats in the Gulf of California to Panama; tropical Pacific Ocean islands including Hawaii; the Philippines, Indonesia and Australia; and the Indian Ocean to the east coast of Africa. The common name, "rockmover wrasse", comes from their behavior of upending small stones and reef fragments in search of prey. This species is the only known member of its genus.

== Etymology ==
The genus "Novaculichthys", in Latin Novacula means razor, and ikhthús in Greek, means fish., while the specific name "taeniourus" from Greek tainía means ribbon, and oura means tail.

== Distribution ==
They are widely distributed in tropical Indian Ocean and Pacific Ocean reefs and lagoons.

== Habitat ==
Adult fish live on shallow, semi-exposed reef flats and in lagoons and seaward reefs to depths of 14–25 m (46–82 ft). They prefer hard-bottomed grassy areas of mixed sand and rubble with exposure to a mild surge. Juveniles favor shallow areas on rubble among large patch reefs or protected open patches on reef crests.

== Description ==
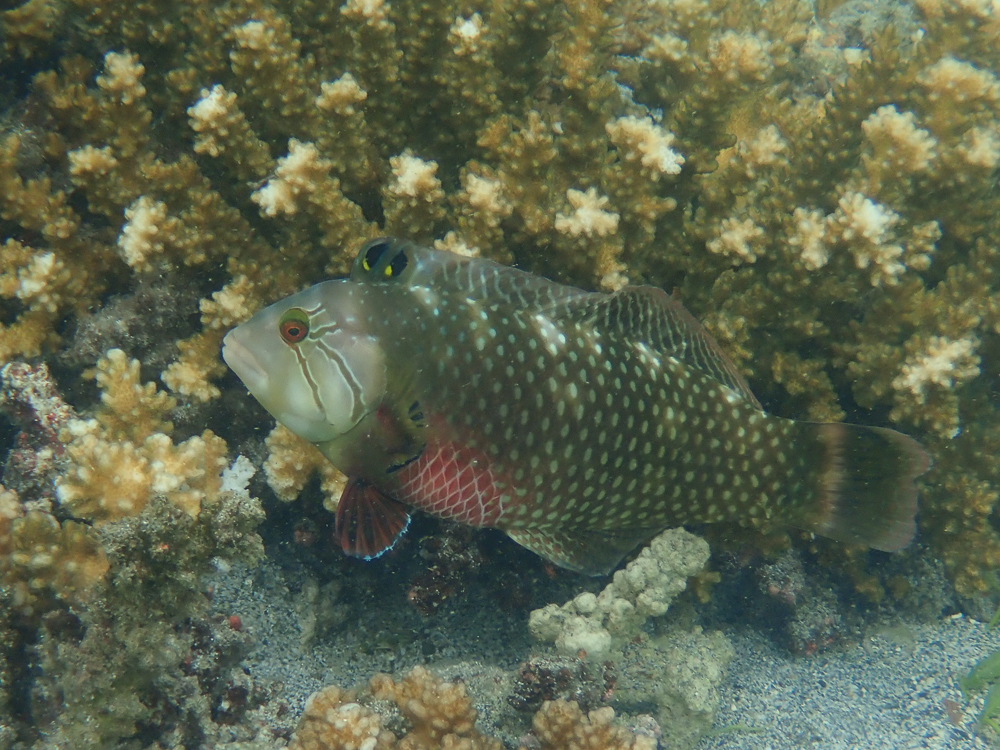
Adult, in Panama

The rockmover wrasse is a colorful fish, 27–30 cm (11–12 in) in length. It has an oblong, laterally compressed body and a wedge-shaped head. Its head is scaleless except for two scales on the upper part of the gill coverings and an almost vertical row of small scales behind each eye.

Juveniles and adults have markedly different appearances. In juveniles, the first two dorsal fin spines are long and extended, drooping over the fish's forehead to form a "cowlick". As the fish matures, the elongated rays are lost. The adult fish has a dark greenish-brown body with an elongated white spot on each scale. Its head is gray-blue with brown lines radiated from the eyes. Two black spots occur in front of the dorsal fin and a wide vertical white bar is found on the base of the caudal fin. The posterior part of the caudal fin and the pelvic fins are black. Juveniles found in Hawaii are usually green and those in the western Pacific are burgundy to brownish. Both are spotted in white.

The difference in appearance between juvenile and adult N. taeniourus is so striking, the common name "rockmover wrasse" is used for adults and "dragon wrasse" is used for juveniles.

Juveniles

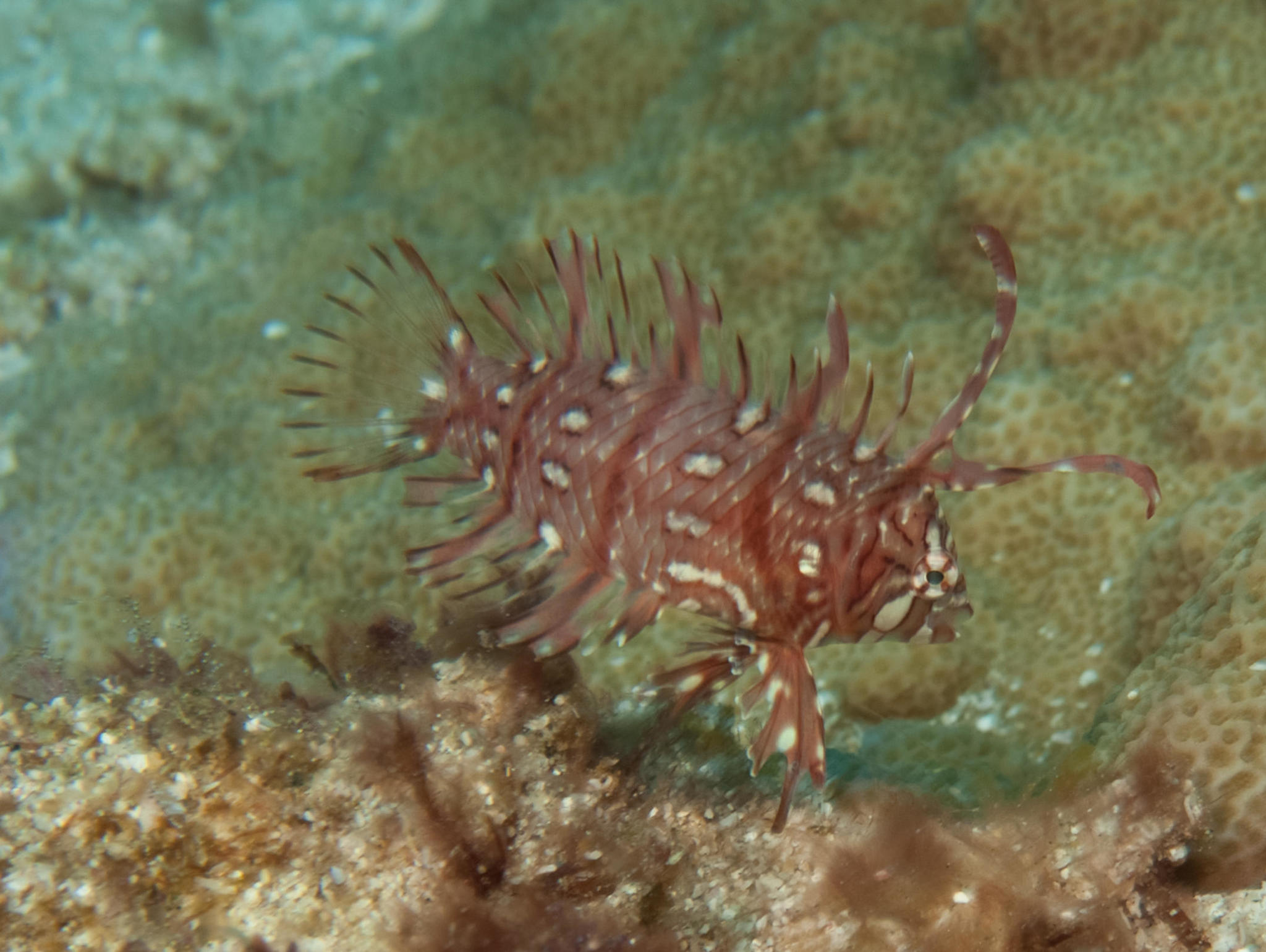
South Africa

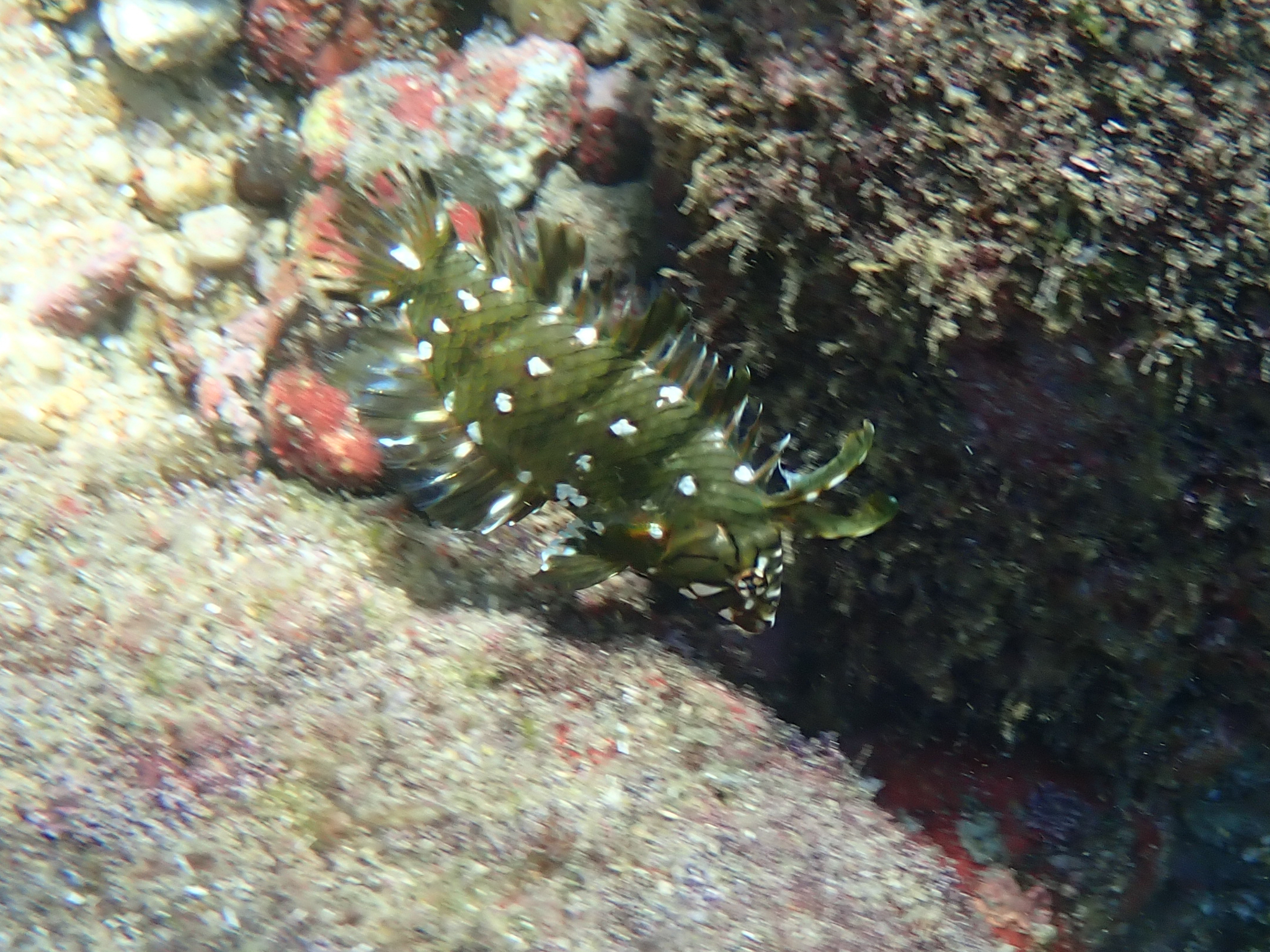
Mexico

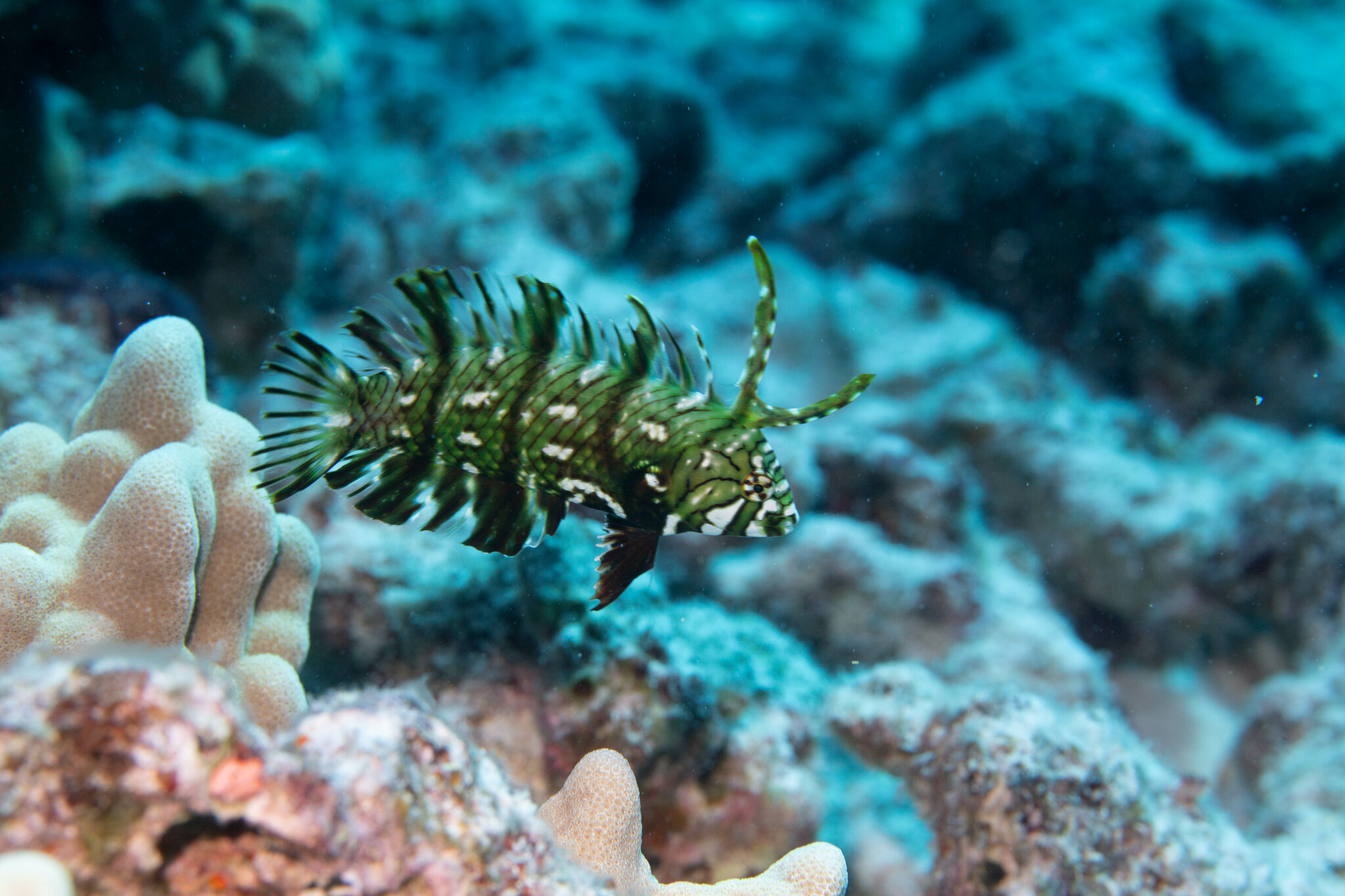
Hawaii

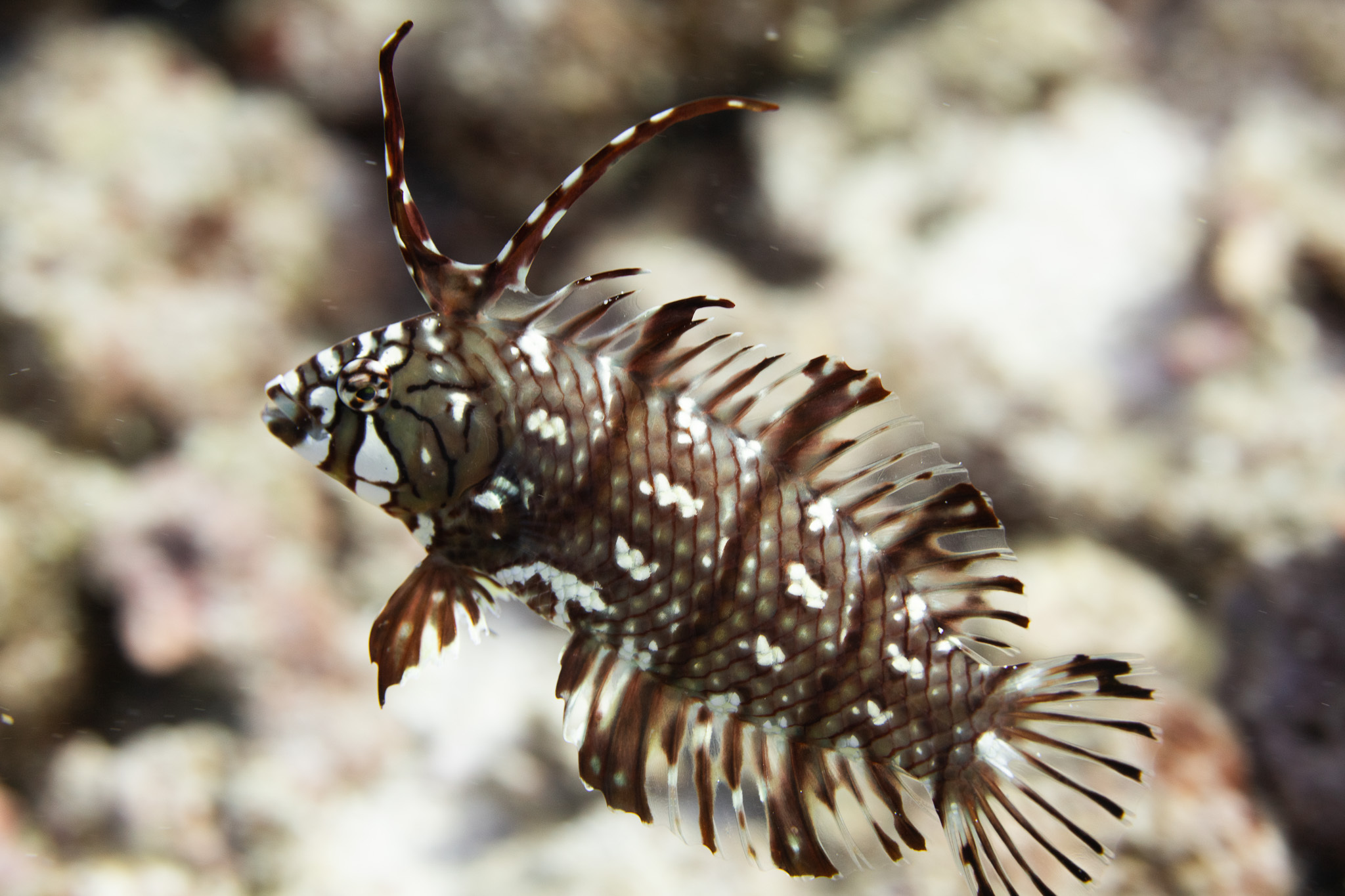
Hawaii

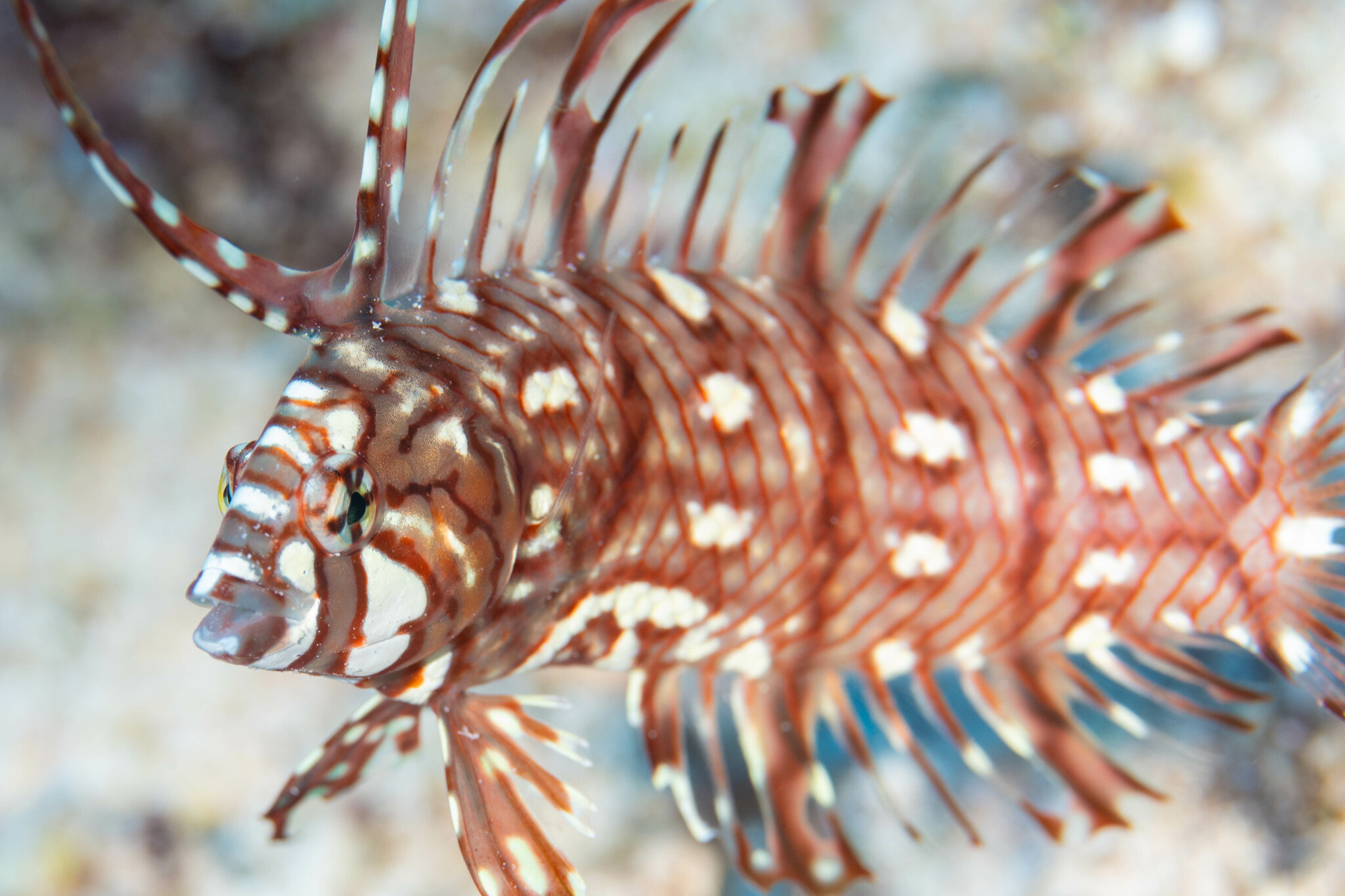
Hawaii

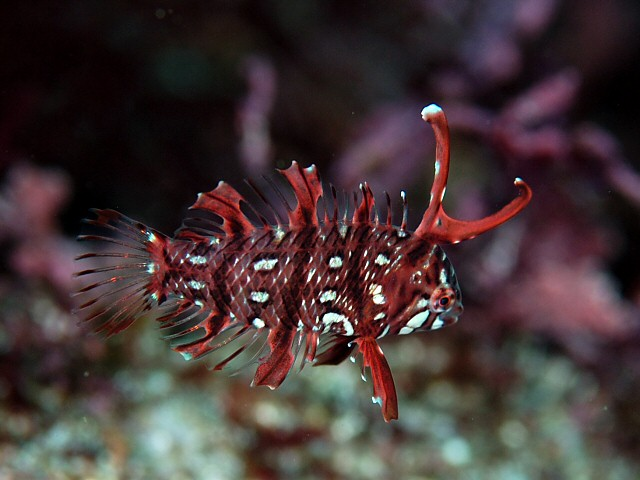
Japan

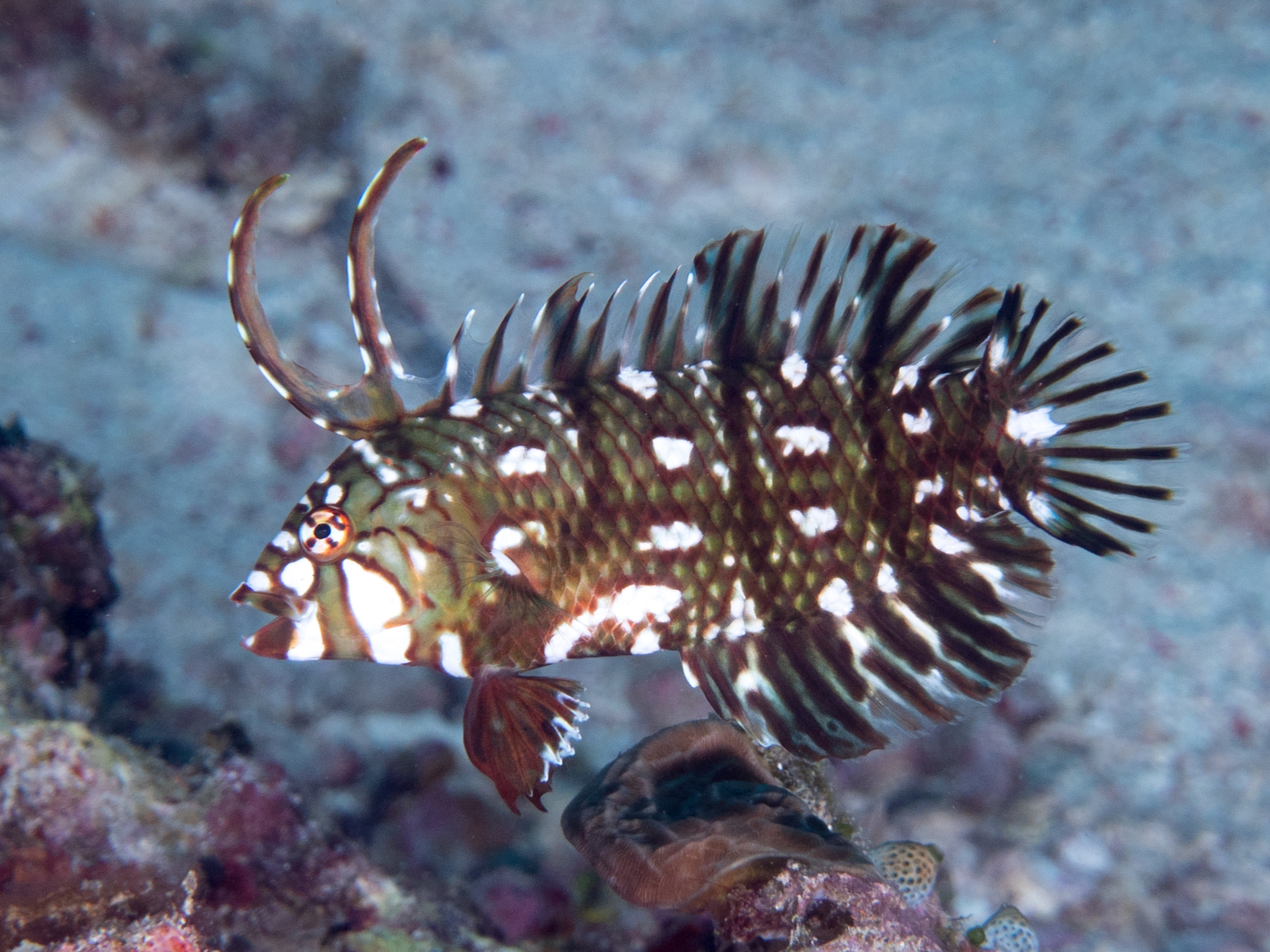
Indonesia

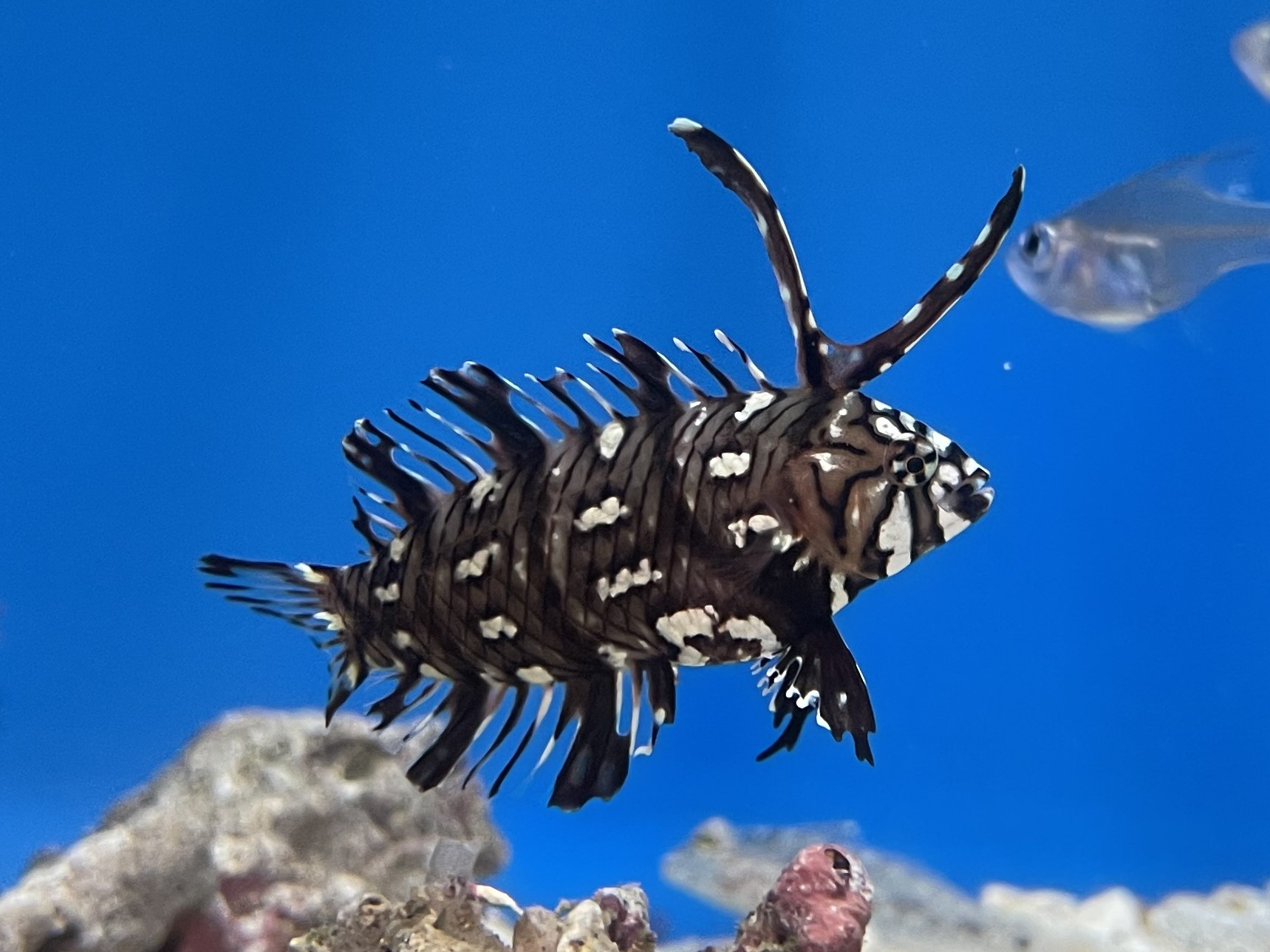
Captivity

== Reproduction ==
Although little is known about reproduction of these fish, like other wrasses, they probably are able to change sex and are pelagic spawners, broadcasting eggs and sperm into the water column.

== Behavior ==
These fish are highly territorial and pairs of adults often protect large areas of reef.

The fish feed on benthic invertebrates including molluscs, crabs and polychaete worms. One fish turns or shifts large pieces of debris or rubble, grabbing or pulling it with its mouth or pushing it with its snout. When the working member of the pair has revealed the prey, the other fish quickly grabs and eats it. Juveniles do not usually work in pairs, doing all the work themselves. Facing danger, these wrasses quickly dive into the sand for protection.

Juveniles resemble algae and mimic the movements of detached, drifting seaweed by swaying back and forth in the currents.

=== Construction of sleeping mounds ===
In Japan, rockmover wrasses have been recorded constructing mounds made of coral fragments and sand to sleep in. Each evening, a wrasse would create a mound of sand, before topping the mound with up to 70 pieces of round or flattened coral fragments. These primarily consist of faviid corals. When moving coral fragments that are too large to be picked, the fish will drag it while swimming backwards. Shortly before sunset, the wrasse will move a few pieces of coral to open up an entrance, before diving into the mound to spend its night.

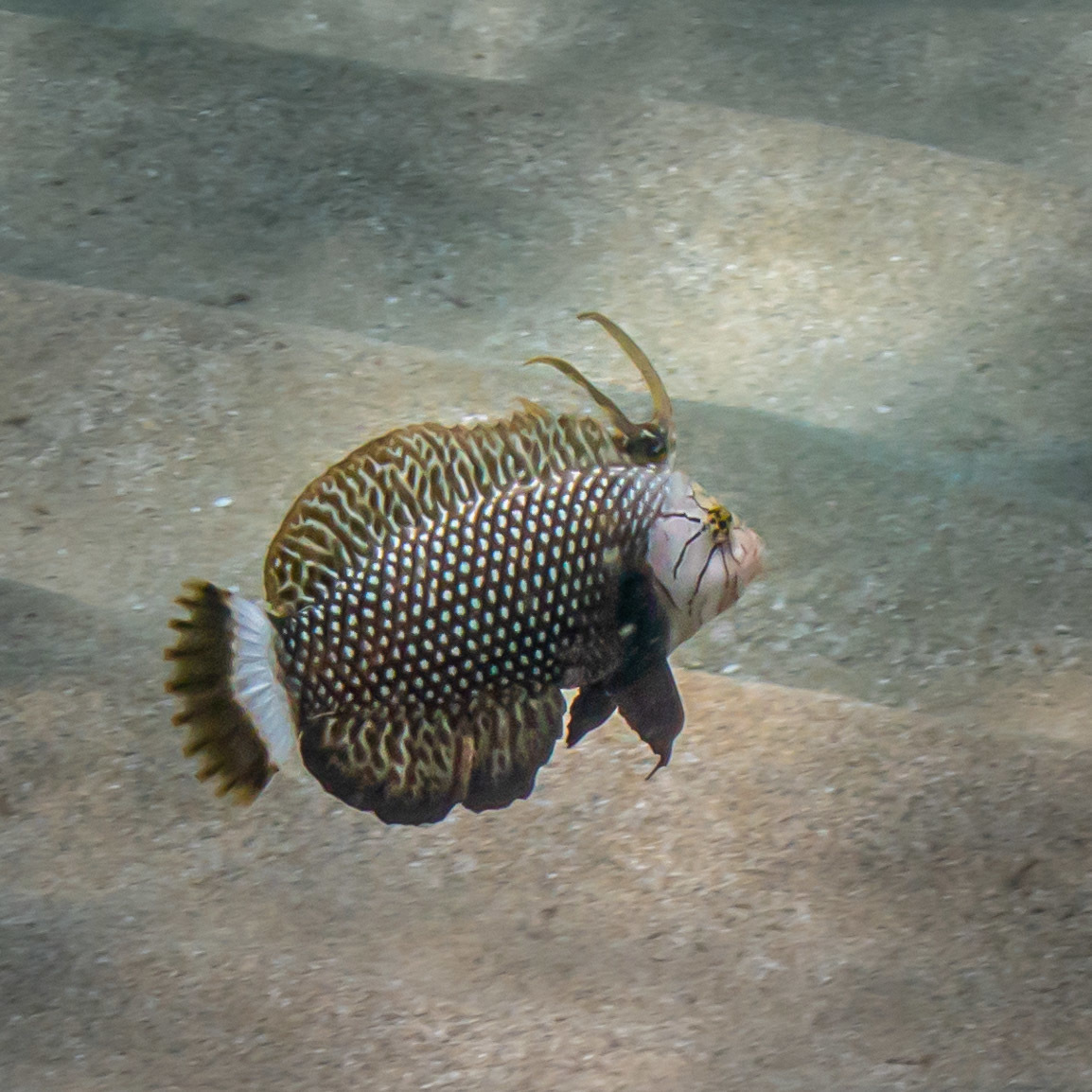
Young adult, in Hawaii

Moving rocks while foraging

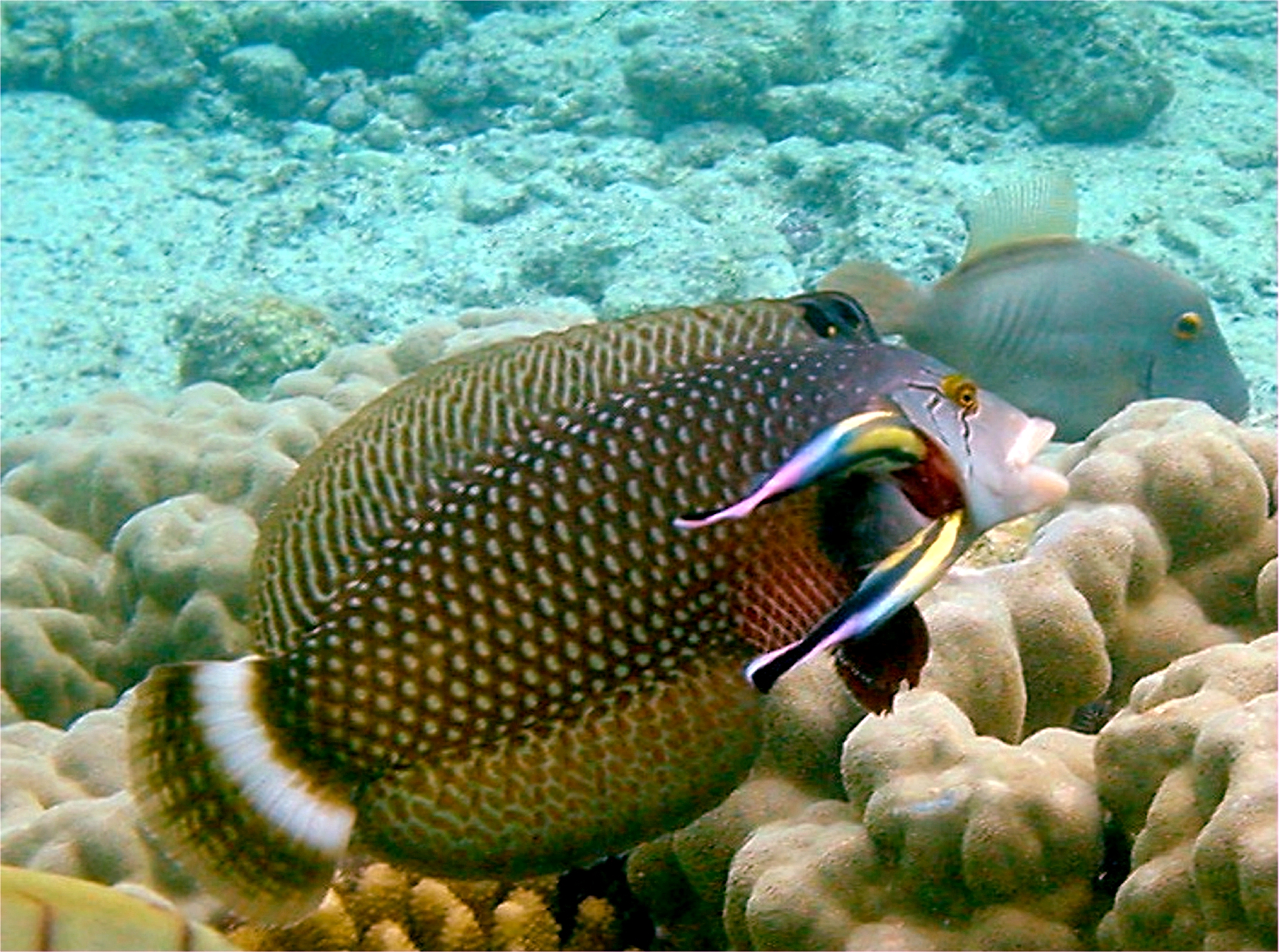
Being attended by Hawaiian cleaner wrasses.
