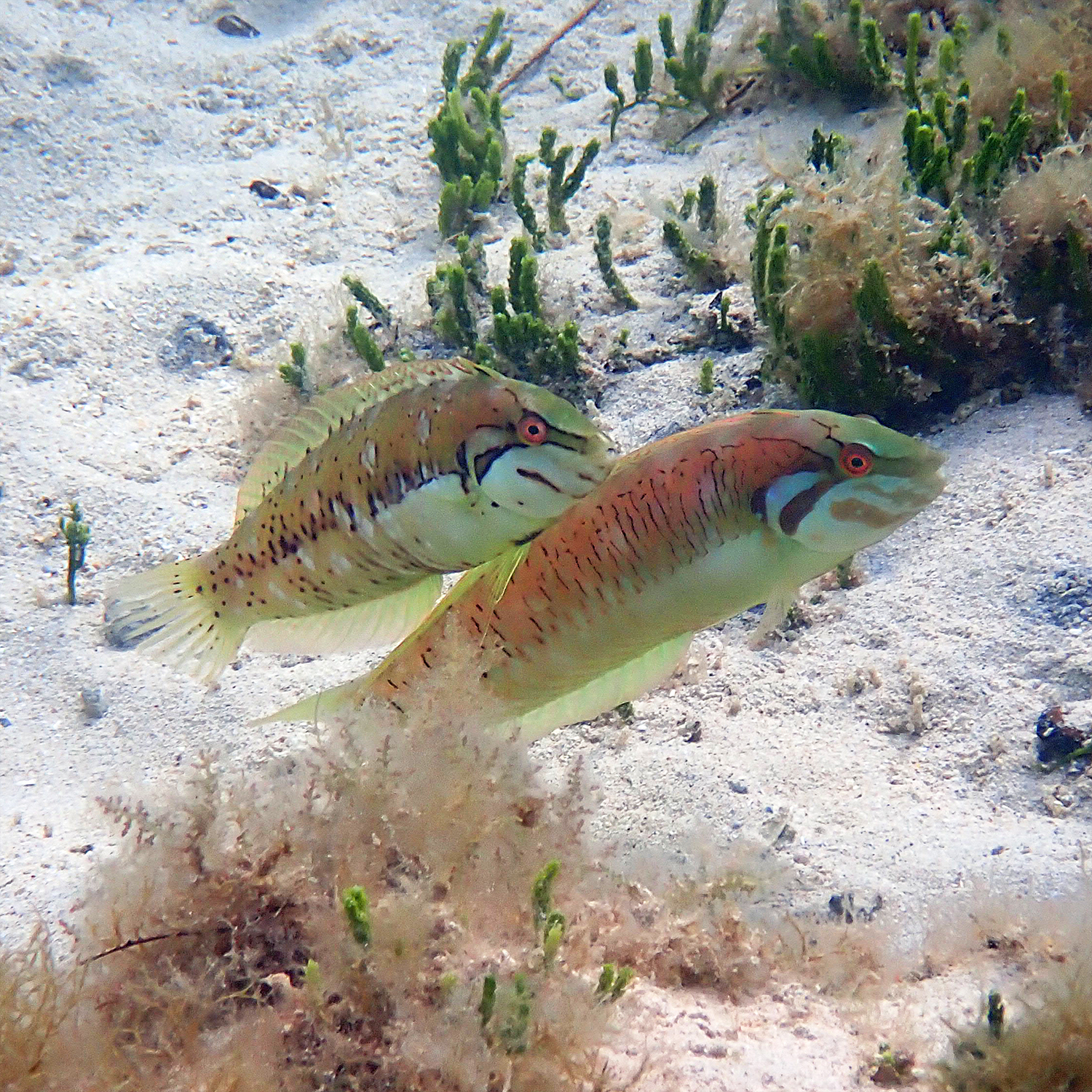

Conservation status
- Least Concern (IUCN 3.1)

Scientific classification
- Kingdom: Animalia
- Phylum: Chordata
- Class: Actinopterygii
- Order: Labriformes
- Family: Labridae
- Subfamily: Xyrichtyinae
- Genus: Novaculoides; Randall & Earle, 2004
- Species: N. macrolepidotus

Binomial name
- Novaculoides macrolepidotus (Bloch, 1791)

Synonyms
- Labrus macrolepidotus Bloch, 1791; Novaculichthys macrolepidotus (Bloch, 1791); Labrus arago Quoy & Gaimard, 1824; Julis trimaculata Valenciennes, 1839; Novacula julioides Bleeker, 1851

= Seagrass wrasse =

Species of fish

The seagrass wrasse (Novaculoides macrolepidotus) is a species of wrasse native to the Indian and the western Pacific Oceans. It grows to 16 cm (6.3 in) in total length, and can be found in the aquarium trade.

== Habitat ==
The seagrass wrasse can be found in lagoons and mangrove forests in seagrass beds or on sandy areas with plentiful algal growth, and occurs at a depth of 0 to 10 m (33 ft).

== Behavior ==
The juveniles and smaller adults of this wrasse are Batesian mimics of the venomous waspfish in the genus Ablabys. When threatened, this wrasse dives headfirst into the sea grass or sea weed beds that it inhabits.
