= Sand wrasse =

Conservation status
- Least Concern (IUCN 3.1)

Scientific classification
- Kingdom: Animalia
- Phylum: Chordata
- Class: Actinopterygii
- Order: Labriformes
- Family: Labridae
- Subfamily: Xyrichtyinae
- Genus: Ammolabrus; J. E. Randall & Carlson, 1997
- Species: A. dicrus

Binomial name
- Ammolabrus dicrus J. E. Randall & Carlson, 1997

Species of fish

The sand wrasse, Ammolabrus dicrus, is a species of wrasse endemic to Oahu, Hawaii. They prefer open, sandy substrates, where they hunt for zooplankton near the ocean floor. They can be found at depths of 7 to 18 m (20 to 60 ft) in small schools. This species grows to a length of 9.4 cm (3.7 in). This species is the only known member of its genus.
