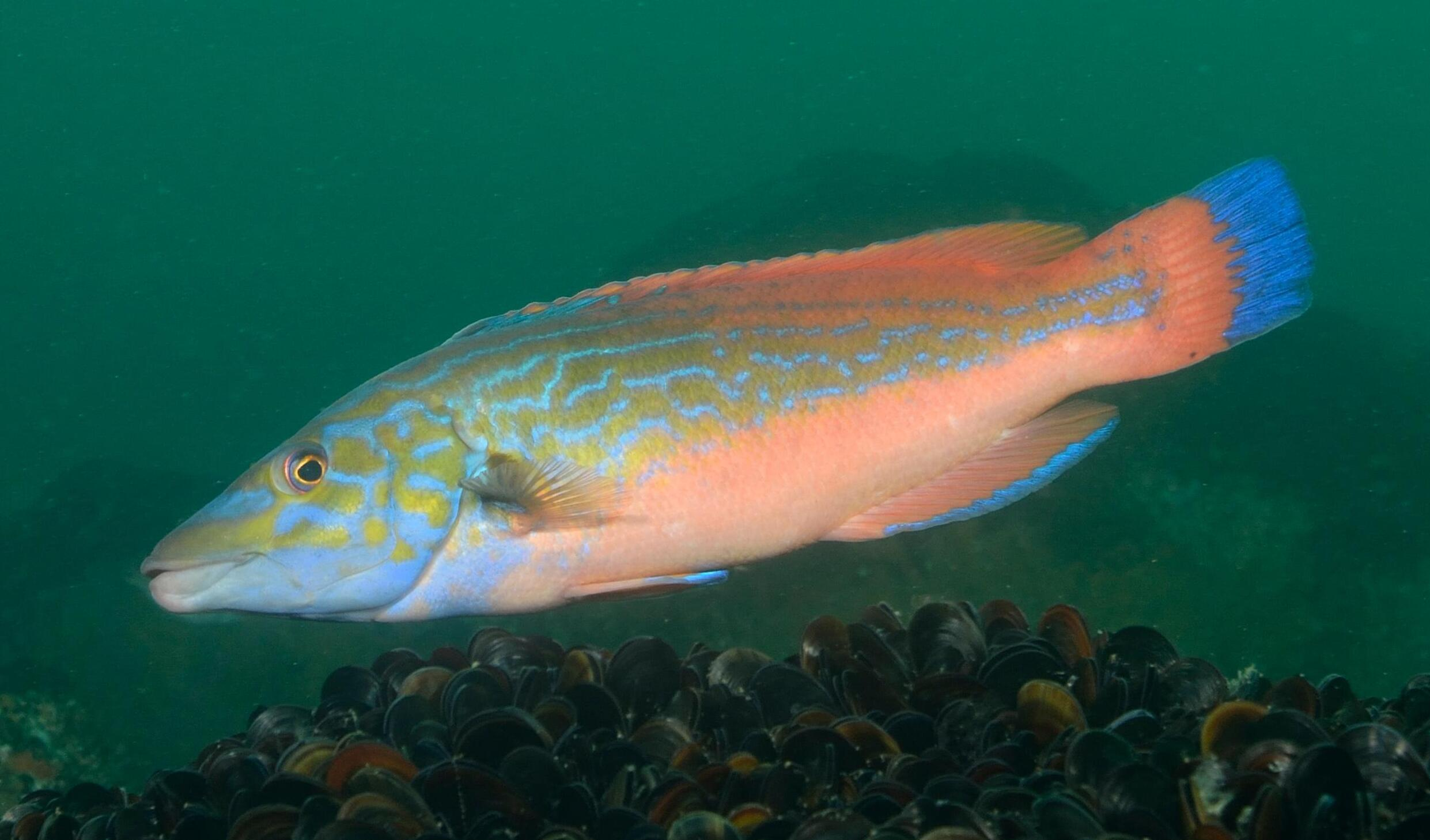
- Cuckoo wrasse (Labrus mixtus)

Scientific classification
- Kingdom: Animalia
- Phylum: Chordata
- Class: Actinopterygii
- Division: Teleostei
- Order: Labriformes
- Suborder: Labroidei
- Family: Labridae; G. Cuvier, 1816

Subfamilies
- Cheilininae; Cirrhilabrinae; Hypsigenyinae; Julidinae; Labrinae; Pseudolabrinae; Scarinae; Xyrichtyinae

= Wrasse =

Wrasses Temporal range: Early Eocene to present

Family of ray-finned fishes

The wrasses are a family, Labridae, of marine ray-finned fish, many of which are brightly colored. The family is large and diverse, with over 600 species in 81 genera, which are divided into eight subfamilies.

They are typically small, most of them less than 20 cm (7.9 in) long, although the largest, the humphead wrasse, can measure up to 2.5 m (8.2 ft). They are efficient carnivores, feeding on a wide range of small invertebrates. Many smaller wrasses follow the feeding trails of larger fish, picking up invertebrates disturbed by their passing. Juveniles of some representatives of the genera Bodianus, Epibulus, Cirrhilabrus, Oxycheilinus, and Paracheilinus hide among the tentacles of the free-living mushroom corals and Heliofungia actiniformis.

== Etymology ==
The word "wrasse" comes from the Cornish word wragh, a lenited form of gwragh, meaning an old woman or hag, via Cornish dialect wrath. It is related to the Welsh gwrach and Breton gwrac'h.

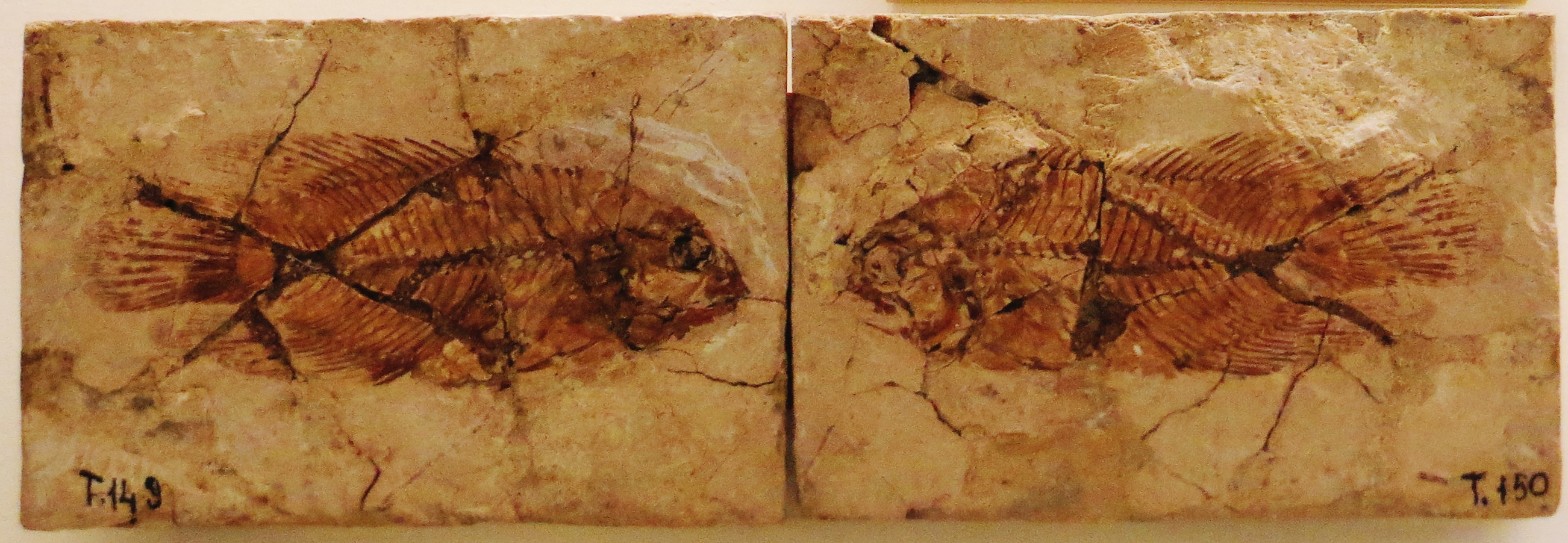
†Phyllopharyngodon longipinnis (Eocene)

== Taxonomy ==
Parrotfish were traditionally regarded as comprising their own family (Scaridae), but are now often treated as a subfamily (Scarinae) or tribe (Scarini) of the wrasses (Labridae), being nested deep within the wrasse phylogenetic tree. The odacine wrasses, traditionally classified as forming their own family, were found nested deep within the wrasse tribe Hypsigenyini, and most closely related to the tuskfishes.

=== Genera ===
The following classification is based on Eschmeyer's Catalog of Fishes:

Subfamily	Genera
Hypsigenyinae	Achoerodus, Anchichoerops, Bodianus, Choerodon, Decodon, Lachnolaimus, Polylepion, Pseudodax, Terelabrus, Haletta, Heteroscarus, Neoodax, Odax, Parodax, Olisthops, Sheardichthys, Siphonognathus.
Cirrhilabrinae	Cirrhilabrus, Paracheilinus, Pseudocheilinops, Pseudocheilinus, Pteragogus.
Labrinae	Acantholabrus, Centrolabrus, Ctenolabrus, Labrus, Lappanella, Symphodus, Tautoga, Tautogolabrus
Cheilininae	Cheilinus, Epibulus, Oxycheilinus, Wetmorella.
Scarinae	Bolbometopon, Calotomus, Cetoscarus, Chlorurus, Cryptotomus, Hipposcarus, Leptoscarus, Nicholsina, Scarus, Sparisoma.
Xyrichtyinae	Ammolabrus, Cheilio, Cymolutes, Iniistius, Novaculichthys, Novaculoides, Novaculops, Xyrichtys
Pseudolabrinae	Austrolabrus, Doratonotus, Dotalabrus, Eupetrichthys, Malapterus, Notolabrus, Pictilabrus, Pseudolabrus, Suezichthys
Julidinae	Anampses, Coris, Diproctacanthus, Frontilabrus, Gomphosus, Halichoeres, Hemigymnus, Hologymnosus, Labrichthys, Labroides, Labropsis, Larabicus, Leptojulis, Macropharyngodon, Minilabrus, Ophthalmolepis, Parajulis, Pseudocoris, Pseudojuloides, Stethojulis, Thalassoma, Xenojulis.

The following fossil genera are also known, lacking a proper subfamiliar or tribal placement:

- †Bellwoodilabrus Bannikov & Carnevale, 2010 (Early Eocene of Italy)
- †Eocoris Bannikov & Soribini, 2010 (Early Eocene of Italy)
- †Labrobolcus Bannikov & Bellwood, 2015 (Early Eocene of Italy)
- ?†Paralabrus Bannikov & Zorzini, 2019 (Early Eocene of Italy)
- †Wainwrightilabrus Carnevale, 2015 (Middle Miocene of Austria)
- †Zorzinilabrus Bannikov & Bellwood, 2017 (Early Eocene of Italy)

Fossil wrasses date to the Early Eocene of Monte Bolca, Italy. Among these is Phyllopharyngodon, which can uniquely be placed in the extant subfamily Hypsigenyinae. Wrasses appear to have had an even wider distribution in prehistoric times, with fossil remains being known from the Middle Eocene-aged La Meseta Formation of Antarctica. They were presumably wiped out from Antarctica following the continent's cooling during the Oligocene.

== Description ==
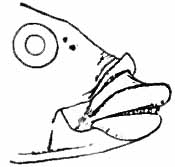
Lips of Labrus festivus

Wrasses have protractile mouths, usually with separate jaw teeth that jut outwards. Many species can be readily recognized by their thick lips, the inside of which is sometimes curiously folded, a peculiarity which gave rise to the German name of "lip-fishes" (Lippfische), and the Dutch name of lipvissen. The dorsal fin has 8 to 21 spines and 6 to 21 soft rays, usually running most of the length of the back. Wrasses are sexually dimorphic. Many species are capable of changing sex. Juveniles are a mix of males and females (known as initial-phase individuals), but the largest adults become territory-holding (terminal-phase) males.

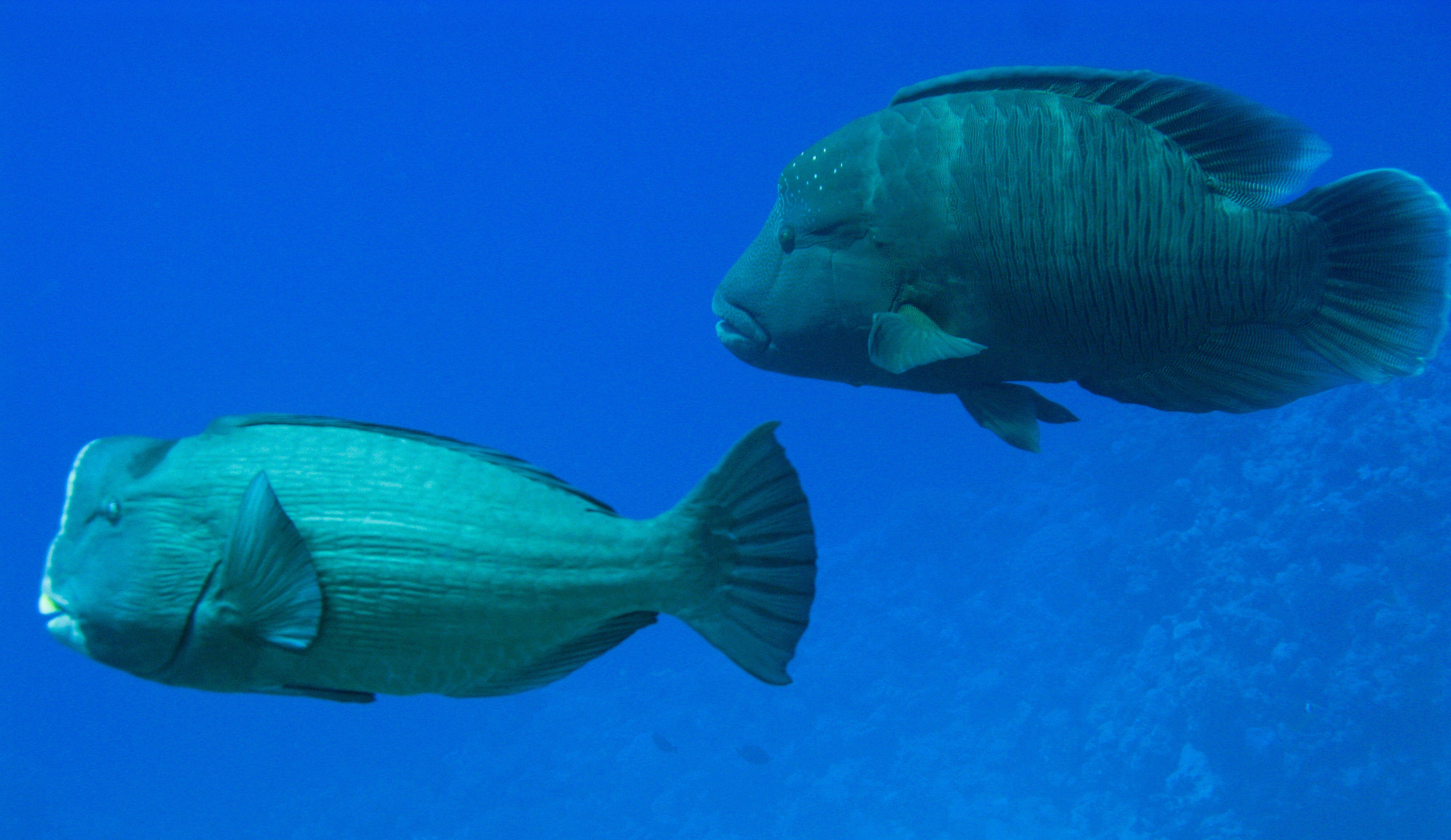
Two very large wrasse species: humphead parrotfish (left) and humphead wrasse (right)

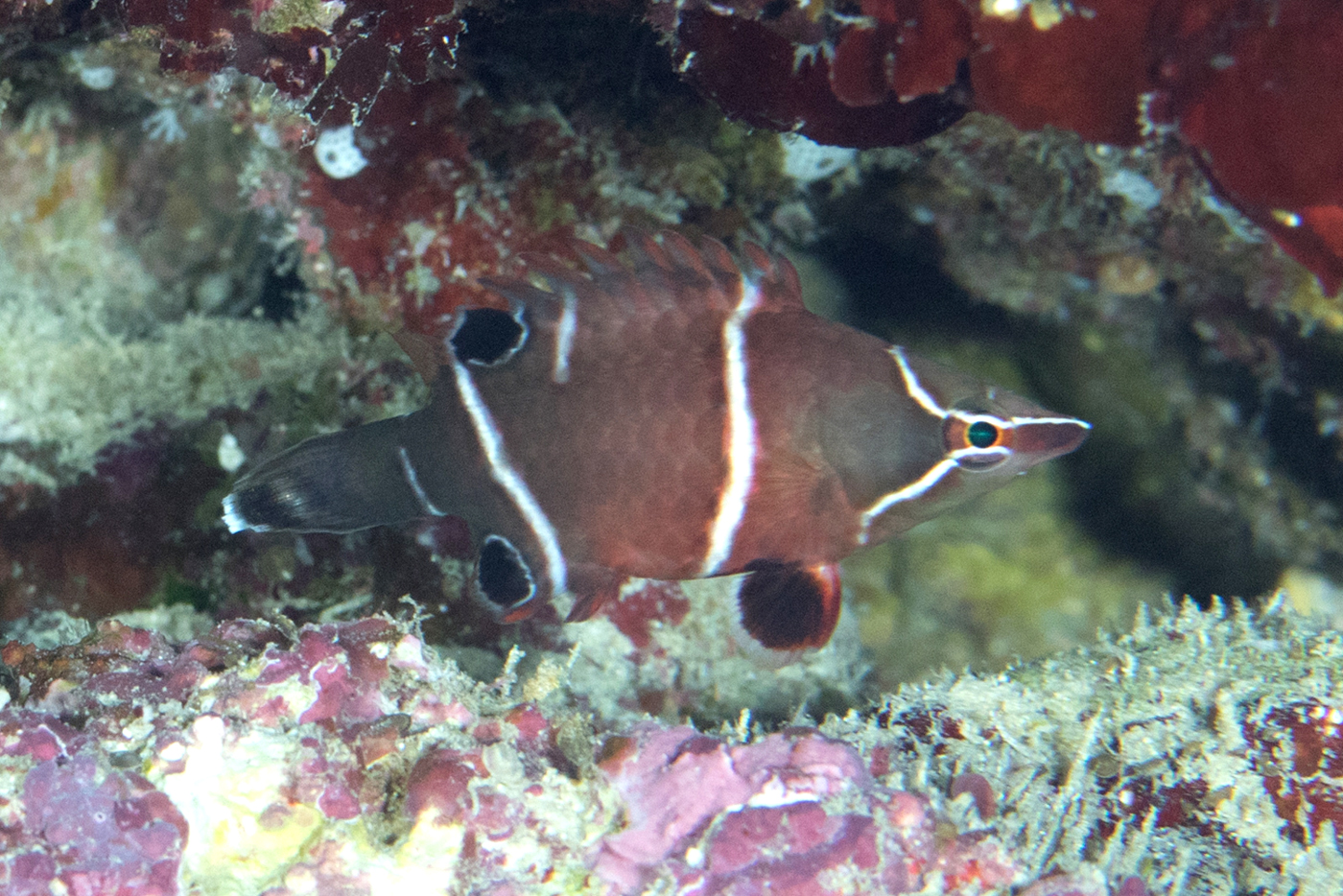
Whitebanded possum wrasse (Wetmorella albofasciata), one of the smallest wrasse species

The wrasses have become a primary study species in fish-feeding biomechanics due to their jaw structures. The nasal and mandibular bones are connected at their posterior ends to the rigid neurocranium, and the superior and inferior articulations of the maxilla are joined to the anterior tips of these two bones, respectively, creating a loop of four rigid bones connected by moving joints. This "four-bar linkage" has the property of allowing numerous arrangements to achieve a given mechanical result (fast jaw protrusion or a forceful bite), thus decoupling morphology from function. The actual morphology of wrasses reflects this, with many lineages displaying different jaw morphology that results in the same functional output in a similar or identical ecological niche.

== Distribution and habitat ==
Most wrasses inhabit the tropical and subtropical waters of the Atlantic, Indian, and Pacific Oceans, though some species live in temperate waters: the Ballan wrasse is found as far north as Norway. Wrasses are usually found in shallow-water habitats such as coral reefs and rocky shores, where they live close to the substrate.

== Reproductive behavior ==
Most labrids are protogynous hermaphrodites within a haremic mating system. A good example of this reproductive behavior is seen in the California sheephead. Hermaphroditism allows for complex mating systems. Labroids exhibit three different mating systems: polygynous, lek-like, and promiscuous. Group spawning and pair spawning occur within mating systems. The type of spawning that occurs depends on male body size. Labroids typically exhibit broadcast spawning, releasing high numbers of planktonic eggs, which are broadcast by tidal currents; adult labroids have no interaction with offspring. Wrasses of a particular subgroup of the family Labridae, Labrini, do not exhibit broadcast spawning.

Sex change in wrasses is generally female-to-male, but experimental conditions have allowed for male-to-female sex change. Placing two male Labroides dimidiatus wrasses in the same tank results in the smaller of the two becoming female again. Additionally, while the individual to change sex is generally the largest female, evidence also exists of the largest female instead "choosing" to remain female in situations in which she can maximize her evolutionary fitness by refraining from changing sex.

=== Broodcare behavior of the tribe ===
The subfamily Labrinae arose from a basal split within family Labridae during the Eocene period. Subgroup Labrinae is composed of eight genera, wherein 15 of 23 species exhibit broodcare behavior, which ranges from simple to complex parental care of spawn; males build algae nests or crude cavities, ventilate eggs, and defend nests against conspecific males and predators. In species that express this behavior, eggs cannot survive without parental care. Species of Symphodus, Centrolabrus, and Labrus genera exhibit broodcare behavior.

== Sexual developmental systems ==
Wrasses exhibit three types of sexual development, depending on the species. Sex in this context refers to functional sex, ie the individual's role when mating. Some species show functional gonochorism, meaning that they are born functionally either male or female, and remain so for their entire life; there is no sex change. Meanwhile, functionally hermaphroditic species exhibit sex change, and are protogynous, meaning that individuals that are functionally female can become functionally male. These protogynous species are either monandric (all individuals are born functionally female, but can become functionally male) or diandric (individuals can be born either female or male, and individuals that are born female can become male).

Evolutionarily, wrasse lineages trend towards developing monandry. Monandric lineages rarely transition directly to diandry, instead transitioning through functional gonochorism first on the pathway to diandry.

== Potential tool use ==
Many species of wrasses have been recorded using large rocks or hard coral as "anvils", upon which they smash open hard-shelled prey items. At least some of these species can remember to use a particular rock or coral repeatedly for this purpose. This behaviour usually involves invertebrate prey such as clams, sea urchins, and crabs, but on one occasion, a blue tuskfish was filmed smashing a young green sea turtle on an anvil.

Twenty-one species of eight genera have been documented exhibiting this behaviour, including Choerodon (C. anchorago, C. cyanodus, C. graphicus, C. schoenleinii), Coris (C. aygula, C. bulbifrons, C. julis, C. sandeyeri), Cheilinus (C. fasciatus, C. lunulatus, C. trilobatus), Thalassoma (T. hardwicke, T. jansenii, T. lunare, T. lutescens, T. pavo), Symphodus (S. mediterraneus), Halichoeres (H. garnoti, H. hortulanus), Bodianus (B. pulcher), and Pseudolabrus (P. luculentus).

== Cleaner wrasse ==
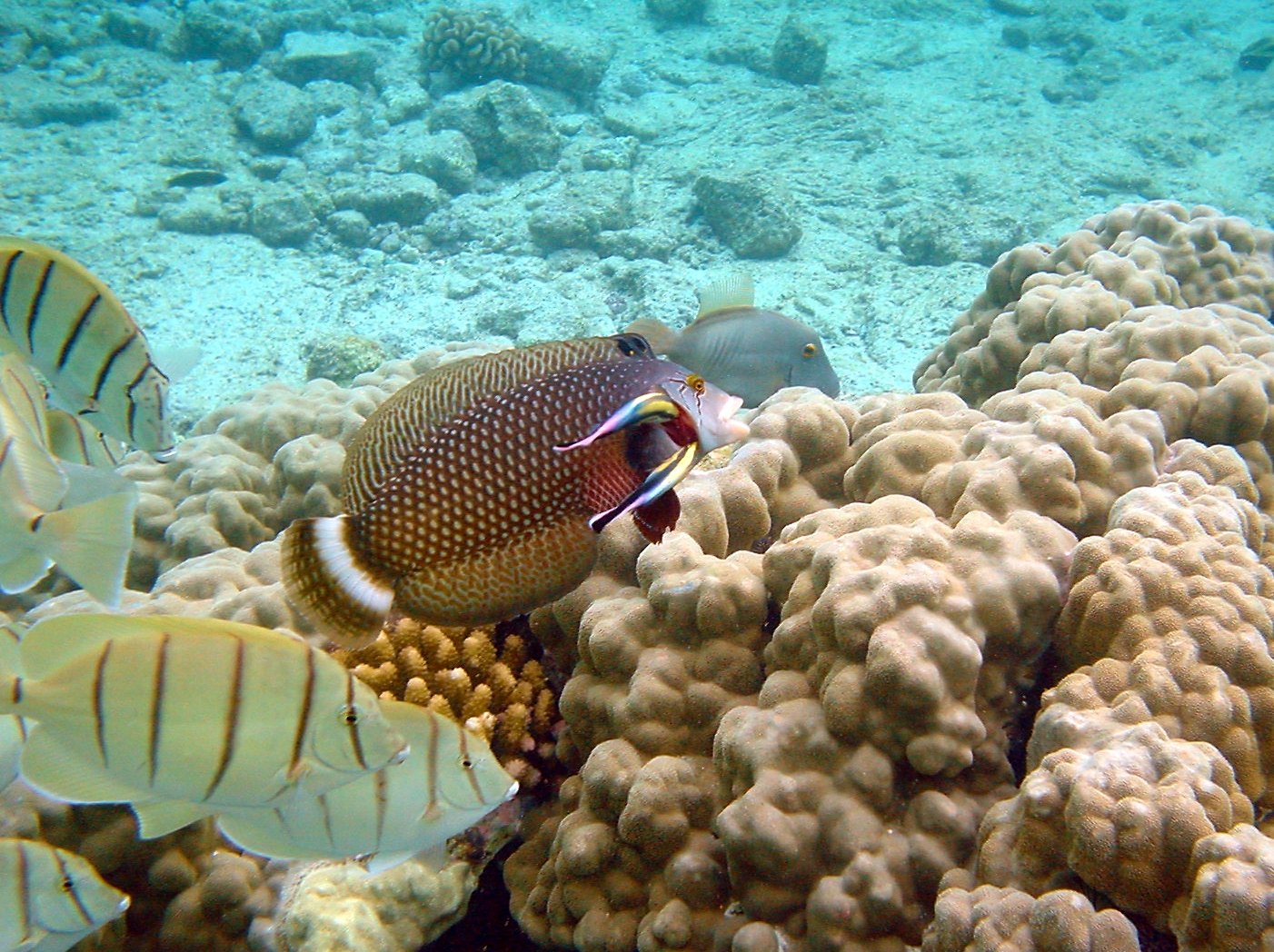
Hawaiian cleaner wrasses working on gill area of dragon wrasse Novaculichthys taeniourus, on a reef in Hawaii

Cleaner wrasses are the best-known of the cleaner fish. They live in a cleaning symbiosis with larger, often predatory, fish, grooming them and benefiting by consuming what they remove. "Client" fish congregate at wrasse "cleaning stations" and wait for the cleaner fish to remove gnathiid parasites, the cleaners even swimming into their open mouths and gill cavities to do so.

Cleaner wrasses are best known for feeding on dead tissue, scales, and ectoparasites, although they are also known to 'cheat', consuming healthy tissue and mucus, which is energetically costly for the client fish to produce. The bluestreak cleaner wrasse, Labroides dimidiatus, is one of the most common cleaners found on tropical reefs. Few cleaner wrasses have been observed being eaten by predators, possibly because predator survival is more important than the parasite removal.

In a 2019 study, cleaner wrasses passed the mirror test, the first fish to do so. However, the test's inventor, American psychologist Gordon G. Gallup, has said that the fish were most likely trying to scrape off a perceived parasite on another fish and that they did not demonstrate self-recognition. The authors of the study retorted that because the fish checked themselves in the mirror before and after the scraping, this meant that the fish had self-awareness and recognized that their reflections belonged to their own bodies. In a 2024 study, "mirror-naive" bluestreak cleaner wrasse were reported to initially show aggression to wrasse photographs sized 10% larger or 10% smaller than themselves, regardless of size. However, upon viewing their reflections in a mirror, they avoided confronting photographs 10% larger than they were.

== Significance to humans ==
In the Western Atlantic coastal region of North America, the most common food species for indigenous humans was the tautog, a species of wrasse. Wrasses today are commonly found in both public and home aquaria. Some species are small enough to be considered reef safe. They may also be employed as cleaner fish to combat sea-lice infestations in salmon farms. Commercial fish farming of cleaner wrasse for sea-lice pest control in commercial salmon farming has developed in Scotland as lice busters, with apparent commercial benefit and viability.

== Parasites ==
As all fish, labrids are the hosts of a number of parasites. A list of 338 parasite taxa from 127 labrid fish species was provided by Muñoz and Diaz in 2015. An example is the nematode Huffmanela ossicola.

== Gallery ==
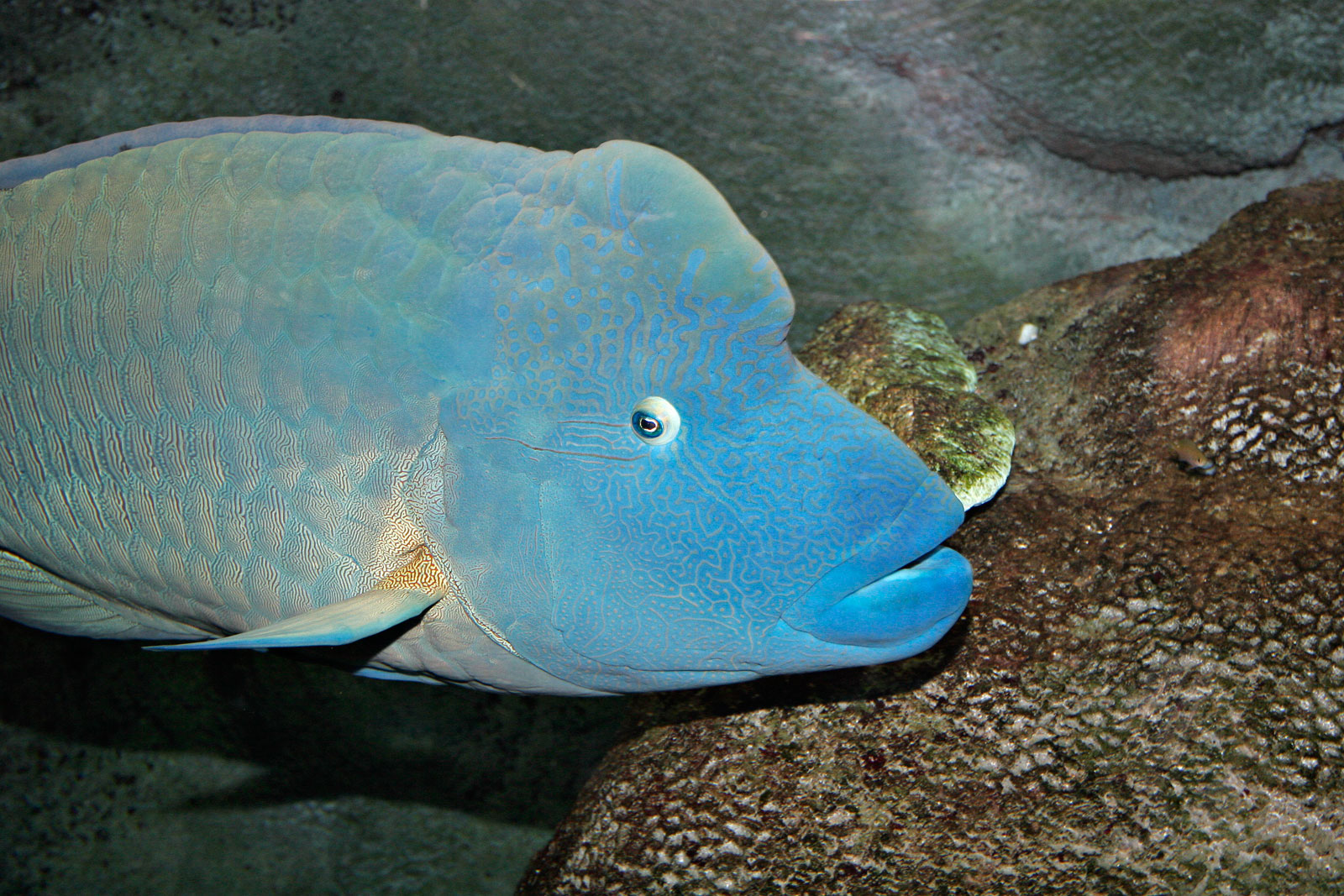
Humphead wrasse, Cheilinus undulatus, Melbourne Aquarium

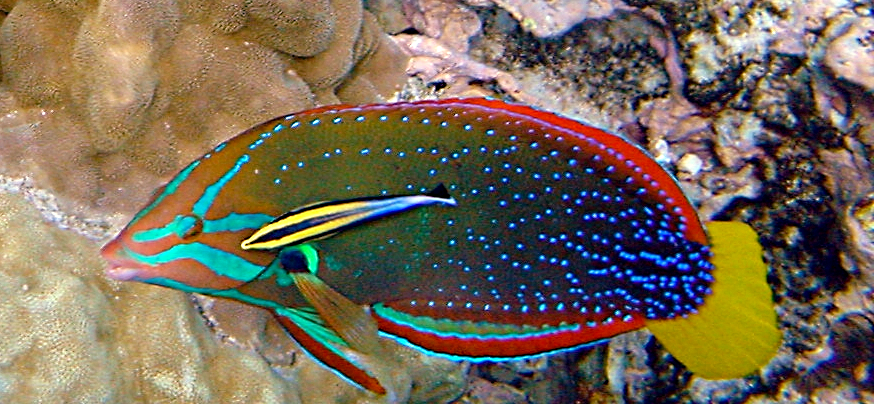
A yellowtail coris wrasse, Coris gaimard, is being cleaned by Labroides phthirophagus in Hawaii.

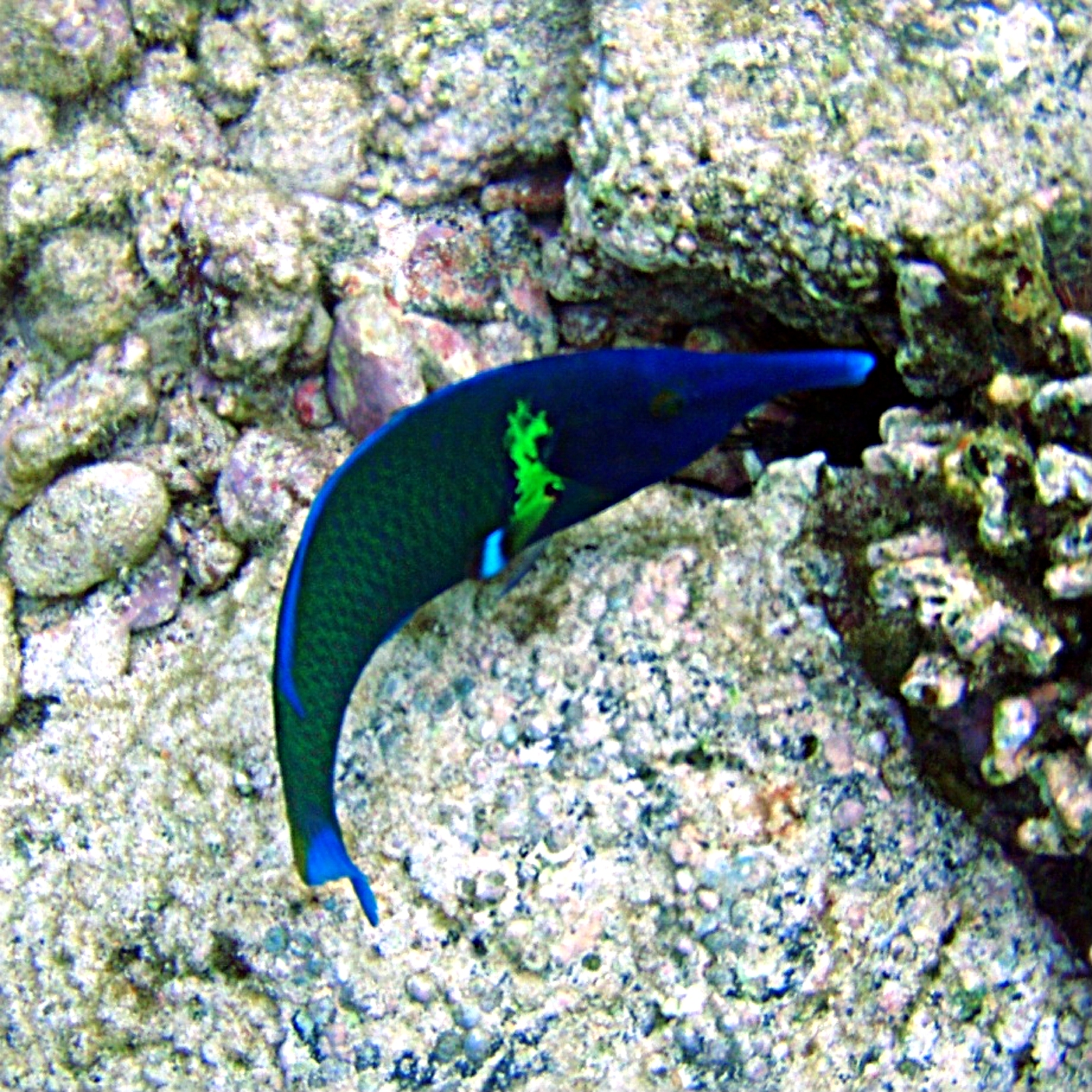
Bird wrasse, Gomphosus varius, Kona (Hawaii)

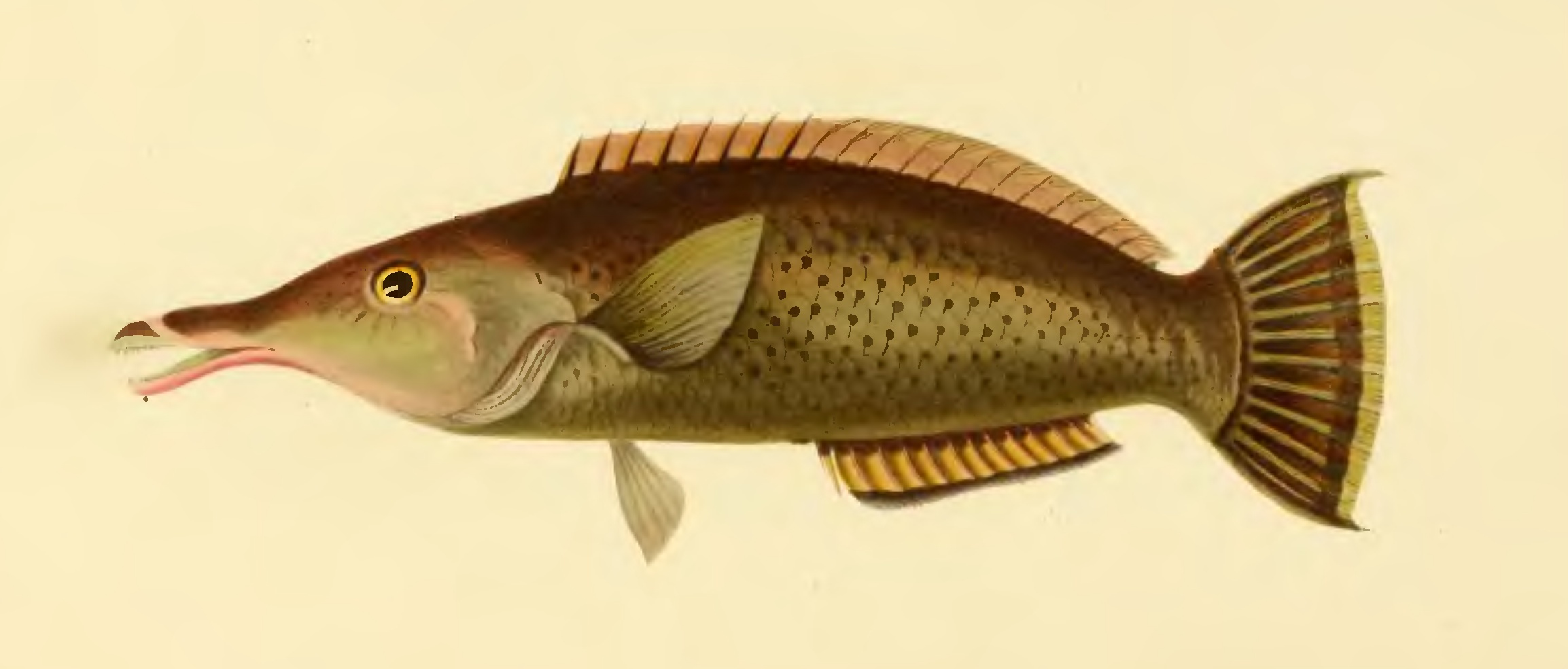
Gomphosus varius

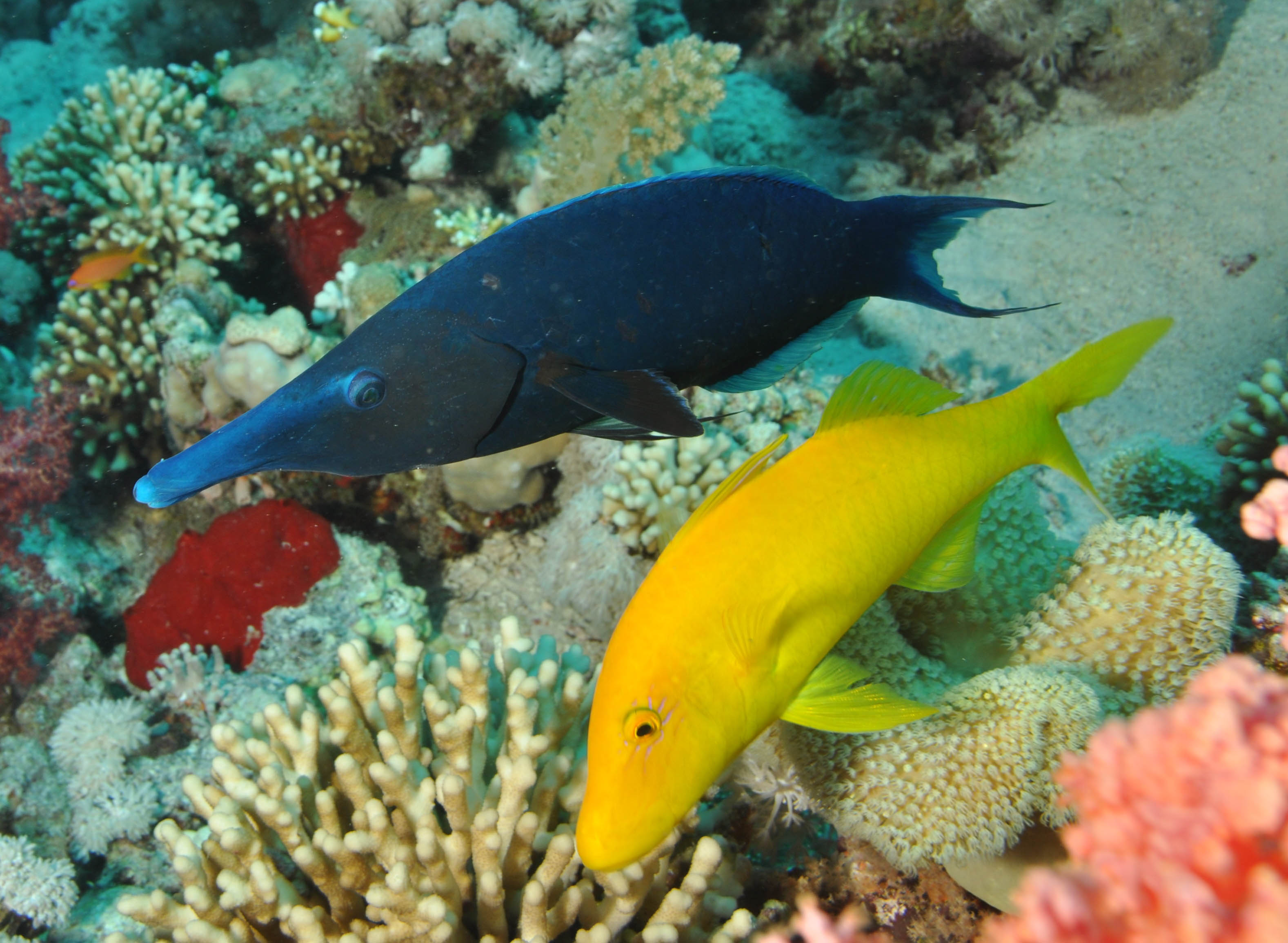
Gomphosus caeruleus swimming with a yellow goatfish

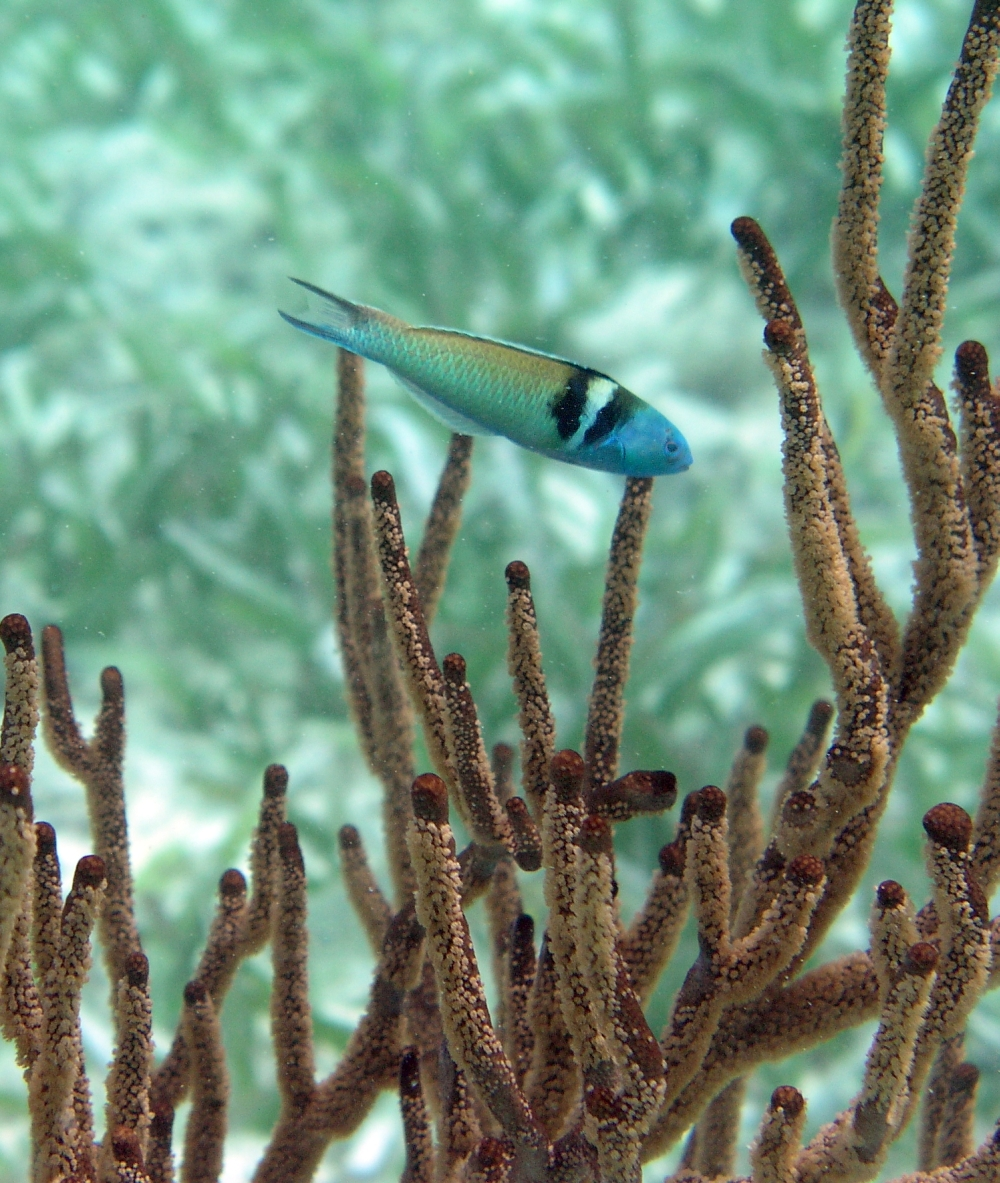
Bluehead wrasse, Belize Barrier Reef

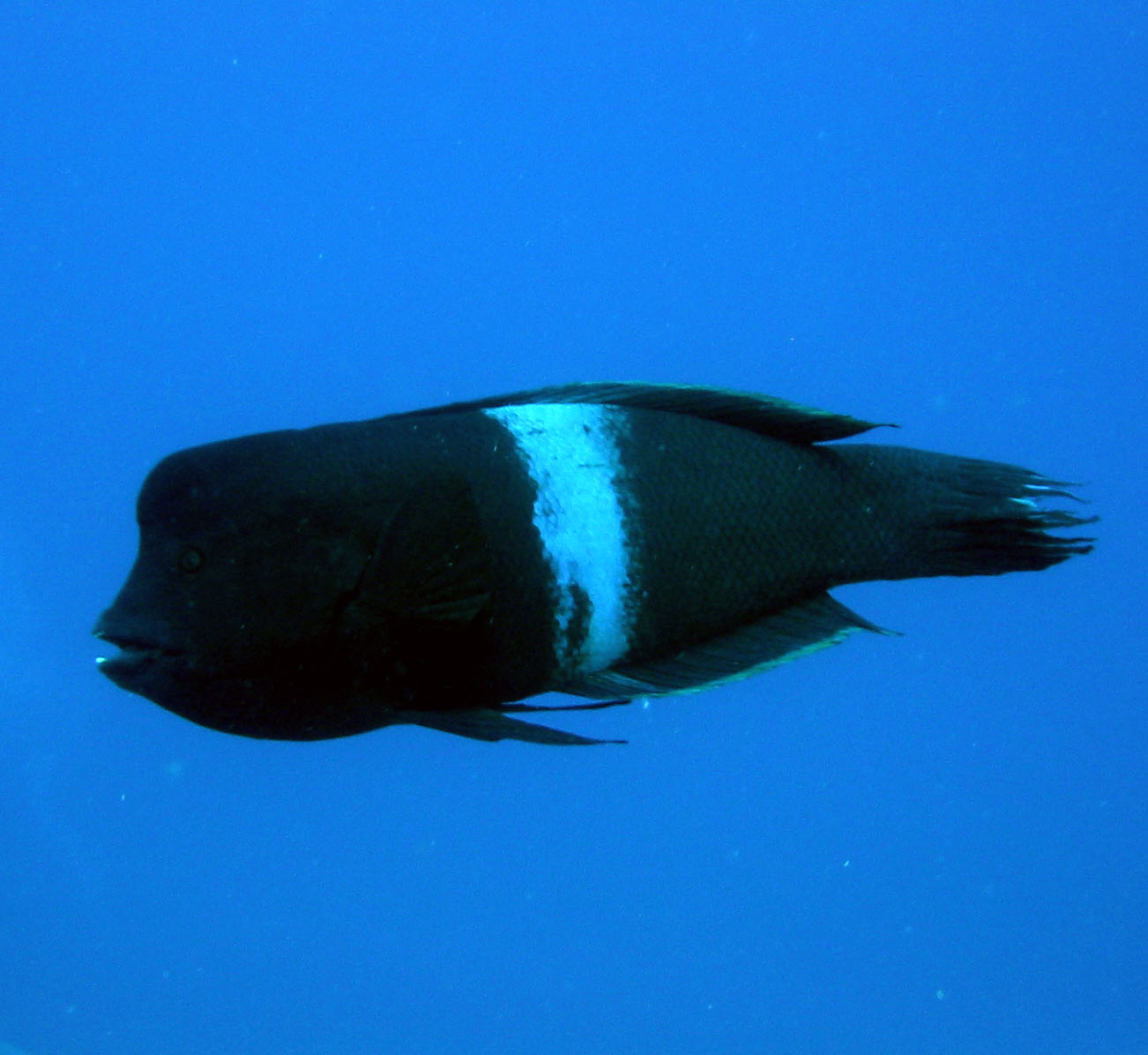
Clown wrasse, Coris aygula, Red Sea

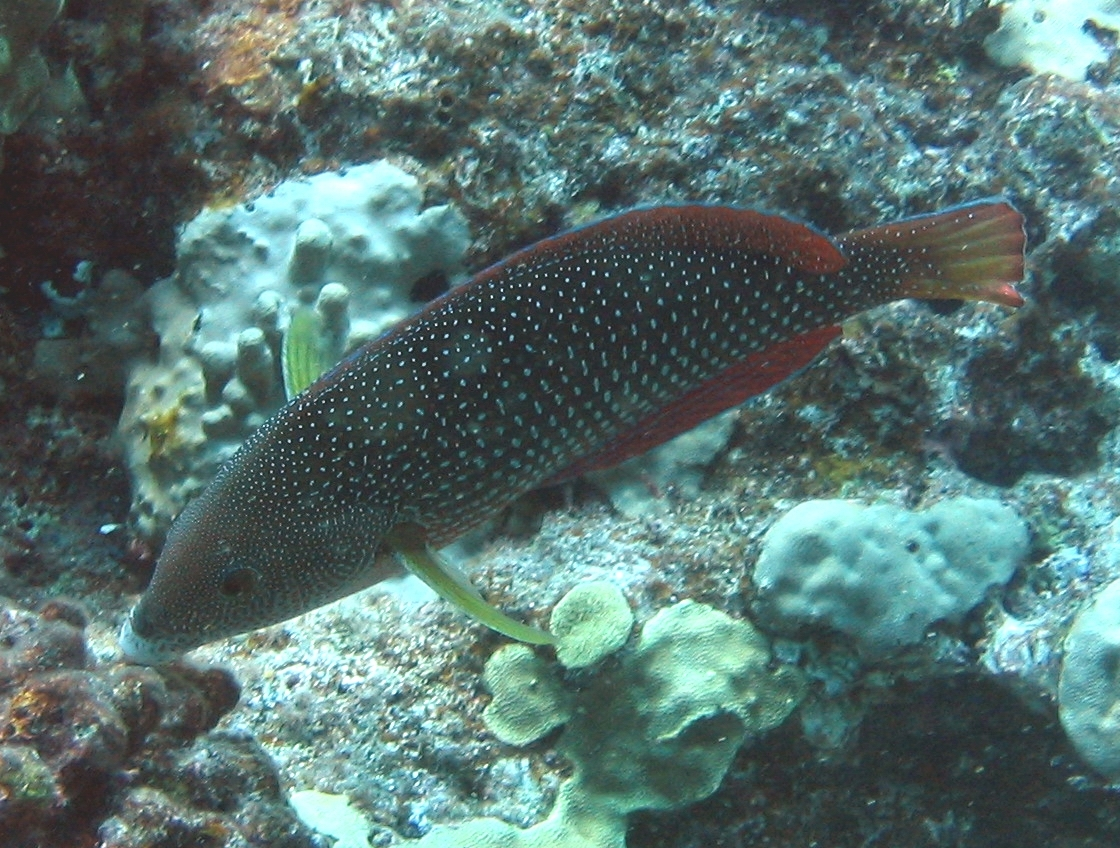
Pearl wrasse, Anampses cuvieri, Hawaii

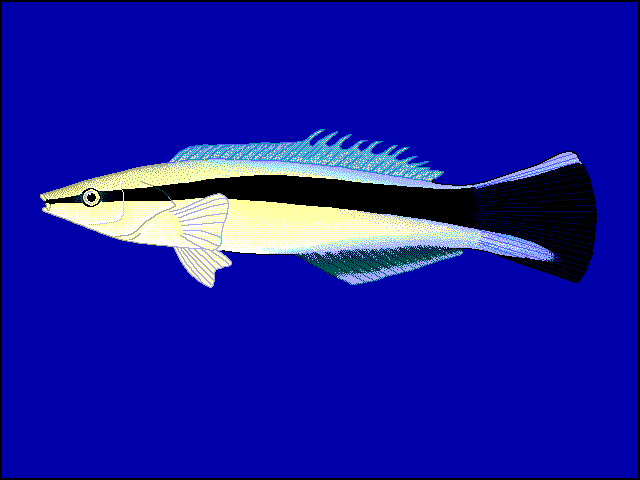
Bluestreak wrasse, Labroides dimidiatus

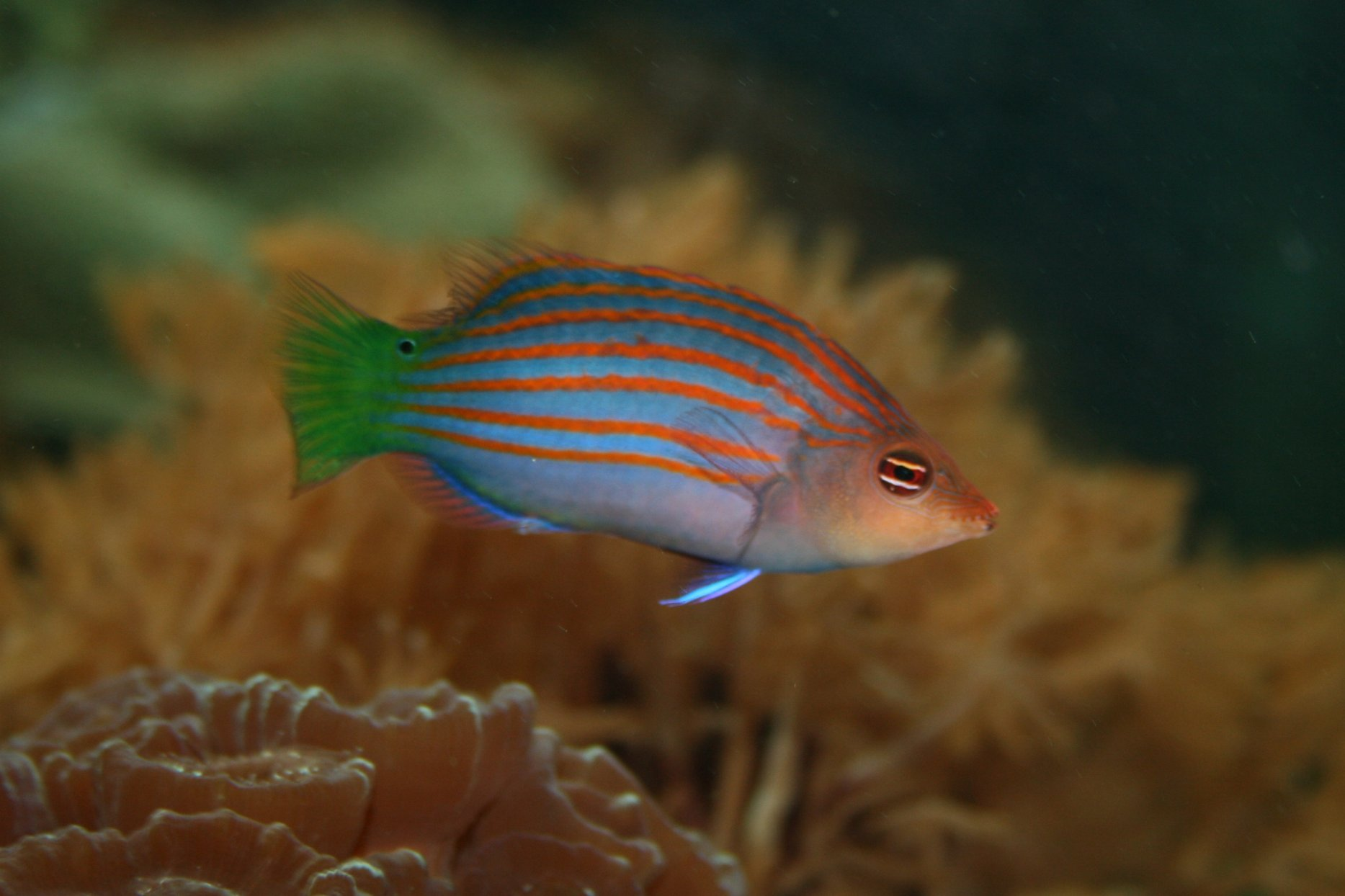
Six-line wrasse , Pseudocheilinus hexataenia

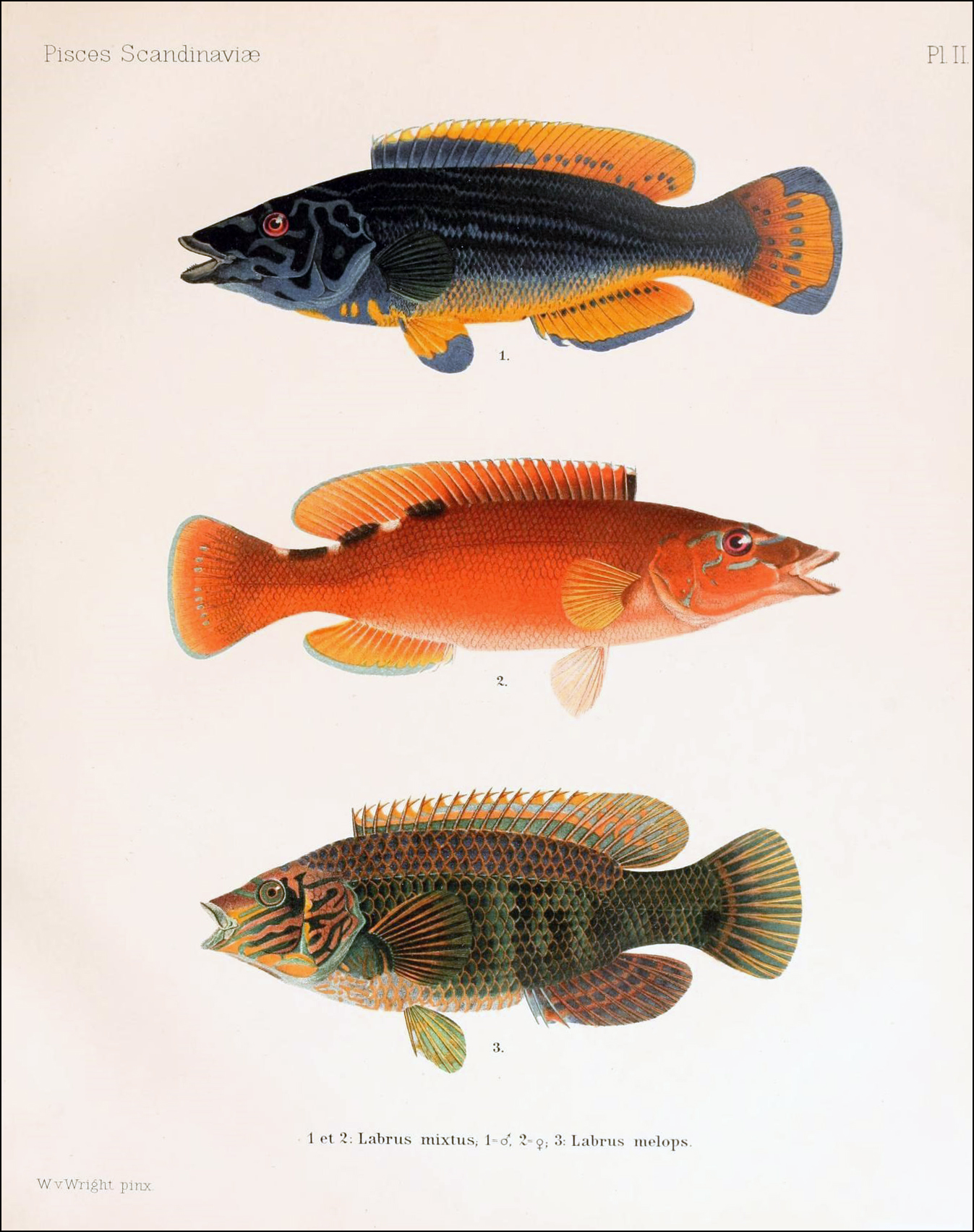
Cuckoo wrasse and corkwing wrasse by Wilhelm von Wright

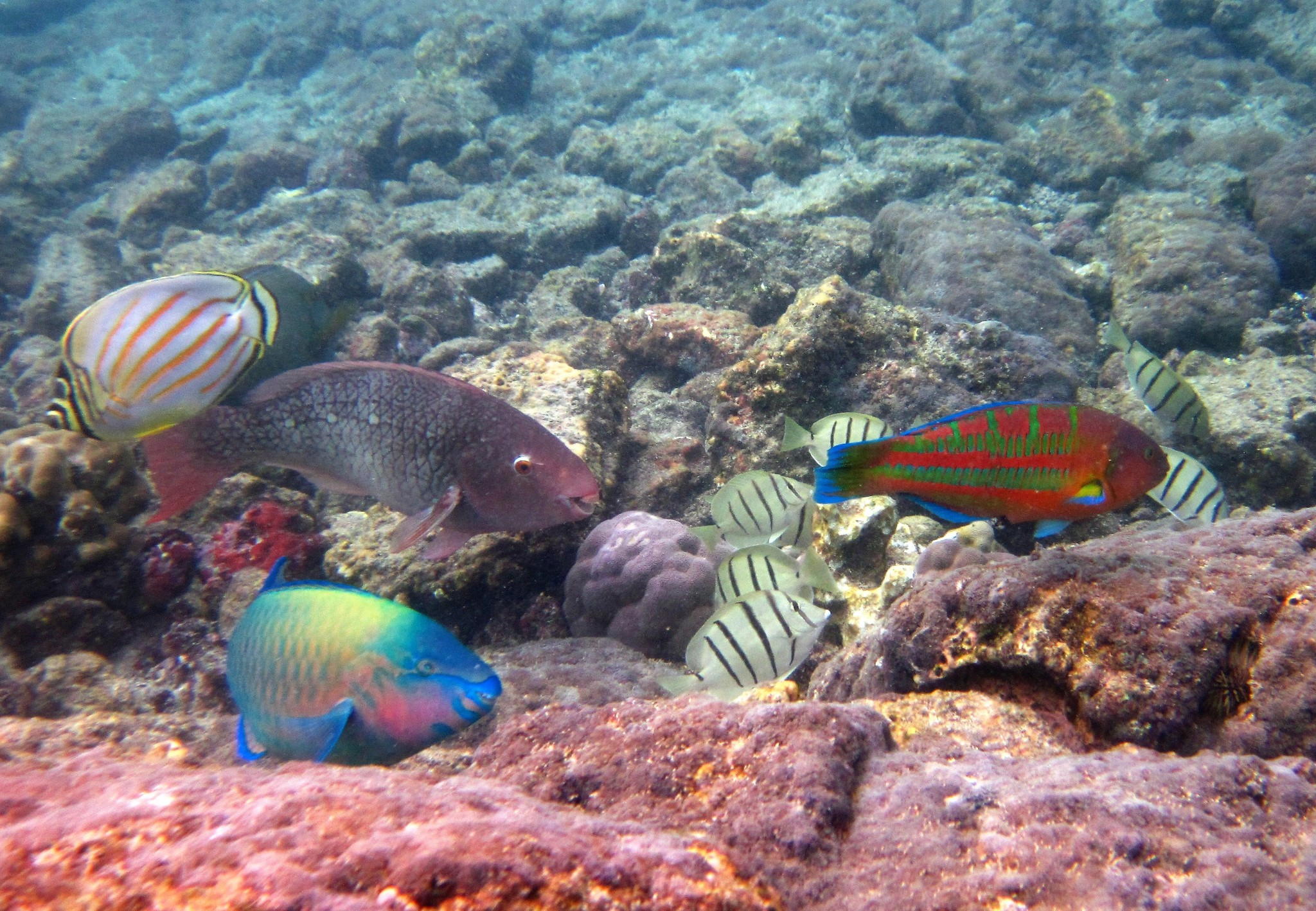
Several wrasse species, including Christmas wrasse, ember parrotfish, and common parrotfish
