= Microcotyle odacis =

Scientific classification
- Kingdom: Animalia
- Phylum: Platyhelminthes
- Class: Monogenea
- Order: Mazocraeidea
- Family: Microcotylidae
- Genus: Microcotyle
- Species: M. odacis

Binomial name
- Microcotyle odacis Sandars, 1945

Synonyms
- Microcotyle (Microcotyle) odacis (Sandars, 1945) Unnithan1971

Species of worm

Microcotyle odacis is a species of monogenean, parasitic on the gills of a marine fish. It belongs to the family Microcotylidae.

== Systematics ==
Microcotyle odacis was first described and illustrated based on 15 specimens from the gills of Odax semifasciatus (Odacidae), (currently Haletta semifasciata). It was placed in the nominal subgenus Microcotyle as Microcotyle (Microcotyle) odacis. However, this combination was later suppressed. M. odacis was redescribed and illustrated from the type-host and locality and the original figures and description of the adult morphology were completed. Some minor differences in measurements and vagina were noted in the redescription.

== Morphology ==
Microcotyle odacis has the general morphology of all species of Microcotyle, with an elongated symmetrical body, comprising an anterior part which contains most organs and a posterior part called the haptor. The haptor is symmetrical, distinctly separated from the rest of the body and bears clamps, arranged as two rows, one on each side (28 on the right and 30 on the left). The clamps of the haptor attach the animal to the gill of the fish. There are also two muscular septated buccal suckers at the anterior extremity. The digestive organs include an anterior, terminal mouth, a subcircular pharynx, an oesophagus bifurcating immediately posterior to the genital atrium and a posterior intestine with two lateral branches provided with numerous secondary branches; both branches enter the haptor. Each adult contains male and female reproductive organs. The reproductive organs include an anterior genital atrium, armed with numerous spines, a medio-dorsal vagina, a single incompletely S-shaped ovary consisting of a convoluted tube and 14 testes which are posterior to the ovary. The eggs are oval, with appendages at both poles.

== Hosts and localities ==
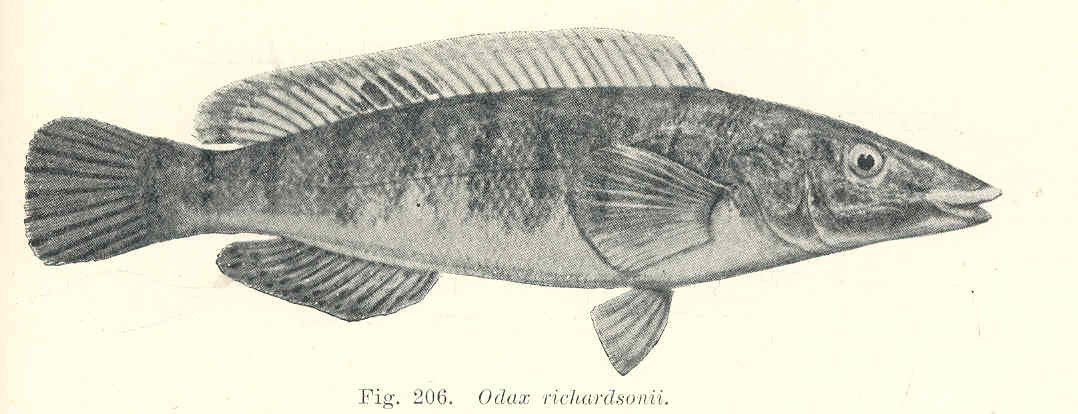
The type-host of Microcotyle odacis is the blue weed-whiting, Haletta semifasciata (Odacidae)

The type-host is the blue weed-whiting, Haletta semifasciata (Odacidae). The type-locality is off Australia. Microcotyle odacis was reported again from the-host and locality.
