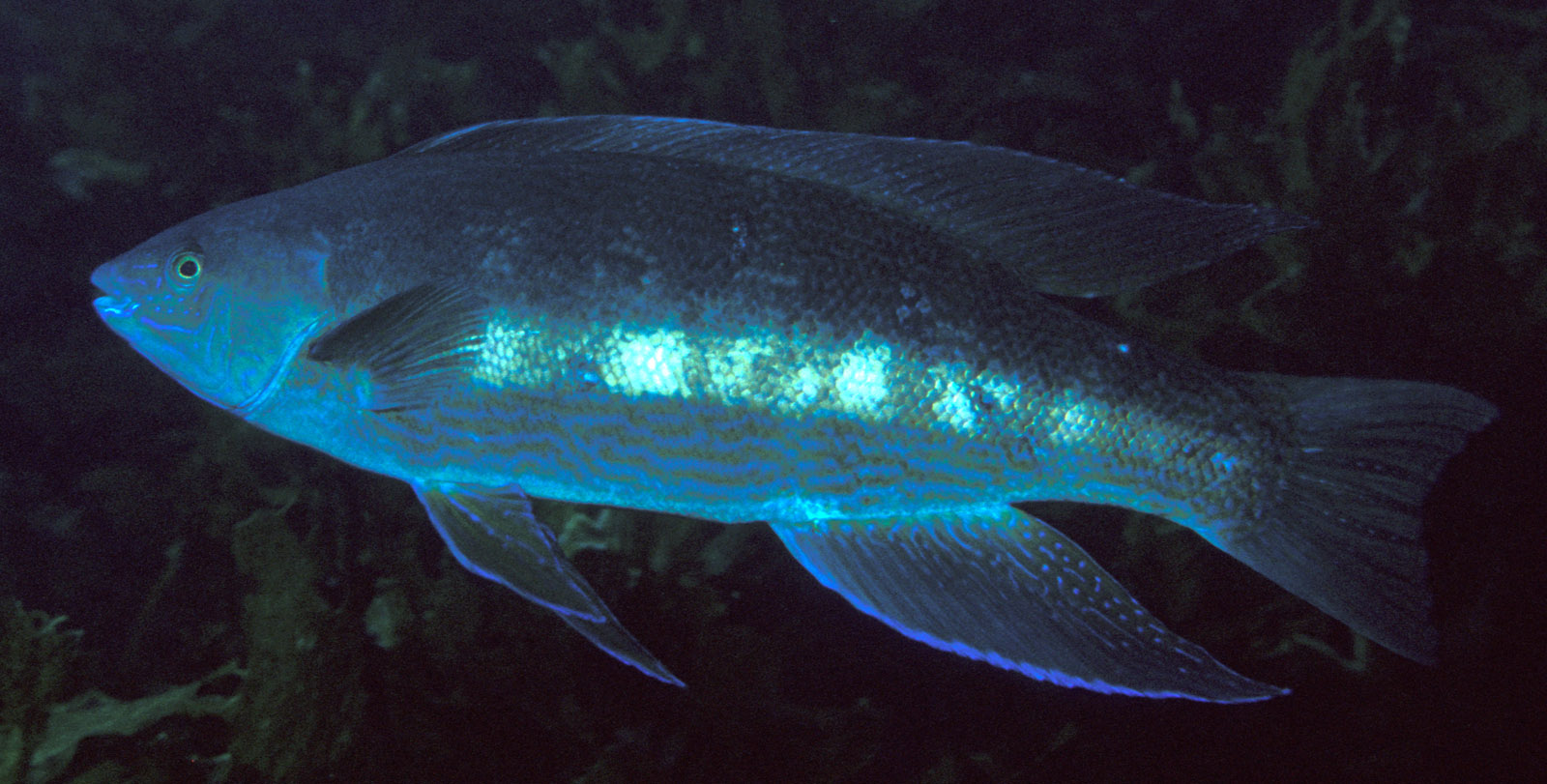

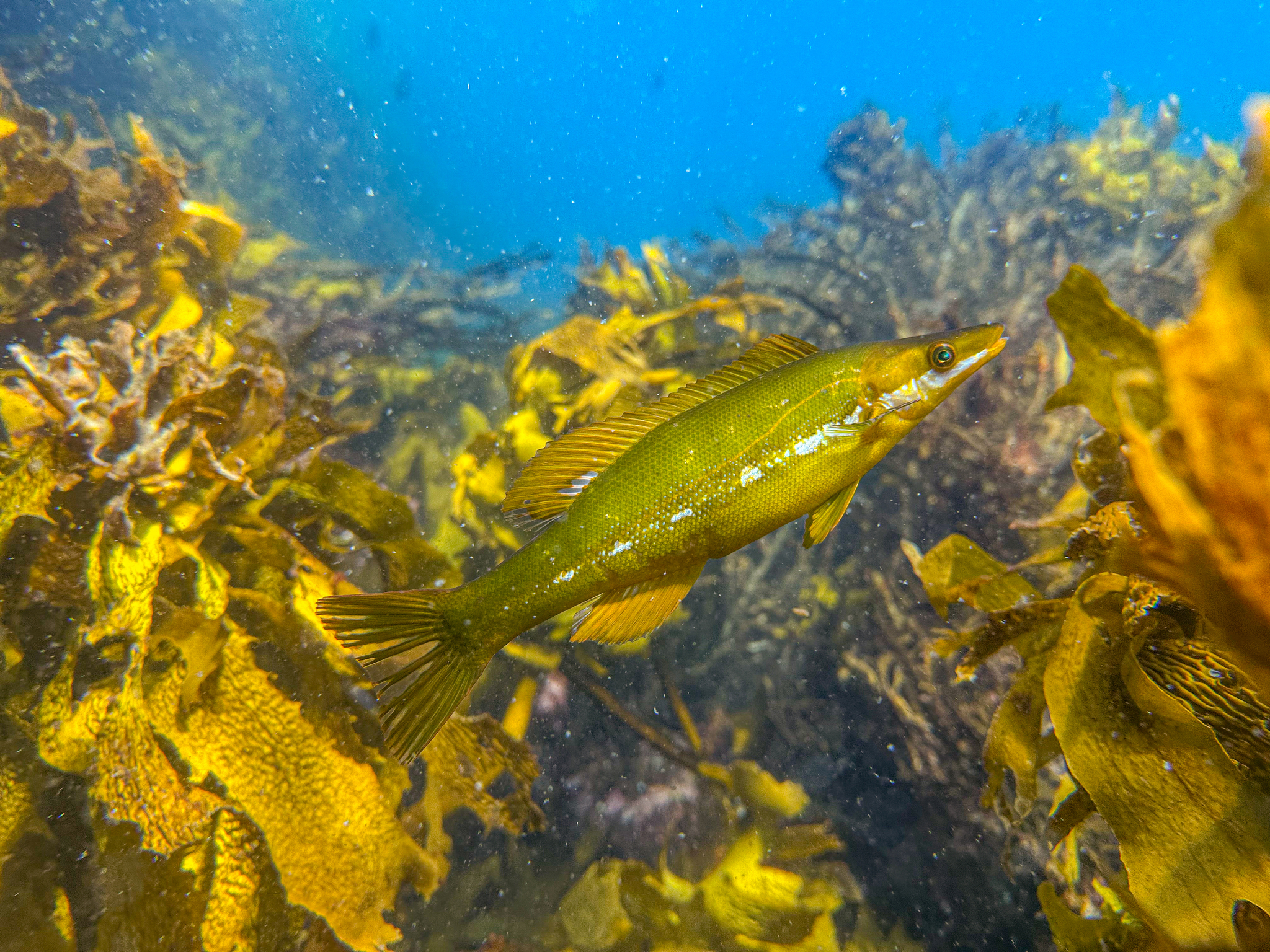

Conservation status
- Least Concern (IUCN 3.1)

Scientific classification
- Kingdom: Animalia
- Phylum: Chordata
- Class: Actinopterygii
- Order: Labriformes
- Family: Labridae
- Genus: Odax
- Species: O. pullus

Binomial name
- Odax pullus (J. R. Forster, 1801)

Synonyms
- List: Scarus pullus J. R. Forster, 1801; Callyodon coregonoides Parkinson, 1843 (ambiguous); Odax vittatus J. Richardson & Solander, 1843; Coregonoides vittatus Solander, 1843 (ambiguous)

= Greenbone =

Species of ray-finned fish

Odax pullus, known by the names greenbone, butterfish or its Māori language name mararī, or rarī, is a species of ray-finned fish, a weed whiting from the family Odacidae, which is found around New Zealand. It is of minor importance to local commercial fisheries.

== Names ==
Odax pullus is commonly known in English as the greenbone, the butterfish or the greenbone butterfish. In the indigenous Māori language, the species has several names: kōeaea, marare, mararī, matohe and tarao.

== Description ==
Greenbone fish are protogynous hermaphrodites, beginning life as female and a proportion becoming male later in life. Young fish begin life with a golden-yellow colour, developing into a dark green-blue as the fish become juveniles. Adult fish are typically brown-yellow in colour.

This species reaches a length of 40 centimetres (16 in) SL and has been recorded as reaching 1.5 kilograms (3.3 lb). Once the fish reach a length of 40 centimetres (16 in), approximately half of the fish develop into males, who have a bright-blue colour.

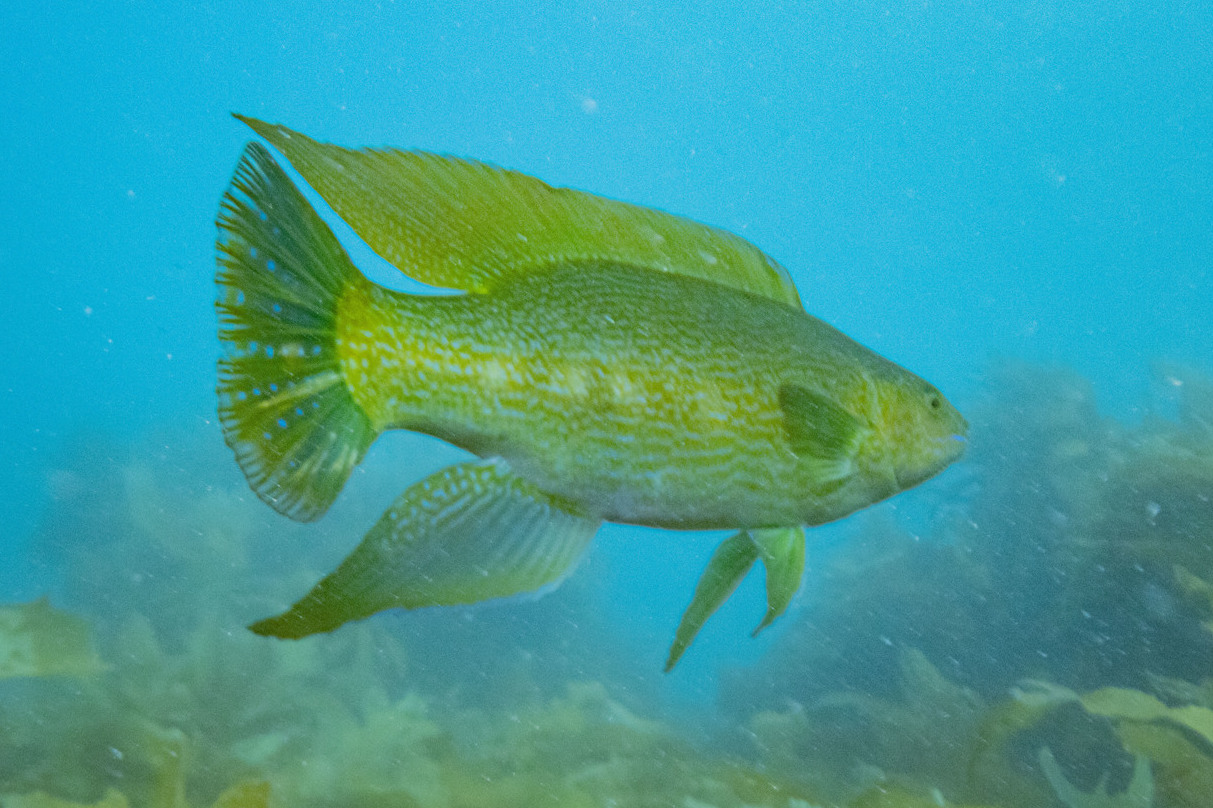
A younger golden-yellow Odax pullus in a kelp forest

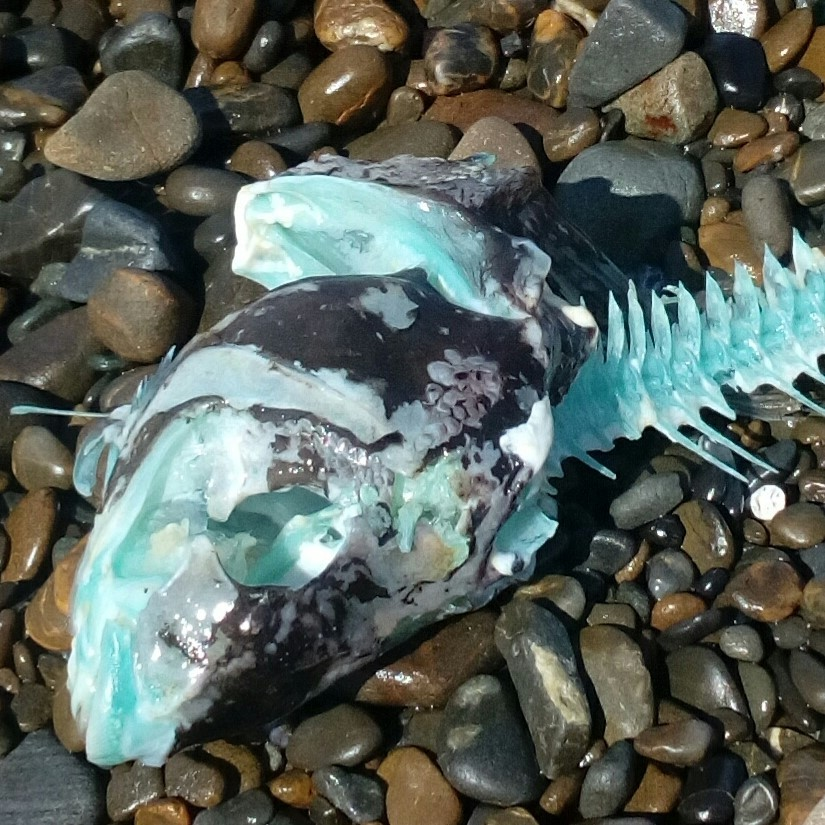
As their name implies, the bones of the species are blue-green in colour

== Distribution and habitat ==
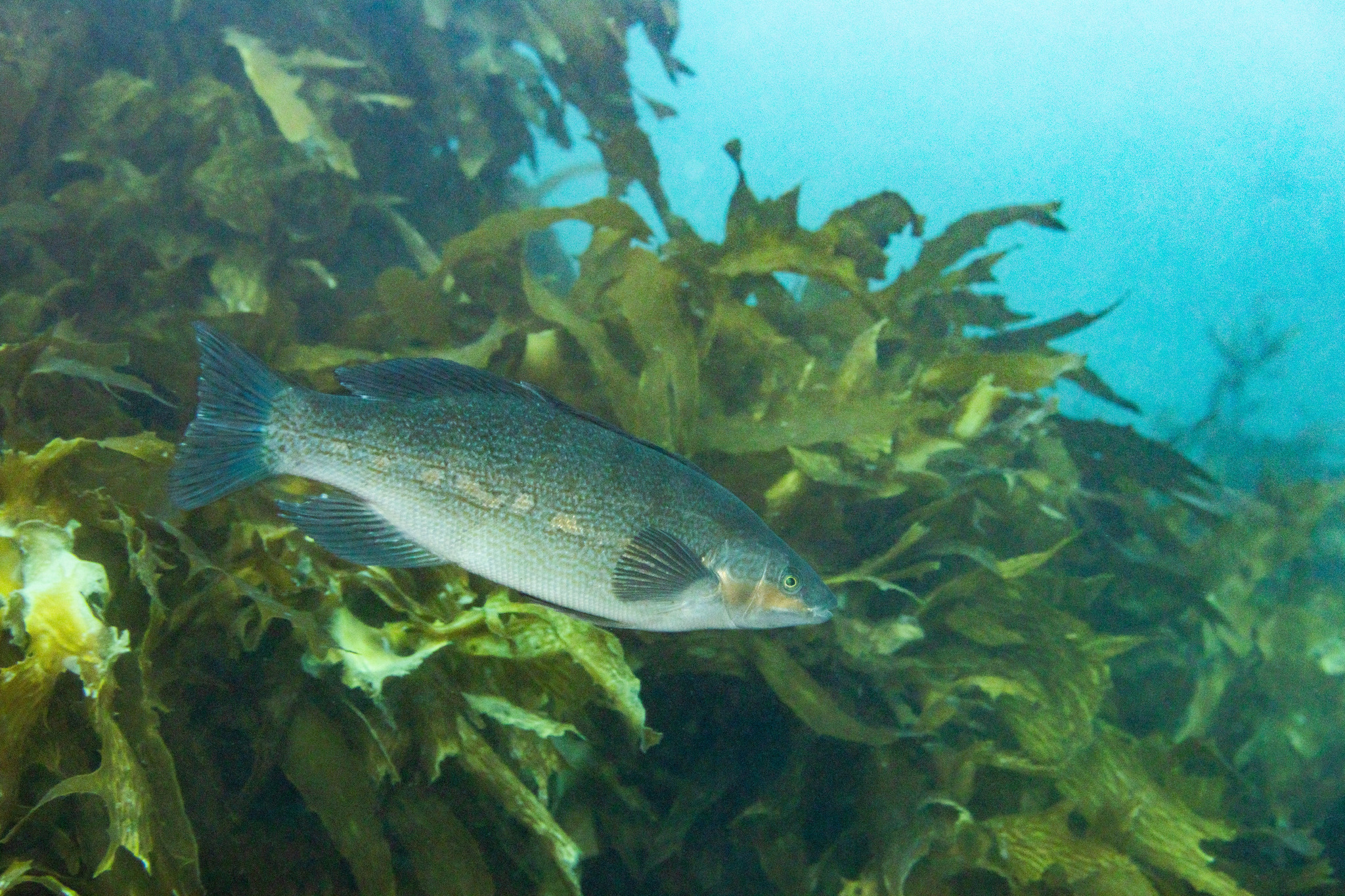
At Wellington (NZ)

Odax pullus is common in New Zealand coastal waters, particularly around the South Island. Its range includes the Chatham Islands, Antipodes Islands and Bounty Islands but it is not present around the Three Kings Islands, where it is replaced by the endemic bluefinned butterfish O. cyanoallix.

It inhabits shallow, rocky areas with brown algae growth, mainly Carpophyllum.

== Diet ==
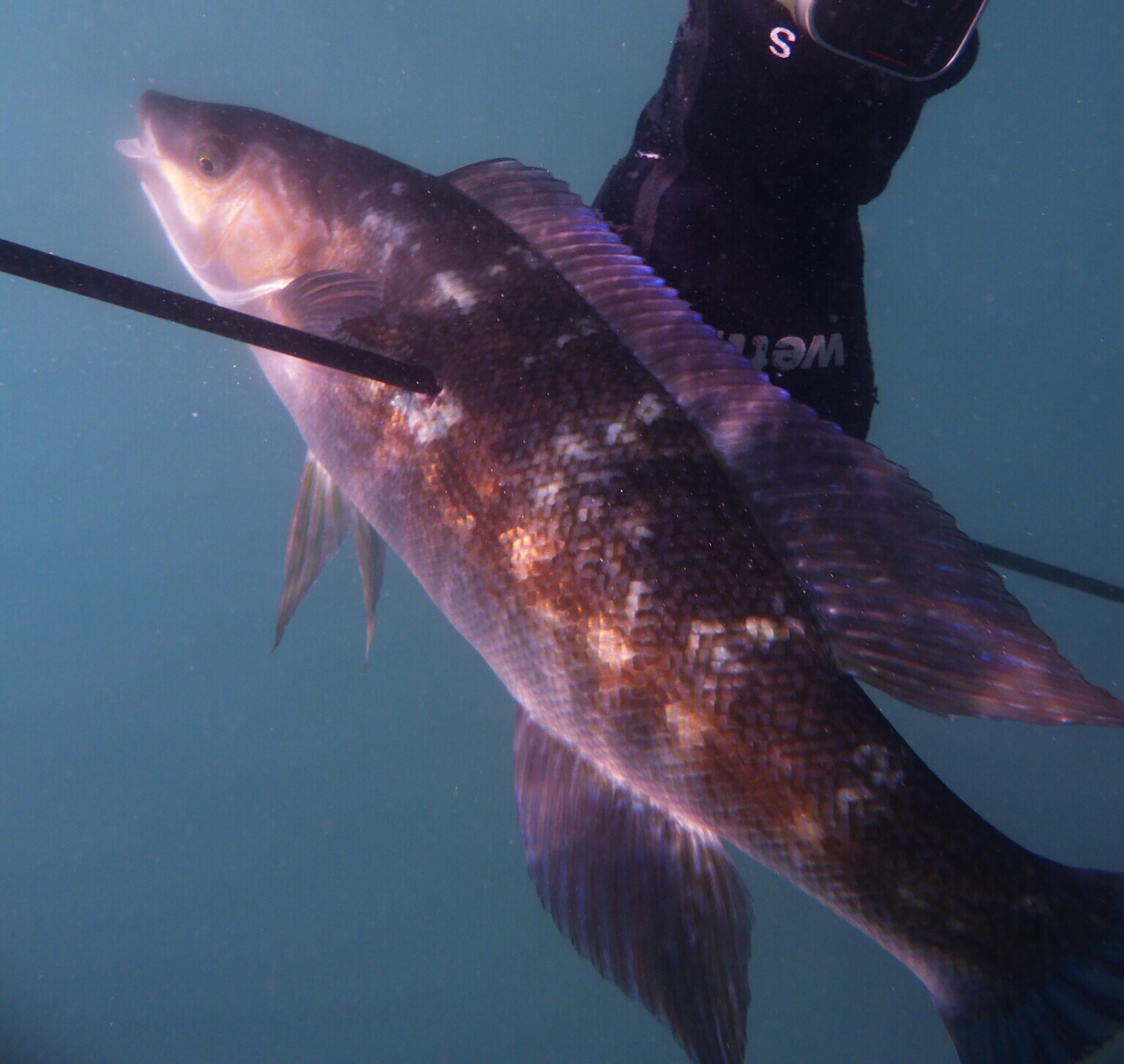
Spearfishing greenbone

Greenbones are primarily herbivorous, feeding mostly on brown seaweeds.

== In a human context ==
Rarī is a traditional Māori food-source, and developed a folk reputation for being troublemakers. The name rarī over time became used to describe people who were troublemakers as well. The fish was more commonly eaten in southern New Zealand, and typically caught using large pole nets which used kelp as a camouflage.

Early European settlers similarly had a poor reputation for the fish, until a public health campaign in the 1920s by the Department of Health, who encouraged people to eat the fish due to its high levels of iodine.
