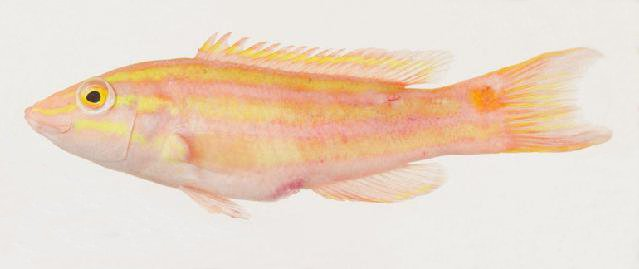

Conservation status
- Least Concern (IUCN 3.1)

Scientific classification
- Kingdom: Animalia
- Phylum: Chordata
- Class: Actinopterygii
- Order: Labriformes
- Family: Labridae
- Genus: Polylepion
- Species: P. russelli

Binomial name
- Polylepion russelli (Gomon & Randall, 1975)
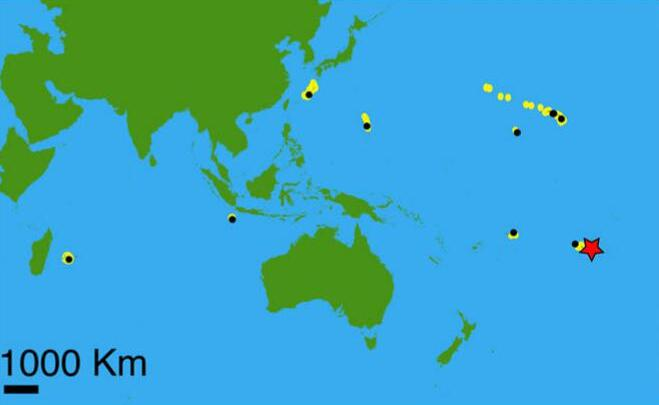

Synonyms
- Bodianus russelli Gomon & Randall, 1975

= Polylepion russelli =

Species of fish

Polylepion russelli is a species of marine ray-finned fish from the family Labridae, the wrasses. This benthopelagic species occurs near reefs in deep water in the North Pacific Ocean. It is found at depths of 100 to 353 metres (328 to 1,158 ft). Its range extends from Okinawa east to the Society Islands and Hawaii. This species was first formally described as Bodianus russelli by Martin F. Gomon and John E. Randall in 1975 with the type locality given as Moku Manu near Oahu in Hawaii. When Gomon described the new genus Polylepion in 1977 he designated P. russelli as its type species.

== Etymology ==
The specific name of this fish honours Peter E. Russell of Kaneoke on Oahu who collected and gave the holotype to the Bishop Museum in Honolulu.
