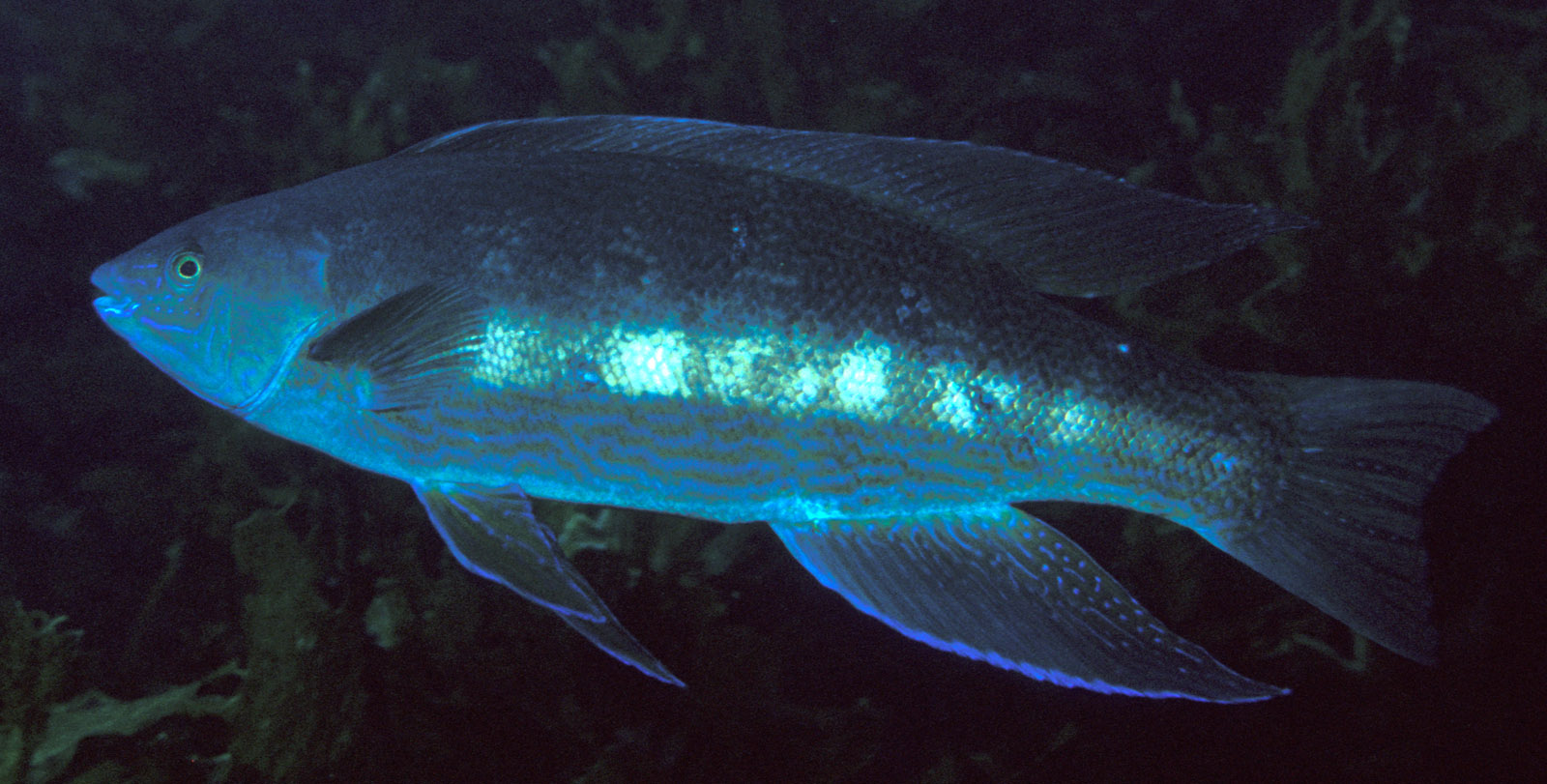
- Odax pullus

Scientific classification
- Kingdom: Animalia
- Phylum: Chordata
- Class: Actinopterygii
- Division: Teleostei
- Order: Labriformes
- Family: Labridae
- Subfamily: Hypsigenyinae
- Genus: Odax; Valenciennes, 1840

Type species
- Scarus pullus J. R. Forster, 1801

Synonyms
- Coregonoides J. Richardson, 1843; Coridodax Günther, 1862

= Odax =

Genus of ray-finned fishes

Odax is a genus of marine ray-finned fish, commonly known as weed whitings from the family Odacidae which are native to the Pacific waters of New Zealand.

== Species ==
There are currently two recognized species in this genus:

- Odax cyanoallix Ayling & Paxton, 1983 (Bluefinned butterfish)
- Odax pullus (J. R. Forster, 1801) (Butterfish)

In addition to these, the Australian herring cale has frequently been placed in this genus.
