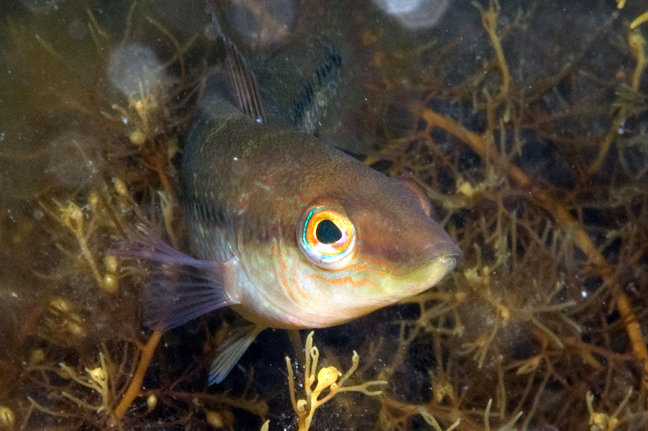

Conservation status
- Least Concern (IUCN 3.1)

Scientific classification
- Kingdom: Animalia
- Phylum: Chordata
- Class: Actinopterygii
- Order: Labriformes
- Family: Labridae
- Subfamily: Hypsigenyinae
- Genus: Neoodax; Castelnau, 1875
- Species: N. balteatus

Binomial name
- Neoodax balteatus (Valenciennes, 1840)

Synonyms
- Odax balteatus Valenciennes, 1840; Odax algensis J. Richardson, 1840; Odax obscurus Castelnau, 1872; Neoodax waterhousii Castelnau, 1875; Odax brunneus W. J. Macleay, 1881

= Little weed whiting =

Species of ray-finned fish

The little weed whiting (Neoodax balteatus) is a species of ray-finned fish, a weed whiting from the family Labridae which is endemic to Australia. It occurs along the Southern Australian coast, including Tasmania, ranging north to Cockburn Sound on the Indian Ocean side, and to north of the city of Sydney on the Pacific Ocean side. It inhabits marine and brackish waters, preferring sheltered areas such as estuaries and also on rocky reefs and in seagrass beds. It occurs at depths of from 1 to 22 metres (3.3 to 72.2 ft) (though usually shallower than 15 metres (49 ft)). This species grows to a length of 14 centimetres (5.5 in) SL. It can also be found in the aquarium trade. This species is the only known member of its genus.

== Gallery ==
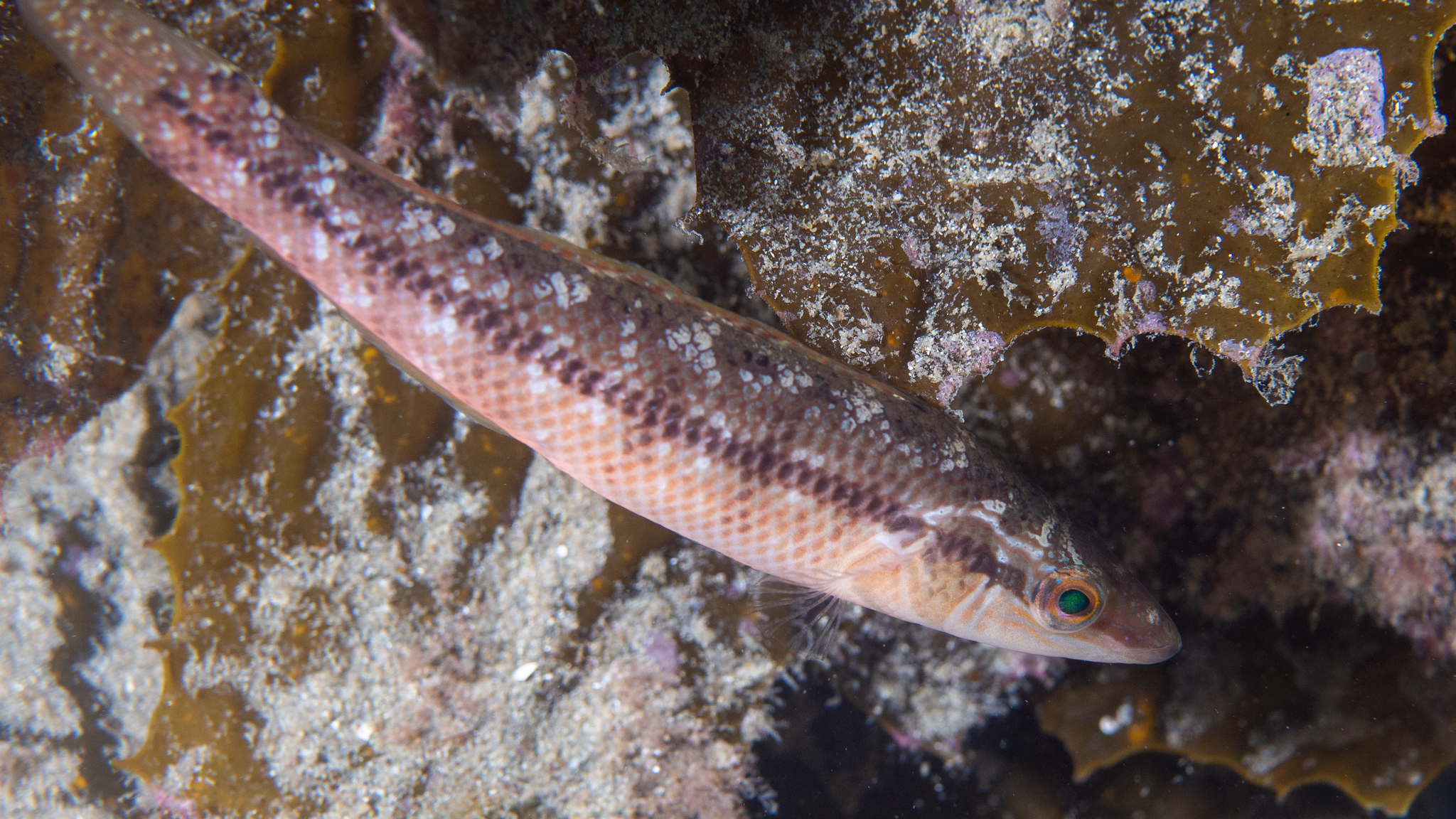

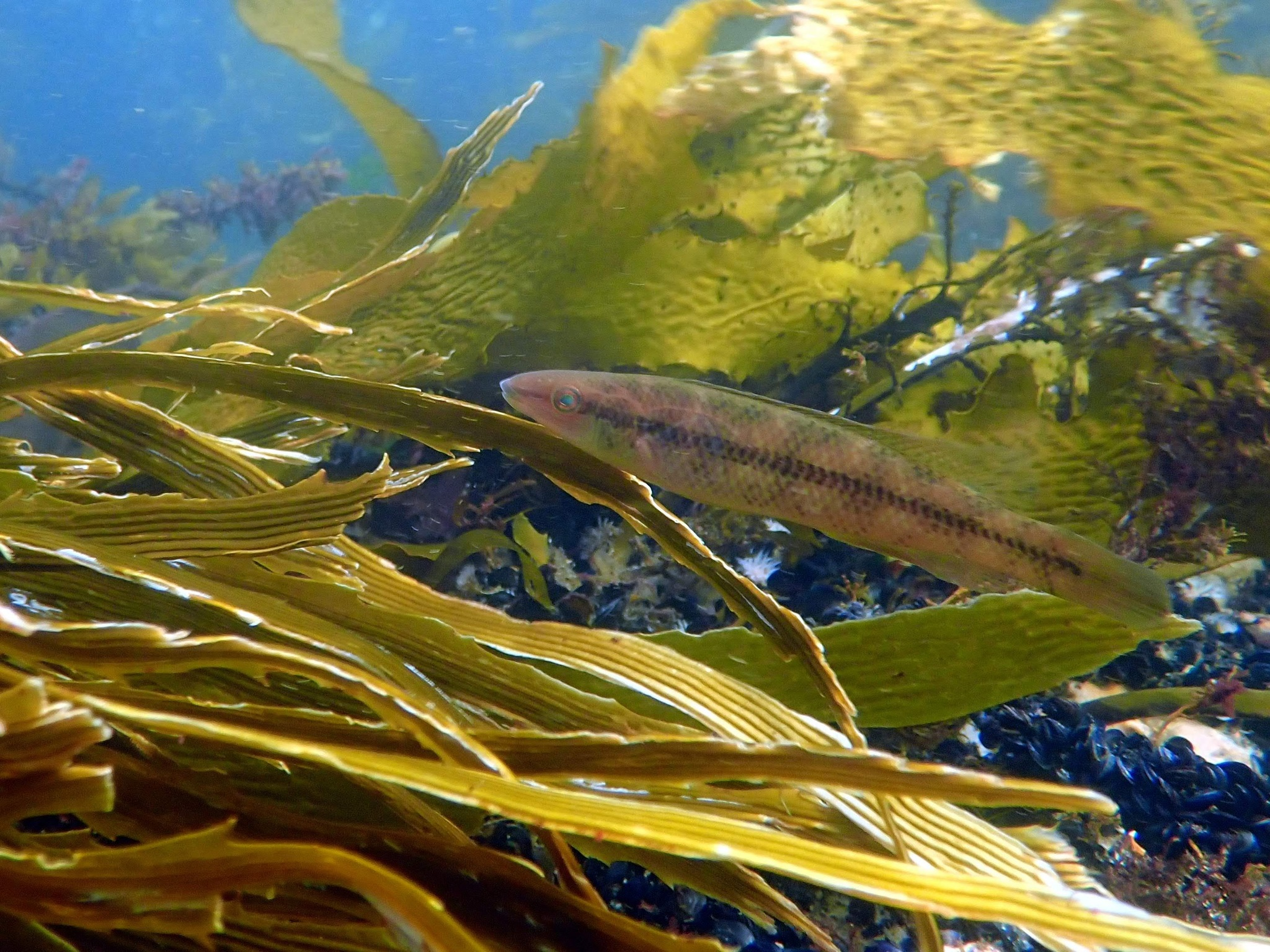

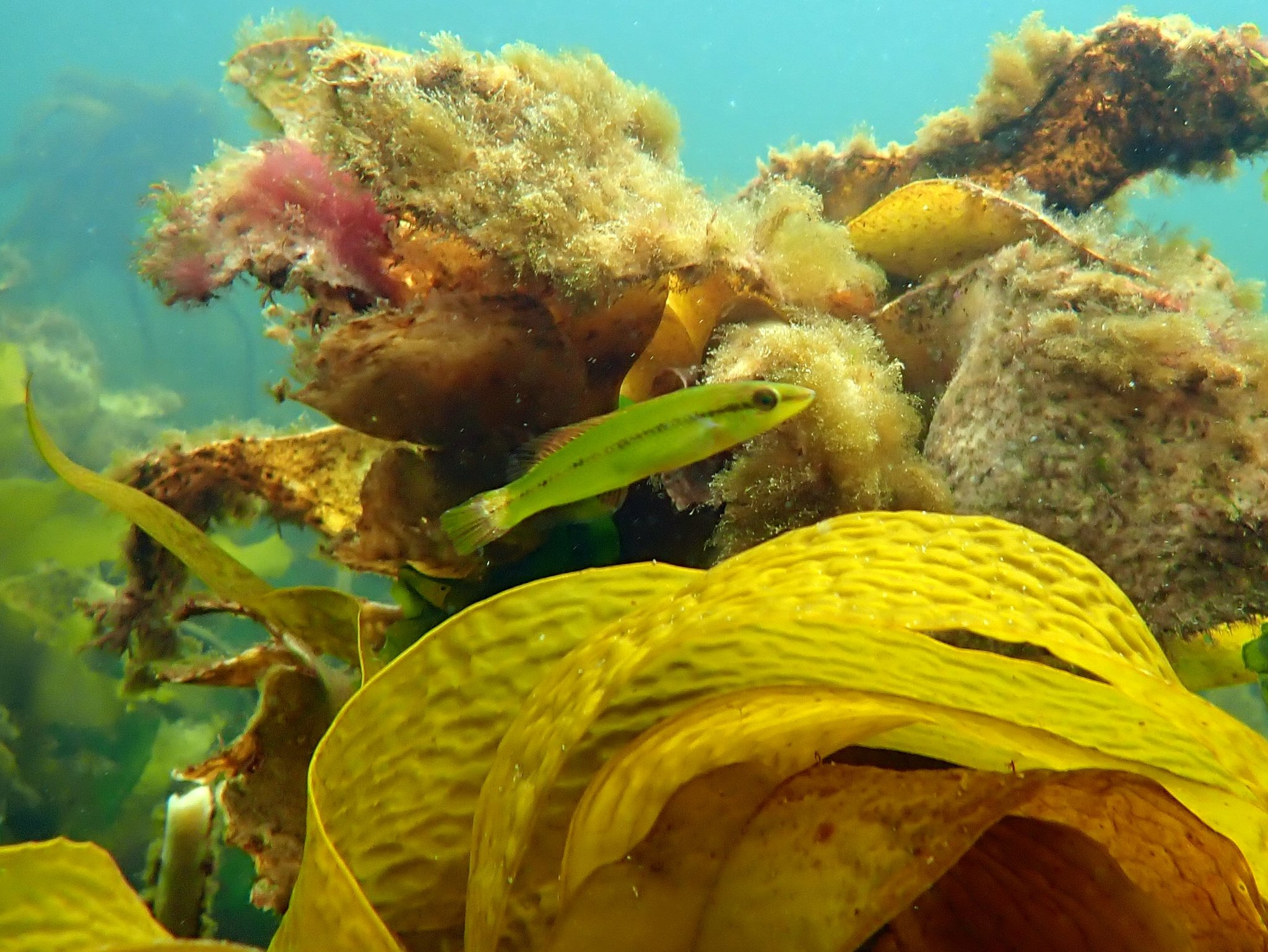

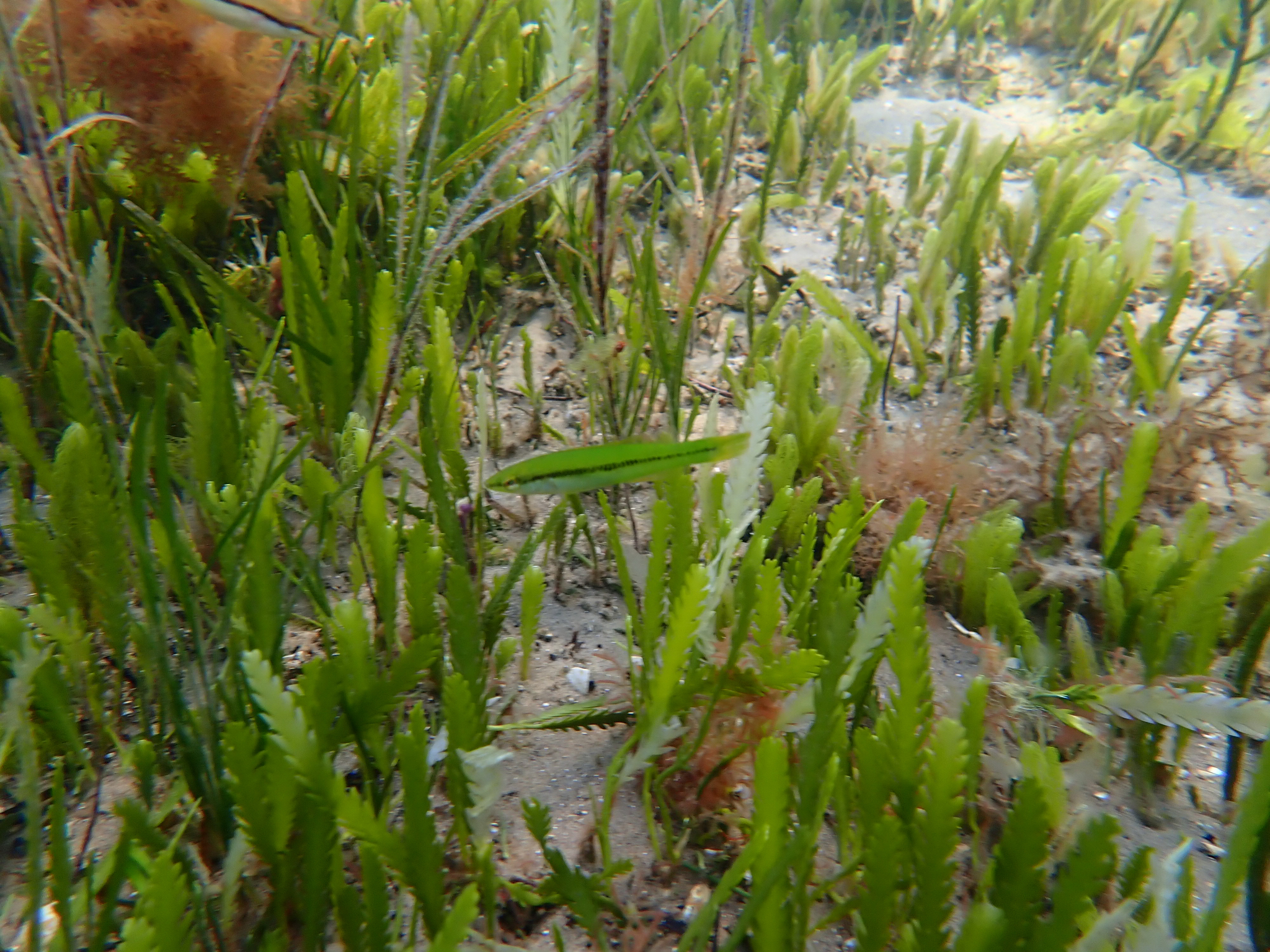

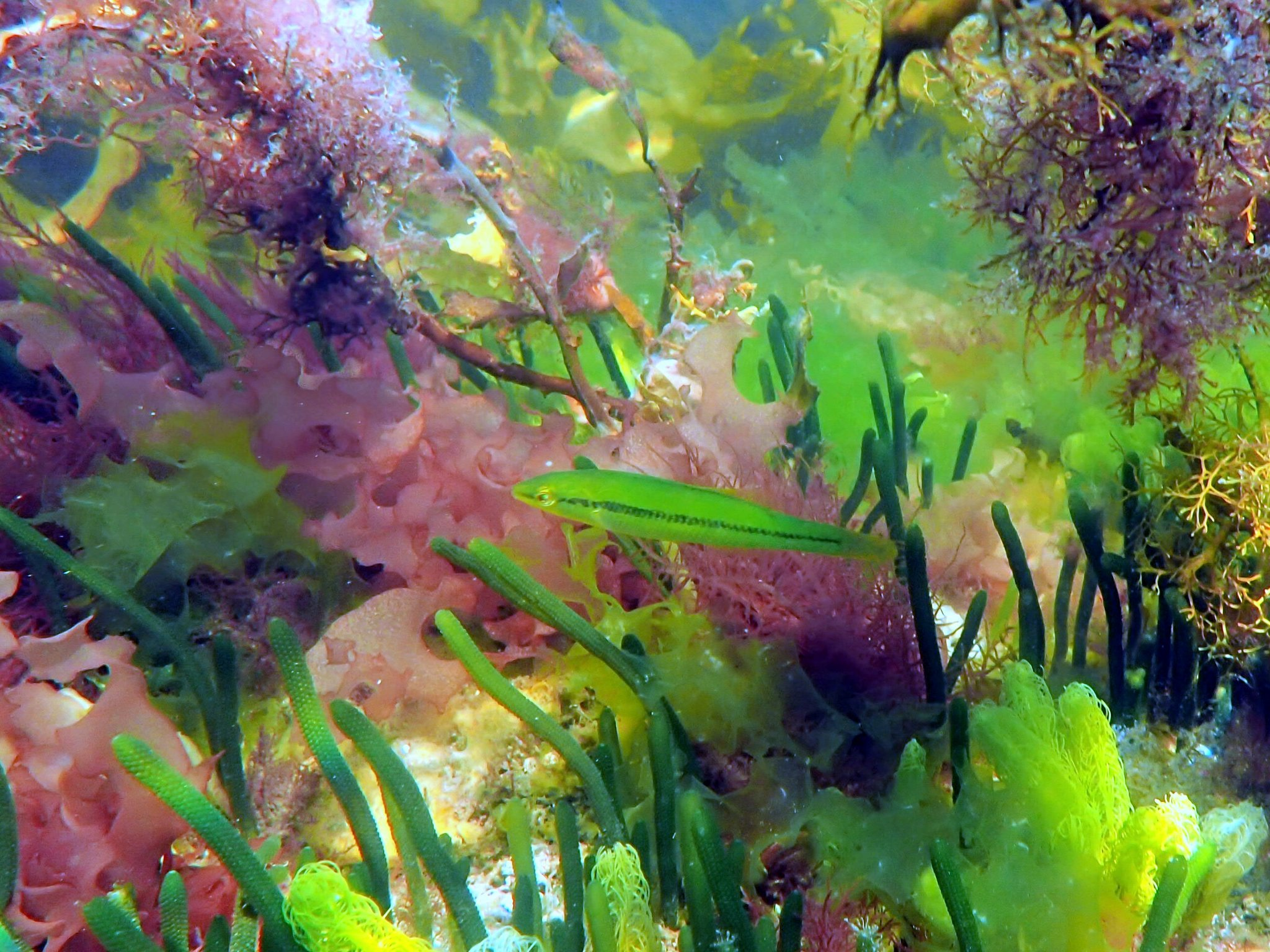

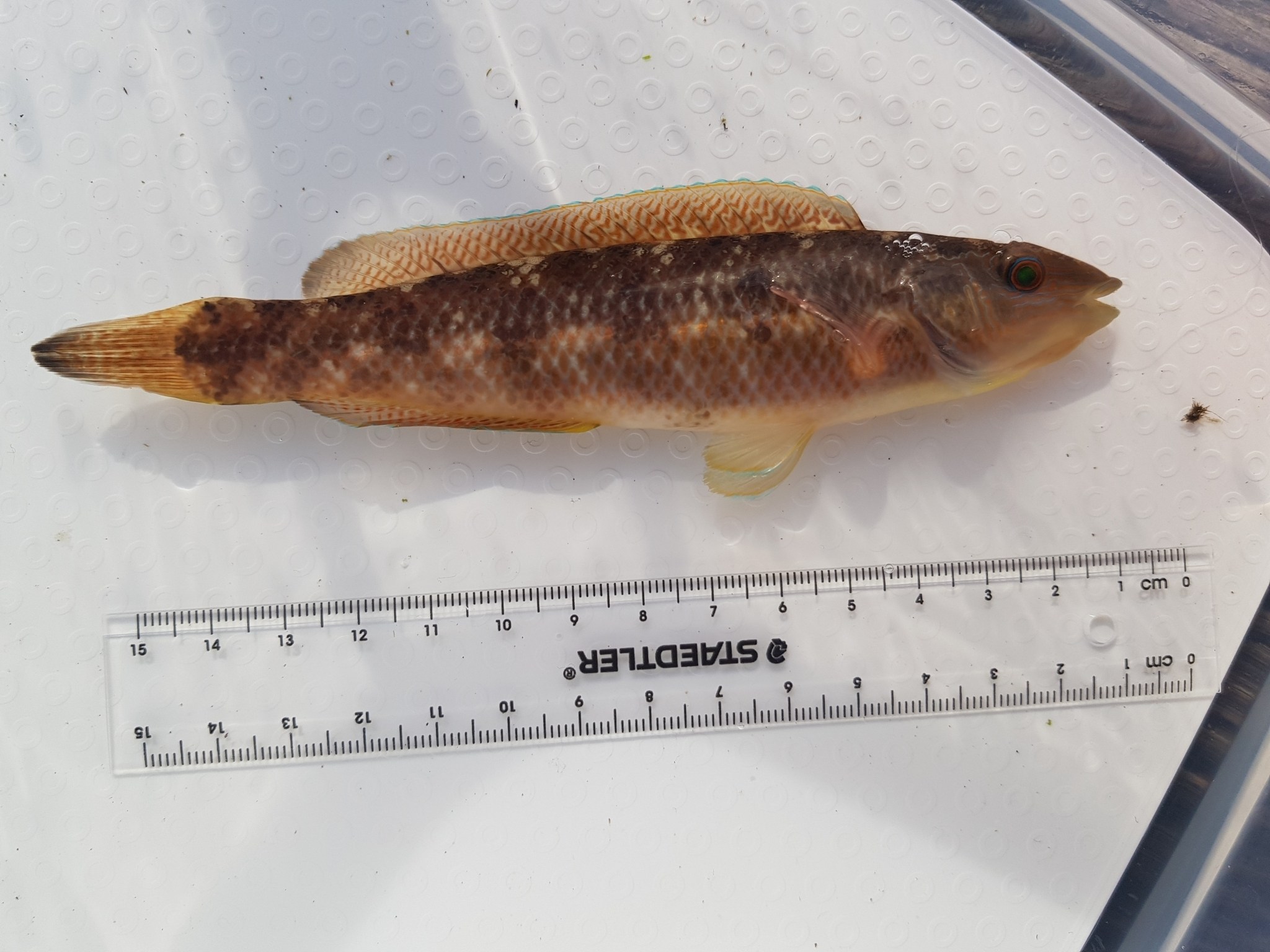
Showing size

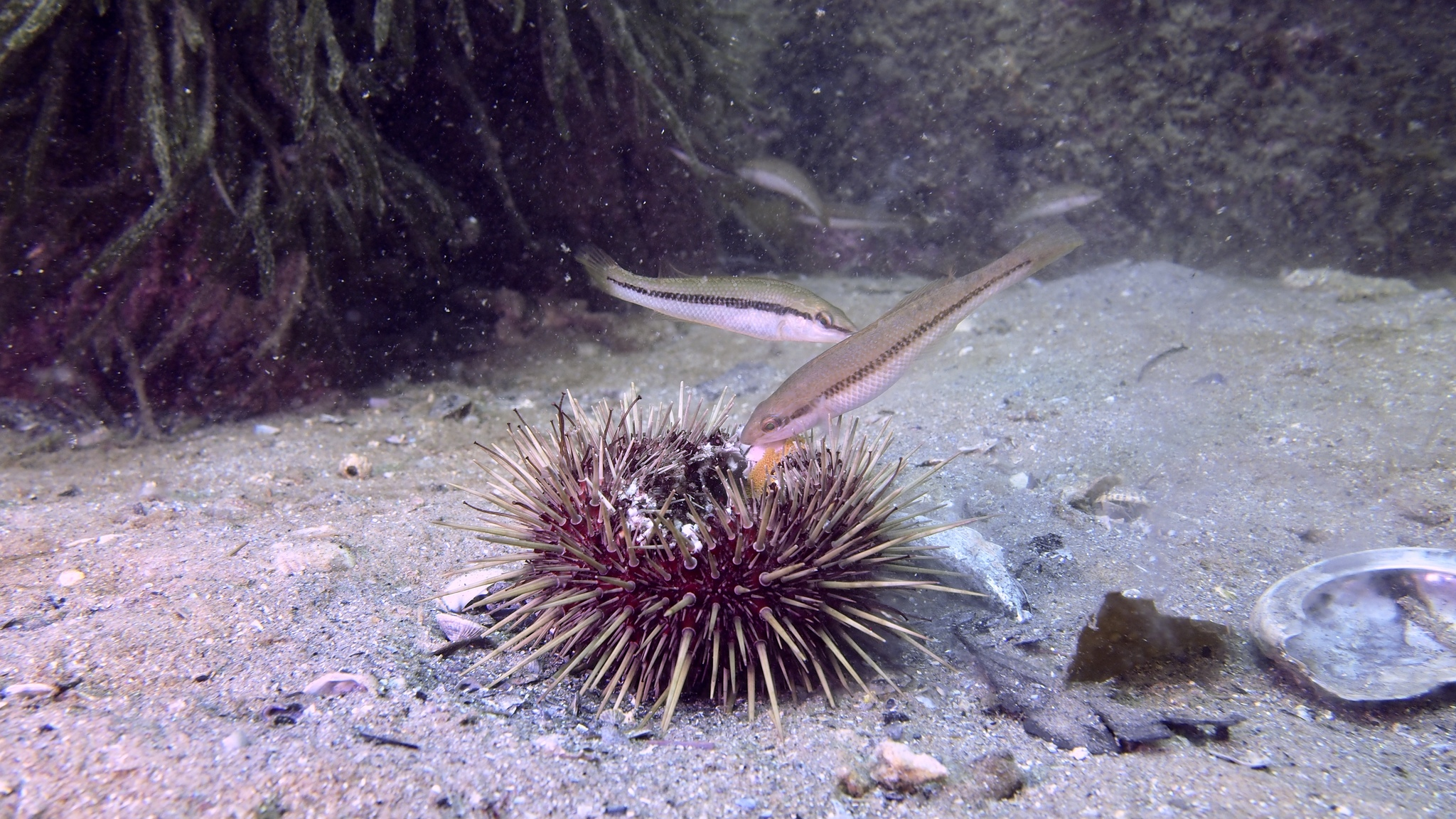
Feeding on a cracked open sea urchin
