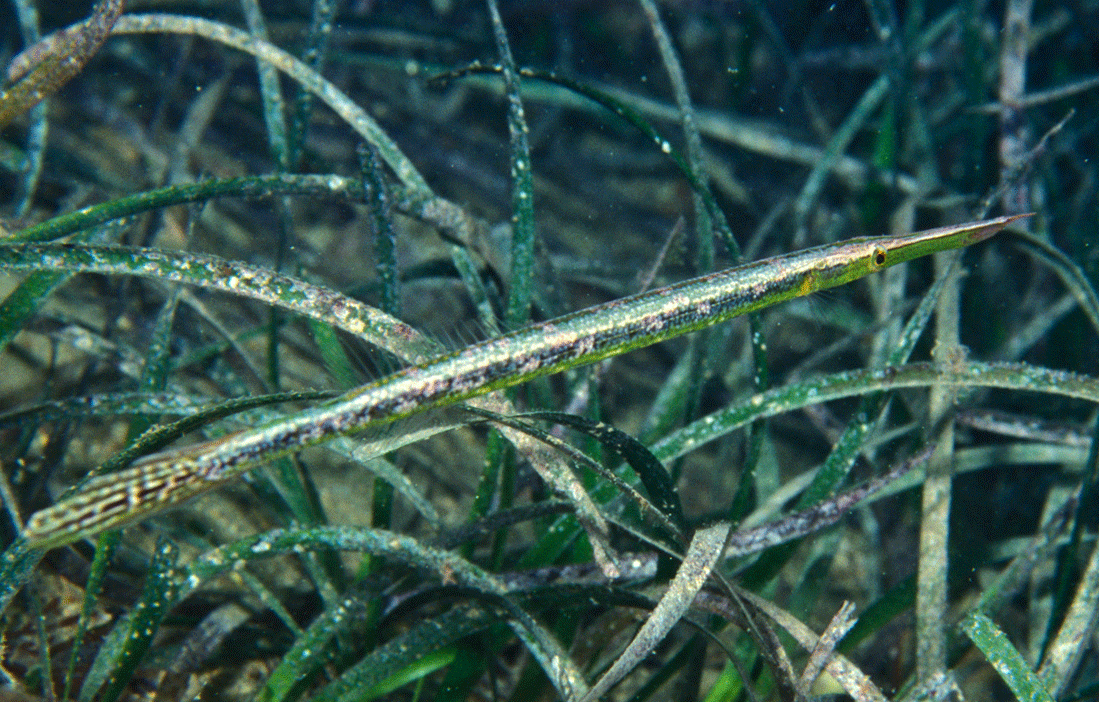

Conservation status
- Least Concern (IUCN 3.1)

Scientific classification
- Kingdom: Animalia
- Phylum: Chordata
- Class: Actinopterygii
- Order: Labriformes
- Family: Labridae
- Subfamily: Hypsigenyinae
- Genus: Siphonognathus; Richardson, 1858
- Species: S. argyrophanes

Binomial name
- Siphonognathus argyrophanes Richardson, 1858

= Tubemouth =

Species of ray-finned fish

The tubemouth (Siphonognathus argyrophanes) is a species of ray-finned fish, a weed whiting from the family Labridae. It is endemic to the southern coatsts of Australia where it is camouflaged to live among beds of seagrass.

== Description ==
The tubemouth has a highly elongated head and body and has a fleshy barbel which protrudes from the end of the upper lip. It has many teeth fused into a beak-like structure. The long-based dorsal fin is low and the shorter anal fin sits below the posterior third of the dorsal fin. It has a long and pointed caudal fin but lacks pelvic fins. It is green on the back, whitish to red-brown ventrally and has a dark stripe along the flanks. It can attain a standard length of 40 centimetres (16 in).

== Distribution ==
The tubemouth is endemic to southern Australia where it can be found from Geraldton in Western Australia southwards and then along the southern coast of Australia to the Gippsland Lakes in Victoria and Tasmania.

== Habitat and biology ==
The tubemouth occurs in sheltered areas where there is a dense growth of Posidonia sea grass, no deeper than 40 metres (130 ft). There is no known difference between the sexes and the biology of this species is almost unknown.

== Taxonomy ==
The tubemouth closely resembles the cornetfishes and trumpetfishes of the order Syngnathiformes in body shape and form, this is an example of convergent evolution. It species is apparently so unique in its form that, at first, it was described within the Fistulariidae prior to being classified in its own monotypic family. The extremely slender body and highly elongated snout, are apparent in other members of the genus Siphonognathus, these features, in combination with the lack of pelvic fins, possession of a barbel on the upper lip and extraordinarily high counts of vertebrae, fin rays and lateral-line scales make it very different from its congeners.

Although Fishbase places six species within the genus Siphonognathus, the Catalog of Fishes places four of those species in the separate genus Sheardichthys and places the fifth on the monospecific genus Parodax, leaving Siphonognathus as a monospecific genus containing only S. argyrophanes.
