= Terelabrus zonalis =

Scientific classification
- Domain: Eukaryota
- Kingdom: Animalia
- Phylum: Chordata
- Class: Actinopterygii
- Order: Labriformes
- Family: Labridae
- Genus: Terelabrus
- Species: T. zonalis

Binomial name
- Terelabrus zonalis Y. Fukui, 2018

Species of wrasse

Terelabrus zonalis also known as striped hogfish, is a species of wrasse native to the Philippines. It has an elongated and cylindrical body, slightly compressed, a typical characteristic of the genus Terelabrus. Your native distribution is uncertain, but there are records from the Philippines, its type locality, and the Great Barrier Reef, Australia.
