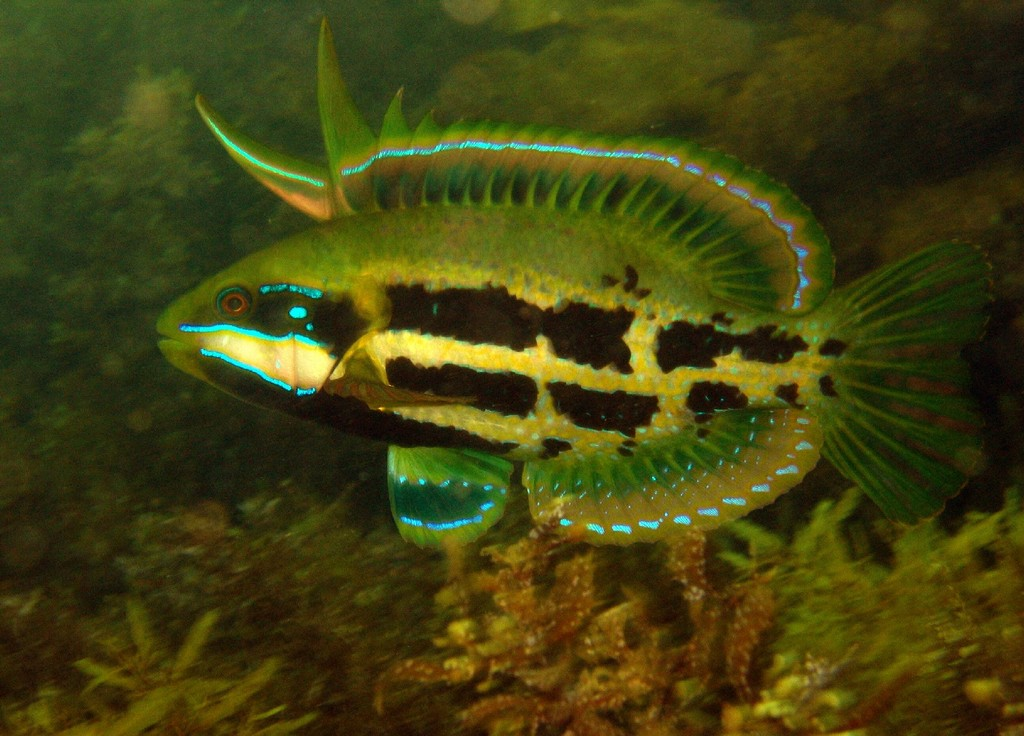
- A male rainbow cale

Conservation status
- Least Concern (IUCN 3.1)

Scientific classification
- Kingdom: Animalia
- Phylum: Chordata
- Class: Actinopterygii
- Order: Labriformes
- Family: Labridae
- Subfamily: Hypsigenyinae
- Genus: Heteroscarus; Castelnau, 1872
- Species: H. acroptilus

Binomial name
- Heteroscarus acroptilus (J. Richardson, 1846)

Synonyms
- Scarus acroptilus J. Richardson, 1846; Odax acroptilus (J. Richardson, 1846); Heteroscarus filamentosus Castelnau, 1872; Heteroscarus modestus Castelnau, 1872; Pseudoscarus modestus Castelnau, 1875; Heteroscarus castelnaui W. J. Macleay, 1878; Heteroscarus elegans Steindachner, 1884; Heteroscarus tenuiceps De Vis, 1885; Heteroscarus macleayi McCoy, 1888

= Rainbow cale =

Species of ray-finned fish

Heteroscarus acroptilus, the rainbow cale, is a species of weed whiting endemic to Australia where it is found in marine waters along the southern coast. It inhabits rocky reefs that have plentiful growth of brown algae and also in beds of seagrass, particularly those of the genus Posidonia. It occurs at depths of from 1 to 15 metres (3.3 to 49.2 ft). This species grows to a length of 24 centimetres (9.4 in) SL. It can also be found in the aquarium trade. This species is the only known member of its genus.
