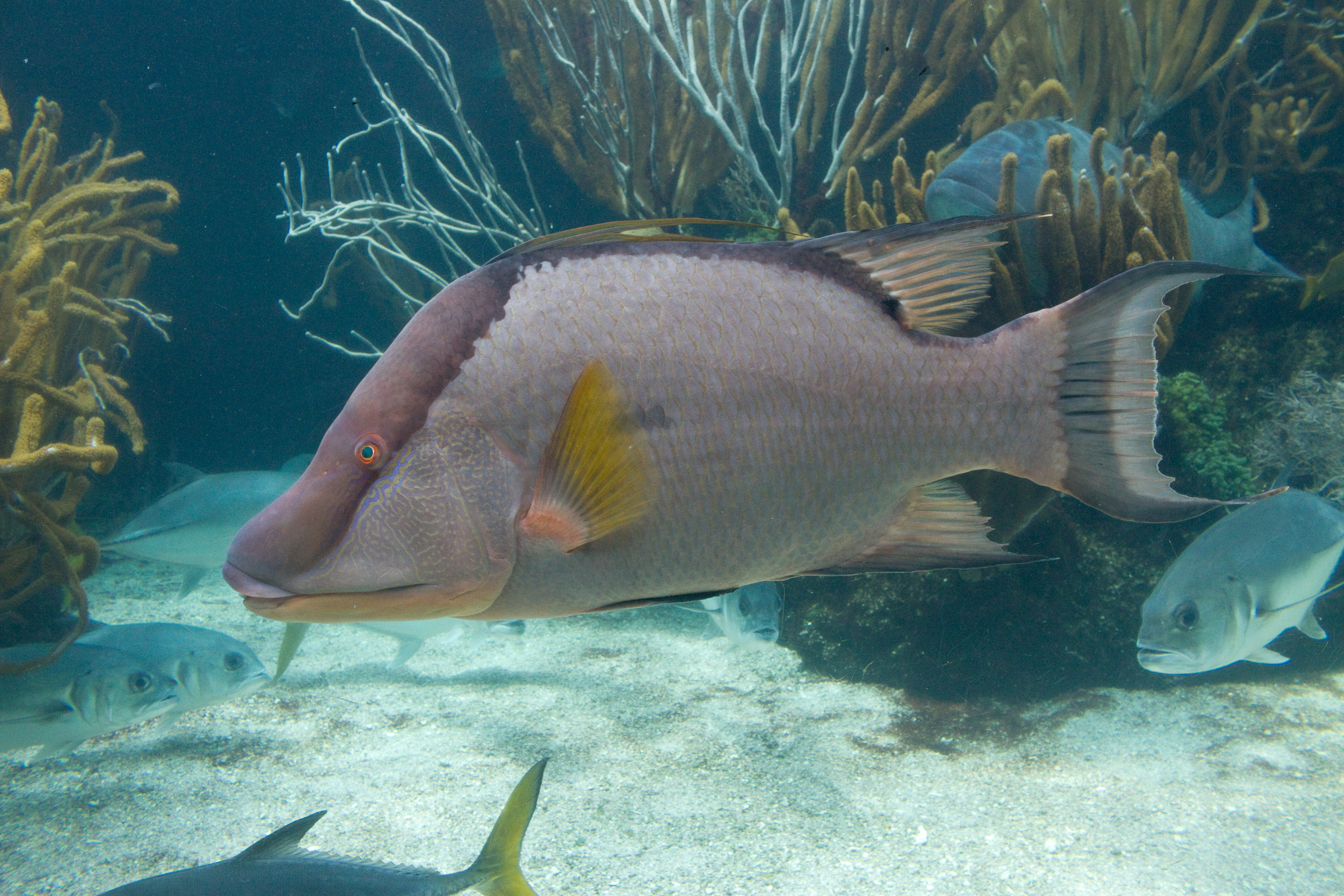
- Hogfish (Lachnolaimus maximus)
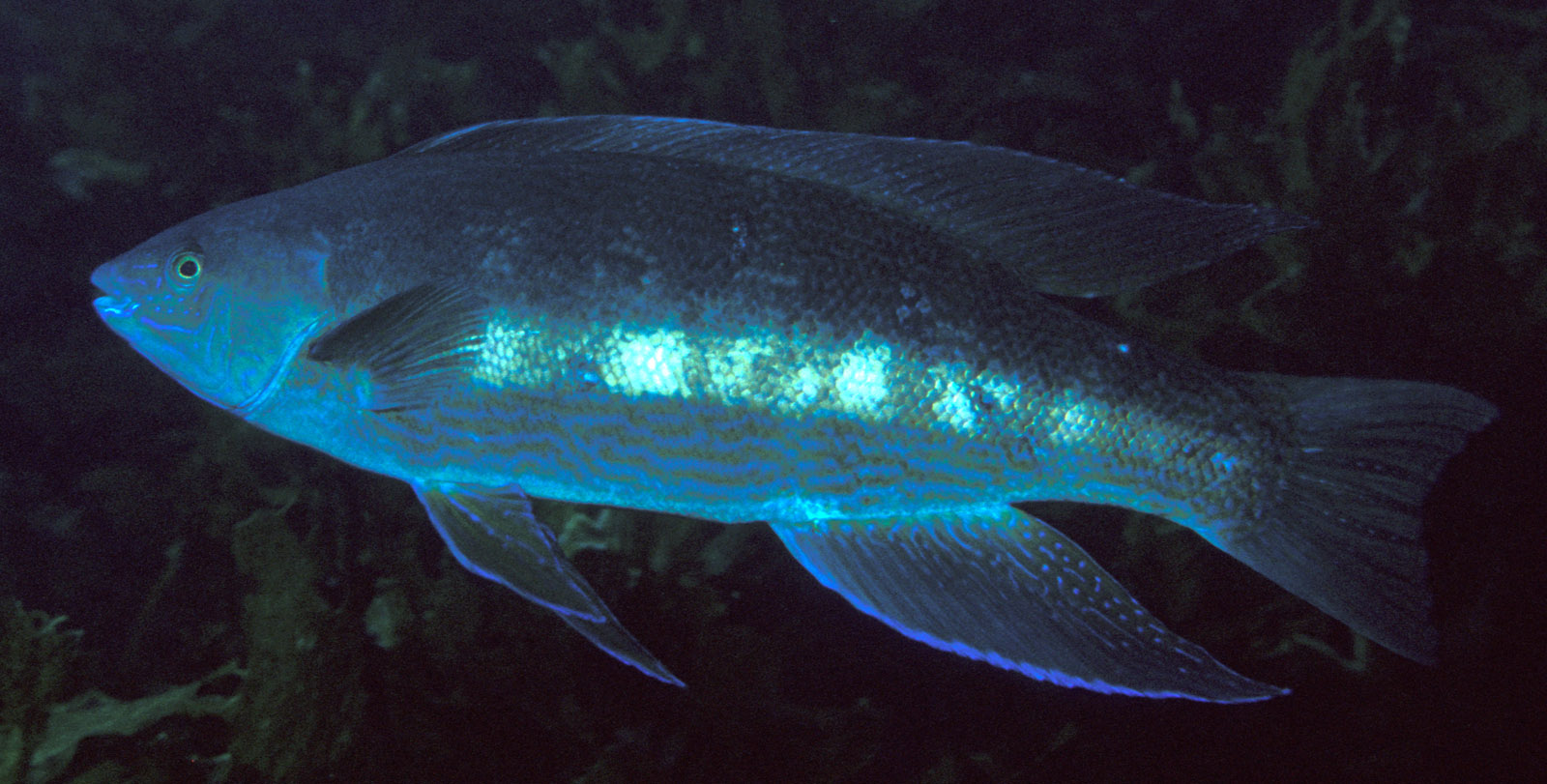
- Greenbone (Odax pullus)

Scientific classification
- Kingdom: Animalia
- Phylum: Chordata
- Class: Actinopterygii
- Order: Labriformes
- Family: Labridae
- Subfamily: Hypsigenyinae; Günther, 1861

Genera
- 15-17, see text

= Hypsigenyinae =

Hypsigenyinae Temporal range: Early Eocene to present

Subfamily of ray-finned fishes

The hypsigenyine wrasses or tuskfishes are saltwater fish of the subfamily Hypsigenyinae, a subgroup of the wrasse family (Labridae). The group is circumglobal, being found in almost all the of world's shallow tropical marine waters, although some species are also found in temperate zones. The former family Odacidae, containing the cales and weed whitings, is also now known to be nested within this subfamily.

== Taxonomy ==
Hypsigenyinae is the sister group to all other wrasse subfamilies. The group was first proposed in 1997. Since then, molecular phylogenetics has found that it also includes odacines and the genus Pseudodax. Odacines were once considered to be their own taxonomic family, but have been found nested deep within the hypsigenyine wrasses, and are the sister group to the hypsigenyine genus Choerodon. Odacines remain a monophyletic group however. Pseudodax was once considered to be the closest relative to parrotfish (tribe Scarini), but is now considered a basal hypsigenyine.

Westneat & Alfaro (2005) and Hughes et al (2022) found that the hogfish (Lachnolaimus maximus) is the sister group to all other hypsigenyine wrasses. However, neither study examined the natal wrasse (Anchichoerops natalensis), which was recovered as the actual sister group to all other hypsigenyine wrasses by Balwin et al (2023).

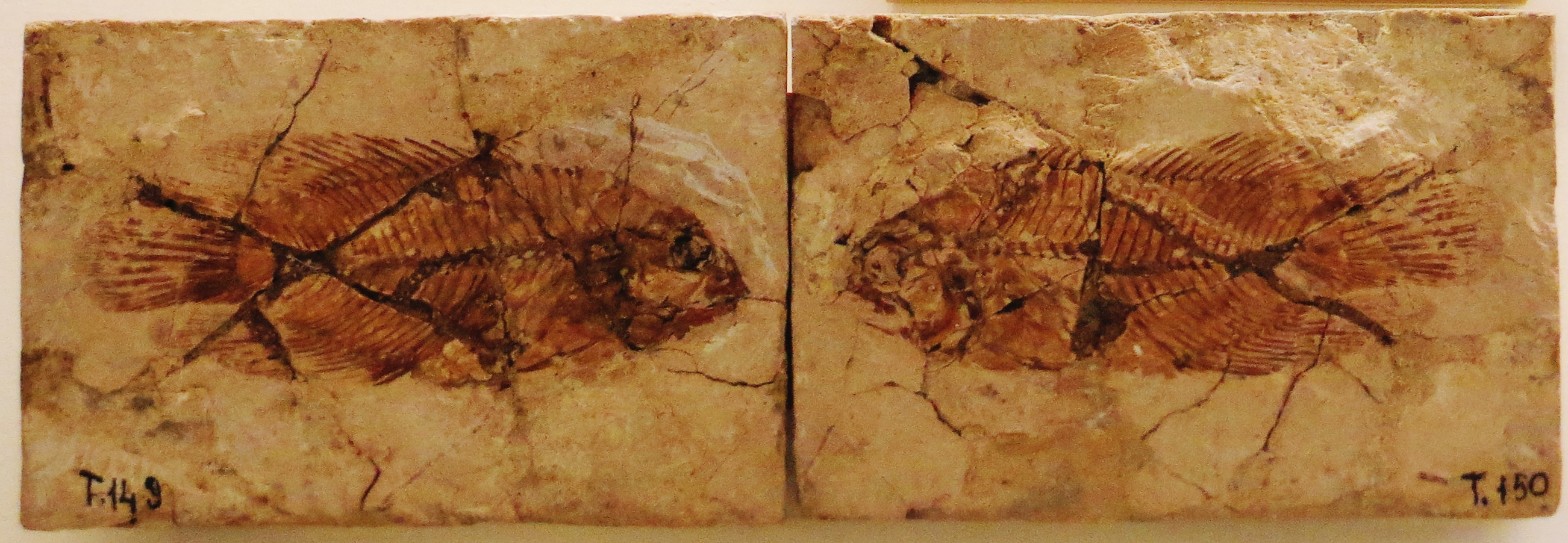
†Phyllopharyngodon longipinnis

Hypsigenyine wrasses exhibit several ancestral features shared with perciforms, but were subsequently lost in more derived wrasses. One example is the presence of vomerine teeth. Hypsigenyine wrasses also have a derived trait, which is phyllodont dentition of the pharyngeal teeth, ie, these teeth develop stacked on top of each other, with only the uppermost teeth in the stack emerging.

Unlike most wrasse groups, hypsigenyines are well-represented in the fossil record. The Italian fossil wrasse †Phyllopharyngodon is strongly supported to be a hypsigenyine because it exhibits phyllodont pharyngeal teeth like other members of the tribe, and is about 50 million years old, dating to the Eocene. The fossil genera Labrodon and Trigonodon are abundant in the Miocene of Europe.

Odacine wrasses are found in coastal waters off Southern Australia and New Zealand. They include species that feed on small invertebrates, as well as herbivorous grazers, some of which are able to feed on chemically unpleasant varieties of kelp otherwise unpalatable to fish.

== Genera ==
As per Eschmeyer's Catalog of Fishes (2026):

Genus		Image
Achoerodus T. N. Gill, 1863		A. viridis
Anchichoerops Barnard, 1927		
Bodianus Bloch, 1790		B. pulchellus
Choerodon Bleeker, 1840		C. cauteroma
Decodon Günther, 1861		D. puellaris
Lachnolaimus G. Cuvier, 1829		L. maximus
Polylepion M. F. Gomon, 1977		P. cruentum
Pseudodax Bleeker, 1861		P. moluccanus
Terelabrus J. E. Randall & Fourmanoir, 1998		T. rubrovittatus
Odacine clade	Haletta Whitley, 1947	H. semifasciata
Odacine clade	Heteroscarus Castelnau, 1872	H. acroptilus
Odacine clade	Neoodax Castelnau, 1875	N. balteatus
Odacine clade	Odax Valenciennes, 1840	O. pullus
Odacine clade	Olisthops Richardson, 1850	O. cyanomelas
Odacine clade	Sheardichthys Whitley, 1947	S. beddomei
Odacine clade	Siphonognathus Richardson, 1858	S. argyrophanes
