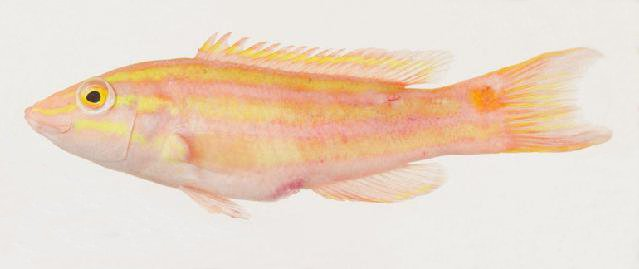
- P. russelli

Scientific classification
- Kingdom: Animalia
- Phylum: Chordata
- Class: Actinopterygii
- Order: Labriformes
- Family: Labridae
- Subfamily: Hypsigenyinae
- Genus: Polylepion; M. F. Gomon, 1977

Type species
- Bodianus russelli M. F. Gomon & J. E. Randall, 1975

= Polylepion =

Genus of fishes

Polylepion is a genus of wrasses native to the Pacific Ocean. It is also known as a bleeding wrasse. They are mostly found over sandy waters from Mexico to Nicaragua, including Cocos Island.

== Etymology ==
'Polylepion' is derived from the Greek adjective 'polys' meaning many, and the noun 'lepion' meaning small scales; referring to the relatively numerous lateral-line scales exhibited by species of this genus.

== Species ==
The genus contains three species:

Species	Common name	Image
Polylepion cruentum M. F. Gomon, 1977	bleeding wrasse	
Polylepion gilmorei Baldwin et al, 2023	Candystriped wrasse	
Polylepion russelli (M. F. Gomon & J. E. Randall, 1975)	Russell's striped hogfish	
