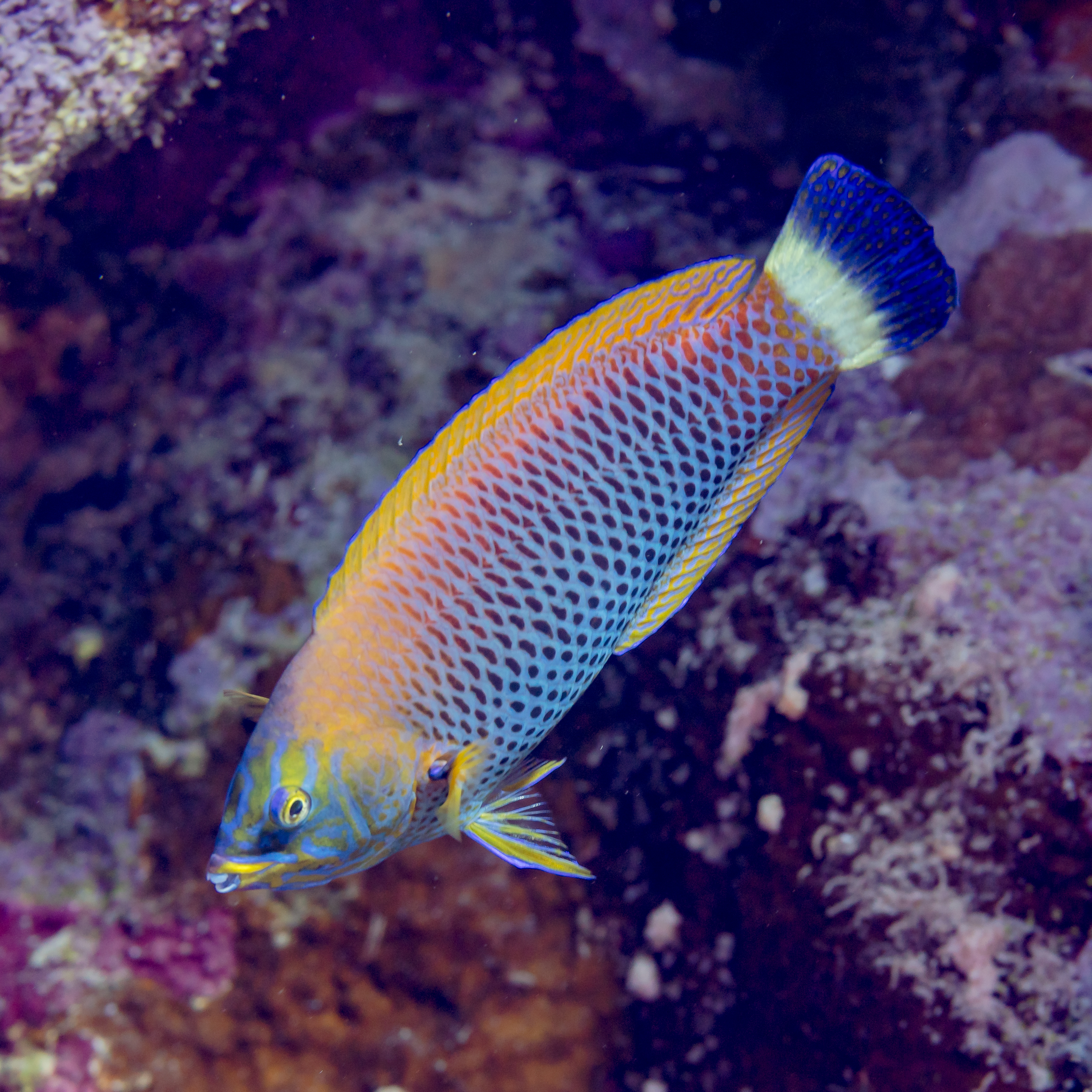

Conservation status
- Least Concern (IUCN 3.1)

Scientific classification
- Kingdom: Animalia
- Phylum: Chordata
- Class: Actinopterygii
- Order: Labriformes
- Family: Labridae
- Subfamily: Hypsigenyinae
- Genus: Pseudodax; Bleeker, 1861
- Species: P. moluccanus

Binomial name
- Pseudodax moluccanus (Valenciennes, 1840)

Synonyms
- Odax moluccanus Valenciennes, 1840

= Chiseltooth wrasse =

Species of fish

The chiseltooth wrasse (Pseudodax moluccanus) is a species of marine ray-finned fish, a wrasse from the family Labridae. It is native to the Indian Ocean and the western Pacific Ocean. It is an inhabitant of coral reefs and can be found at depths from 3 to 60 m (10 to 200 ft), though rarely deeper than 40 m (130 ft). This species grows to 30 cm (12 in) in total length. It is of minor importance to local commercial fisheries and can be found in the aquarium trade. P. moluccanus is the only known member of its genus.

== Distribution ==
The chisel tooth wrasse has a wide Indo-Pacific distribution from the western Indian Ocean from the Red Sea south to South Africa and eastwards to the Tuamotus, north to Japan and south to Lord Howe Island, Australia.

== Description ==
The chiseltooth wrasse is greyish to reddish-brown in background colour and there is a dark streak or spot on each scale on their body. They have a yellow upper lip which has a blue streak above it and they have, blue teeth. The caudal fin is black with a blue margin. The juveniles are pale blue with a wide stripe along the flanks while the subadult fish show a yellow band at the base of the tail. The juveniles of this species bear a strong resemblance to the cleaner wrasses of the genus Labroides and they also behave as cleaner fish. It has 11 spines and 12 rays in the dorsal fin while the anal fin has 3 spines and 14 soft rays. The maximum size reached is 30 centimetres (12 in) total length.

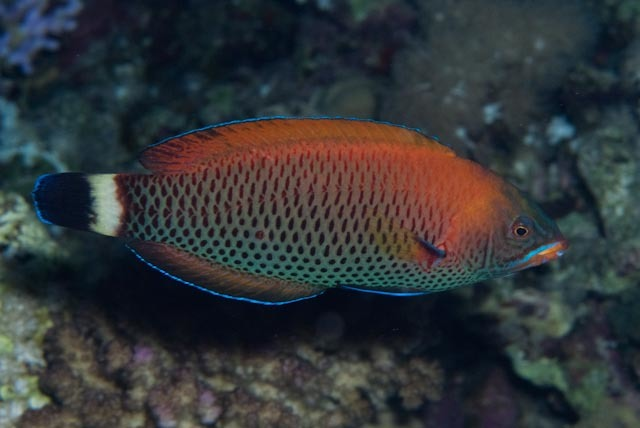
Adult

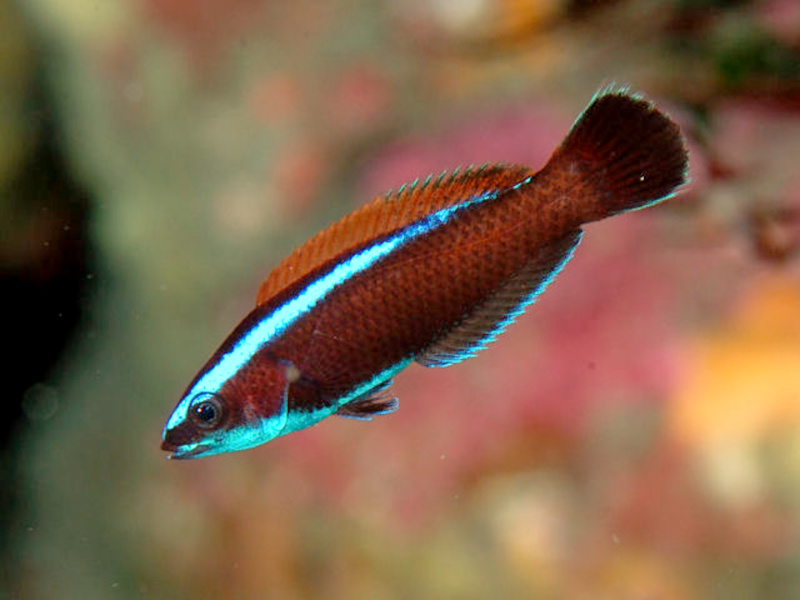
Juvenile

== Habitat and biology ==
The chisel tooth wrasse is found in clear channels and on the seaward edges of reefs at depths of 3 to 60 metres (10 to 200 ft). The juveniles are frequently recorded along drop-offs at depths lower than 18 metres (60 ft). The adult fish occur in the vicinity of caves while the juveniles often live within them. The adults are solitary and have a diet of algae and small invertebrates. The juveniles have been recorded behaving as cleaner fish. This species is regarded as being closely related to the parrotfishes of the family Scaridae because of the pattern of teeth in its mouth but in behaviour is more like a species in the genus Anampses.
