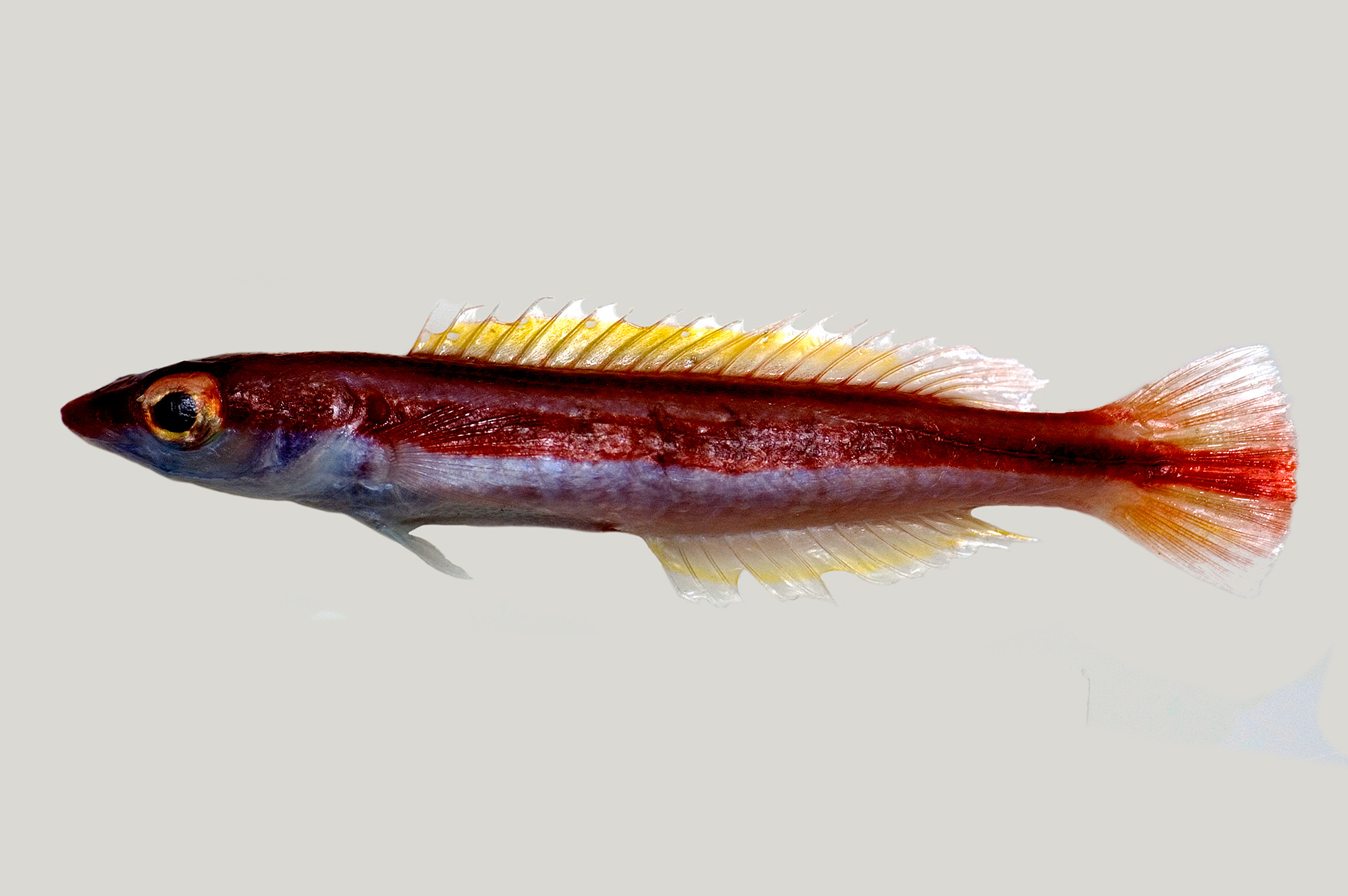
- White-striped hogfish (T. rubrovittatus)

Scientific classification
- Kingdom: Animalia
- Phylum: Chordata
- Class: Actinopterygii
- Order: Labriformes
- Family: Labridae
- Subfamily: Hypsigenyinae
- Genus: Terelabrus; J. E. Randall & Fourmanoir, 1998

Type species
- Terelabrus rubrovittatus Randall & Fourmanoir, 1998

= Terelabrus =

Genus of fishes

Terelabrus is a genus of fish in the family Labridae found in the Indian and Pacific Ocean.

== Species ==
There are currently 5 recognized species in this genus:

- Terelabrus dewapyle Y. Fukui & Motomura, 2015 (Yellow-striped hogfish)
- Terelabrus flavocephalus Y. Fukui & Motomura, 2016 (Red-lined hogfish)
- Terelabrus rubrovittatus J. E. Randall & Fourmanoir, 1998 (White-striped hogfish)
- Terelabrus toretore Shepherd, Pinheiro, Phelps, Siu & L. A. Rocha 2023
- Terelabrus zonalis Y. Fukui, 2018
