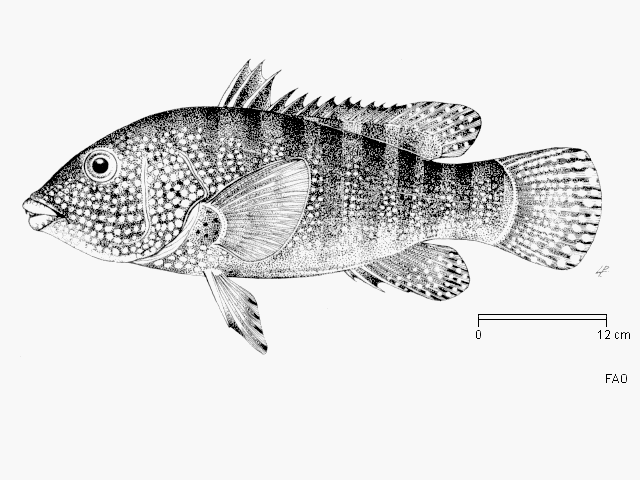

Conservation status
- Least Concern (IUCN 3.1)

Scientific classification
- Kingdom: Animalia
- Phylum: Chordata
- Class: Actinopterygii
- Order: Labriformes
- Family: Labridae
- Subfamily: Hypsigenyinae
- Genus: Anchichoerops; Barnard, 1927
- Species: A. natalensis

Binomial name
- Anchichoerops natalensis (Gilchrist & W. W. Thompson, 1909)

Synonyms
- Choerops natalensis Gilchrist & W. W. Thompson, 1909

= Natal wrasse =

Species of fish

The natal wrasse, Anchichoerops natalensis, is a species of wrasse native to the Indian Ocean coasts of South Africa and Mozambique. It prefers areas with rocky substrates and can be found down to about 60 m (200 ft). This species grows to a length of 75 cm (30 in). This fish is of minor importance to local commercial fisheries and is popular as a game fish. This species is the only known member of its genus.
