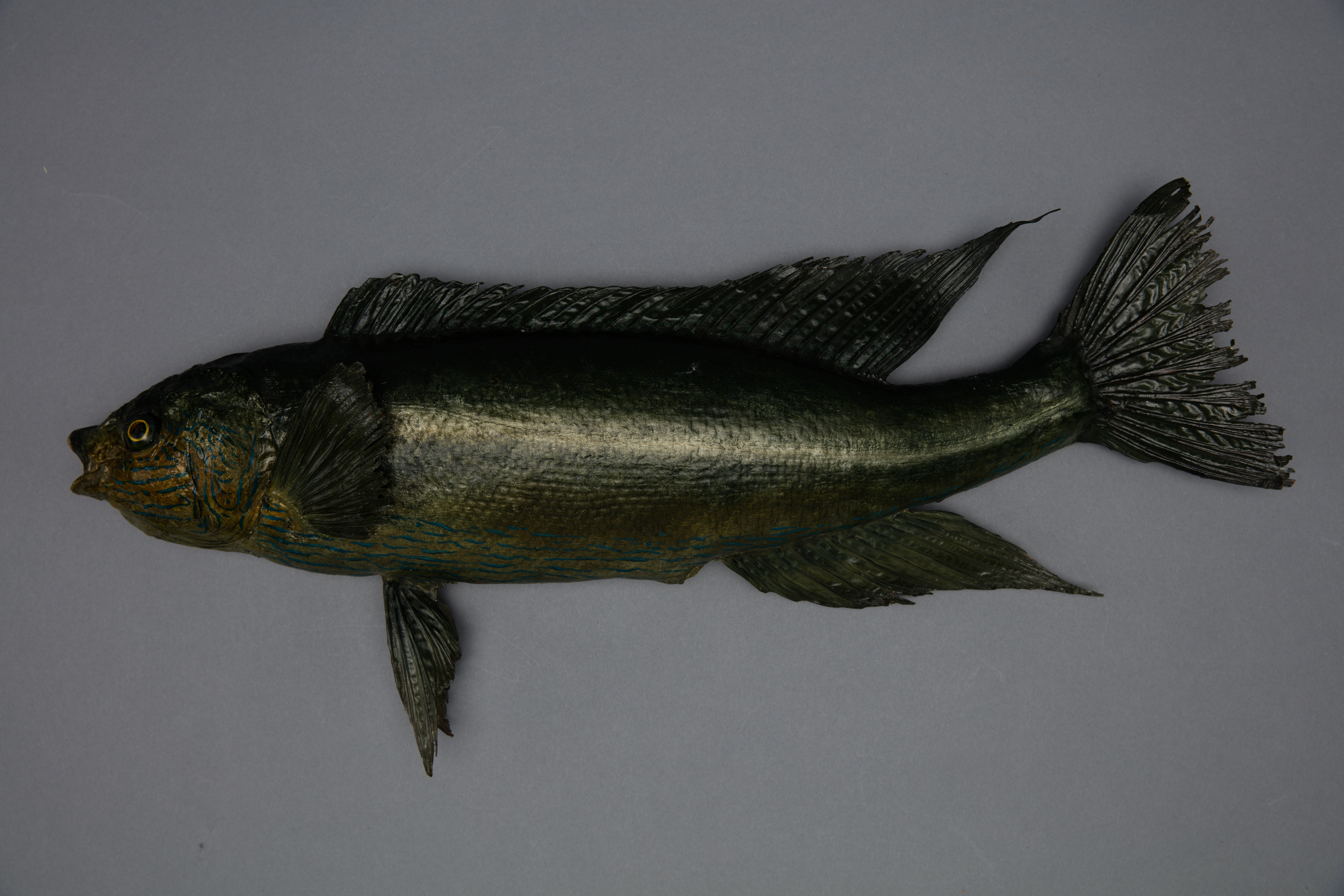

Conservation status
- Least Concern (IUCN 3.1)

Scientific classification
- Kingdom: Animalia
- Phylum: Chordata
- Class: Actinopterygii
- Order: Labriformes
- Family: Labridae
- Genus: Odax
- Species: O. cyanoallix

Binomial name
- Odax cyanoallix Ayling & Paxton, 1983

= Bluefinned butterfish =

Species of ray-finned fish

The bluefinned butterfish (Odax cyanoallix) a species of marine ray-finned fish, a weed whiting from the family Odacidae, which is found only around Three Kings Islands about 80 km north of New Zealand. It is found in shallow reef areas where brown seaweed is abundant. This species can reach a length of 27 centimetres (11 in) SL. It is of minor importance to local commercial fisheries. Isolated individuals have been recorded elsewhere around the northern North Island.
