= Terelabrus toretore =

Scientific classification
- Kingdom: Animalia
- Phylum: Chordata
- Class: Actinopterygii
- Order: Labriformes
- Family: Labridae
- Genus: Terelabrus
- Species: T. toretore

Binomial name
- Terelabrus toretore Shepherd, Pinheiro, Phelps, Siu & L. A. Rocha 2023

Species of fish

Terelabrus toretore is a species of wrasse native to deep reefs in Tahiti, French Polynesia. It was originally described based on two specimens collected in the mesophotic zone of a coral reef off the coast of Tahiti, the species has a bright red color with a horizontal white stripe dividing the body and a yellow tail.
