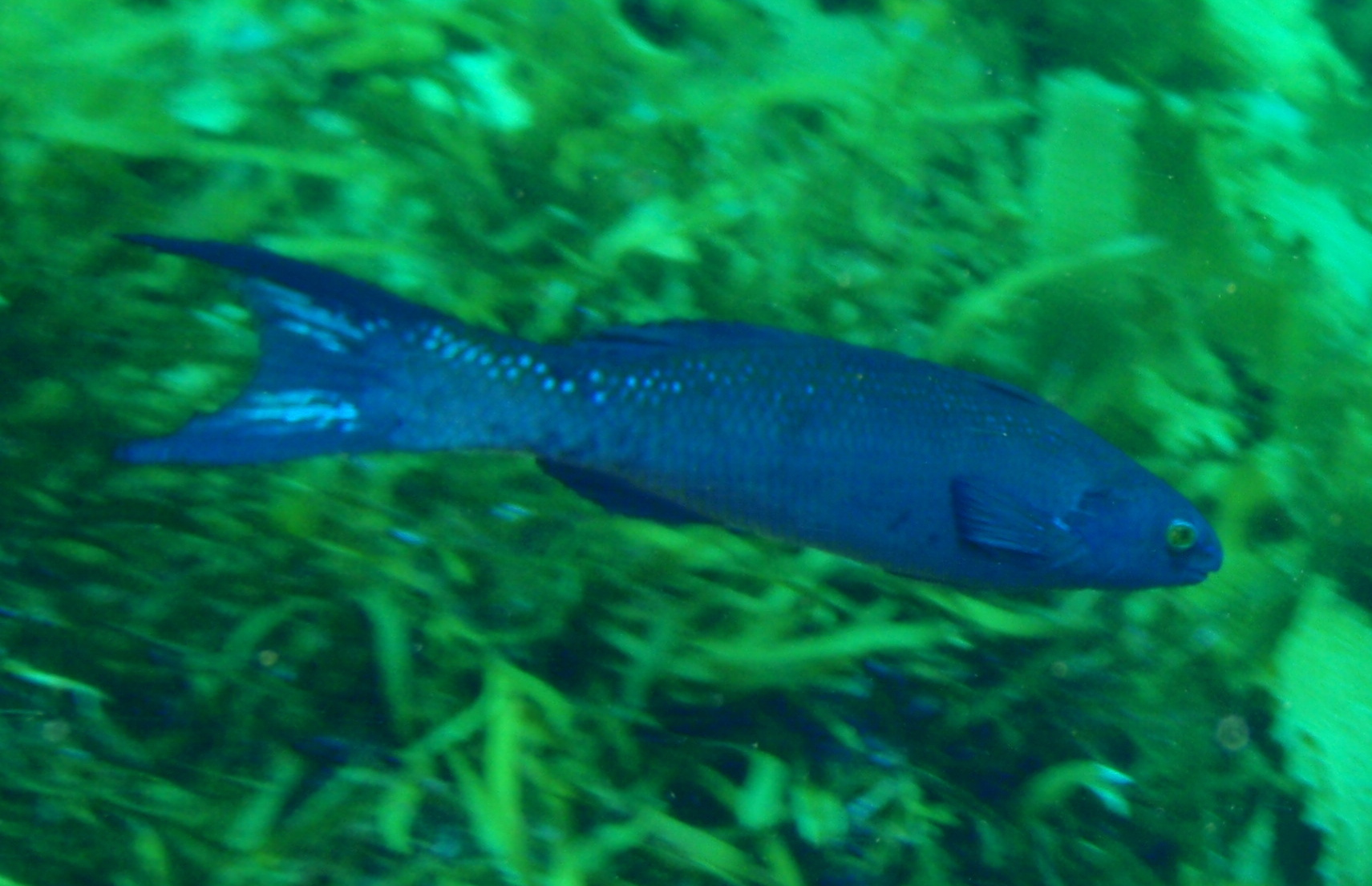

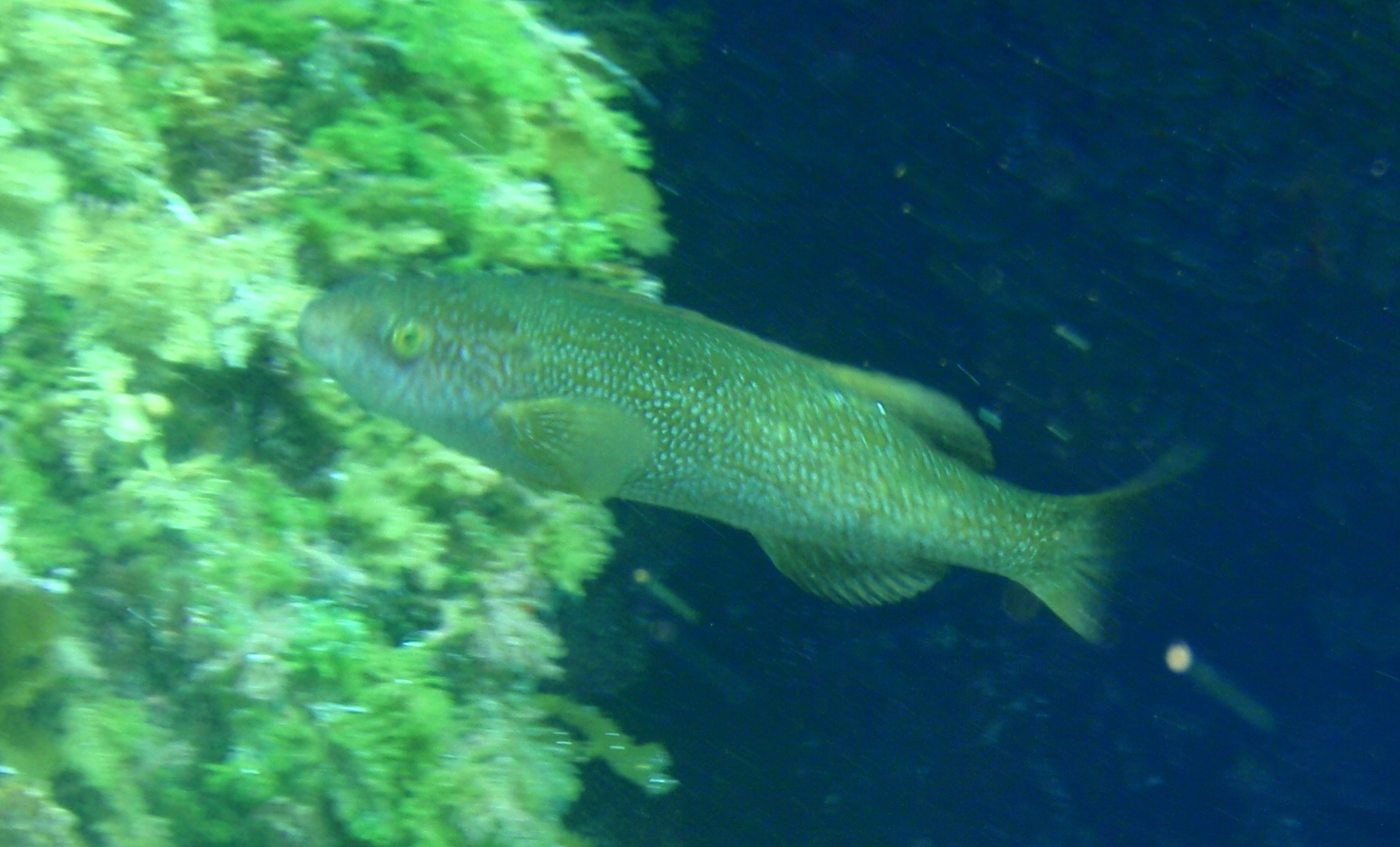
- Terminal phase (top); Initial phase (bottom)

Conservation status
- Least Concern (IUCN 3.1)

Scientific classification
- Kingdom: Animalia
- Phylum: Chordata
- Class: Actinopterygii
- Order: Labriformes
- Family: Labridae
- Subfamily: Hypsigenyinae
- Genus: Olisthops; Richardson, 1850
- Species: O. cyanomelas

Binomial name
- Olisthops cyanomelas Richardson, 1850

Synonyms
- Odax cyanomelas (Richardson, 1850); Olistherops brunneus Macleay, 1878; Olistherops brownii Johnston, 1884; Odax nebulosus Saville-Kent, 1893

= Herring cale =

Species of ray-finned fish

The herring cale (Olisthops cyanomelas) is a species of ray-finned fish, a weed whiting from the family Labridae, which is endemic to Australia where it is found along the southern and southeastern coast. It inhabits the surf zone, ranging to a depth of 30 m (100 ft) in rocky areas with plentiful growth of brown algae, which it feeds on. This species grows to a length of 51 cm (20 in) SL. This species is the only known member of the genus Olisthops, but it has frequently been placed in Odax instead.

== Gallery ==
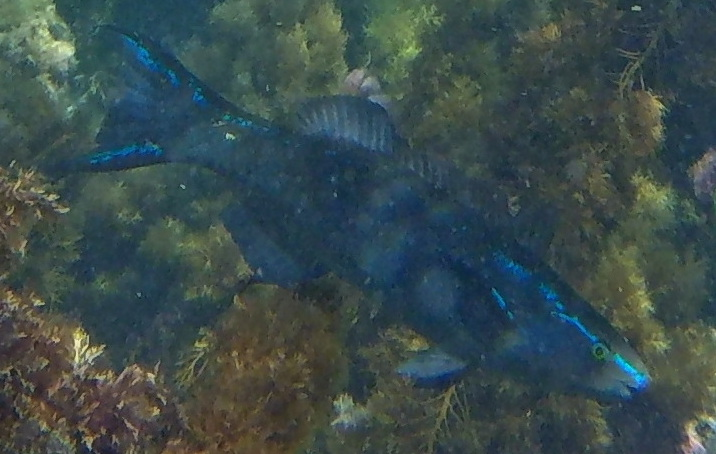
Terminal phase

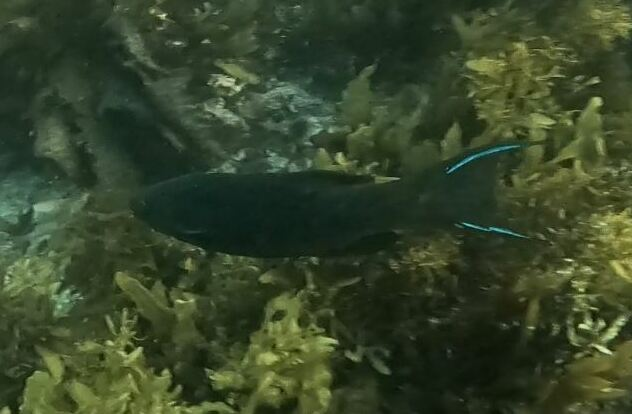
Terminal phase

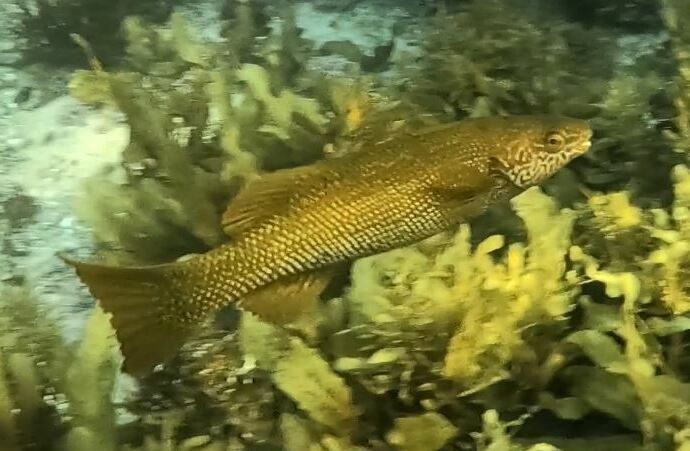
Initial phase
