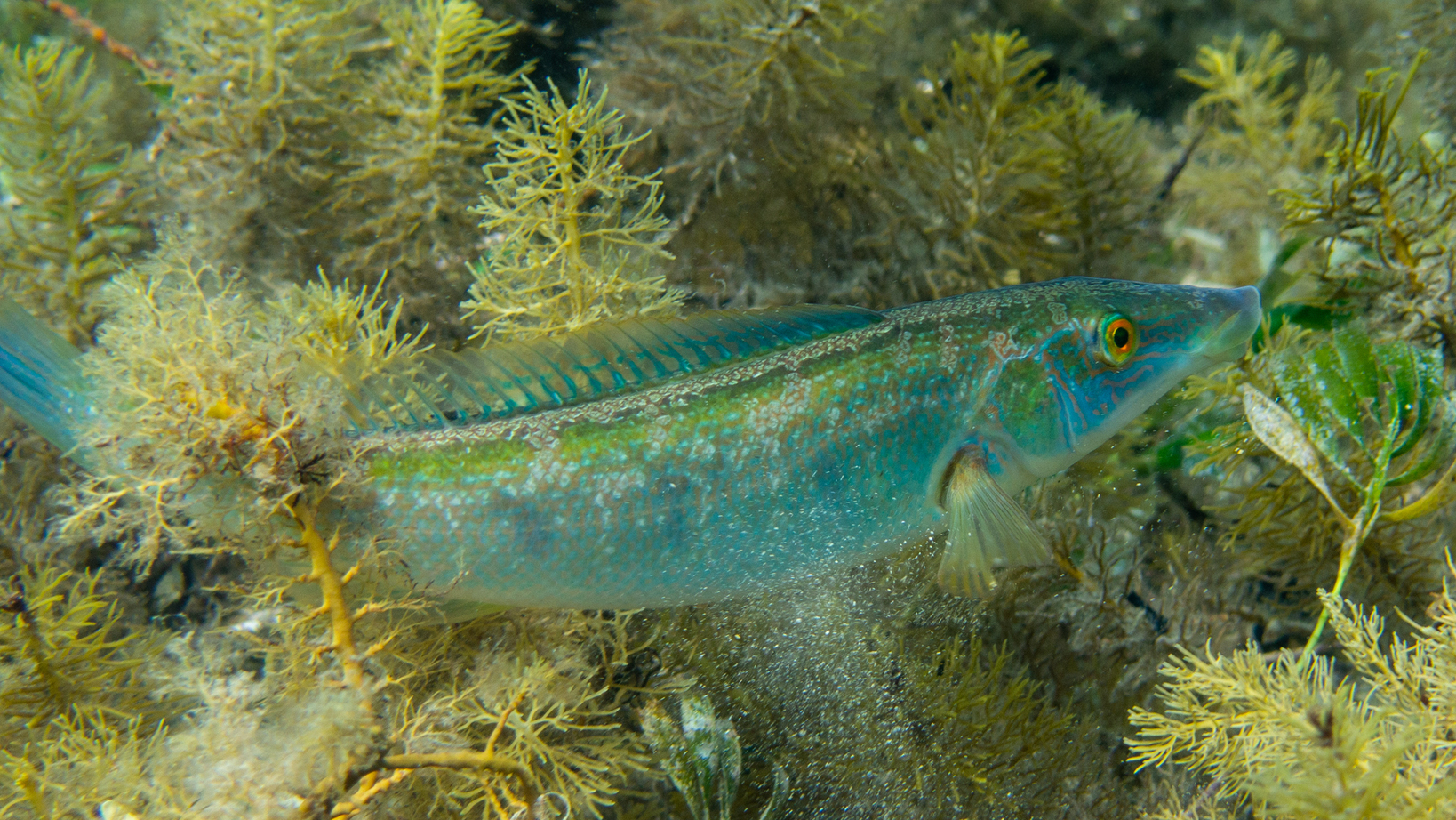

Conservation status
- Least Concern (IUCN 3.1)

Scientific classification
- Kingdom: Animalia
- Phylum: Chordata
- Class: Actinopterygii
- Order: Labriformes
- Family: Labridae
- Subfamily: Hypsigenyinae
- Genus: Haletta; Whitley, 1947
- Species: H. semifasciata

Binomial name
- Haletta semifasciata (Valenciennes, 1840)

Synonyms
- Odax semifasciatus Valenciennes, 1840; Julis dringii J. Richardson, 1843; Odax richardsonii Günther, 1862; Odax hyrtlii Steindachner, 1866

= Blue weed whiting =

Species of ray-finned fish

The blue weed whiting (Haletta semifasciata) is a species of ray-finned fish, a weed whiting from the family Labridae, which is endemic to Australia where it is only found along the southern coast. It is found in brackish and marine waters in sheltered locations at depths of from 1 to 7 metres (3.3 to 23.0 ft). This species inhabits areas with a substrate of sand with beds of seagrass where it feeds on small invertebrates and algae and the seagrasses themselves. This species grows to a length of 29 centimetres (11 in) SL. It is of minor importance to local commercial fisheries. This species is the only known member of its genus.

== Gallery ==
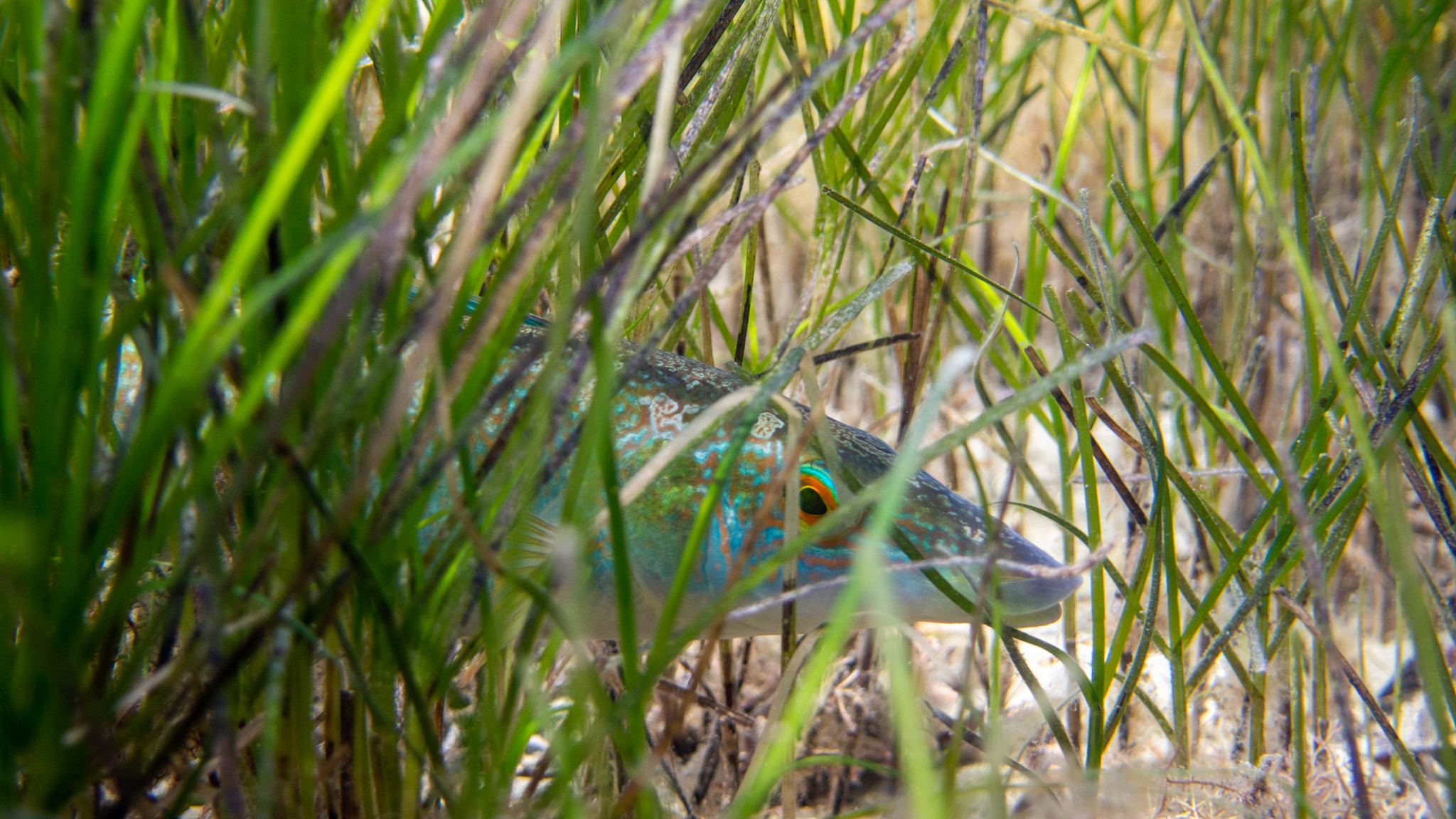

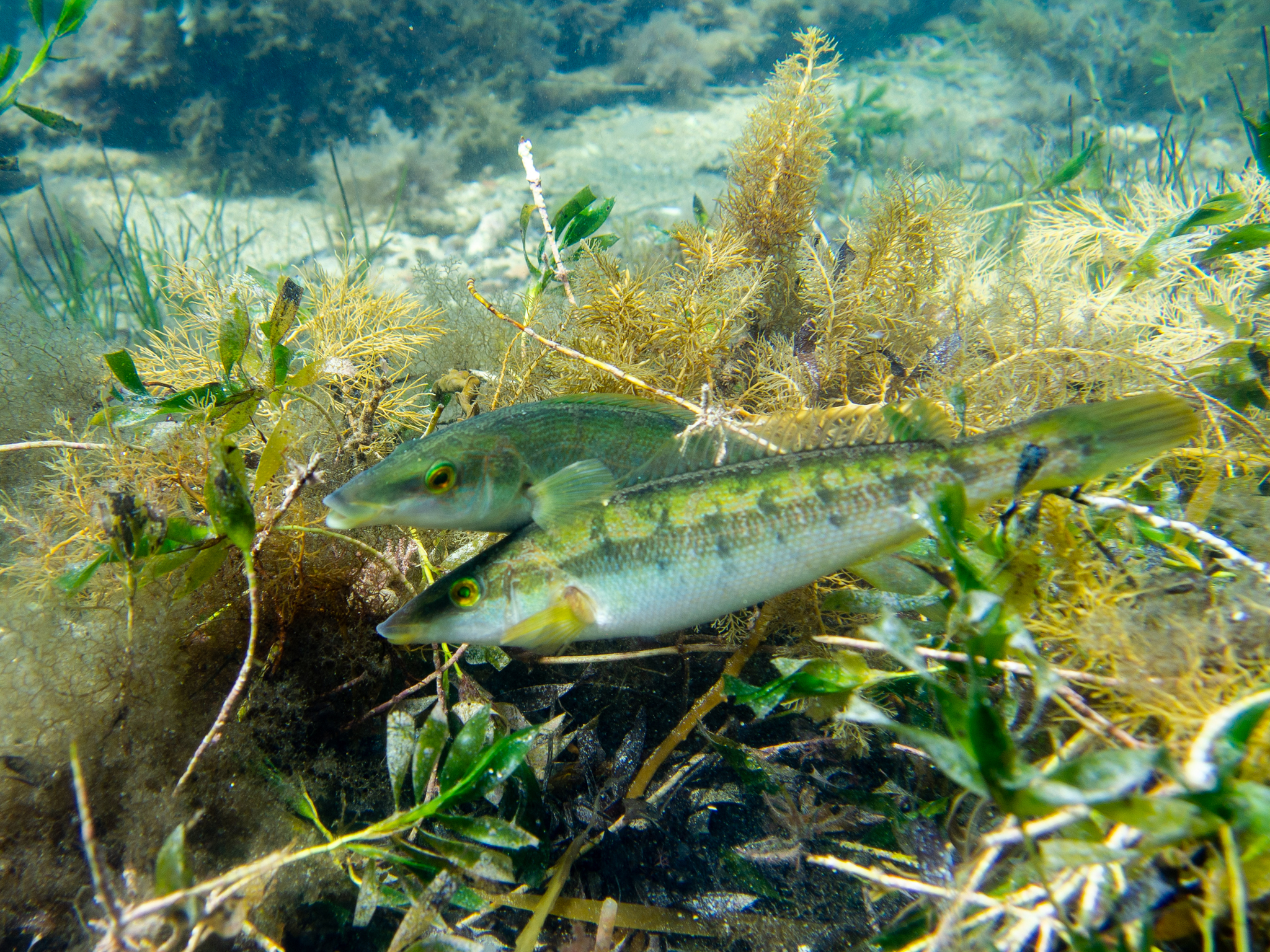

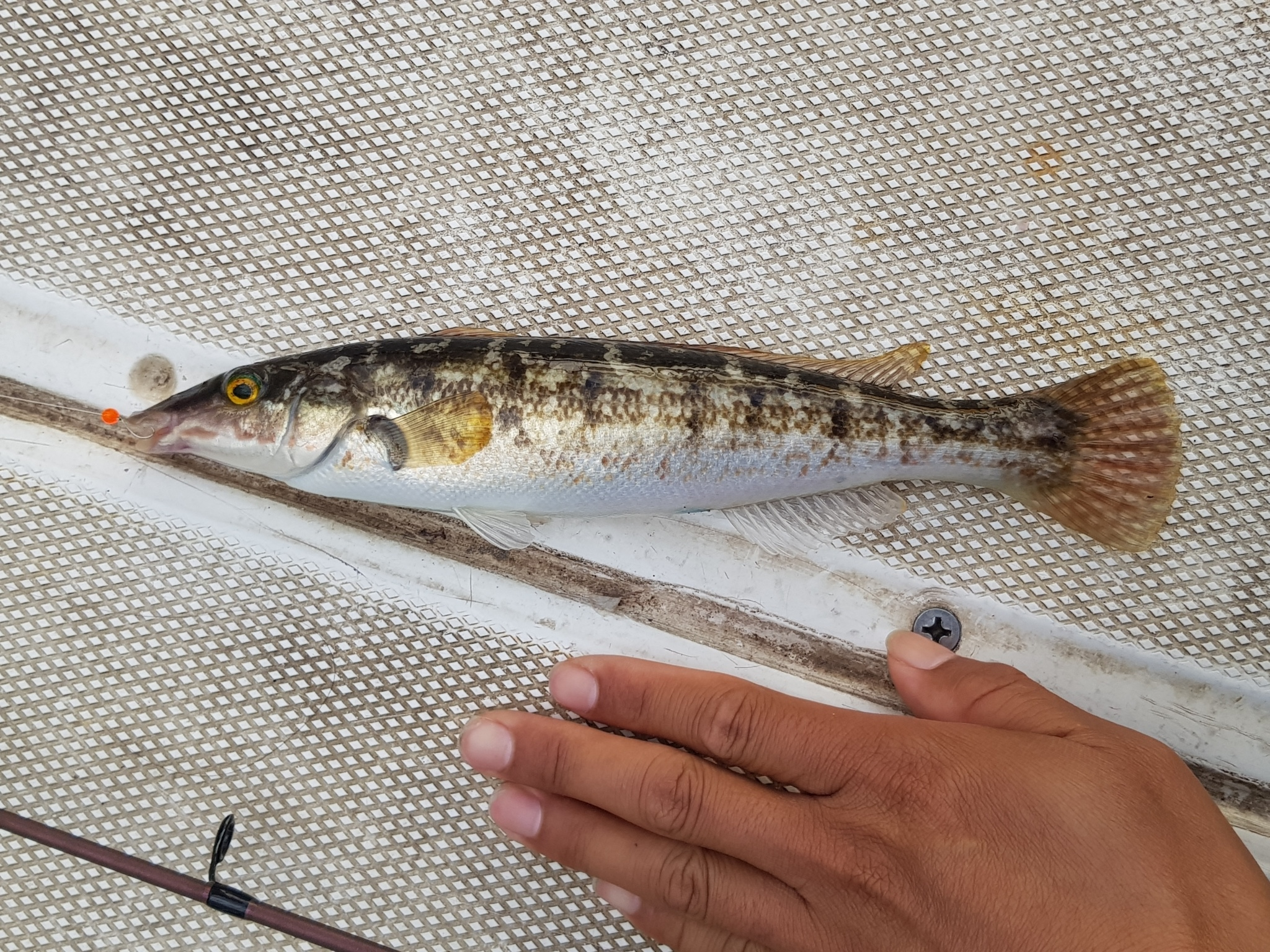

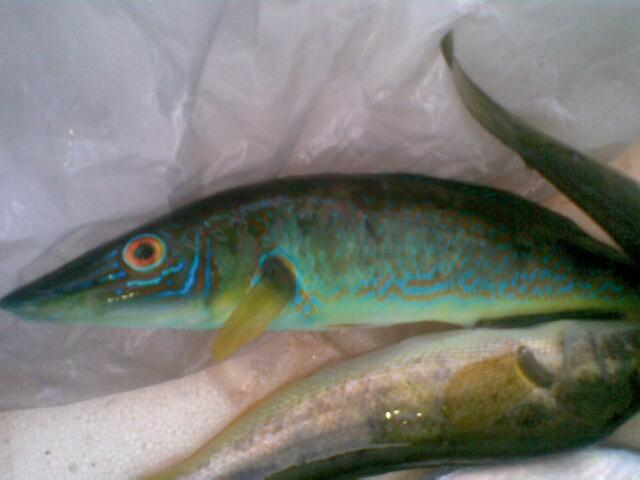
