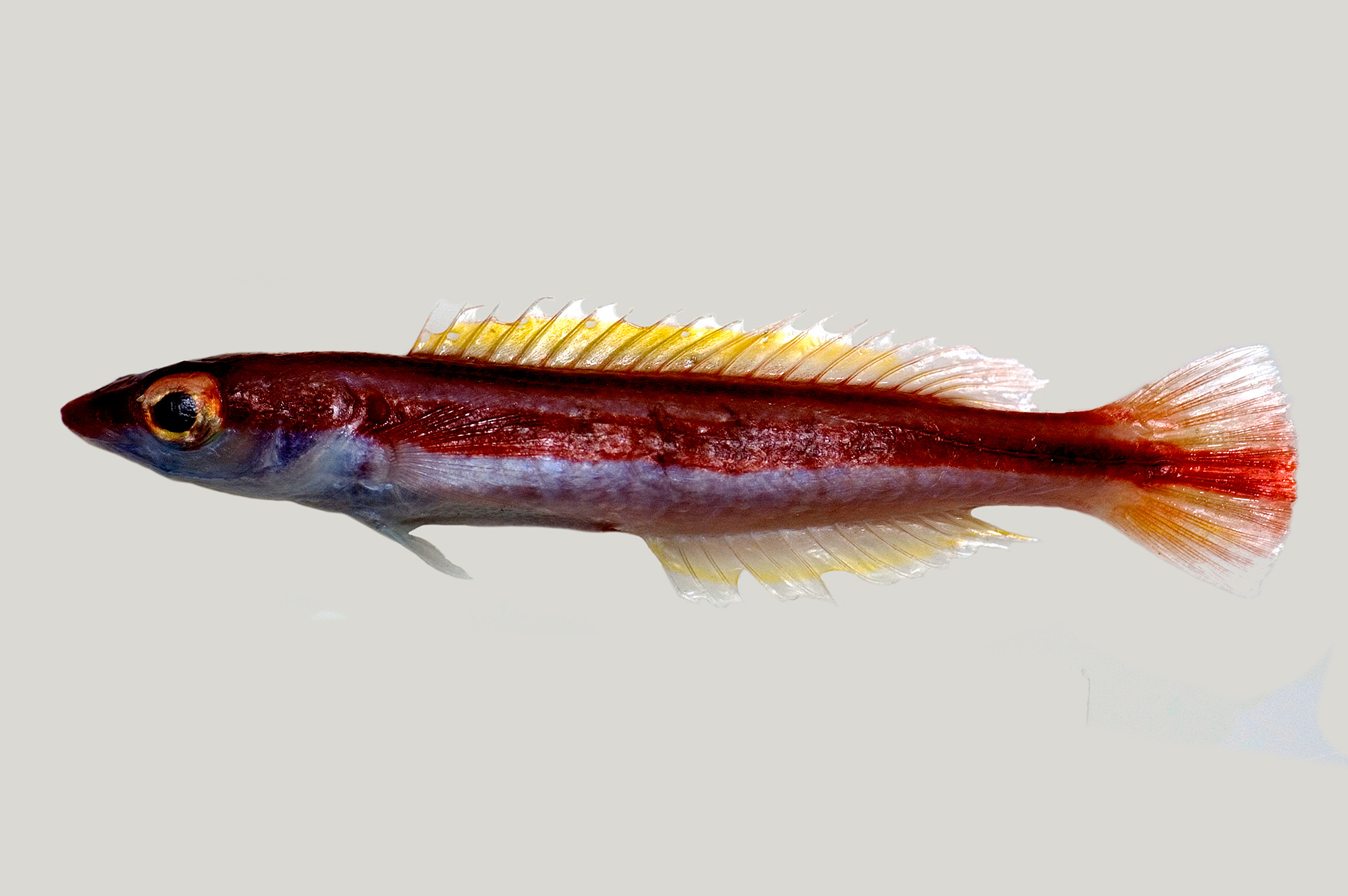

Conservation status
- Least Concern (IUCN 3.1)

Scientific classification
- Kingdom: Animalia
- Phylum: Chordata
- Class: Actinopterygii
- Division: Teleostei
- Order: Labriformes
- Family: Labridae
- Genus: Terelabrus
- Species: T. rubrovittatus

Binomial name
- Terelabrus rubrovittatus J. E. Randall & Fourmanoir, 1998

= Terelabrus rubrovittatus =

Species of fish

Terelabrus rubrovittatus, also known as the white-striped hogfish, is a species of wrasse native to the central western Pacific Ocean. It occurs on outer reefs in deeper waters at depths from 50 to 100 m (160 to 330 ft). This species grows to 12 cm (4.7 in) in total length.
