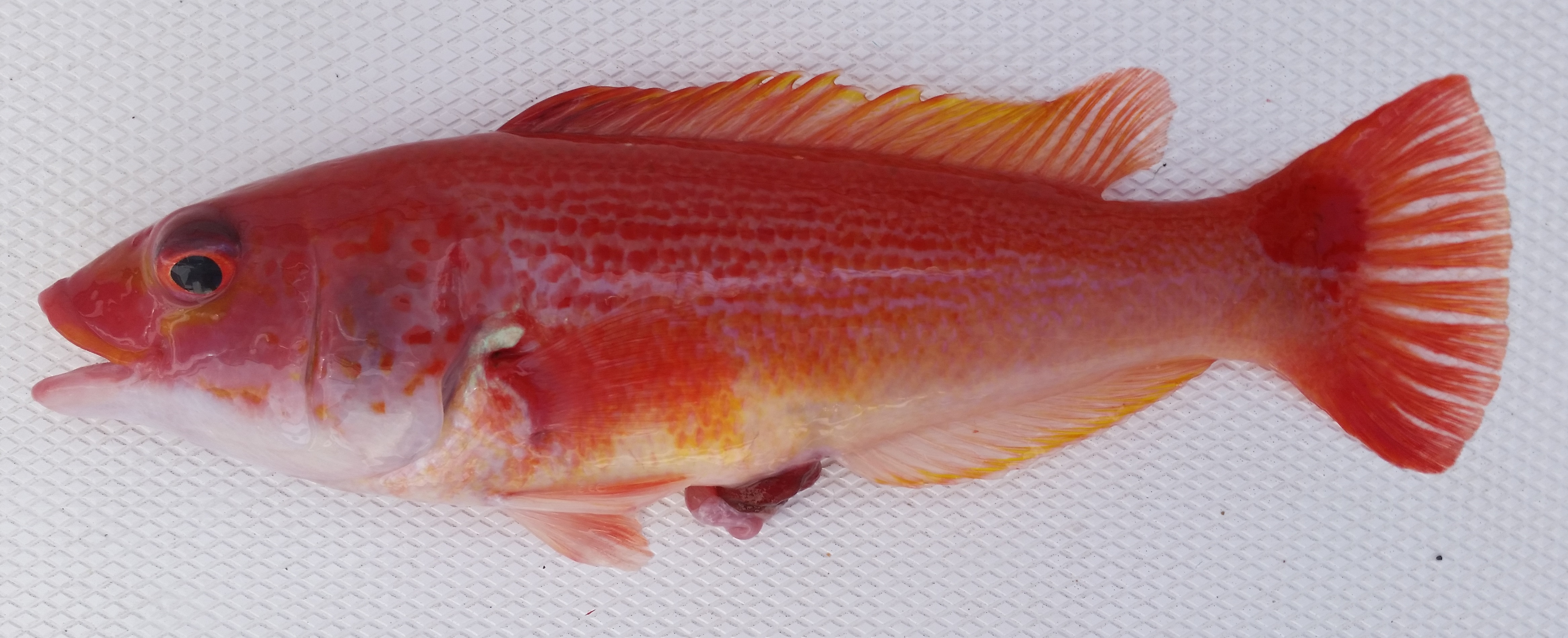

Conservation status
- Data Deficient (IUCN 3.1)

Scientific classification
- Kingdom: Animalia
- Phylum: Chordata
- Class: Actinopterygii
- Order: Labriformes
- Family: Labridae
- Genus: Polylepion
- Species: P. cruentum

Binomial name
- Polylepion cruentum Gomon, 1977
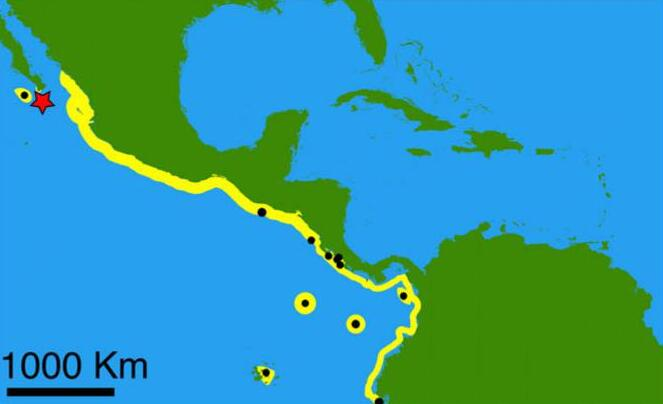

= Bleeding wrasse =

Species of fish

The bleeding wrasse (Polylepion cruentum) is a species of marine ray-finned fish from the family Labridae, the wrasses. It is found in reefs in the eastern central Pacific Ocean.

== Description ==
The bleeding wrasse is relatively slender for a wrasse and its body tapers noticeably towards its tail. It has large eyes and a horizontal mouth which reaches to the eye, in front of the pupil. The largest males have been measured at a total length of 24 centimetres (9.4 in). The adults are red on their heads and upper body with a whitish underside, there are three or four yellow horizontal stripes on the upper flanks and curved yellow stripes on the head. The spiny part of the dorsal fin is black with two pink stripes in the rear portion of that fin and a yellow margin. The anal fin is white with a wide yellow edge, the pelvic fins are also white and the pectoral fins are transparent but have a wide blood-red bar at their base. At the base of the dorsal lobe of the caudal fin there is a large oval-shaped red spot which becomes indistinct in the biggest fish. The juveniles are pink in colour with more yellow stripes than the adults and a large black blotch on dorsal part of the caudal peduncle.

== Distribution ==
The bleeding wrasse is found in the central eastern Pacific Ocean from Mexico to Nicaragua, including the Cocos Islands of Costa Rica. Its range may extend south as far as Colombia and Ecuador.

== Habitat and biology ==
The bleeding wrasse is found at depths of 150–200 metres (490–660 ft) over areas with a sandy substrate near gravel and rocky reefs. It feeds on gastropods, bivalves, crustaceans and worms. It is an oviparous species which pais during spawning and the eggs and larvae are pelagic.
