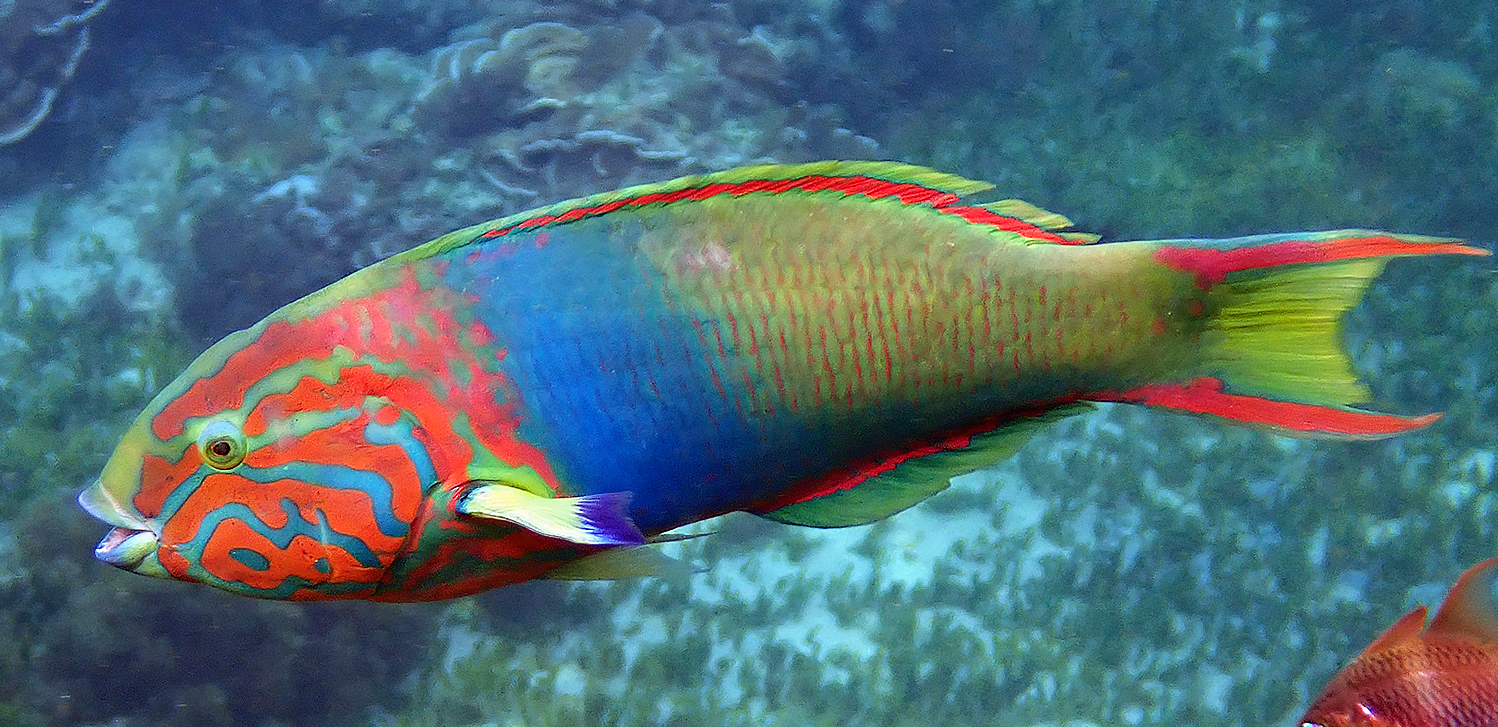
- Sunset wrasse (Thalassoma lutescens)
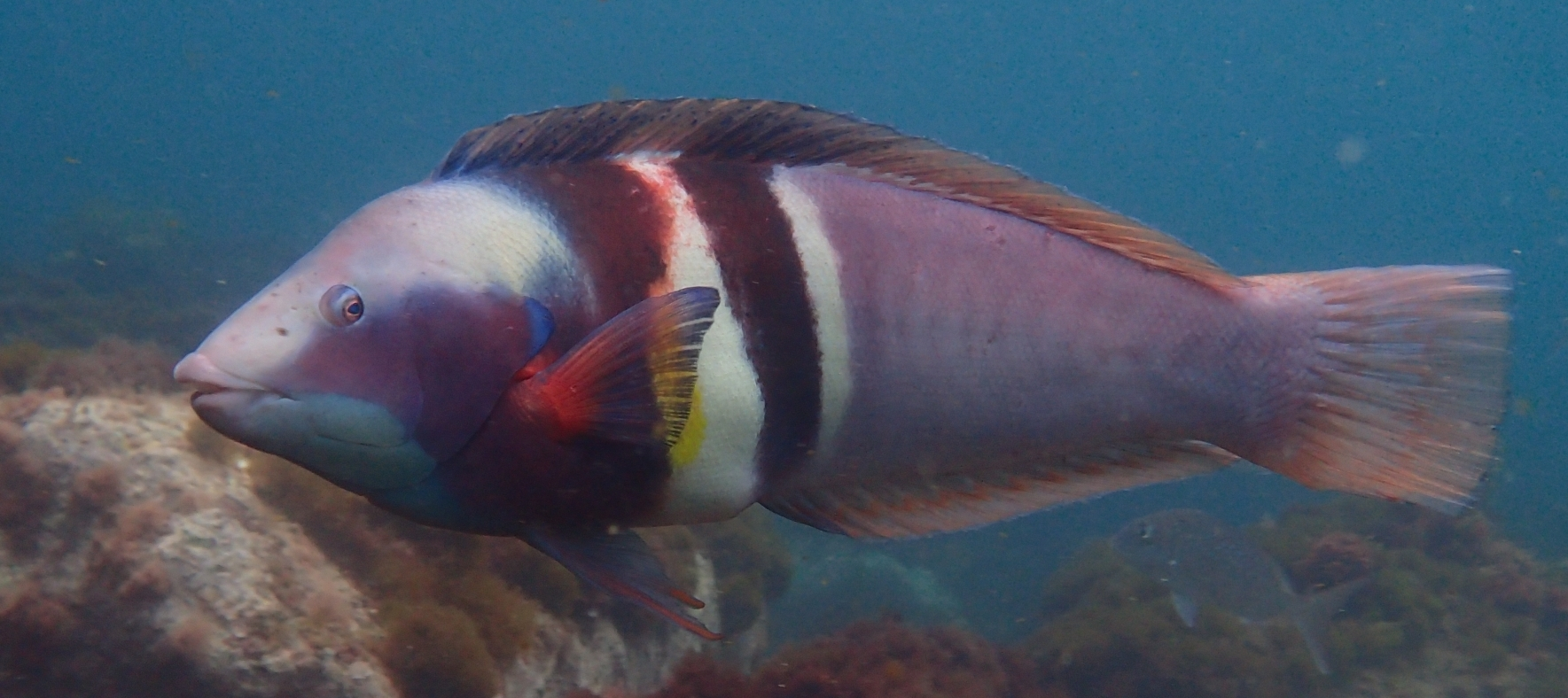
- Eastern king wrasse (Coris sandeyeri)

Scientific classification
- Kingdom: Animalia
- Phylum: Chordata
- Class: Actinopterygii
- Division: Teleostei
- Order: Labriformes
- Family: Labridae
- Subfamily: Julidinae; Bonaparte, 1841

Genera
- 20., see text

= Julidinae =

Julidinae Temporal range: Middle Miocene to present Possible Early Eocene record

Tribe of fishes

The julidine wrasses are saltwater fish of the subfamily Julidinae, a subgroup of the wrasse family (Labridae). It contains the highest number of genera and species out of all the wrasse tribes, with 20 genera and over 200 species, comprising almost a third of all wrasse species.

== Taxonomy ==
A 2005 molecular phylogenetic analysis strongly supports the monophyly of this clade. It was formerly treated as the tribe Julidini, but is now recognized as its own subfamily by Eschmeyer's Catalog of Fishes.

Coris bulbifrons, Stethojulis bandanensis, Anampses elegans, and Thalassoma lutescens. At Norfolk Island.

It also found that the cleaner wrasse genera that traditionally comprised the tribe Labrichthyini (Labrichthys, Labropsis, Diproctacanthus, Larabicus, and Labroides), although forming a monophyletic group, were all nested within Julidini. Labrichthys is the sister group to the other cleaner wrasse genera, and does not act as a cleaner; it is an obligate corallivore for its entire life. Larabicus, Diproctacanthus, and Labropsis are cleaners only as juveniles and feed on corals as adults, while Labroides is a cleaner for its entire life. The subfamily Pseudolabrinae is likely the sister group of Julidinae, if not nested within the Julidinae; the former is additionally supported by Hughes et al 2023.

Several genera in this tribe are problematic. Most notably, Halichoeres and Coris are paraphyletic or polyphyletic. Gomphosus has also been repeatedly found nested within Thalassoma.

The difficulty in resolving relationships within Julidini is a result of the rapid speciation of julidine wrasses.

== Evolution ==
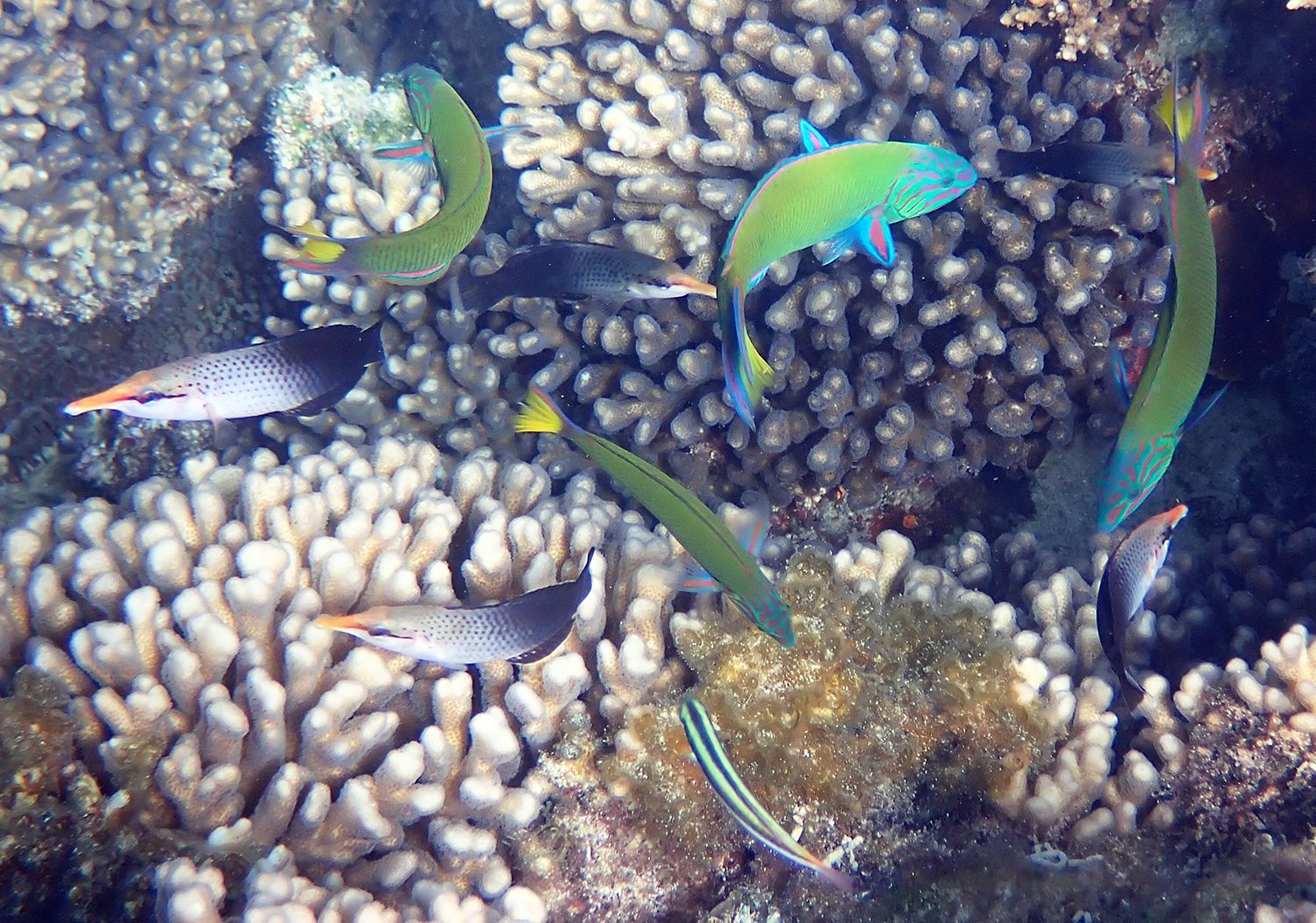
Thalassoma lunare with Gomphosus varius. At Norfolk Island.

The tribe Julidini likely originated in the Eocene. It is hypothesized that the relatively warm and stable climate that followed the Early Eocene Climactic Optimum may have played a part in the diversification of julidine wrasses. Fossil julidine wrasses such as †Coris sigismundi have been found in rocks dating to the Miocene. Potential fossil julidines such as †Eocoris Bannikov & Sorbini, 2010 and †Paralabrus Bannikov & Zorzini, 2019 are known as early as the Eocene, though their placement in this subfamily is uncertain.

== Genera ==
Based on Eschmeyer's Catalog of Fishes (2025):

Genera	Image
Anampses Quoy & Gaimard, 1824	A. twistii
Coris Lacépède, 1801	C. bulbifrons
Diproctacanthus Bleeker, 1862	D. xanthurus
Frontilabrus Randall & Condé, 1989	
Gomphosus Lacépède, 1801	G. varius
Halichoeres Rüppell, 1835	H. hortulanus
Hemigymnus Günther, 1861	H. fasciatus
Hologymnosus Lacépède, 1801	H. annulatus
Labrichthys Bleeker, 1854	L. unilineatus
Labroides Bleeker, 1851	L. dimidiatus
Labropsis P. J. Schmidt, 1931	L. alleni
Larabicus Randall & Springer, 1973	L. quadrilineatus
Leptojulis Bleeker, 1862	L. cyanopleura
Macropharyngodon Bleeker, 1862	M. geoffroy
Minilabrus Randall & Dor, 1981	
Ophthalmolepis Bleeker, 1862	O. lineolata
Parajulis Bleeker, 1865	P. poecileptera
Pseudocoris Bleeker, 1862	P. bleekeri
Pseudojuloides Fowler, 1949	P. elongatus
Stethojulis Günther, 1861	S. trilineata
Thalassoma Swainson, 1839	T. rueppellii
Xenojulis de Beaufort, 1939	X. margaritaceus
