= Frontilabrus =

Conservation status
- Data Deficient (IUCN 3.1)

Scientific classification
- Kingdom: Animalia
- Phylum: Chordata
- Class: Actinopterygii
- Division: Teleostei
- Order: Labriformes
- Family: Labridae
- Subfamily: Julidinae
- Genus: Frontilabrus; J. E. Randall & Condé, 1989
- Species: F. caeruleus

Binomial name
- Frontilabrus caeruleus J. E. Randall & Condé, 1989

Species of fish

Frontilabrus caeruleus is a species of wrasse native to the Indian Ocean waters around the Maldives. This species grows to a standard length of 9.4 cm (3.7 in). It has also been displayed in public aquaria. This species is the only known member of its genus.
