= Pseudojuloides cerasinus =

Conservation status
- Data Deficient (IUCN 3.1)

Scientific classification
- Kingdom: Animalia
- Phylum: Chordata
- Class: Actinopterygii
- Order: Labriformes
- Family: Labridae
- Genus: Pseudojuloides
- Species: P. cerasinus

Binomial name
- Pseudojuloides cerasinus (Snyder, 1904)

Synonyms
- Pseudojulis cerasina Snyder, 1904

Species of fish

Pseudojuloides cerasinus, the smalltail wrasse or the pencil wrasse, is a species of marine ray-finned fish, a wrasse from the family Labridae. It is found in the tropical Pacific Ocean and was previously considered to have a much wider distribution but the recognition of new species has reduced this wide range.

== Description ==
Pseudojuloides cerasinus in their male or terminal phase has a distinctive blue mid-lateral stripe which is situated immediately above a yellow stripe and the posterior portion of the caudal fin is black, edged with blue. In these males the body is an overall green colour and they have a single blue facial stripe. Some males show black spots on the membranes between the first two spines on the dorsal fin. Females of all species in the genus Pseudojuloides tend to be orange or reddish in colour. This is a small species which grows to a total length of 103 millimetres (4.1 in).

== Distribution ==
Pseudojuloides cerasinus is known only from the seas around Hawaii.

== Habitat and biology ==
Pseudojuloides cerasinus is frequently recorded in clear lagoon and near seaward reefs over coral rubble substrates, it is infrequently recorded over live coral and clumps of algae. It inhabits depths of around 3–61 metres (9.8–200.1 ft), although it is more common at depths in excess of 21 metres (69 ft).

== Taxonomy ==
Pseudojuloides cerasinus was formerly regarded as having a wide Indo-Pacific distribution but the taxon P. cerasinus sensu lato is now widely regarded as a species complex and P. cerasinus sensu stricto is now thought to be endemic to Hawaii. The three Indian Ocean species P. xanthomos from Mauritius, P. polackorum from South Africa to Madagascar and P. kaleidos of the Maldives to the Greater Sundas were the first to be recognised while P. splendens from the western Pacific Ocean and P. polynesica of Polynesia were recognised more recently.

Pseudojuloides cerasinus was originally described as Pseudojulis cerasina in 1904 by the American ichthyologist John Otterbein Snyder (1867-1943) with the type locality given as Honolulu. When Henry Weed Fowler described the genus Pseudojuloides he designated Pseudojulis cerasina as the type species of the new genus.
