= Long Green =

Long Green may refer to:

- Long Green, the summit of Cam Spout crags, near Slight Side in the English Lake District
- Long Green, Maryland, a small town in the United States
- "Long Green", a track by Donald Byrd on the 1955 album Byrd's Word
- Louisiana Long Green, a variety of eggplant
- Long green wrasse, a fish
