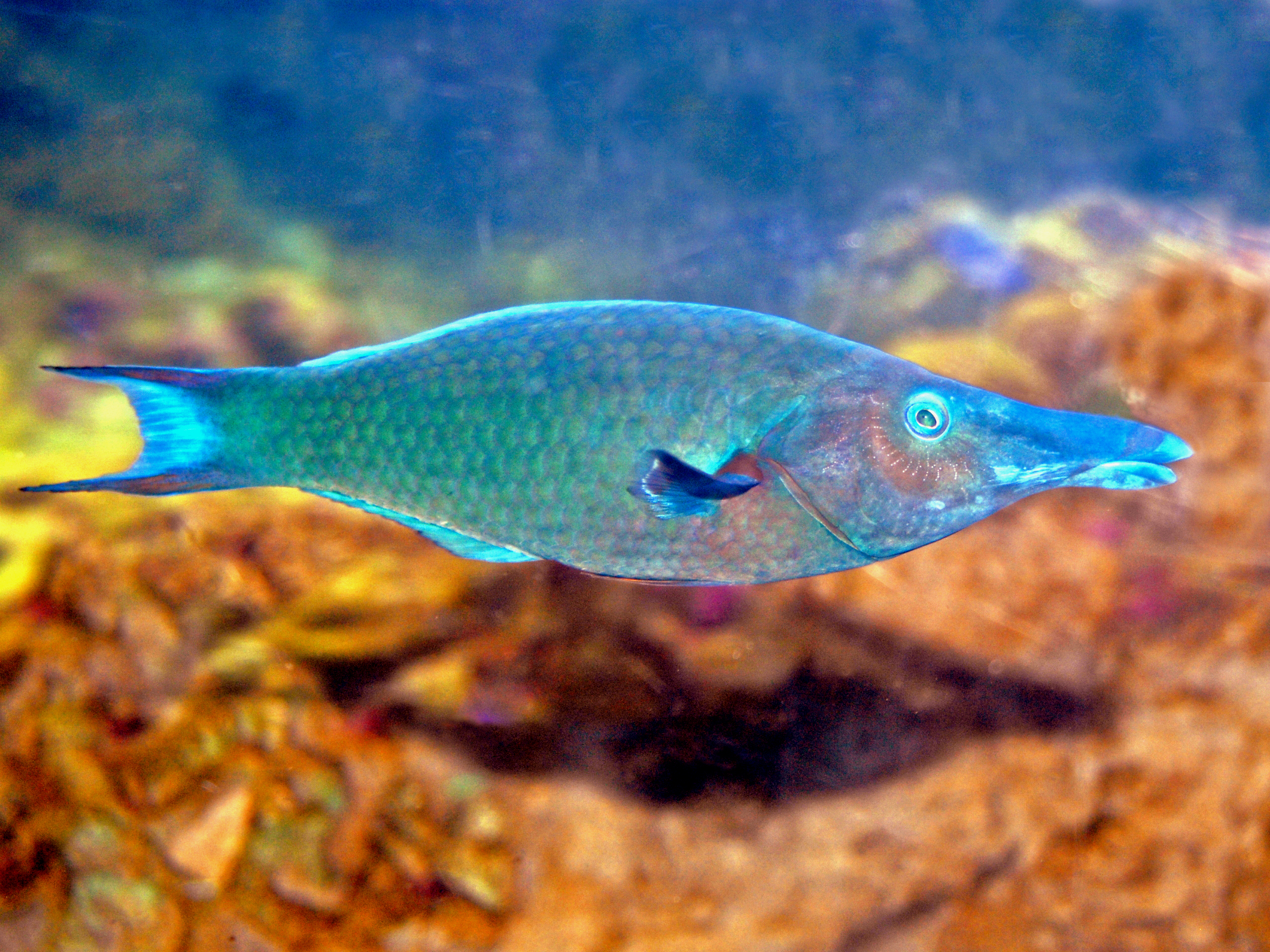
- Male
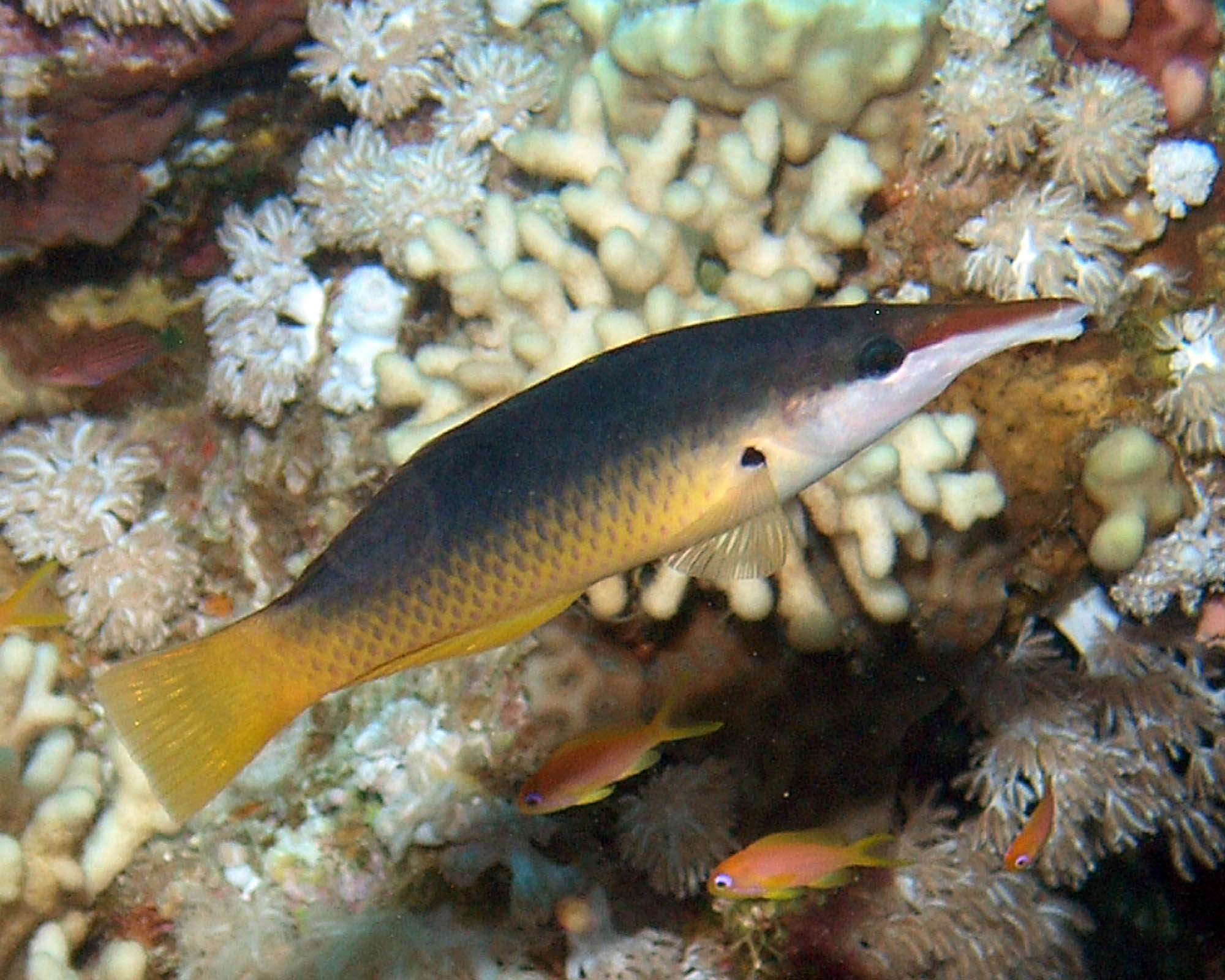
- Female

Conservation status
- Least Concern (IUCN 3.1)

Scientific classification
- Kingdom: Animalia
- Phylum: Chordata
- Class: Actinopterygii
- Order: Labriformes
- Family: Labridae
- Genus: Gomphosus
- Species: G. caeruleus

Binomial name
- Gomphosus caeruleus Lacépède, 1801

= Gomphosus caeruleus =

Species of bird wrasse

Gomphosus caeruleus, the green birdmouth wrasse, is a species of wrasse belonging to the family Labridae. It can be found in the aquarium trade.

== Distribution and habitat ==
This tropical species of wrasse is native to the Indian Ocean, from East Africa south to Natal, South Africa, and east to the Andaman Sea. It occurs on rocky reefs and coral, especially in coral-rich areas of lagoon and seaward reefs, between depths of 1–35 metres (3.3–114.8 ft).

== Description ==
Gomphosus caeruleus can reach a length of about 32 centimetres (13 in), with a distinctive 'beak-like' snout. It is sexually dimorphic; the males are dark blue overall, with a light blue edge running along their pectoral fins and lime green dorsal and anal fins. Females, on the other hand, have a dark strip through the eye and yellow anal and caudal fins. Juveniles are pale, with a dusky streak from their snout through the eye and onto the body. This species can be told apart from the similar birdnose wrasse Gomphosus varius by their different distributions and by the fact that in the later species, males have a bright green stripe along the flanks, females do not have a yellow tail and juveniles have a green back. There are 8 spines and 13 soft rays in the dorsal fin while the anal fin has 3 spines and 11 soft rays.

== Ecology ==
=== Diet ===
Gomphosus caeruleus feeds on small invertebrates.

=== Breeding ===
Very little is known about the reproductive habits of this species.

== Species description ==
Gomphosus caeruleus was formally described in 1801 by Bernard Germain de Lacépède in the third volume of his Histoire naturelle des poissons from types collected by Philibert Commerson (1727-1773). No type locality was given, but now it is known to be Mauritius.
