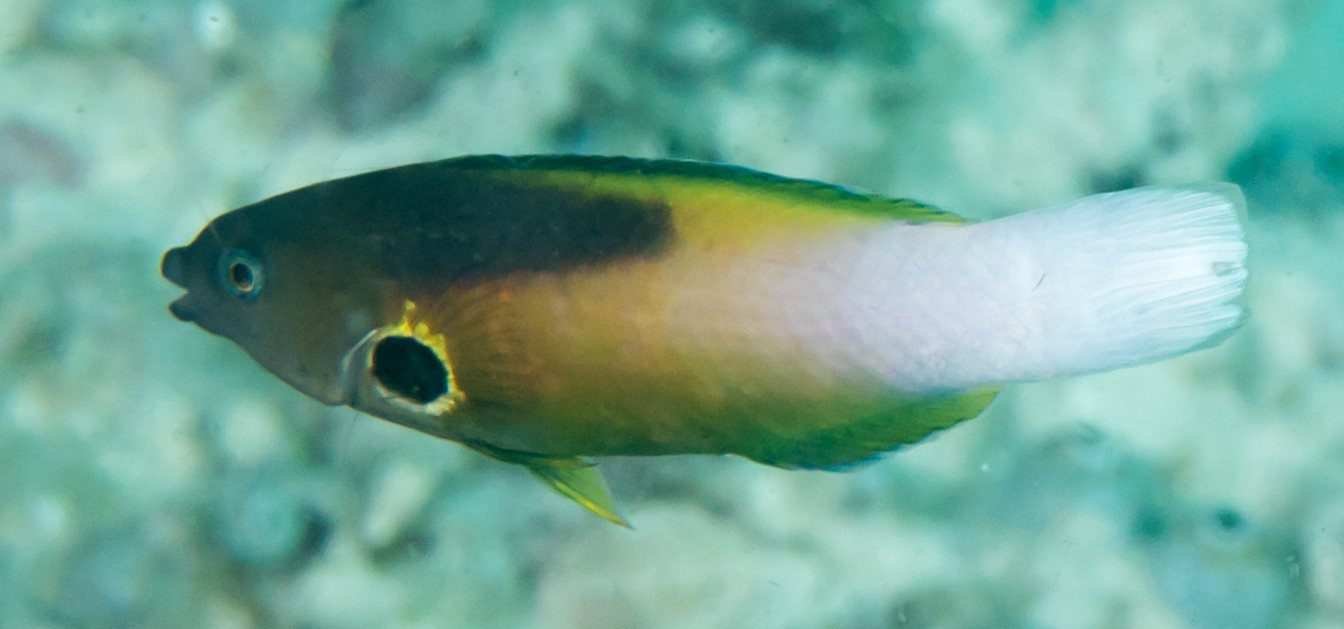
- Labropsis alleni

Scientific classification
- Kingdom: Animalia
- Phylum: Chordata
- Class: Actinopterygii
- Order: Labriformes
- Family: Labridae
- Subfamily: Julidinae
- Genus: Labropsis; P. J. Schmidt, 1931

Type species
- Labropsis manabei Schmidt, 1931

= Labropsis =

Genus of fishes

Labropsis is a genus of wrasses native to the Indian and Pacific Oceans.

== Species ==
The currently recognized species in this genus are:

- Labropsis alleni J. E. Randall, 1981 (Allen's tubelip)
- Labropsis australis J. E. Randall, 1981 (southern tubelip)
- Labropsis manabei P. J. Schmidt, 1931 (northern tubelip)
- Labropsis micronesica J. E. Randall, 1981 (Micronesian wrasse)
- Labropsis polynesica J. E. Randall, 1981
- Labropsis xanthonota J. E. Randall, 1981 (yellow-back tubelip)
