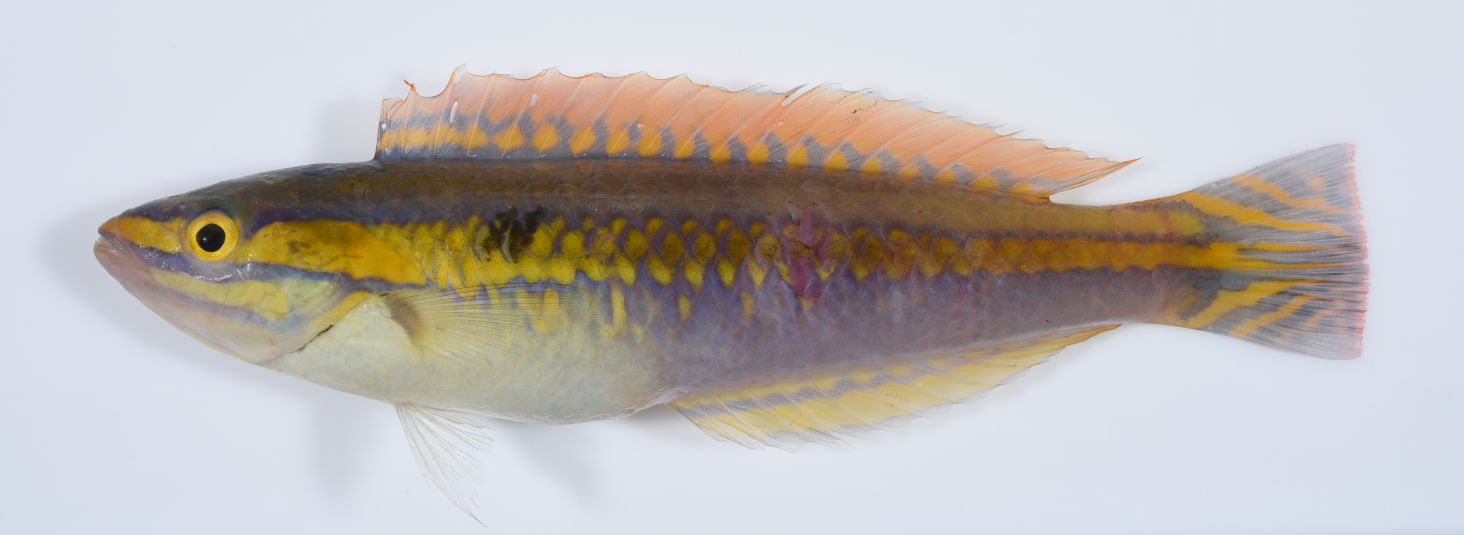
- L. cyanopleura

Scientific classification
- Domain: Eukaryota
- Kingdom: Animalia
- Phylum: Chordata
- Class: Actinopterygii
- Order: Labriformes
- Family: Labridae
- Tribe: Julidini
- Genus: Leptojulis; Bleeker, 1862

Type species
- Julis (Halichoeres) cyanopleura Bleeker, 1853

Synonyms
- Neojulis J. E. Randall, 1996

= Leptojulis =

Genus of fishes

Leptojulis is a genus of wrasses native to the Indian Ocean and the western Pacific Ocean.

== Species ==
The currently recognized species in this genus are:

- Leptojulis chrysotaenia J. E. Randall & Ferraris, 1981 (ochreband wrasse)
- Leptojulis cyanopleura (Bleeker, 1853) (shoulderspot wrasse)
- Leptojulis lambdastigma J. E. Randall & Ferraris, 1981
- Leptojulis polylepis J. E. Randall, 1996 (smallscale wrasse)
- Leptojulis urostigma J. E. Randall, 1996 (tailmark wrasse)
