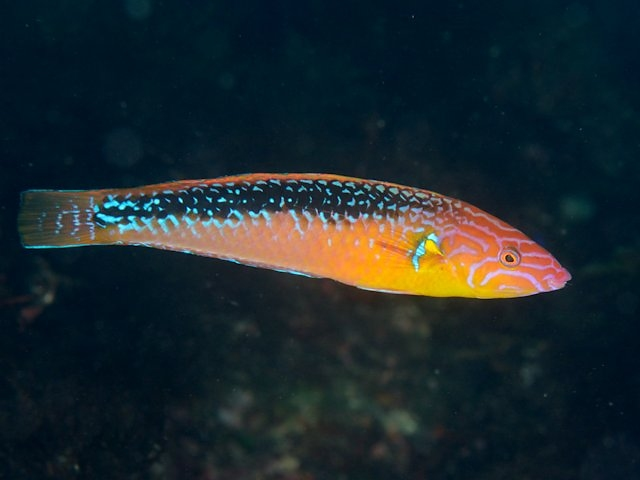
- Pseudojuloides elongatus

Scientific classification
- Kingdom: Animalia
- Phylum: Chordata
- Class: Actinopterygii
- Division: Teleostei
- Order: Labriformes
- Family: Labridae
- Subfamily: Julidinae
- Genus: Pseudojuloides; Fowler, 1949

Type species
- Pseudojulis cerasina Snyder, 1904

= Pseudojuloides =

Genus of fishes

Pseudojuloides is a genus of wrasses commonly referred to as pencil wrasses. They are native to the Indian and Pacific Oceans.

== Species ==
There are currently 16 recognized species in this genus:

Image	Species	Common name
	Pseudojuloides argyreogaster (Günther, 1867)	
	Pseudojuloides atavai J. E. Randall & H. A. Randall, 1981	Polynesian pencil wrasse
	Pseudojuloides cerasinus (Snyder, 1904)	Small-tail pencil wrasse
	Pseudojuloides edwardi Victor & J. E. Randall, 2014	Mombasa pencil wrasse
	Pseudojuloides elongatus Ayling & B. C. Russell, 1977	Long-green pencil wrasse
	Pseudojuloides erythrops J. E. Randall & H. A. Randall, 1981	Red-eye pencil wrasse
	Pseudojuloides kaleidos Kuiter & J. E. Randall, 1995	Kaleidos pencil wrasse
	Pseudojuloides labyrinthus Victor & J. M. B. Edward, 2016	Labyrinth pencil wrasse
	Pseudojuloides mesostigma J. E. Randall & H. A. Randall, 1981	Side-spot pencil wrasse
	Pseudojuloides polackorum Connell, Victor & J. E. Randall, 2015	
	Pseudojuloides polynesica Victor, 2017	Polynesian pencil wrasse
	Pseudojuloides pyrius J. E. Randall & H. A. Randall, 1981	
	Pseudojuloides severnsi Bellwood & J. E. Randall, 2000	Severns' pencil wrasse
	Pseudojuloides splendens Victor, 2017	Splendid pencil wrasse
	Pseudojuloides xanthomos J. E. Randall & H. A. Randall, 1981	
	Pseudojuloides zeus Victor & J. M. B. Edward, 2015	Zeus pencil wrasse
