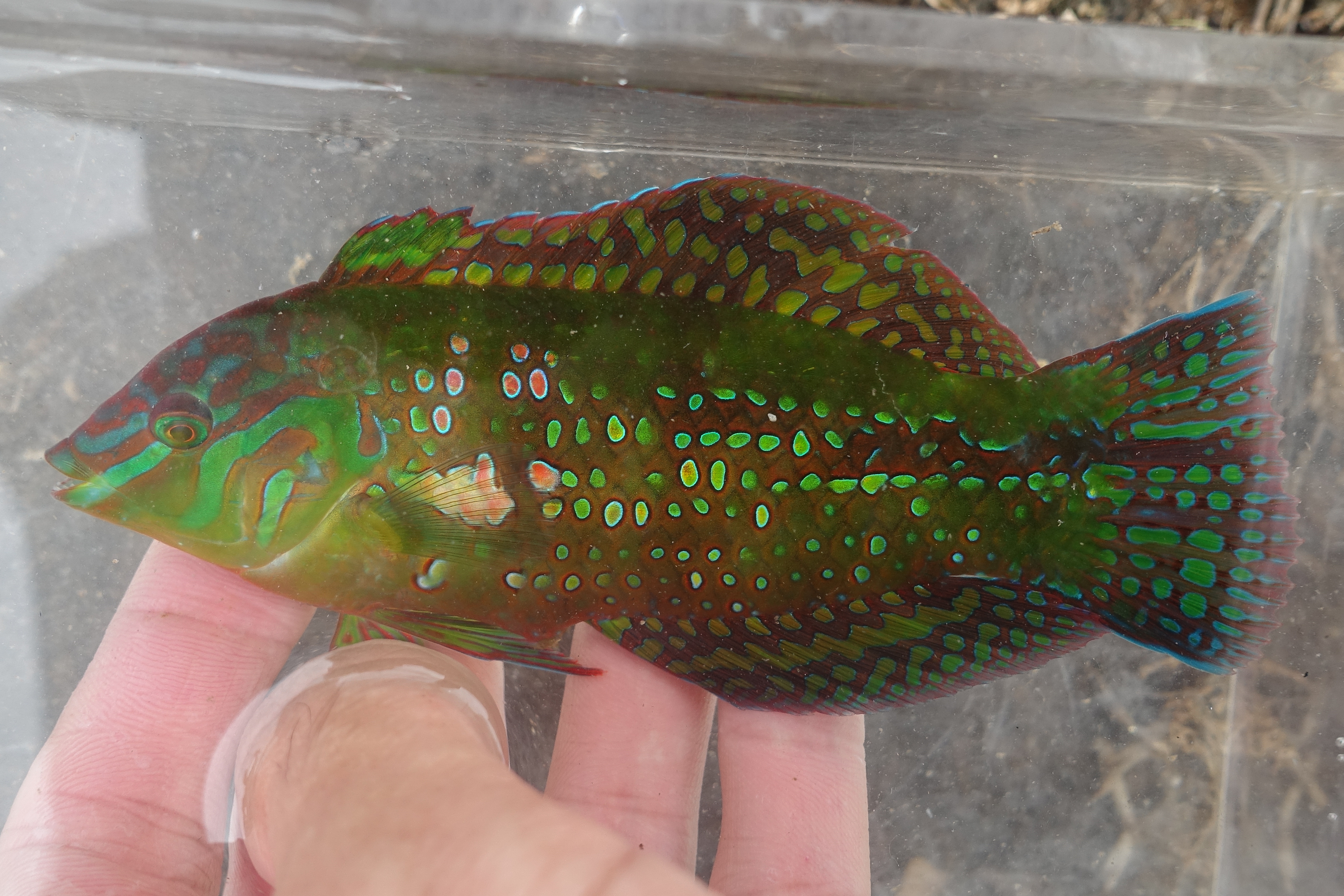

Conservation status
- Least Concern (IUCN 3.1)

Scientific classification
- Kingdom: Animalia
- Phylum: Chordata
- Class: Actinopterygii
- Order: Labriformes
- Family: Labridae
- Subfamily: Julidinae
- Genus: Xenojulis de Beaufort, 1939
- Species: X. margaritaceus

Binomial name
- Xenojulis margaritaceus (W. J. Macleay, 1883)

Synonyms
- Platyglossus margaritaceus W. J. Macleay, 1883; Halichoeres macleayi D. S. Jordan & Seale, 1906; Xenojulis montillai de Beaufort, 1939

= Finspot wrasse =

Species of fish

The finspot wrasse (Xenojulis margaritaceus), also known as the pinkspeckled wrasse, pearly rainbowfish or pearly weed wrasse, is a species of wrasse native to the western Pacific Ocean. It can be found on coral reefs at depths from 2 to 10 m (6.6 to 32.8 ft). This species grows to 10 centimetres (3.9 in) in standard length. It can also be found in the aquarium trade. This species is the only known member of its genus.
