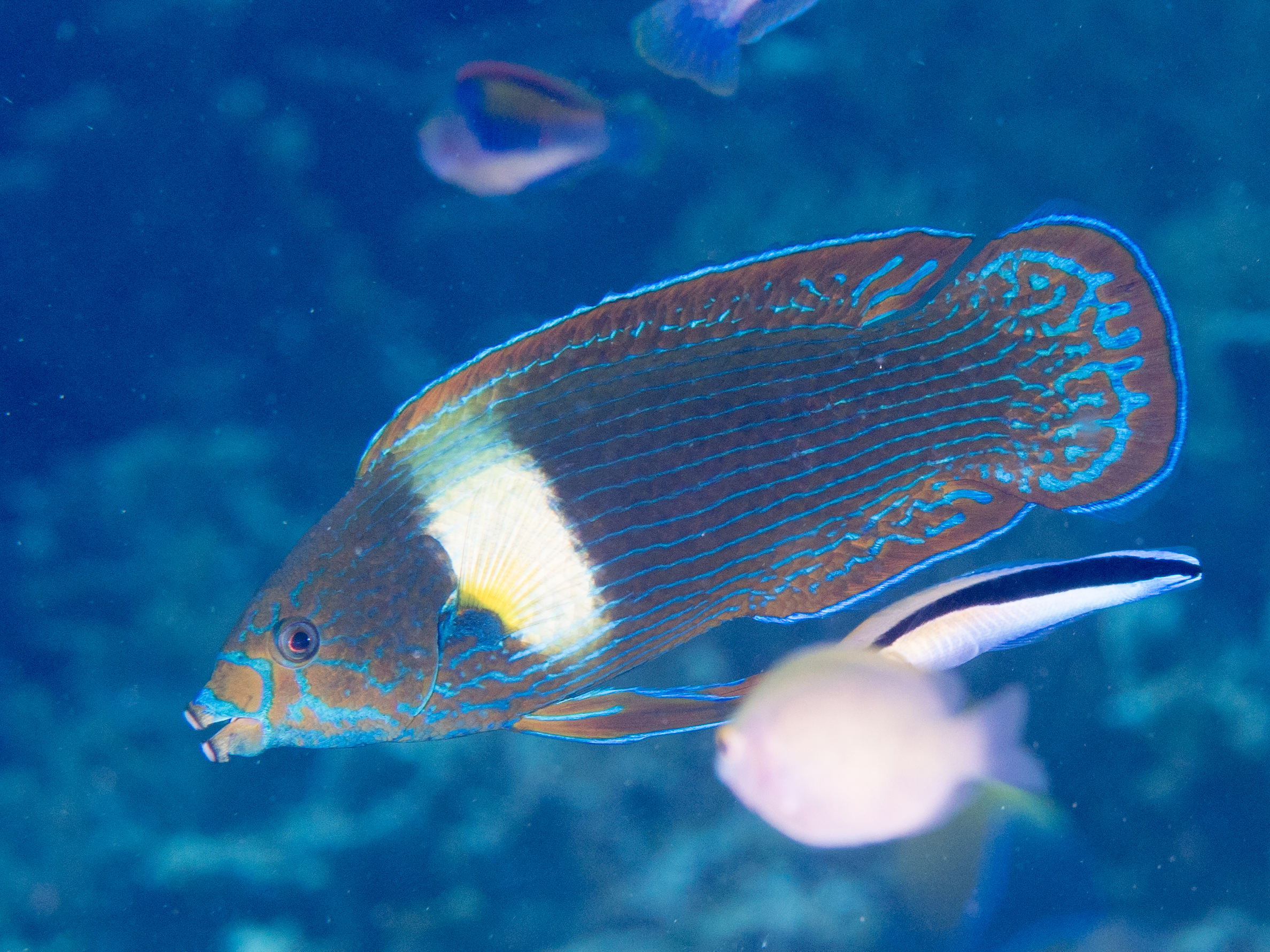
- Male
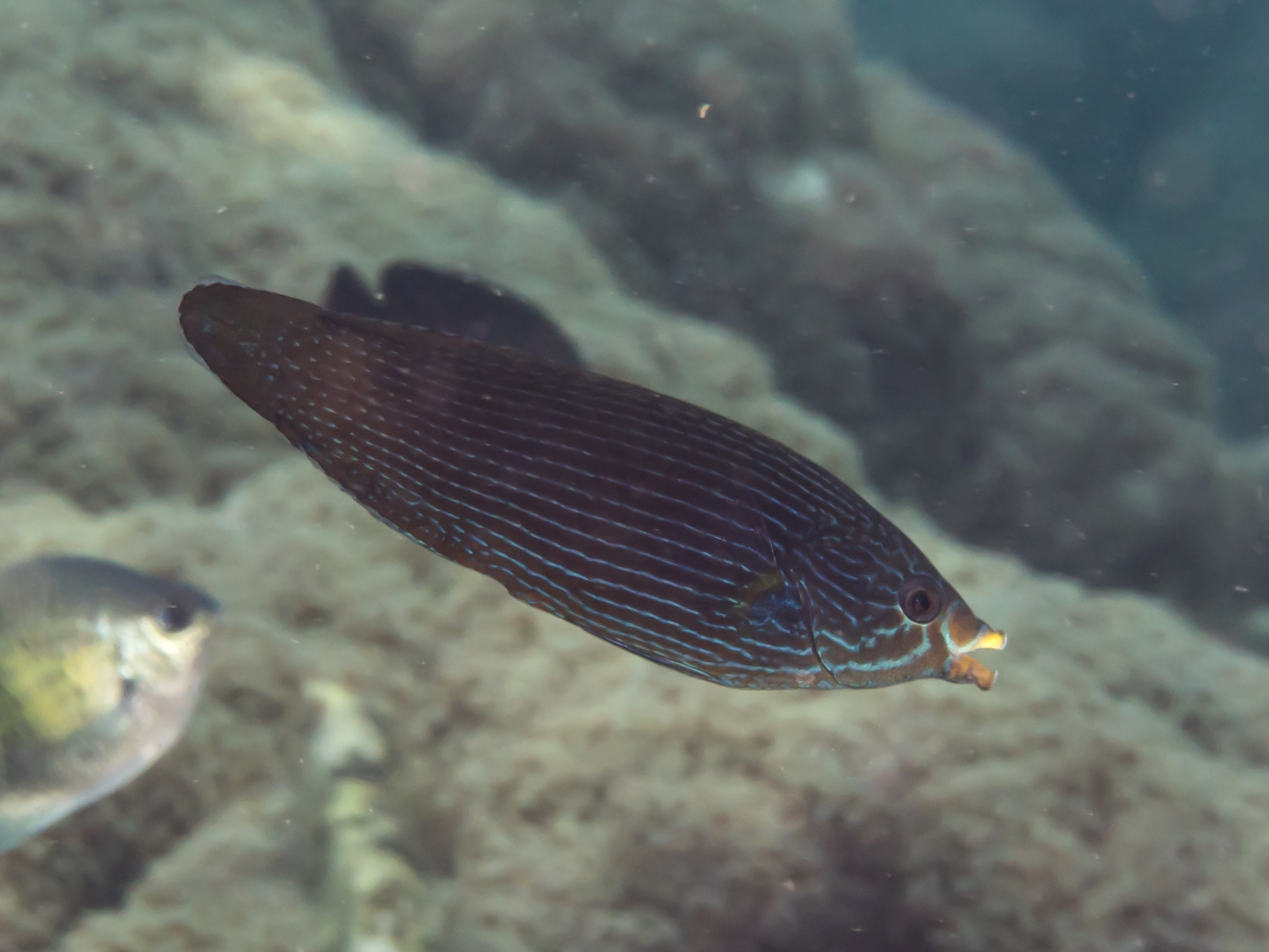
- Female

Conservation status
- Least Concern (IUCN 3.1)

Scientific classification
- Kingdom: Animalia
- Phylum: Chordata
- Class: Actinopterygii
- Division: Teleostei
- Order: Labriformes
- Family: Labridae
- Subfamily: Julidinae
- Genus: Labrichthys; Bleeker, 1854
- Species: L. unilineatus

Binomial name
- Labrichthys unilineatus (Guichenot, 1847)

Synonyms
- Genus synonymy: Thysanocheilus Kner, 1864; Species synonymy: Cossyphus unilineatus Guichenot, 1847; Labrichthys cyanotaenia Bleeker, 1854; Thysanocheilus ornatus Kner, 1865; Chaerojulis castaneus Kner & Steindachner, 1867

= Tubelip wrasse =

Species of fish

The tubelip wrasse (Labrichthys unilineatus) is a species of wrasse native to the Indian Ocean and the western Pacific Ocean. This species occurs in lagoons and on coral reefs at depths from 0 to 20 m (0 to 66 ft). This species grows to 17.5 cm (6.9 in) in total length. It is of minor importance to local commercial fisheries and can be found in the aquarium trade. This species is the only known member of its genus.

== Description ==
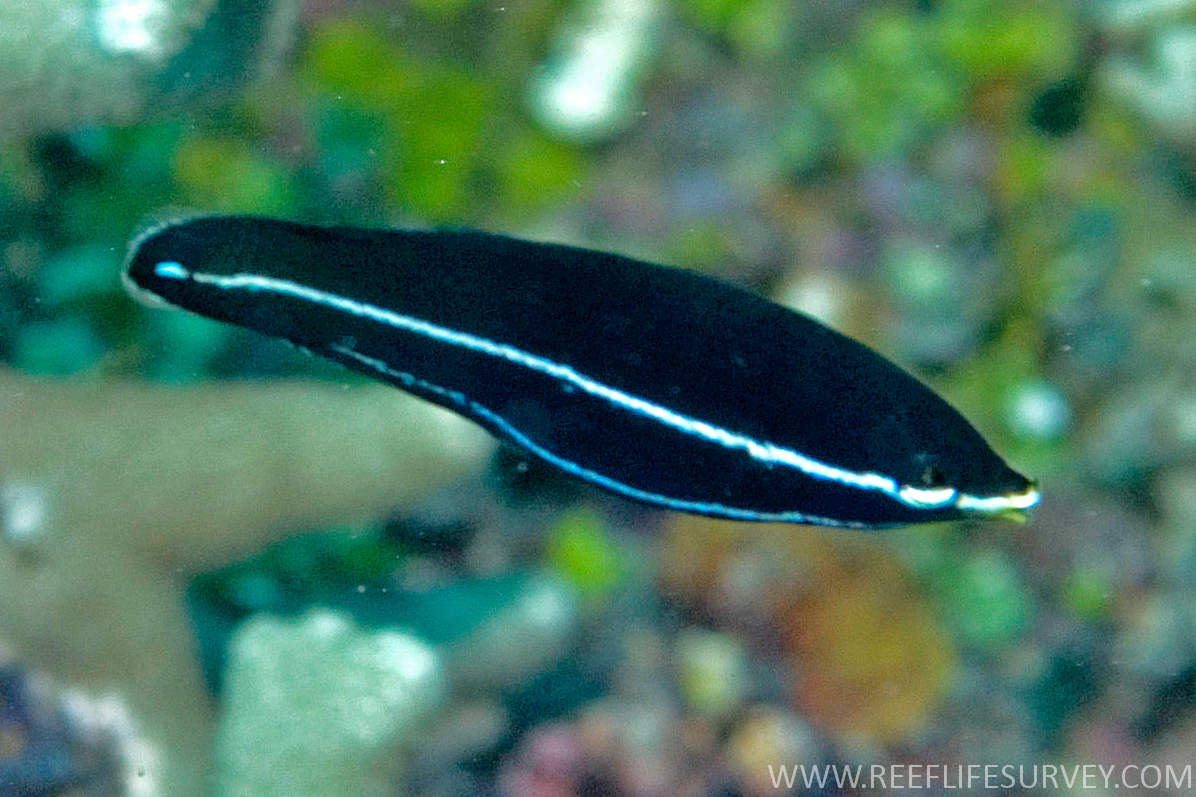
Juvenile

The tubelip wrasse juveniles are brown with 2 bluish white stripes along their body, as they increase in size the stripes disappear. The females are yellowish brown with faint stripes. The males have a more intense and bright colour than the females with a large yellow patch around the base of the pectoral fin. The yellow lips are thick and fleshy, creating a short tube when the mouth is closed. The head is covered in scales apart from a sheath over base of upper lip, the area in front of the eyes and the chin. The upper jaw has no teeth between the two forward pairs of canines and the large canine in the corner of each jaw. The dorsal fin has 9 spines and 11–12 soft rays and the anal fin has 3 spines and 10–11 soft rays. this species can attain a maximum fish measurement total length in males of 17.5 centimetres (6.9 in).

== Distribution ==
The tubelip wrasse has a wide Indo-Pacific distribution, it is found on the coast of East Africa in Tanzania and Mozambiique through the Indian Ocean, including the main islands into the Pacific Ocean as far as Micronesia and Samoa, north to the Ryukyus and Taiwan and south to the Great Barrier Reef and Lord Howe Island in Australia.

== Habitat and ecology ==
The tubelip wrasse inhabits shallow lagoon reefs and semi-protected seaward reefs where there is a high level of coral cover. It is found near branching corals, especially staghorn corals of the genus Acropora, the polyps of which are the main components of its diet.

== Species description and etymology ==
Labrichthys unilineatus was formally described in 1847 as Cossyphus unilineatus by the French naturalist Alphonse Guichenot with the type locality given as Guam. In 1854 the Dutch ichthyologist Pieter Bleeker placed C. unilineatus in the monotypic genus Labrichthys. The generic name is a combination of the Greek labrax, which can be taken to mean "voracious", and ichthys, which means "fish". The specific name unilineatus means "one lined" and refers to the lateral strip of the juveniles.

== Human usage ==
The tubelip wrasse is of minor interest to commercial fisheries and it occasionally turns up in the aquarium trade.
