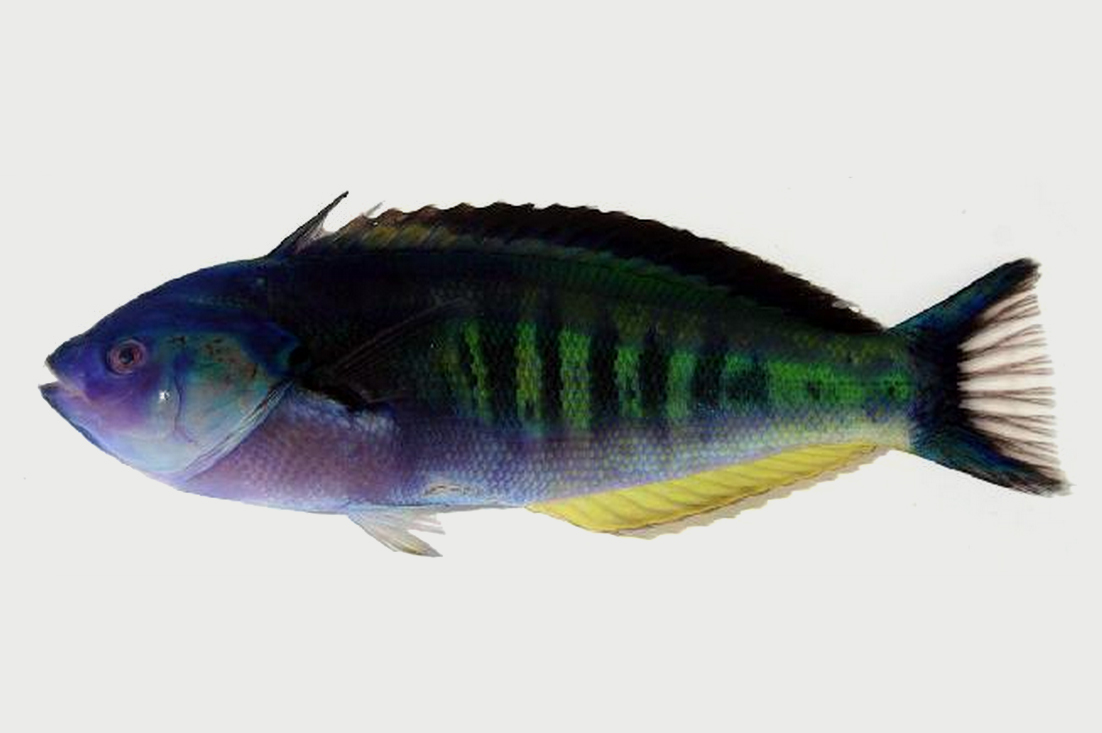
- A male, or terminal phase, of Pseudocoris occidentalis a very similar species to P. heteroptera from the Indian Ocean.

Conservation status
- Least Concern (IUCN 3.1)

Scientific classification
- Kingdom: Animalia
- Phylum: Chordata
- Class: Actinopterygii
- Order: Labriformes
- Family: Labridae
- Genus: Pseudocoris
- Species: P. heteroptera

Binomial name
- Pseudocoris heteroptera (Bleeker, 1857)

Synonyms
- Julis (Halichoeres) heteropterus Bleeker, 1857

= Pseudocoris heteroptera =

Species of fish

Pseudocoris heteroptera, the torpedo wrasse or zebra wrasse, is a species of marine ray-finned fish, a wrasse from the family Labridae. It is found in the western Pacific Ocean where it is associated with reefs.

== Description ==
Pseudocoris heteroptera, like the other species in the genus, is similar to the wrasses in the genus Coris but instead of being predators of benthic invertebrates these wrasses feed on zooplankton and show some adaptations for that mode of feeding. These include a smaller mouth, a shorter snout and having the eyes situated lower on the head. The males of this species are strikingly coloured deep turquoise with a wide black irregular stripe behind the eye, alternating light and dark bands on the body towards the caudal fin which has dark outer rays causing the tail to appear deeply forked. The anal fin is yellow with a thick black margin, whereas in the Indian Ocean taxon Pseudocoris occidentalis it is just yellow. The females are greenish to bluish-grey in colour and have a black spot above the base of the pectoral fin. The juveniles are mainly white in colour but are marked with a black stripe along their back and a wide black stripe along the flanks. They can quickly change colour as they move from swimming near the seabed into open water to feed when the striped pattern of the female fades to a plain grey rendering the fish difficult to discern. The variable banding of the males also changes and may be linked to their moods.

The maximum recorded total length for this species is 20 centimetres (7.9 in) but a more normal standard length is 15 centimetres (5.9 in). There are 9 spines and 12 rays in the dorsal fin and 3 spines and 12 rays in the anal fin.

== Distribution ==
Pseudocoris heteroptera is found in the Pacific Ocean. It is distributed from the Line Islands west to Indonesia, north as far as Taiwan and southern Japan, and in the south its distribution extends to the Great Barrier Reef.

== Habitat and biology ==
Pseudocoris heteroptera occurs over the outer crests of reefs, usually above substrates consisting of mixtures of sand, rubble and coral and which is periodically exposed to strong currents. They normally occur in small groups of females with a male nearby. This species feeds on zooplankton and is normally found well above the sea bed. The male and female form a pair to spawn. The defensive behaviour of this species is to stay away from the substrate and remain some distance from the perceived threat and not to dive into shelter.

== Human usage ==
Pseudocoris heteroptera is infrequently encountered in the aquarium trade.

== Taxonomy ==
Pseudocoris heteroptera was first formally described as Julis (Halichoeres) heteropterus in 1857 by the Dutch ichthyologist Pieter Bleeker (1819-1878) with a type locality given as Ambon in the Moluccas. When Bleeker created the genus Pseudocoris in 1862 he designated Julis (Halichoeres) heteropterus as its type species. P. heteroptera was considered to have an Indo Pacific distribution, extending as far west as the eastern coasts of Africa but the males, or terminal phase individuals, in the western Indian Ocean are different in colouration and pattern to the terminal phase of their Pacific counterparts and these Indian Ocean populations have been split from P. heteroptera as Pseudocoris occidentalis.
