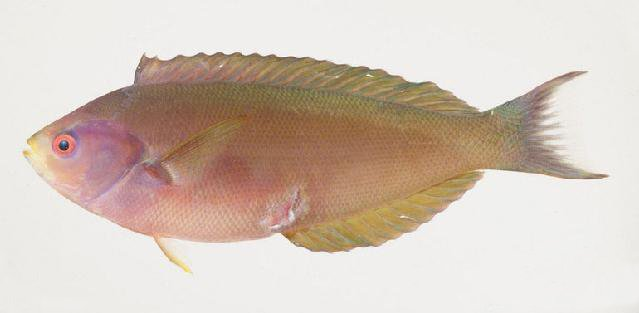
- Pseudocoris aurantiofasciata

Scientific classification
- Kingdom: Animalia
- Phylum: Chordata
- Class: Actinopterygii
- Order: Labriformes
- Family: Labridae
- Subfamily: Julidinae
- Genus: Pseudocoris; Bleeker, 1862

Type species
- Julis (Halichoeres) heteropterus Bleeker, 1857

= Pseudocoris =

Genus of fishes

Pseudocoris is a genus of wrasses native to the eastern Indian Ocean and the western Pacific Ocean.

== Species ==
There are currently 9 species recognized in this genus:

- Pseudocoris aequalis J. E. Randall & F. M. Walsh, 2008
- Pseudocoris aurantiofasciata Fourmanoir, 1971 (Rust-banded wrasse)
- Pseudocoris bleekeri (Hubrecht, 1876) (Philippines wrasse)
- Pseudocoris hemichrysos J. E. Randall, Connell & Victor, 2015
- Pseudocoris heteroptera (Bleeker, 1857) (Torpedo wrasse)
- Pseudocoris occidentalis J. E. Randall, Connell & Victor, 2015
- Pseudocoris ocellata J. P. Chen & K. T. Shao, 1995
- Pseudocoris petila G. R. Allen & Erdmann, 2012
- Pseudocoris yamashiroi (P. Y. Schmidt, 1931) (Redspot wrasse)
