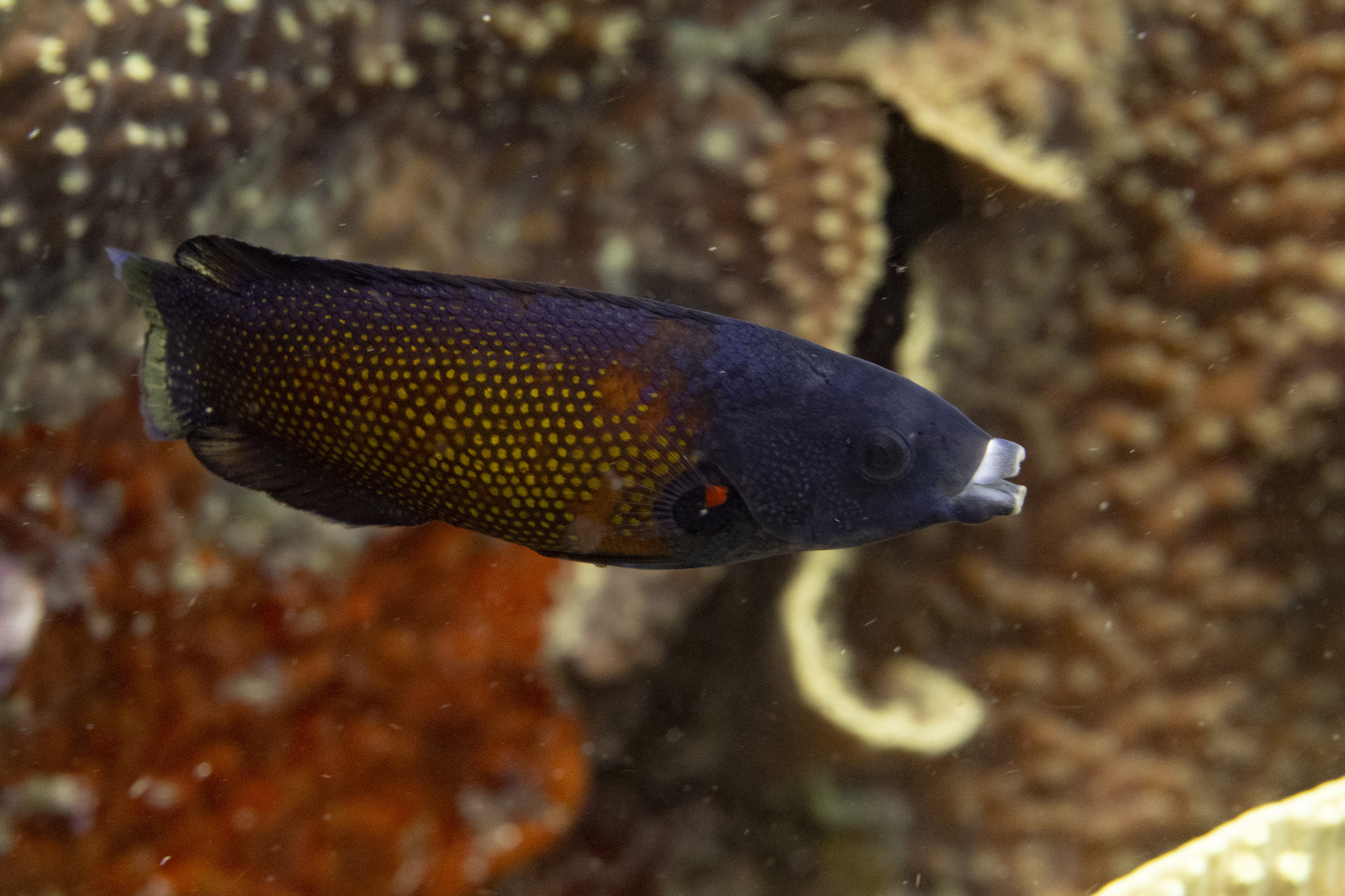

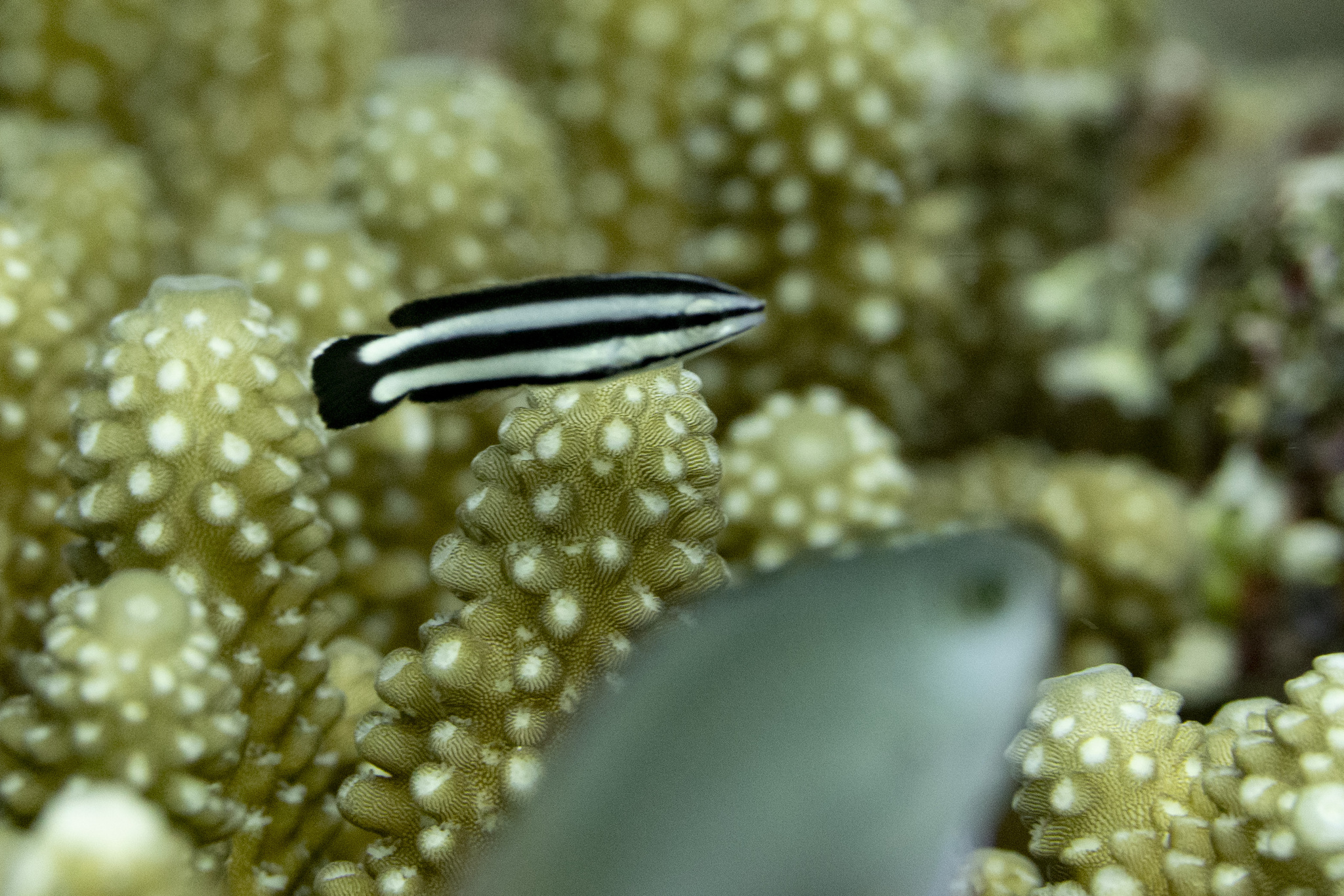

Conservation status
- Least Concern (IUCN 3.1)

Scientific classification
- Kingdom: Animalia
- Phylum: Chordata
- Class: Actinopterygii
- Order: Labriformes
- Family: Labridae
- Genus: Labropsis
- Species: L. australis

Binomial name
- Labropsis australis Randall, 1981

= Labropsis australis =

Species of fish

Labropsis australis, the southern tubelip, is a species of marine ray-finned fish from the family Labridae, the wrasses. This species occurs in the south western Pacific Ocean from the Solomon Islands, Samoa, Vanuatu, Fiji, the Loyalty Islands, Tonga and the Great Barrier Reef. It is found in areas with heavy growth of corals including reefs, lagoons, passages and slopes. The adults feed on polyps in the coral while the juveniles feed on ectoparasites, and maybe mucus, on other reef fishes.
