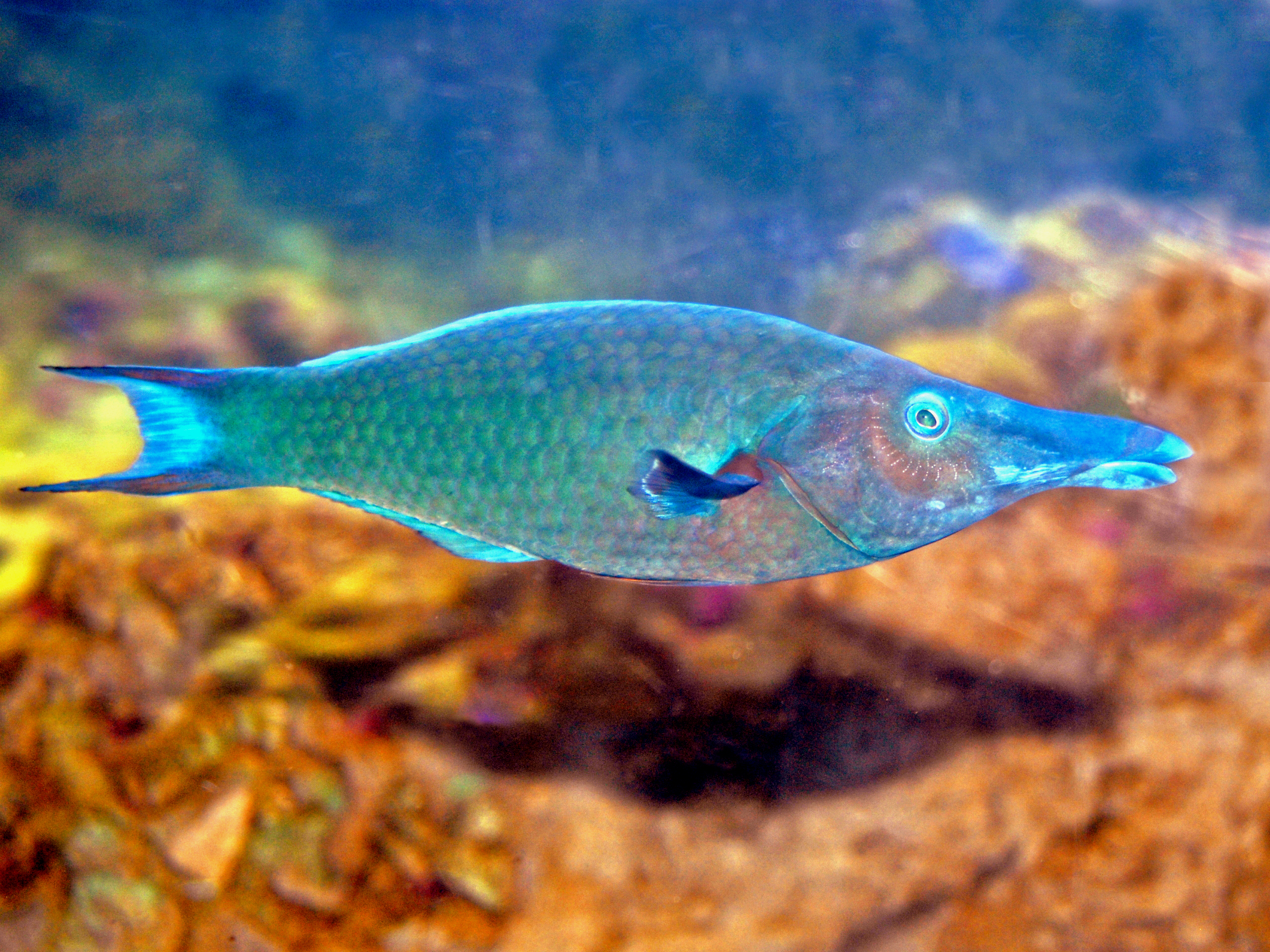
- Green birdmouth wrasse (G. caeruleus)
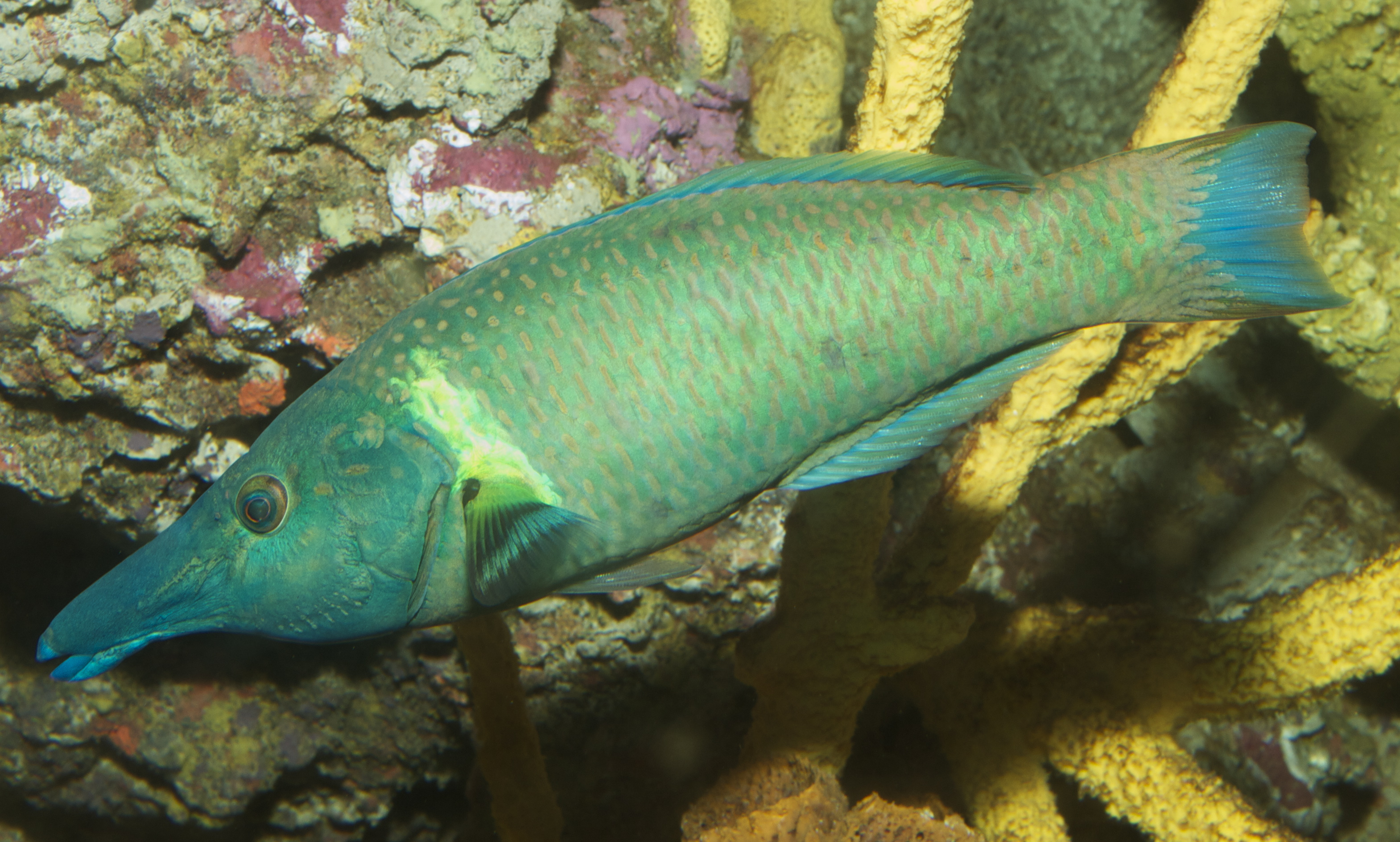
- Bird wrasse (G. varius)

Scientific classification
- Kingdom: Animalia
- Phylum: Chordata
- Class: Actinopterygii
- Order: Labriformes
- Family: Labridae
- Subfamily: Julidinae
- Genus: Gomphosus; Lacépède, 1801

Type species
- Gomphosus caeruleus Lacépède, 1801

Synonyms
- Acarauna Sevastianoff, 1802; Elops Bonaparte, 1831

= Gomphosus =

Genus of bird wrasses from the Indo-Pacific

Gomphosus is a small genus of wrasses native to the Indian and Pacific Oceans.

== Taxonomy ==
Although classified as its own genus, the genus Gomphosus is nested within the genus Thalassoma, rendering the latter paraphyletic. This close affinity is reflected by the fact that in the wild, Gomphosus will sometimes create hybrid offspring with Thalassoma species. In 2025, it was proposed that all species in Thalassoma should be transferred to Gomphosus.

A potential third species of bird wrasse, Gomphosus klunzingeri Klausewitz 1962, has variably been considered its own species, a subspecies of G. caeruleus, or a synonym of the former. It is endemic to the Red Sea.

== Species ==
The currently recognized species in this genus are:

- Gomphosus caeruleus Lacépède, 1801 (green birdmouth wrasse)
- Gomphosus varius Lacépède, 1801 (bird wrasse)
