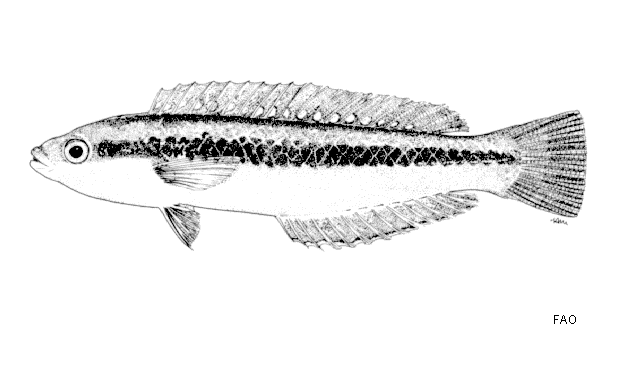

Conservation status
- Least Concern (IUCN 3.1)

Scientific classification
- Kingdom: Animalia
- Phylum: Chordata
- Class: Actinopterygii
- Order: Labriformes
- Family: Labridae
- Genus: Leptojulis
- Species: L. cyanopleura

Binomial name
- Leptojulis cyanopleura (Bleeker, 1853)

Synonyms
- Julis cyanopleura Bleeker, 1853; Halichoeres cyanopleura (Bleeker, 1853); Julis pyrrhogrammatoides Bleeker, 1853; Leptojulis pyrrhogrammatoides (Bleeker, 1853)

= Leptojulis cyanopleura =

Species of fish

Leptojulis cyanopleura, the shoulder-spot wrasse, is a species of marine ray-finned fish from the family Labridae, the wrasses. It is found in the Indo-West Pacific from the Gulf of Oman, Socotra and the Persian Gulf, the Maldives, Sri Lanka, southwest India, Malaysia and Singapore and through the Malay Archipelago and the Philippines to the Solomon Islands south to Ningaloo Reef in Western Australia and New South Wales in Australia. This species forms harems, consisting of a single male and a number of females, in areas with rubble and weed where the water is turbid and rich in plankton, on which this species feeds.
