= Pseudojuloides kaleidos =

Conservation status
- Least Concern (IUCN 3.1)

Scientific classification
- Kingdom: Animalia
- Phylum: Chordata
- Class: Actinopterygii
- Order: Labriformes
- Family: Labridae
- Genus: Pseudojuloides
- Species: P. kaleidos

Binomial name
- Pseudojuloides kaleidos Kuiter & Randall, 1995

Species of fish

Pseudojuloides kaleidos, the Kaleidos wrasse or blue-nose wrasse, is a species of saltwater fish. It is an uncommon fish with a distribution in the Indian Ocean including off the Maldives east to Indonesia.

It lives on reef slopes and flats at depths of 20–35 m (66–115 ft). The Kaleidos wrasse reaches 10 cm (3.9 in) in length. Both sexes begin a brownish pink color with a pale yellow tip on the snout, with males maturing to bright colors within about a week.
