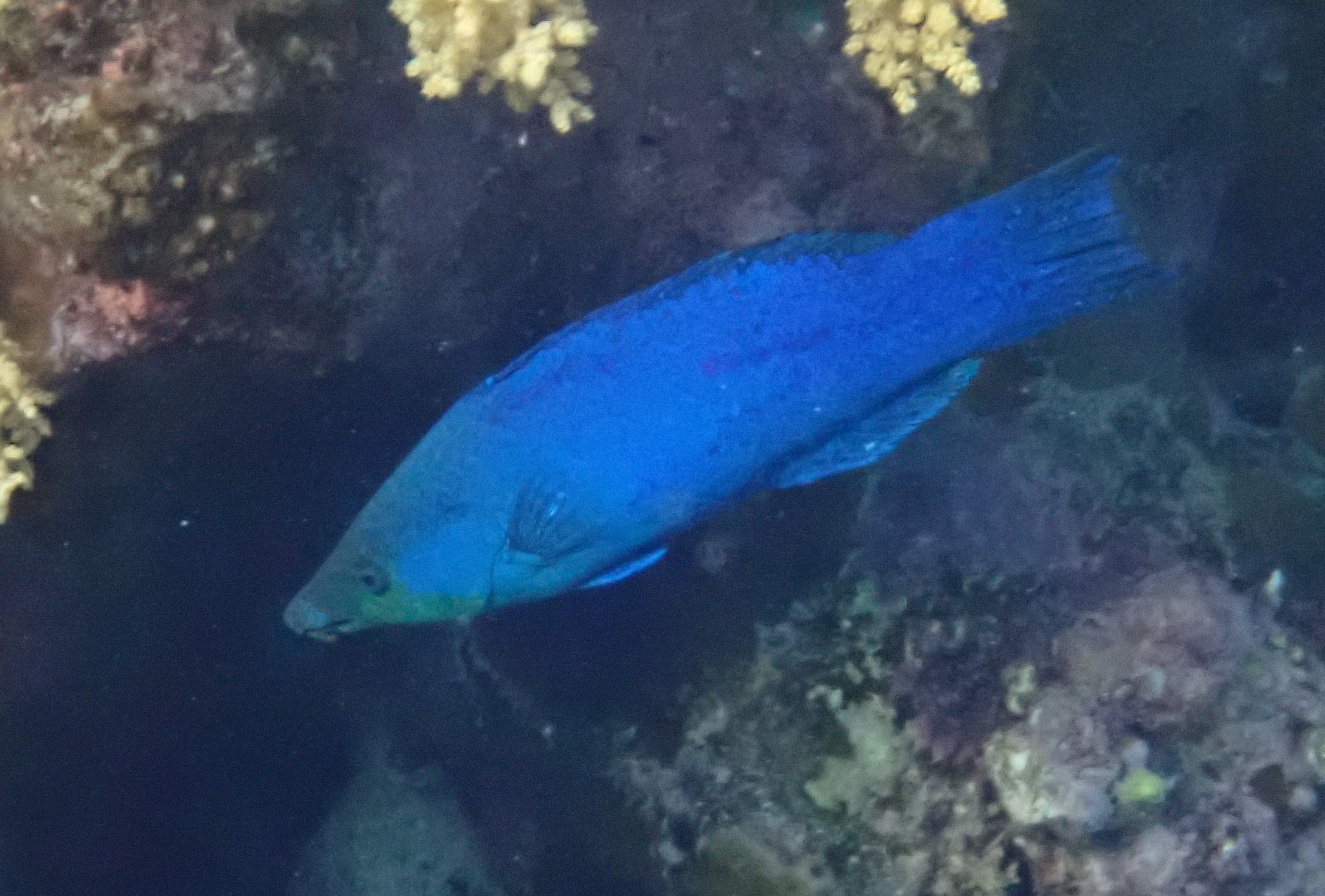

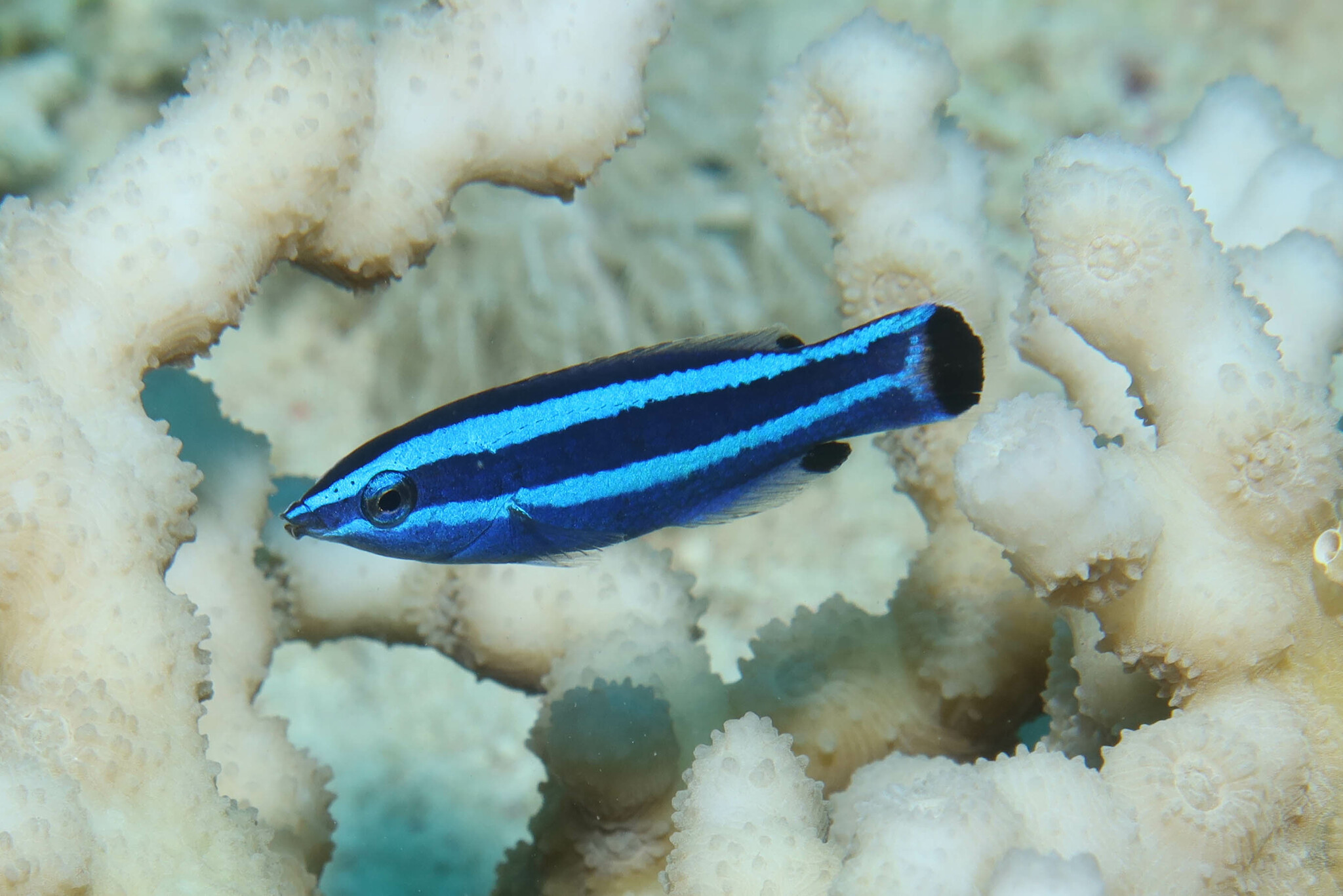
- Adult (top) and juvenile (bottom)

Conservation status
- Data Deficient (IUCN 3.1)

Scientific classification
- Kingdom: Animalia
- Phylum: Chordata
- Class: Actinopterygii
- Division: Teleostei
- Order: Labriformes
- Family: Labridae
- Genus: Larabicus; Randall & Springer, 1973
- Species: L. quadrilineatus

Binomial name
- Larabicus quadrilineatus (Rüppell, 1835)

Synonyms
- Labrus quadrilineatus Rüppell, 1835

= Four-line wrasse =

Species of fish

The four-line wrasse, Larabicus quadrilineatus, is a species of wrasse native to the Red Sea and the Gulf of Aden. It can be found on coral reefs at depths from the surface to 15 m (49 ft). Juveniles are cleaner fish, while the adults feed on coral polyps. This species grows to 11.5 cm (4.5 in) in total length. This species is the only known member of its genus.
