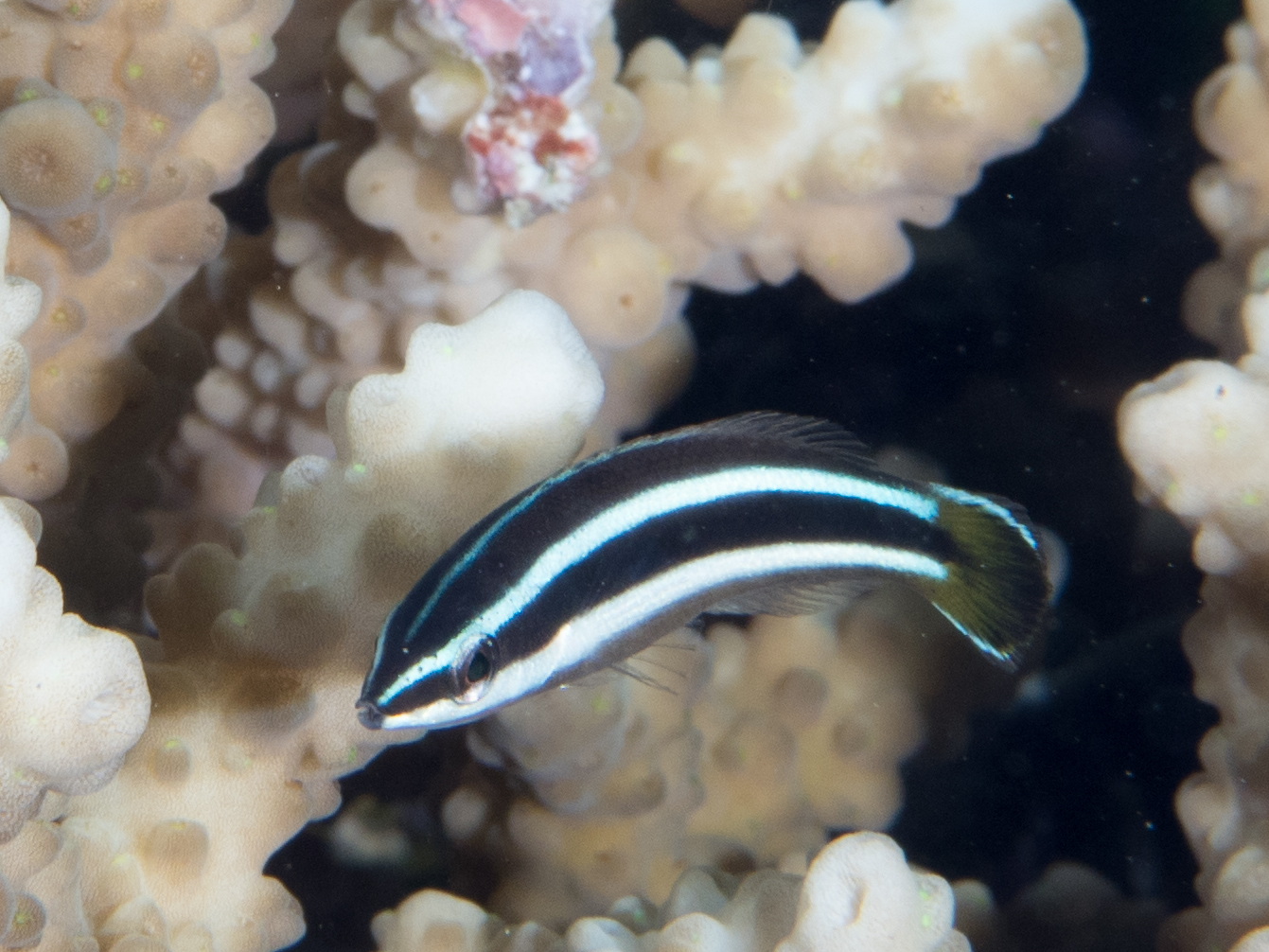

Conservation status
- Least Concern (IUCN 3.1)

Scientific classification
- Kingdom: Animalia
- Phylum: Chordata
- Class: Actinopterygii
- Division: Teleostei
- Order: Labriformes
- Family: Labridae
- Genus: Diproctacanthus; Bleeker, 1862
- Species: D. xanthurus

Binomial name
- Diproctacanthus xanthurus (Bleeker, 1856)

Synonyms
- Labroides xanthurus Bleeker, 1856

= Yellowtail tubelip =

Species of fish

The yellowtail tubelip (Diproctacanthus xanthurus) is a species of wrasse native to the coral reefs of the western central Pacific Ocean (including Palau, Indonesia, Great barrier reef, the Philippines and New Guinea) at depths from 3 to 25 m (9.8 to 82.0 ft). The juveniles act as cleaner fish, while the adults primarily prey on coral polyps. This species is the only known member of its genus, and it can be found in the aquarium trade.

== Description ==
This species grows to a total length of 10 cm (3.9 in). It has a clear white and dark brown striped body with a total of 9 dorsal fins, 9 to 10 dorsal soft rays, 2 anal spines, 9–11 anal soft rays and 25 vertebrae.
