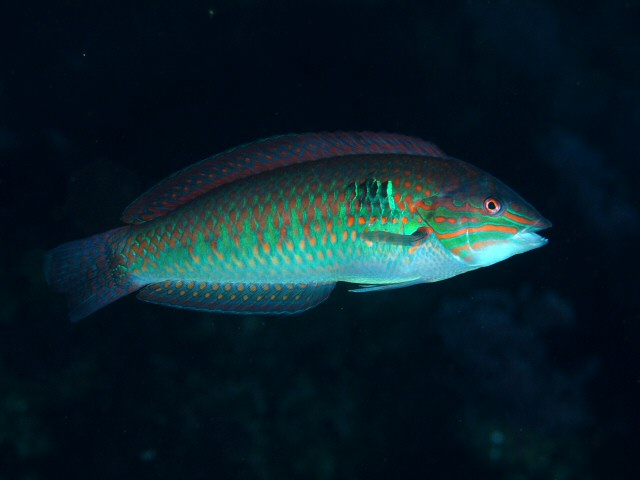
- Terminal phase
- Initial phase

Conservation status
- Least Concern (IUCN 3.1)

Scientific classification
- Kingdom: Animalia
- Phylum: Chordata
- Class: Actinopterygii
- Division: Teleostei
- Order: Labriformes
- Family: Labridae
- Genus: Parajulis; Bleeker, 1865
- Species: P. poecilopterus

Binomial name
- Parajulis poecilopterus (Temminck & Schlegel, 1845)

Synonyms
- Julis poecilopterus Temminck & Schlegel, 1845; Julis pyrrhogramma Temminck & Schlegel, 1845; Julis thirsites J. Richardson, 1846; Julis poecilopterus J. Richardson, 1846; Halichoeres poecilopterus (J. Richardson, 1846)

= Parajulis =

Genus of fishes

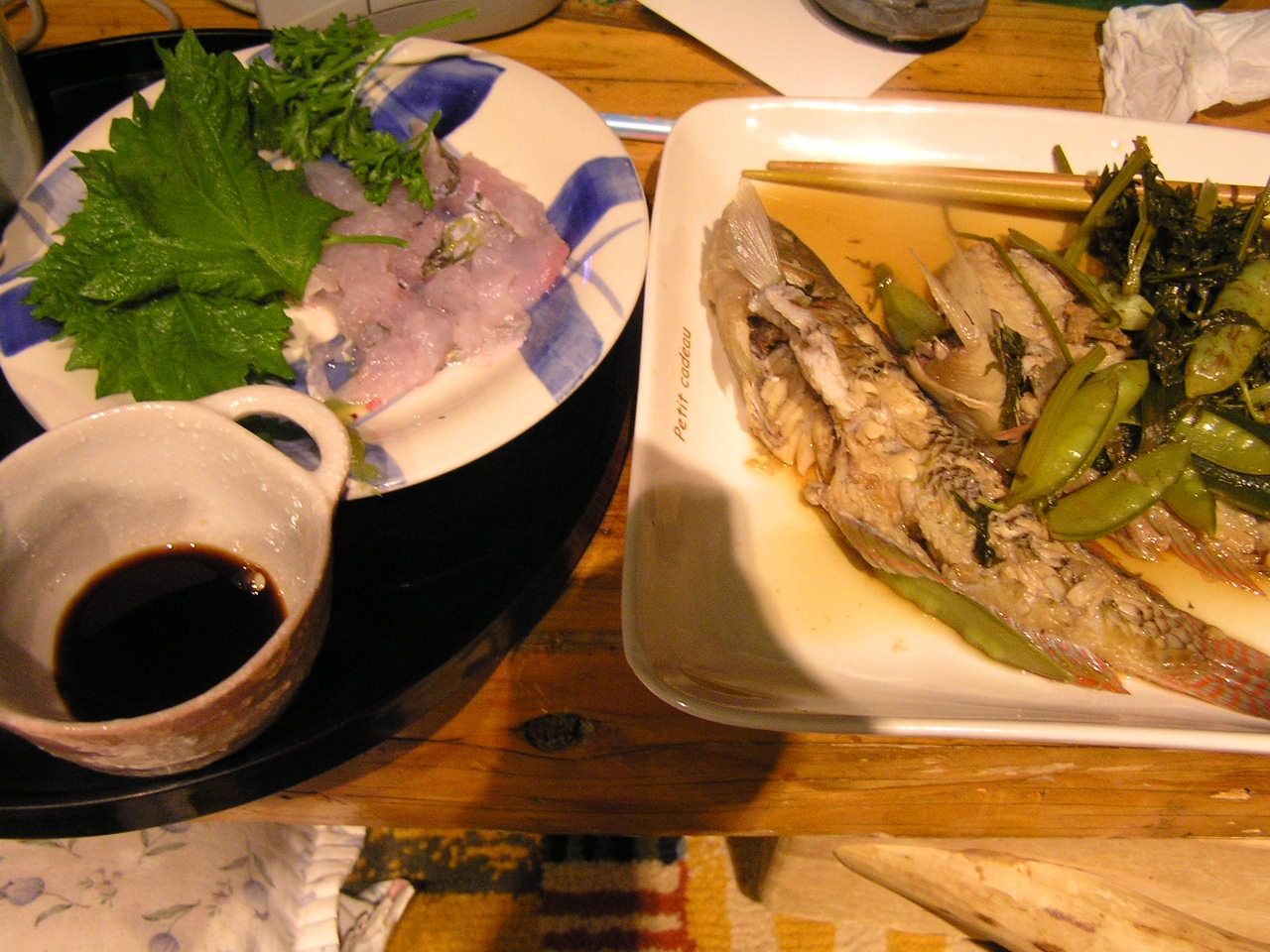
cooked wrasse （Sashimi and nitsuke）

Parajulis poecilopterus is a species of wrasse native to the northwestern Pacific Ocean along the coast of Asia. It is an inshore species, being found in areas with a substrate of pebbles. This species grows to 34 cm (13 in) in total length. This species is commercially important and is also farmed. It is popular as a game fish and can also be found in the aquarium trade. This species is the only known member of its genus and was originally formally described by Coenraad Jacob Temminck and Hermann Schlegel as Julis poecilepterus in 1845 with the type locality given as the Bay of Sinabara in Japan.

== See also ==
- Ballan wrasse
