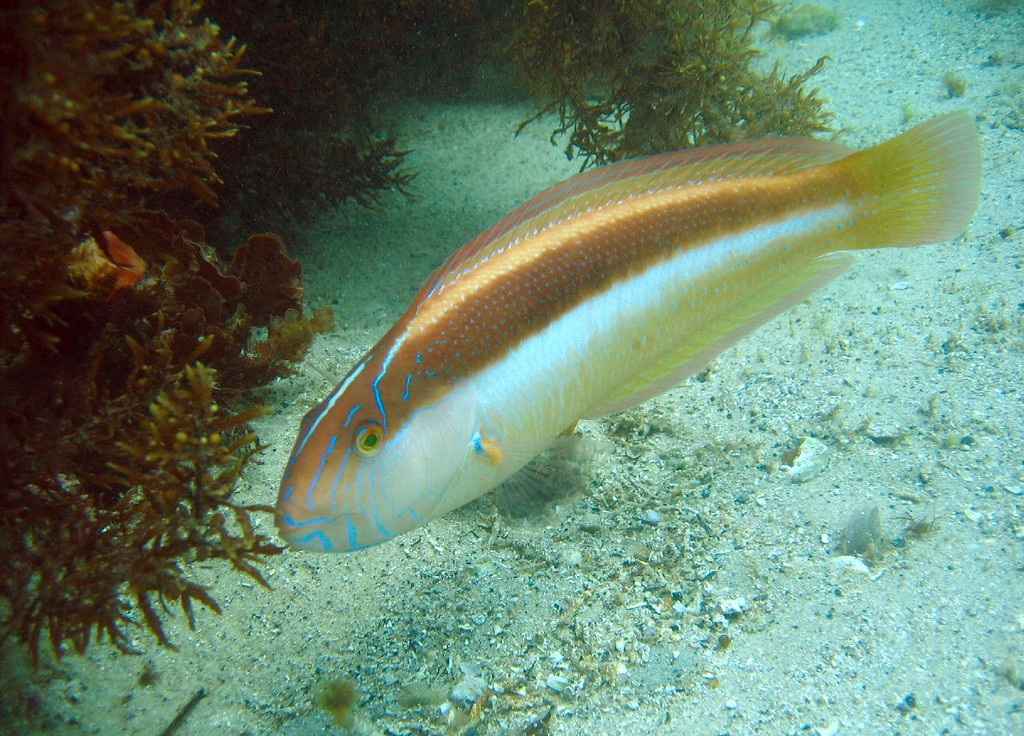

Conservation status
- Least Concern (IUCN 3.1)

Scientific classification
- Kingdom: Animalia
- Phylum: Chordata
- Class: Actinopterygii
- Order: Labriformes
- Family: Labridae
- Genus: Ophthalmolepis; Bleeker, 1862
- Species: O. lineolata

Binomial name
- Ophthalmolepis lineolata (Valenciennes, 1839)

Synonyms
- Julis lineolatus Valenciennes, 1839

= Ophthalmolepis =

Genus of fishes

Ophthalmolepis lineolata, the southern Maori wrasse, is a species of wrasse endemic to the Indian Ocean coastal waters of Australia. This species has been found at a minimum depth of 60 m (200 ft). This species grows to 40 cm (16 in) in total length. This species is the only known member of its genus.
