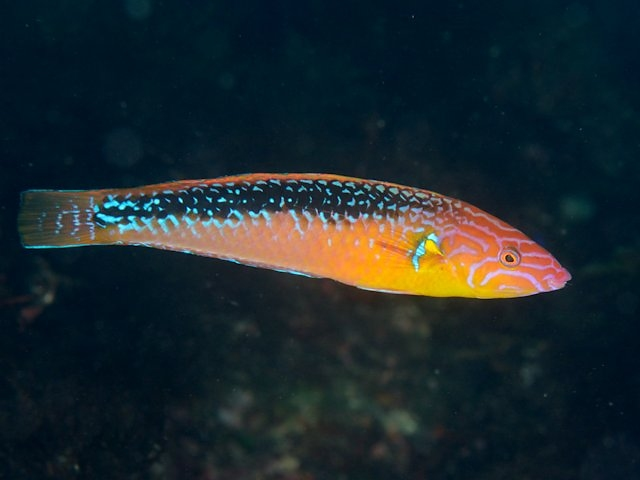

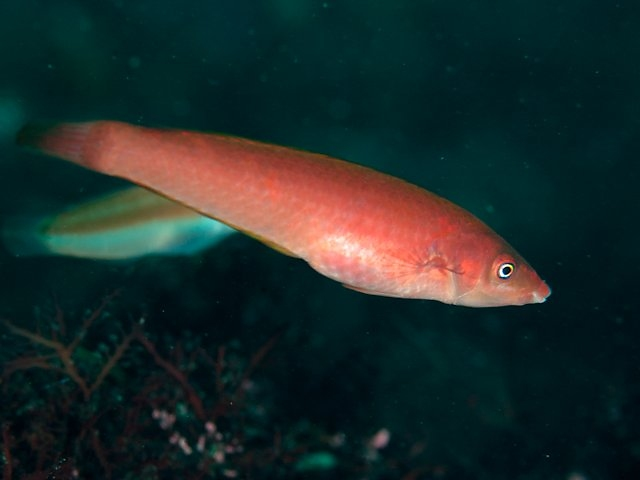
- Terminal phase (top), initial phase (bottom)

Conservation status
- Data Deficient (IUCN 3.1)

Scientific classification
- Kingdom: Animalia
- Phylum: Chordata
- Class: Actinopterygii
- Order: Labriformes
- Family: Labridae
- Genus: Pseudojuloides
- Species: P. elongatus

Binomial name
- Pseudojuloides elongatus Ayling & B. C. Russell, 1977

= Long green wrasse =

Species of fish

The long green wrasse, Pseudojuloides elongatus, is a species of wrasse native to coastal waters from Australia to New Zealand and Norfolk Island (records from the Izu Islands, Japan are considered an undescribed species). This species occurs to depths around 25 m (82 ft) in weedy areas on reefs. It can reach 12.6 cm (5.0 in) in standard length. This species is also found the aquarium trade.
