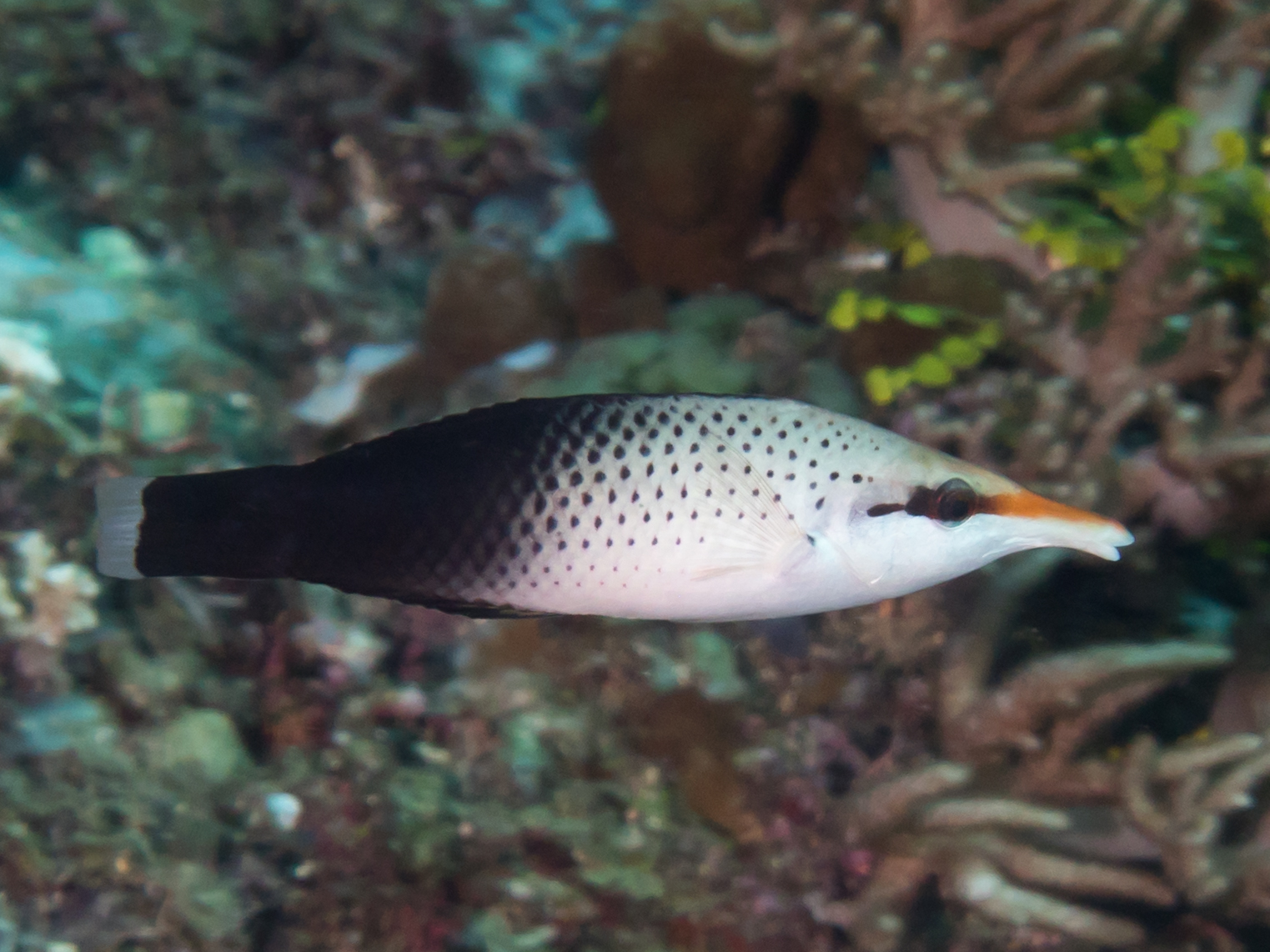
- Female
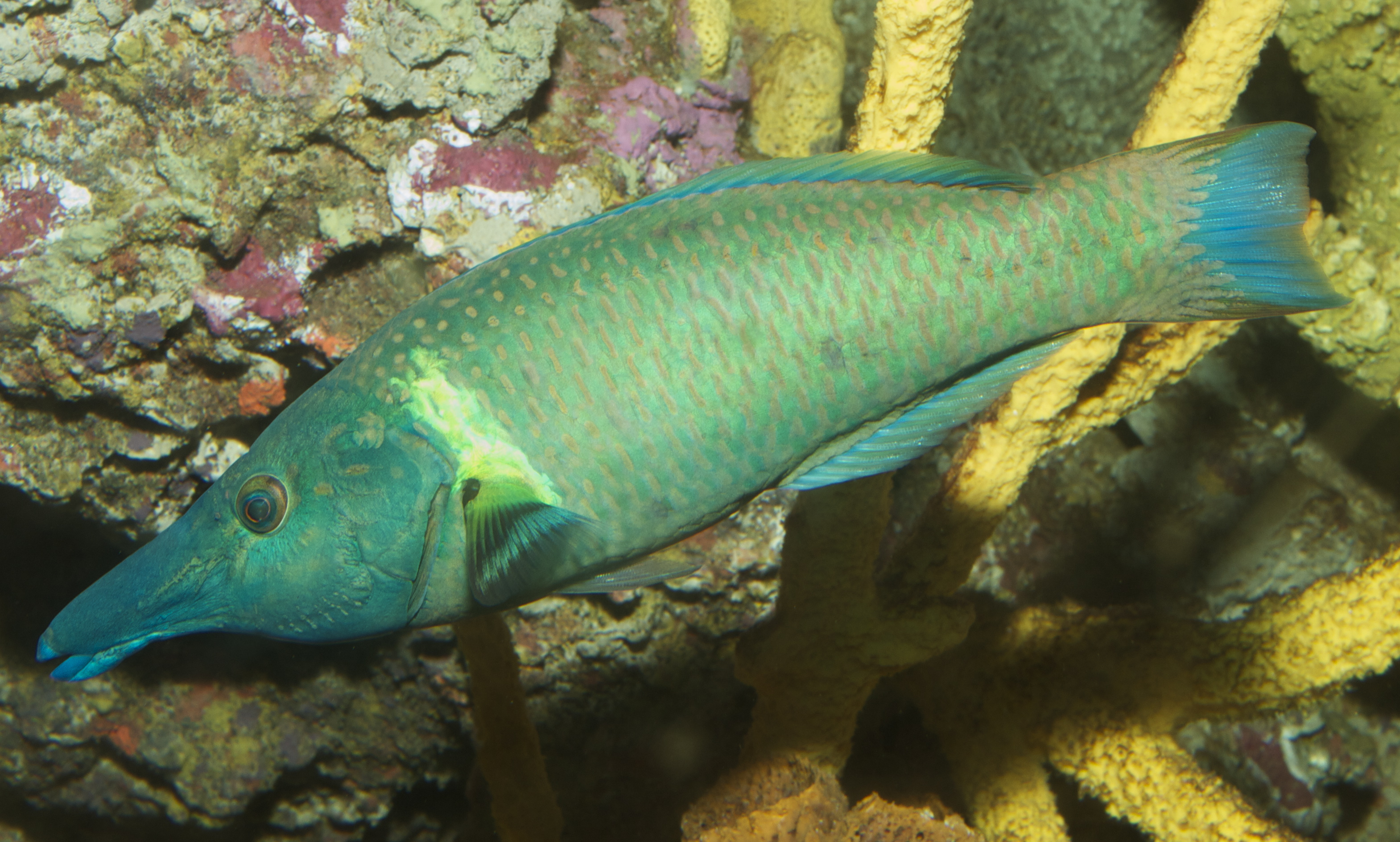
- Male

Conservation status
- Least Concern (IUCN 3.1)

Scientific classification
- Kingdom: Animalia
- Phylum: Chordata
- Class: Actinopterygii
- Order: Labriformes
- Family: Labridae
- Genus: Gomphosus
- Species: G. varius

Binomial name
- Gomphosus varius Lacépède, 1801

Synonyms
- Gomphosus tricolor Quoy & Gaimard, 1824

= Gomphosus varius =

Species of fish

The bird wrasse, Gomphosus varius, is a species of the wrasse family.

== Description ==
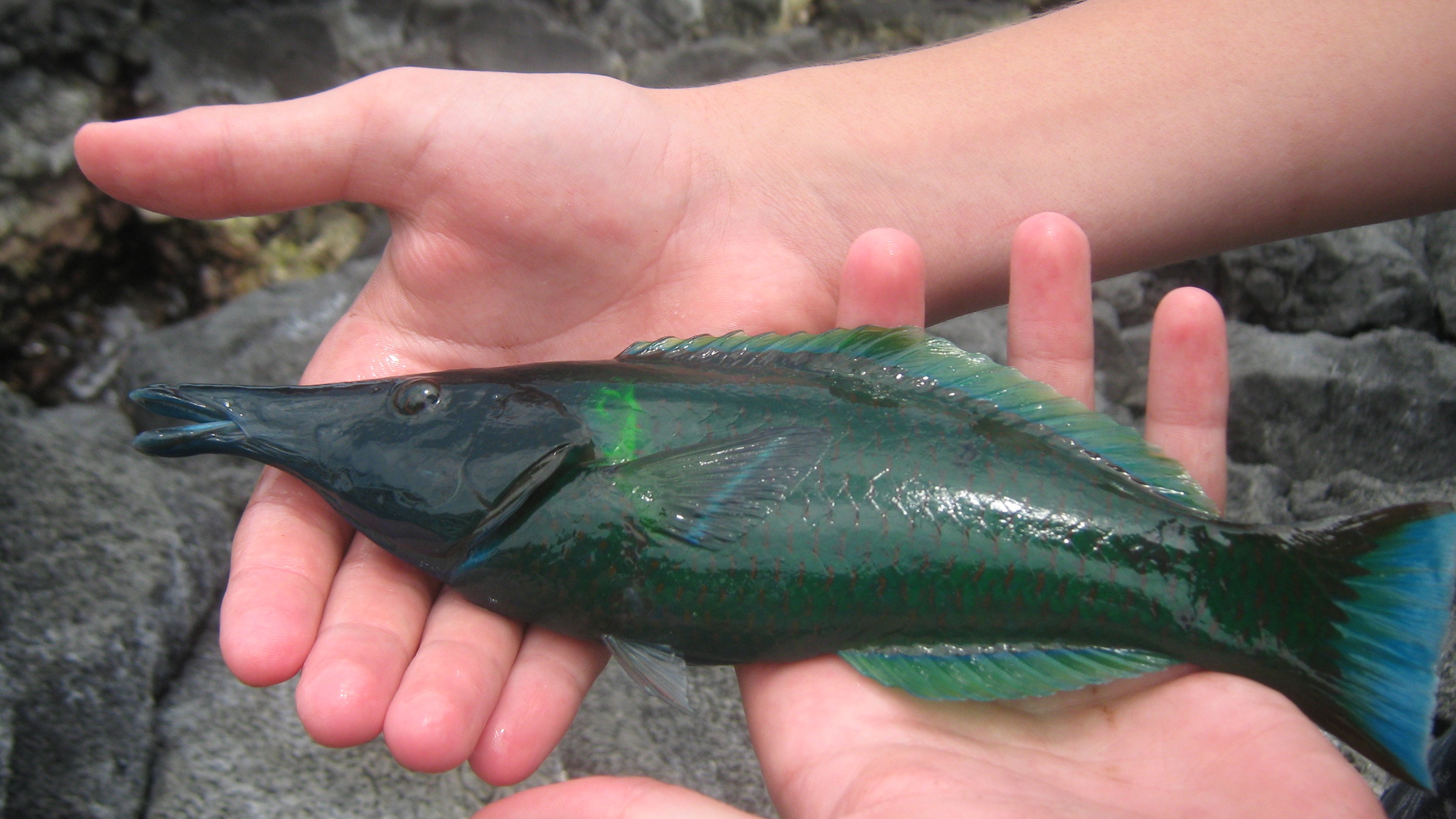
Showing the size of the male

The bird wrasse is a medium-sized fish which can reach a standard length of 30 cm (12 in). It has an elongated body, laterally compressed, with a truncated tail and a long snout. Adults are relatively easy to recognize by their characteristic long nose and the jerky flapping of their pectoral fins when swimming. Juveniles are more difficult to identify, as they haven't yet developed the characteristic prominent snout. Gomphosus varius can be confused with its close relative Gomphosus caeruleus, but differs from the latter by its color pattern and its geographic range. Like many wrasses, Gomphosus varius is a sequential hermaphrodite. As it changes sex, its body shape, color intensity and pattern vary considerably.

The female is smaller than the male and its body color is duller. The anterior half or the first third of the body is light-colored: the belly and chest are pearly white, the scales of the flanks are grayish and lined with a dark border, the upper half of the snout is red-orange, a brown longitudinal fine line crosses the eye and the pectoral fins are translucent. The male body color is more uniform than the female's. Its dominant color is greenish; the intensity varies from one individual to another, but also according to maturity and mating period. The head can also have a dark bluish color. A yellowish color, lighter green than the flanks, tints the shoulder of the pectoral fin.

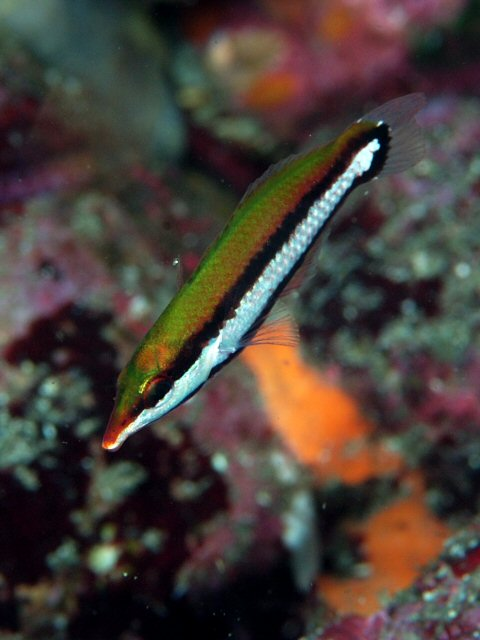
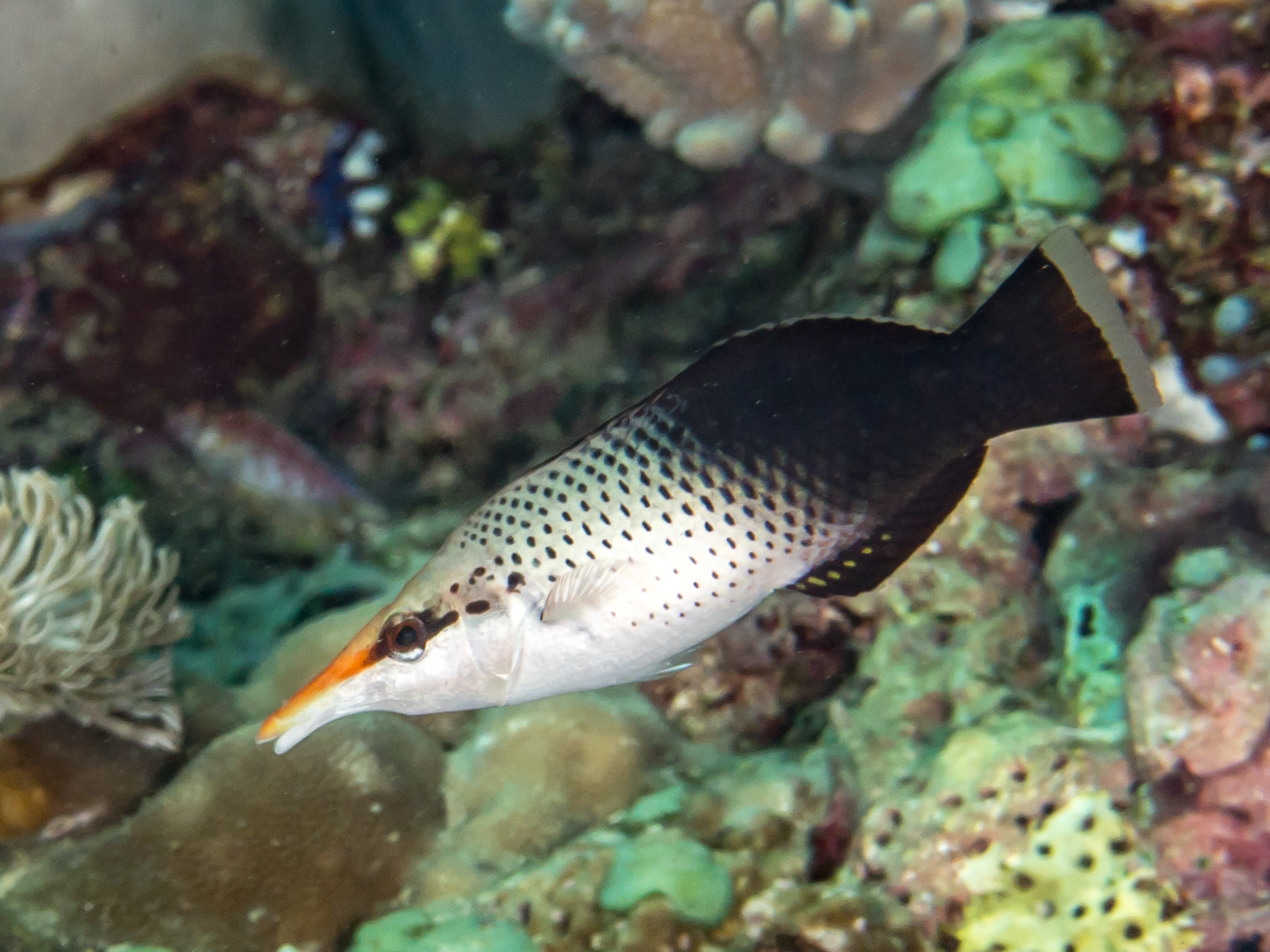
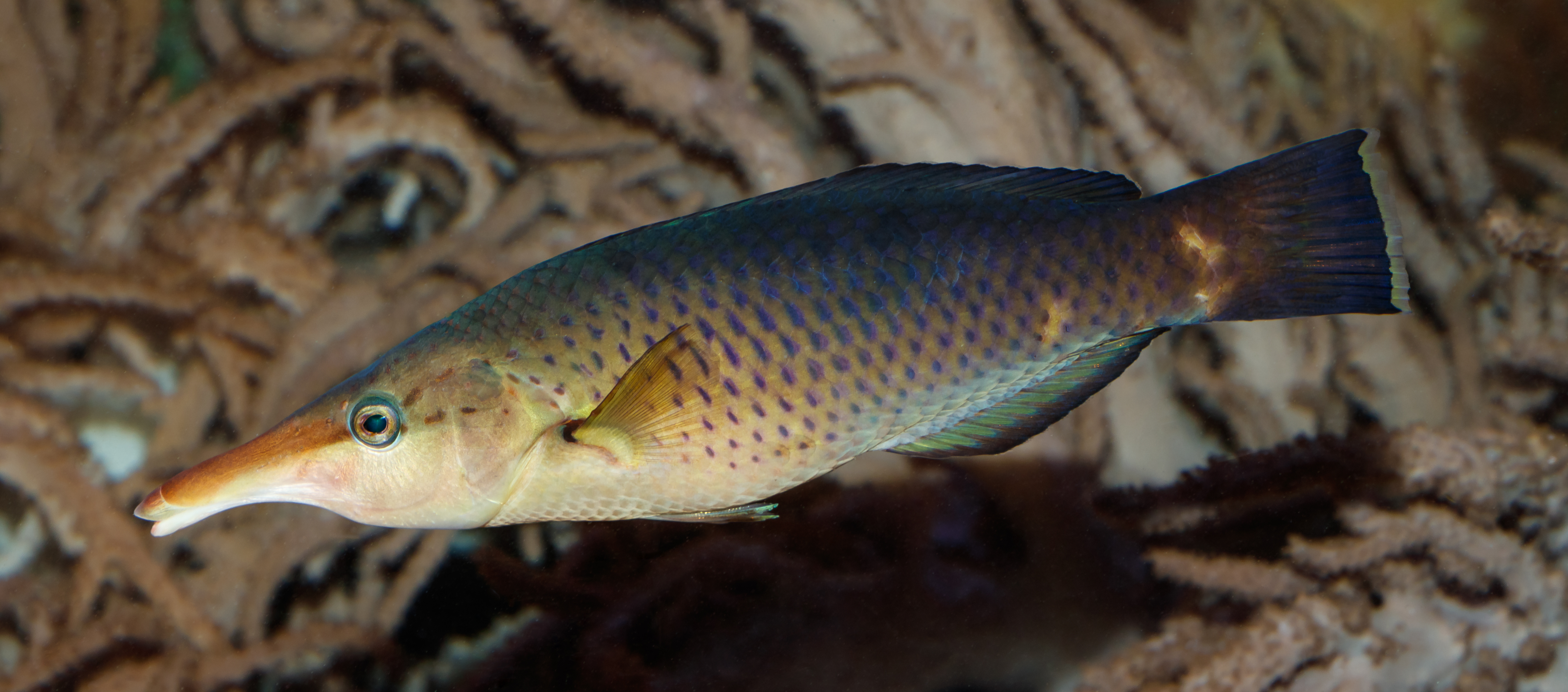
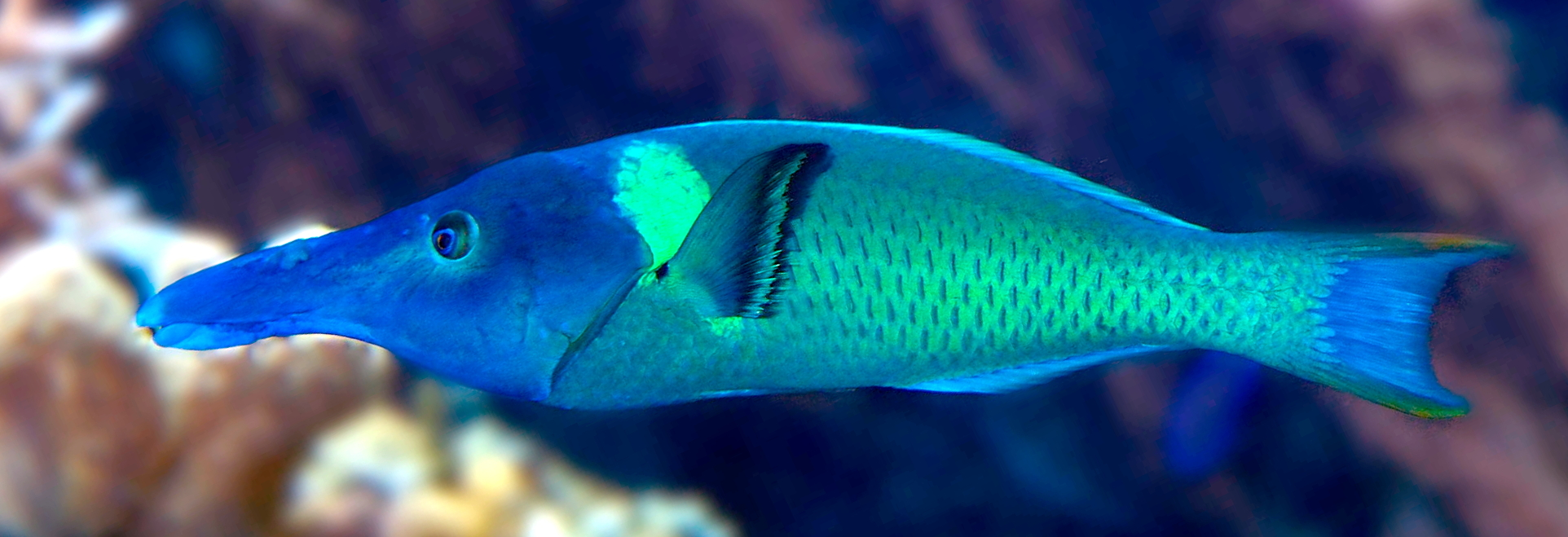
Growth series: from juvenile, to female, to male

== Distribution and habitat ==
The bird wrasse is found in tropical and subtropical waters of the Indo-Pacific, from the eastern part of the Indian Ocean to the oceanic islands of the Pacific Ocean, including the Hawaiian archipelago. They frequent external slopes, reefs, and lagoon areas rich in hard coral.

== Biology ==
The bird wrasse is diurnally active; it is usually solitary, but can sometimes be observed in small groups. Like other wrasses, it is carnivorous, its diet consisting primarily of small benthic crustaceans caught in corals, but it may also feed on brittle stars, molluscs and small fish. During its lifetime, the bird wrasse undergoes a sexual metamorphosis corresponding to sequential hermaphroditism; it may be a protogynous hermaphrodite, starting as a female and then become male.

== Hybridization ==
Gomphosus varius sometimes hybridizes with Thalassoma species in the wild, such as T. lunare and T. duperrey.
