= Philibert Commerson =

French naturalist (1727-1773)

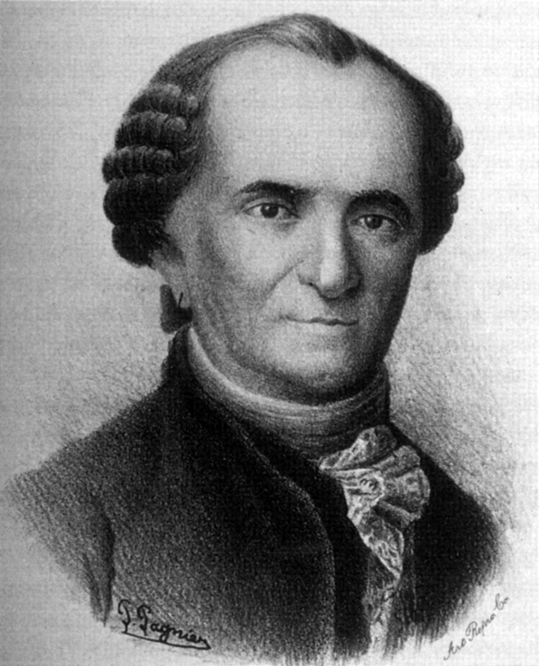
- Born: 18 November 1727; Châtillon-les-Dombes, Kingdom of France
- Died: 14 March 1773 (aged 45); Mauritius
- Scientific career
- Fields: Zoology; Botany; Natural history
- Workplaces: Muséum national d'histoire naturelle
- Author abbrev. (botany): Comm.

Philibert Commerson (French: [filibɛʁ kɔmɛʁsɔ̃]; 18 November 1727 – 14 March 1773), sometimes spelled Commerçon by contemporaries, was a French naturalist, best known for accompanying Louis Antoine de Bougainville on his voyage of circumnavigation in 1766–1769. The standard author abbreviation Comm. is used to indicate this person as the author when citing a botanical name.

== Biography ==
Commerson was born at Châtillon-les-Dombes in France. He studied in Montpellier, and for a time was a practicing physician. He was in contact with Carl Linnaeus, who encouraged him to study fish of the Mediterranean.

Commerson returned to live at Châtillon-les-Dombes, where he occupied himself in creating a botanical garden in 1758. After the death of his wife in 1762, he moved to Paris.

In 1766, Commerson joined Bougainville on his voyage of circumnavigation after being recommended for the position of naturalist by the Paris Academy of Sciences. He had previously drawn up an extensive programme of nature studies for the Marine Ministry, in which he elaborated the "three natural kingdoms" which a naturalist should investigate on a voyage around the world. Among the wildlife that Commerson observed was a particular kind of dolphin in the Strait of Magellan, now known as Commerson's dolphin (Cephalorhynchus commersonii).

Commerson's partner and assistant, Jeanne Baré (also referred to Jeanne Baret), accompanied him on the voyage, disguised as a man. Baré acted as a nurse to Commerson, who was often ill, as well as assisting him in his scientific work. Her gender was only publicly discovered while the expedition was at Tahiti, but she remained with Commerson, nursing him and assisting him in his professional activities until the end of his life.

Commerson was an astute observer of the Tahitian people and culture, thanks in part to a remarkable lack of European prejudice compared to other early visitors to the island. Commerson and Bougainville together were responsible for spreading the myth of Tahitians as the embodiment of the concept of the noble savage.

Commerson also studied and collected plants wherever the expedition stopped; among others, he described the genus Bougainvillea. On the return voyage to France in 1768, he remained behind at Mauritius (the then-French Isle de France), in order to botanize there and on Madagascar, an island that fascinated him. Pierre Sonnerat, who would also become a renowned botanist, was his personal secretary on the Isle de France.

What admirable country Madagascar is! It would merit not a casual observer but entire academies. Madagascar, I may announce to naturalists, is their promised land; it is there that nature seems to have retreated as into a private sanctuary, to work on different models from any she has used elsewhere: The most curious, the most marvellous forms can be found at every step...

— Philibert Commerson, in a letter to Jérôme de Lalande, 1771

== Taxon described by him ==
- See Category:Taxa named by Philibert Commerson

== Species collected by Commerson ==
- The Wrasse Pastel ringwrasse, Hologymnosus doliatus was originally formally described as Labrus doliatus in 1801 by Bernard Germain de Lacépède in Volume 5 of his Histoire naturelle des poissons based on a drawing by Commerson. In 1801 Lacépède created the genus Hologymnosus and designated a species, Hologymnosus fasciatus, he had just described as its type species, this was later shown to be a synonym of H. doliatus.
- Commerson provided the first description of the Ring-tailed cardinalfish (Ostorhinchus aureus) from Réunion in the western Indian Ocean, but it was not published in a format allowing full citation. Therefore, the species name and description by Bernard Germain de Lacépède (who acknowledged Commerson) takes precedence, albeit with a nod to Commerson.
- Gomphosus caeruleus was formally described in 1801 by Bernard Germain de Lacépède in the third volume of his Histoire naturelle des poissons from types collected by Commerson. No type locality was given, but now it is known to be Mauritius.

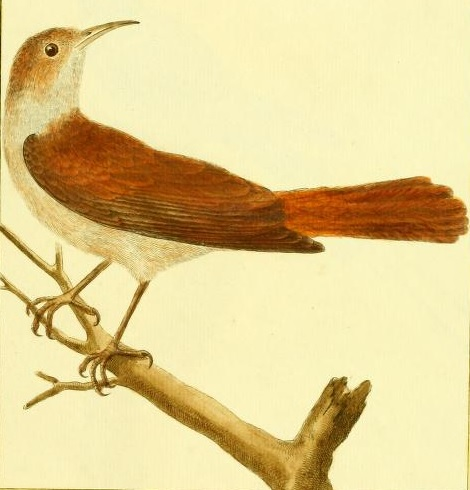
Rufous hornero drawn by François-Nicolas Martinet sometime before 1780 for the book Histoire Naturelle.

- The first notes taken on Rufous hornero Furnarius rufus were made by Commerson in 1767, from a specimen obtained at Barragán cove during Louis Antoine de Bougainville's expedition. Commerson named the bird as Turdus fulvus and his notes were later published by Georges Buffon in his Histoire Naturelle in 1779. However, the rufous hornero was first scientifically described, as Merops rufus, by the German naturalist Johann Friedrich Gmelin in the 13th edition of Systema Naturae published in 1788.Gmelin, Johann Friedrich (1788). Systema Naturae. Vol. 1. Leipzig. p. 465.
- Scatophagus tetracanthus was first formally described Chaetodon tetracanthus as in 1802 by the French naturalist Bernard Germain de Lacépède with no type locality given, Lacépède's description was based on a drawing and manuscript by Commerson. The specific name is a compound of tetra meaning "four" and acanthus which means "spines", a reference to the four anal fin spines.
- Hologymnosus annulatus was formally described in 1801 as Labrus annulatus by Bernard Germain de Lacépède in Volume 3 of his Histoire naturelle des poissons with the type locality given as Mauritius. Lacépède was following earlier work by Commerson.
- Trachinotus baillonii was formally described in 1801 by the French naturalist Bernard Germain de Lacépède (1726-1825) as Caesiomorus bailloni, the name having been written in a manuscript by Commerson, but was not formally published. The identity of the person nonoured in the specific name is not clear but is either the French naturalist Louis Antoine François Baillon (1778-1851), or his father Jean François Emmanuel Baillon (1742-1801), who was also a naturalist.
- Artocarpus heterophyllus was named by Jean-Baptiste Lamarck

== Death ==
Commerson died at Mauritius at the age of 45. Although his numerous manuscripts and herbaria were brought to Paris after his death they were never systematically organized and evaluated. Unaware of his death in 1773, the Paris Academy of Sciences elected him as a fellow botanist just a few months later.

== Taxa named in his honor ==
In 1786, botanist Jean-Baptiste Lamarck named the genera Commersonia and Humbertia in his honour.

In 1798, French naturalist Bernard Germain de Lacépède named the Giant Frogfish Antennarius commerson after Commerson.

In 1800, Lacépède named a species of mackerel of the family Scombridae found in a wide-ranging area in Southeast Asia, but as far west as the east coast of Africa and from the Middle East and along the northern coastal areas of the Indian Ocean, and as far east as the South West Pacific Ocean, the Narrow-barred Spanish mackerel (Scomberomorus commerson) after Commerson.

In 1801, Pomadasys commersonnii was first formally described as Labrus commersonnii by Lacépède with the type locality given as Grand golfe de l'Inde, interpreted as rivers of Madagascar. The specific name honors Commerçon, whose name is sometimes spelled Commerson, Lacepède used Commerçon's drawings and notes to base his description on. The specific name argenteus means "silver" and refers to the main colour of this species.

Also in 1801, Scomberoides commersonnianus was formally described by the French zoologist Bernard Germain de Lacépède with the type locality given as Fort Dauphin in the Toliara Province of Madagascar. The specific name uses the Latin suffix ianus meaning "belonging to" and adds this to the surname of Commerçon, this also being spelled as Commerson, whose notes and illustration were used by Lacépède as the base for his description of the species.

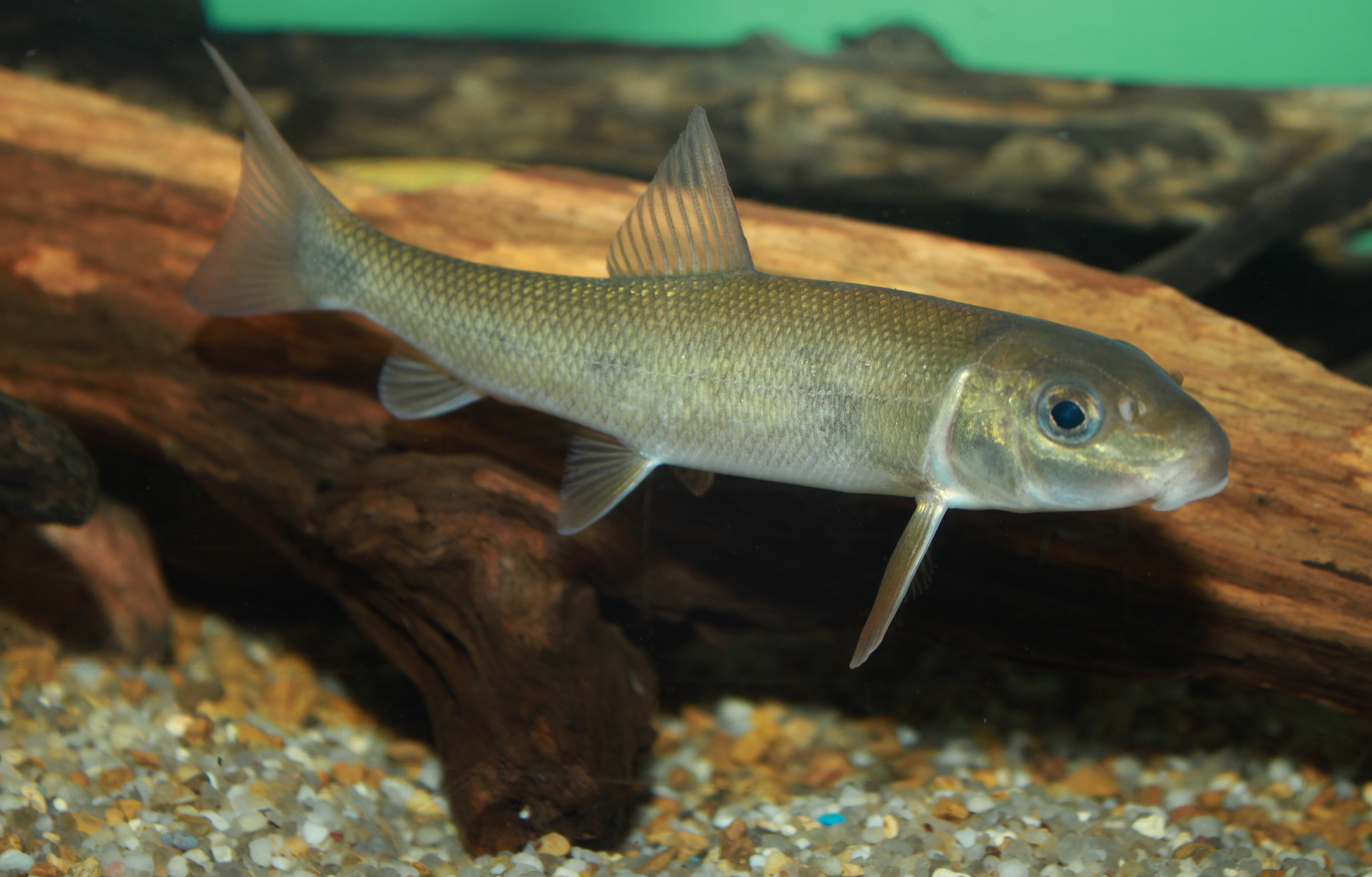
White Sucker, Catostomus commersonii

In 1803, Lacépède named a species of North American freshwater fish Catostomus commersonii in his honour.

Also in 1803, Lacépède named a species of anchovy Stolephorus commersonnii after Commerson.

In 1804, The dolphin Commerson's dolphin (Cephalorhynchus commersonii) is named by Lacépède after the French naturalist Commerson, who first described them in 1767 after sighting them in the Strait of Magellan.

In 1813, Étienne Geoffroy Saint-Hilaire described Commerson's roundleaf bat (Macronycteris commersoni), also known as Commerson's leaf-nosed bat, which is a species of bat endemic to Madagascar. It is named after French naturalist Philibert Commerson (1727-1773).

In 1836, Achille Valenciennes named Hypostomus commersoni which is a species of catfish in the family Loricariidae. It is native to South America, where it occurs in the Paraná River drainage, including the Iguazu River, the Paraguay River, the Río de la Plata, and the Dulce River. It is typically found in rivers with muddy substrates and moderate currents.

In 1838, Eduard Rüppell named the Bluespotted Cornetfish (Fistularia commersonii), also known as Smooth Cornetfish or Smooth Flutemouth, which is a marine fish which belongs to the family Fistulariidae after Commerson. This very long and slender reef-dweller belongs to the same order as the pipefishes and seahorses, called Syngnathiformes.

Synaptura commersonnii, Commerson's sole is named after him.

Cylindrocline commersonii is a species of flowering plant in the family Asteraceae, named after Commerson. It is found only in Mauritius. Its natural habitat is subtropical or tropical dry forests.

== Other honors ==
Commerson Crater which is a caldera in the mountains of Réunion is named after him.

== See also ==
- European and American voyages of scientific exploration
- French naturalists
- List of biologists
