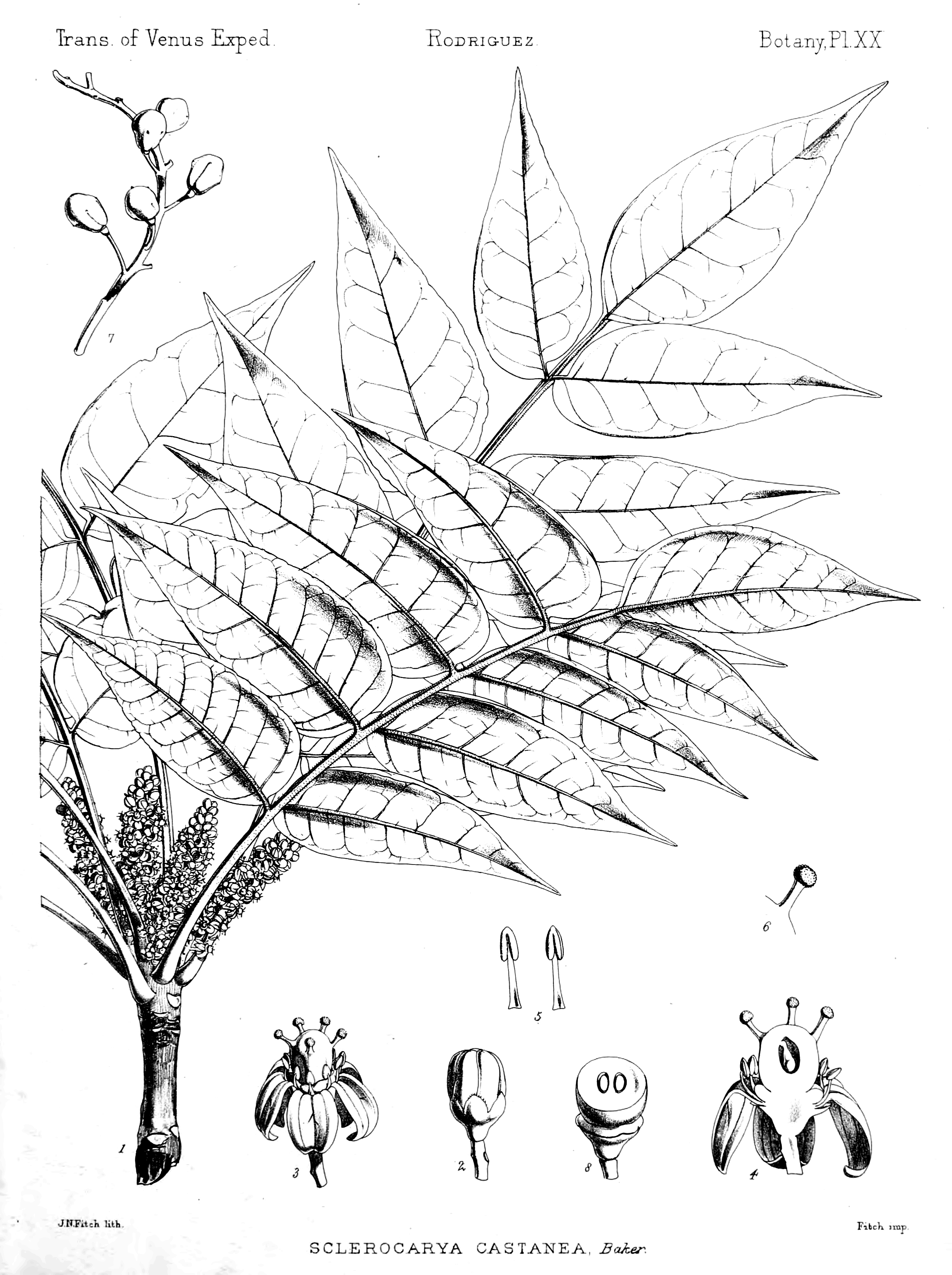

Scientific classification
- Kingdom: Plantae
- Clade: Tracheophytes
- Clade: Angiosperms
- Clade: Eudicots
- Clade: Rosids
- Order: Sapindales
- Family: Anacardiaceae
- Subfamily: Spondiadoideae
- Genus: Poupartia; Comm. ex Juss. (1789)

Synonyms
- Shakua Bojer

= Poupartia =

Genus of flowering plants

Poupartia is a genus of plant in family Anacardiaceae. From the islands of Madagascar, Mauritius, Rodrigues, and Réunion, all in the Indian Ocean.

== Taxonomy ==
The genus name of Poupartia is in honour of François Poupart (d. 1708), a French physician, anatomist and entomologist. It was first described and published in Gen. Pl. on page 372 in 1789.

== Species ==
As of July 2020, Plants of the World online has 8 accepted species:

- Poupartia borbonica J.F.Gmelin
- Poupartia castanea (Baker) Engl.
- Poupartia chapelieri (Guillaumin) H. Perrier
- Poupartia gummifera Sprague
- Poupartia minor (Bojer) L.Marchand
- Poupartia orientalis Capuron ex Randrianasolo & J.S.Mill.
- Poupartia pubescens Marchand
- Poupartia silvatica H.Perrier
