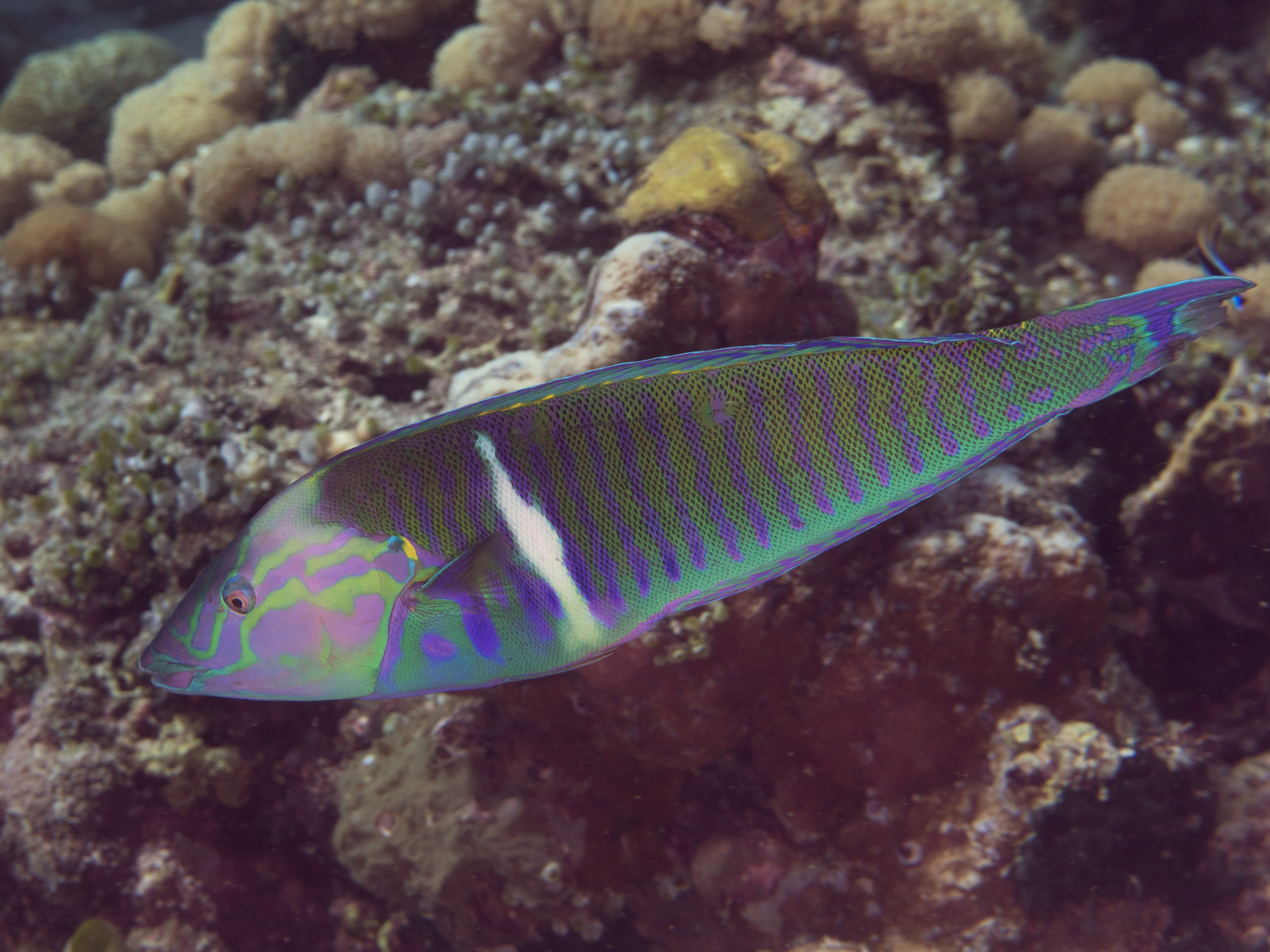
- In Indonesia

Conservation status
- Least Concern (IUCN 3.1)

Scientific classification
- Kingdom: Animalia
- Phylum: Chordata
- Class: Actinopterygii
- Division: Teleostei
- Order: Labriformes
- Family: Labridae
- Genus: Hologymnosus
- Species: H. doliatus

Binomial name
- Hologymnosus doliatus (Lacépède, 1801)

Synonyms
- Labrus doliatus Lacepède, 1801; Hologymnosus fasciatus Lacepède, 1801; Julis oxyrhynchos Bleeker, 1857; Julis rosea Quoy & Gaimard, 1834

= Hologymnosus doliatus =

Species of fish

Hologymnosus doliatus, commonly called Pastel ringwrasse, is a marine ray-finned fish belonging to the family Labridae, the wrasses, which is found in the Indo-Pacific area.

== Taxonomy ==
Hologymnosus doliatus was originally, formally described as Labrus doliatus in 1801 by Bernard Germain de Lacépède in Volume 5 of his Histoire naturelle des poissons based on a drawing by the French explorer and naturalist Philibert Commerson (1727-1773). In 1801 Lacépède created the genus Hologymnosus and designated a species, Hologymnosus fasciatus, he had just described as its type species, this was later shown to be a synonym of H. doliatus.

== Distribution ==
Hologymnosus doliatus is found in the Indian and Pacific Oceans from East Africa to South Africa east to Samoa and the Line Islands, north to Japan and south to the Great Barrier Reef, Lord Howe Island and New Caledonia.

In Western Australia it reaches as far south as Ningaloo Reef.

== Description ==
Hologymnosus doliatus has a long, slender body covered with small scales, although it has a naked head. The males are bluish-green to pale reddish marked with lavender bars, they have a pale band to the rear of the pectoral fin and orange lines mark the head. Females are bluish, greenish or greyish and have 20-23 orange bars along their flanks with a bluish-black spot on the posterior edge of the gill cover. The juveniles are whitish in colour and have three thin orange-red stripes. The dorsal fin has 9 spines and 12 soft rays while the anal fin has 3 spines and 12 soft rays. They can grow to a length of 50 centimetres (20 in).

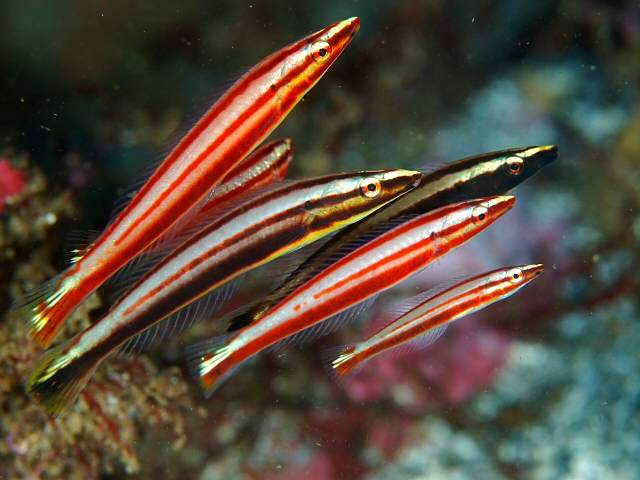
Young juveniles

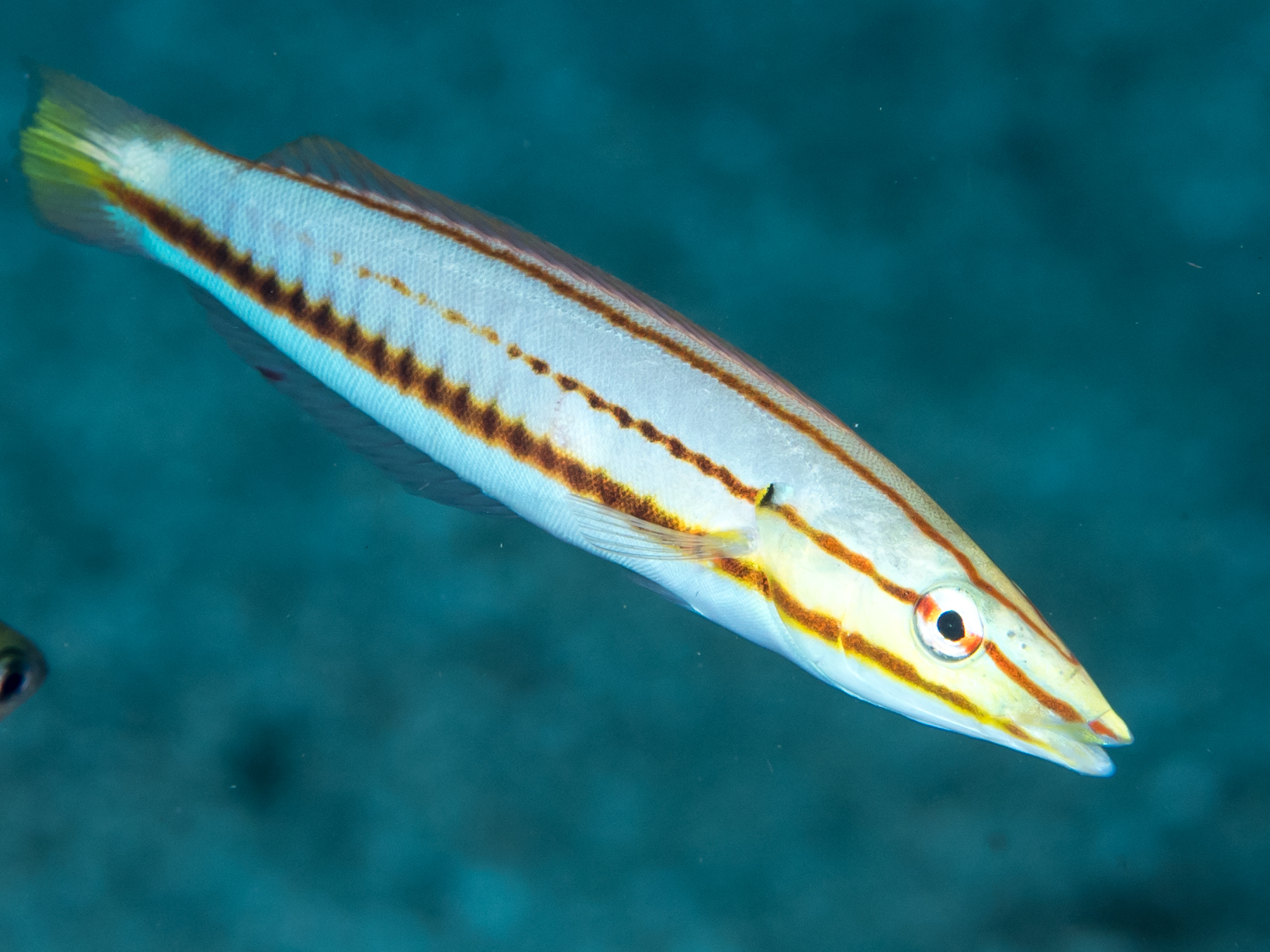
Older juvenile

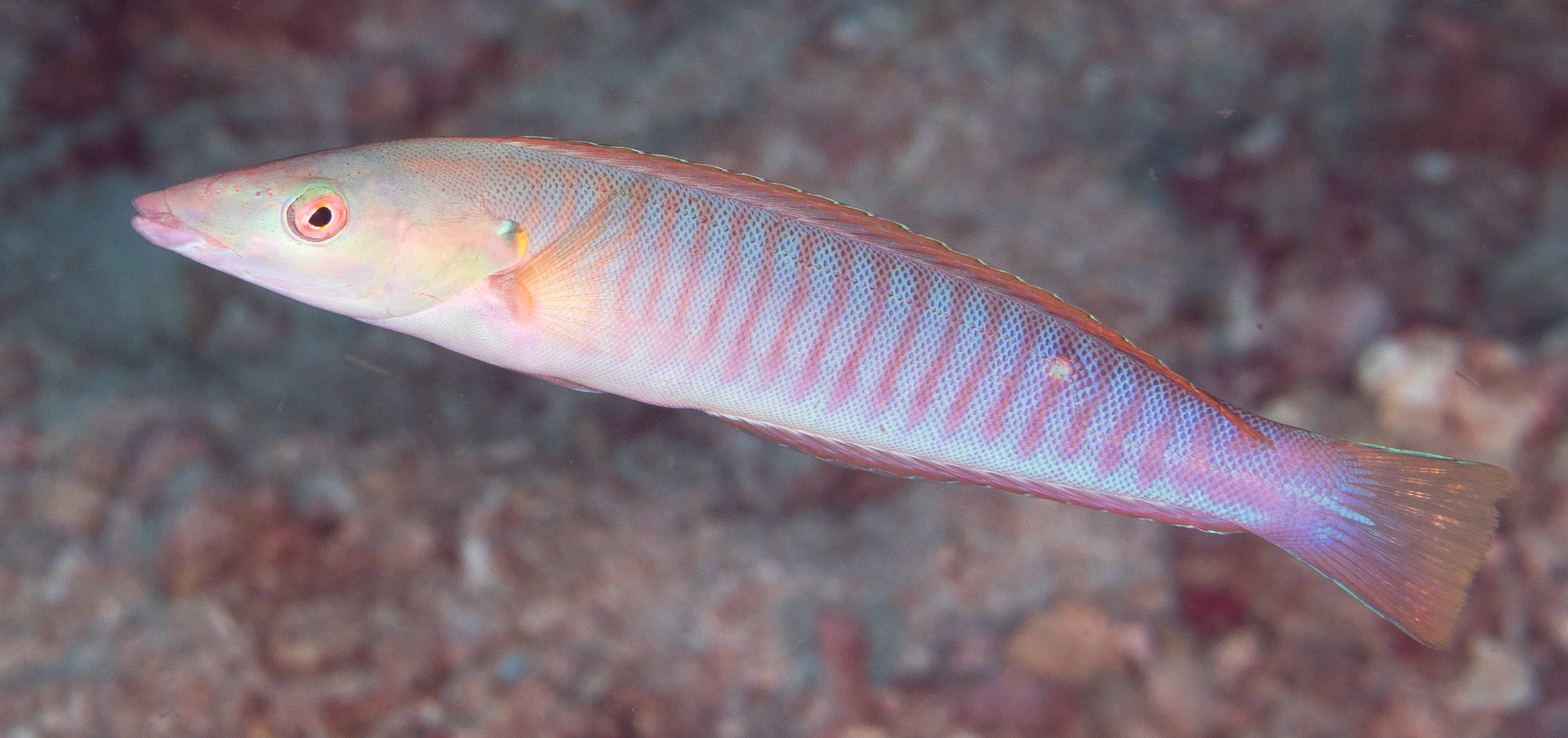
Initial phase

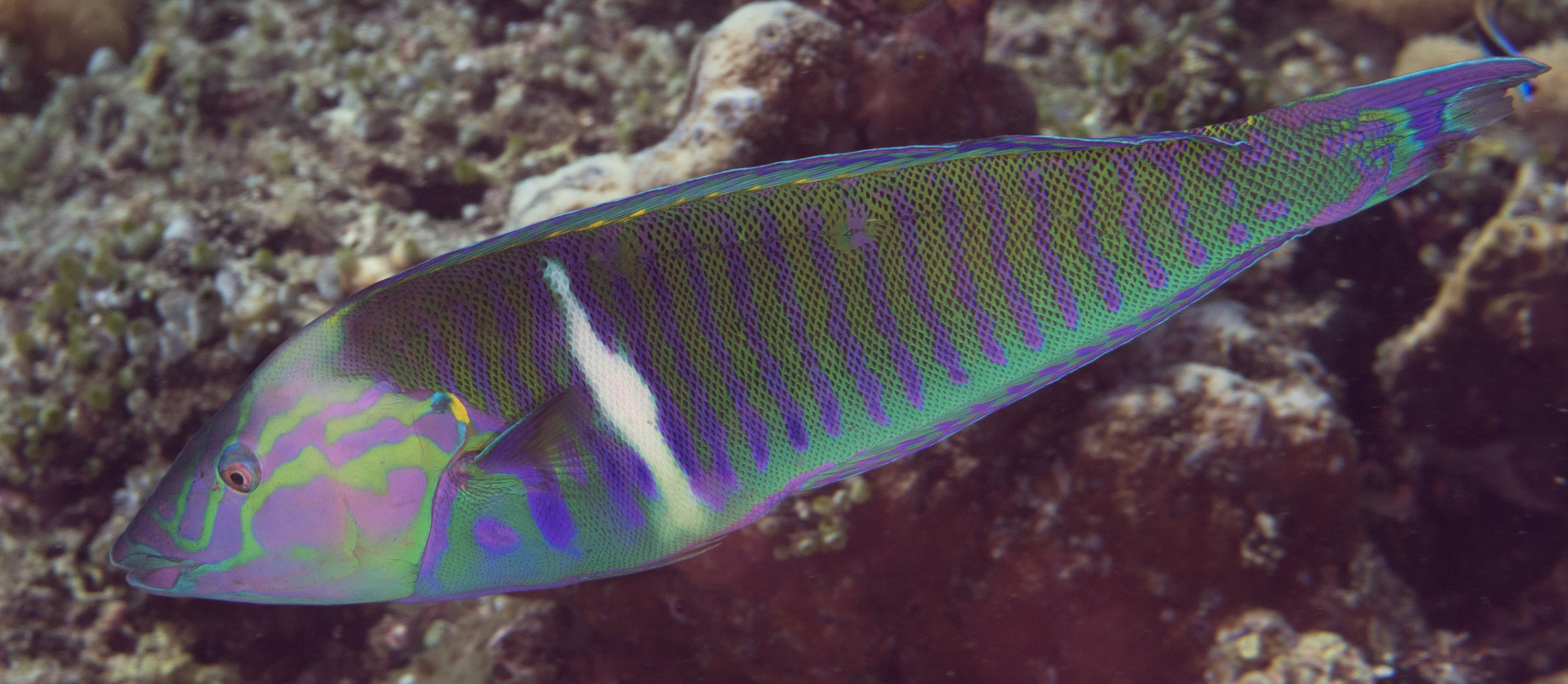
Terminal phase

== Habitat and biology ==
Hologymnosus doliatus occurs in seaward reefs where there is mixed sand, rubble and coral at depths which extend to at least 30 metres (98 ft). Juveniles live in groups close to the bottom while the adults occur high above the bottom. The females are also normally found in small groups while the males are solitary and territorial, guarding a large section of reef. This carnivorous species feeds mostly on fishes, which make up 50% of their diet and crustacean, especially shrimps, they will also feed on brittlestars and polychaete worms.

== Human usage ==
Hologymnosus doliatus is collected for the aquarium trade and is taken by small scale, subsistence fisheries.
