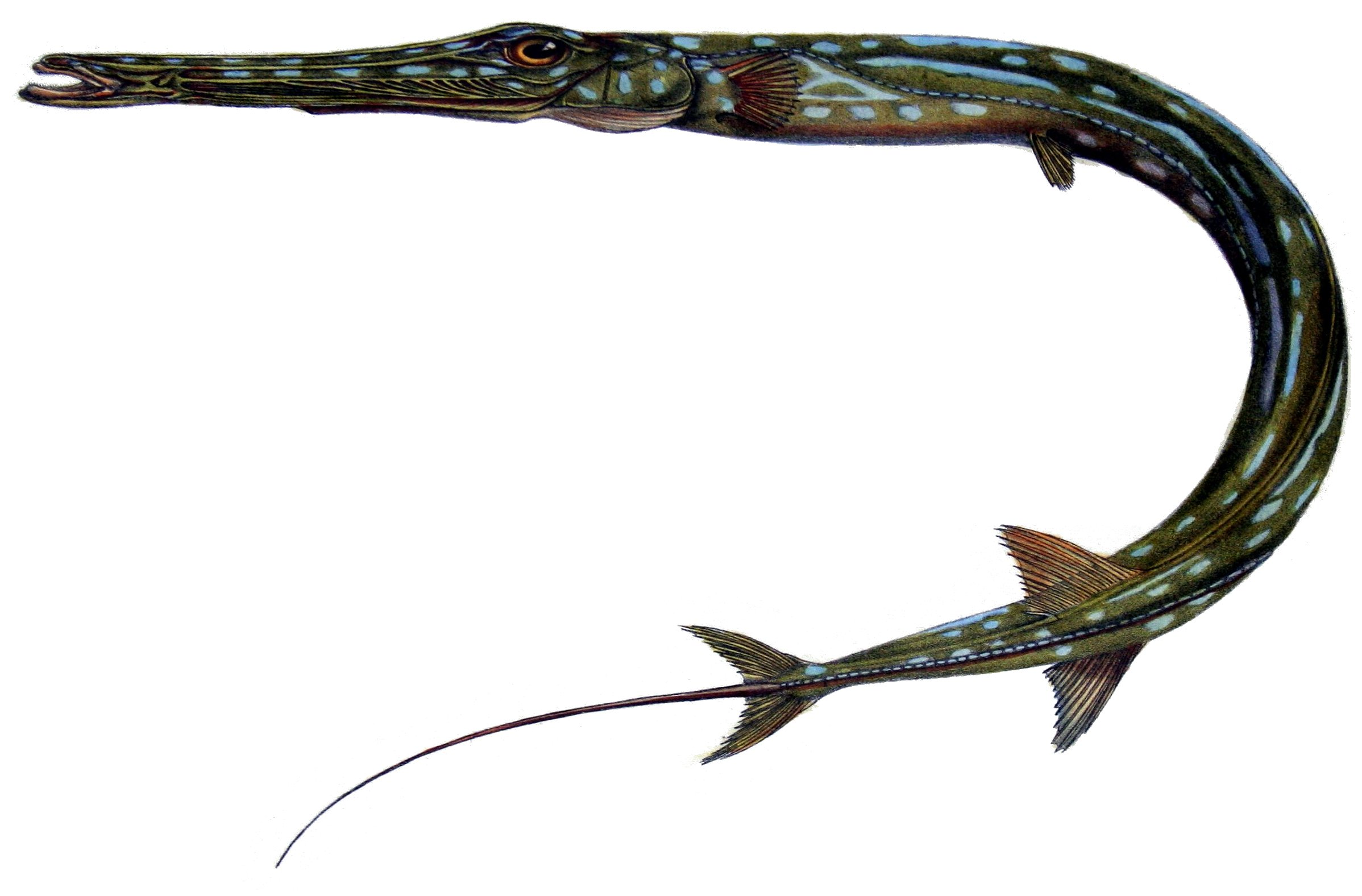
- Painting by Francis de Laporte de Castelnau, 1856

Conservation status
- Least Concern (IUCN 3.1)

Scientific classification
- Kingdom: Animalia
- Phylum: Chordata
- Class: Actinopterygii
- Division: Teleostei
- Order: Syngnathiformes
- Family: Fistulariidae
- Genus: Fistularia
- Species: F. tabacaria

Binomial name
- Fistularia tabacaria Linnaeus, 1758

Synonyms
- Fistularia neoeboracensis Mitchill, 1815; Flagellaria fistularis Gronow, 1854; Aulostomus margravii Castelnau, 1855; Fistularia ocellata Duméril, 1861

= Fistularia tabacaria =

Species of fish

Fistularia tabacaria, the cornetfish, blue-spotted cornetfish, tobacco trumpetfish or unarmed trumpetfish, is a species of cornetfish found on Atlantic coasts of the Americas and West Africa.

== Description ==
This species grows to 200 cm (79 in) in total length, though most only reach 120 cm (47 in). The cornetfish is easily mistaken for the needlefish; the defining characteristic that separates the two is the cornetfish's smaller mouth and jaws with an elongated face in comparison to the needlefish's elongated jaw and mouth. The cornetfish is greenish-brown dorsally with overall pale blue spots and lines.

== Biology ==
Fistularia tabacaria is most frequently recorded in and over seagrass beds and coral reefs, although it also occurs over hard, rocky substrates. It is usually a solitary species that is very rarely seen in groups. It feeds mainly on small crustaceans and small fish.

It is an important component in the diet of the Atlantic bluefin tuna (Thunnus thynnus).

== Distribution ==
Fistularia tabacaria inhabits western Atlantic coastlines from Nova Scotia to Brazil including the Carribean and ranges from Mauritania to Angola and the Macaronesian Islands in the eastern Atlantic. They remain close to shore as they are bottom feeders who live no deeper than 200m, so they are confined to continental shelves.
