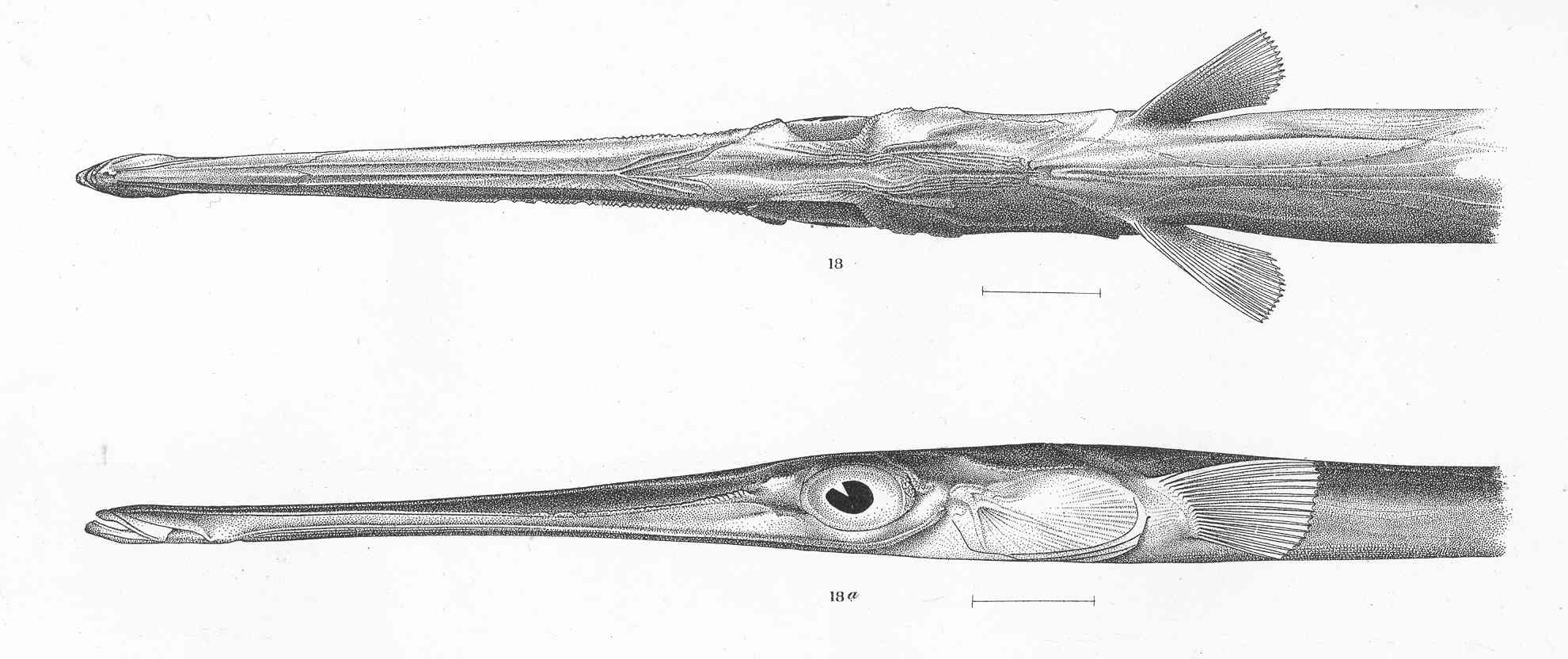

Conservation status
- Least Concern (IUCN 3.1)

Scientific classification
- Kingdom: Animalia
- Phylum: Chordata
- Class: Actinopterygii
- Order: Syngnathiformes
- Family: Fistulariidae
- Genus: Fistularia
- Species: F. corneta

Binomial name
- Fistularia corneta Gilbert & Starks, 1904

= Fistularia corneta =

Pacific cornetfish

Species of fish

Fistularia corneta, commonly known as the Pacific cornetfish or the deepwater cornetfish, is a marine fish in the family Fistulariidae. It is endemic to the eastern Pacific Ocean, being found from California to Peru, including many offshore islands. Adult fish are found deeper than 30 metres (98 ft) and have been observed to grow longer than 1 metre (3.3 ft), but are more commonly around 20 centimetres (7.9 in) long. F. corneta feeds on small fishes, and itself is most commonly used by humans as processed fishmeal, which can be marketed as fresh, salted or dried. It is an oviparous species.
