= Hologymnosus rhodonotus =

Conservation status
- Least Concern (IUCN 3.1)

Scientific classification
- Kingdom: Animalia
- Phylum: Chordata
- Class: Actinopterygii
- Order: Labriformes
- Family: Labridae
- Genus: Hologymnosus
- Species: H. rhodonotus

Binomial name
- Hologymnosus rhodonotus J. E. Randall & Yamakawa, 1988

Species of fish

Hologymnosus rhodonotus, the redback longface wrasse or the red slender wrasse, is a species of marine ray-finned fish from the family Labridae, the wrasses. It is found in seaward reefs in areas where coral and rubble are mixed at depths between 22 and 45 metres (72 and 148 ft). It is distributed in the western Pacific Ocean from Japan to Indonesia, as far south as the Timor Sea in Australian waters.
