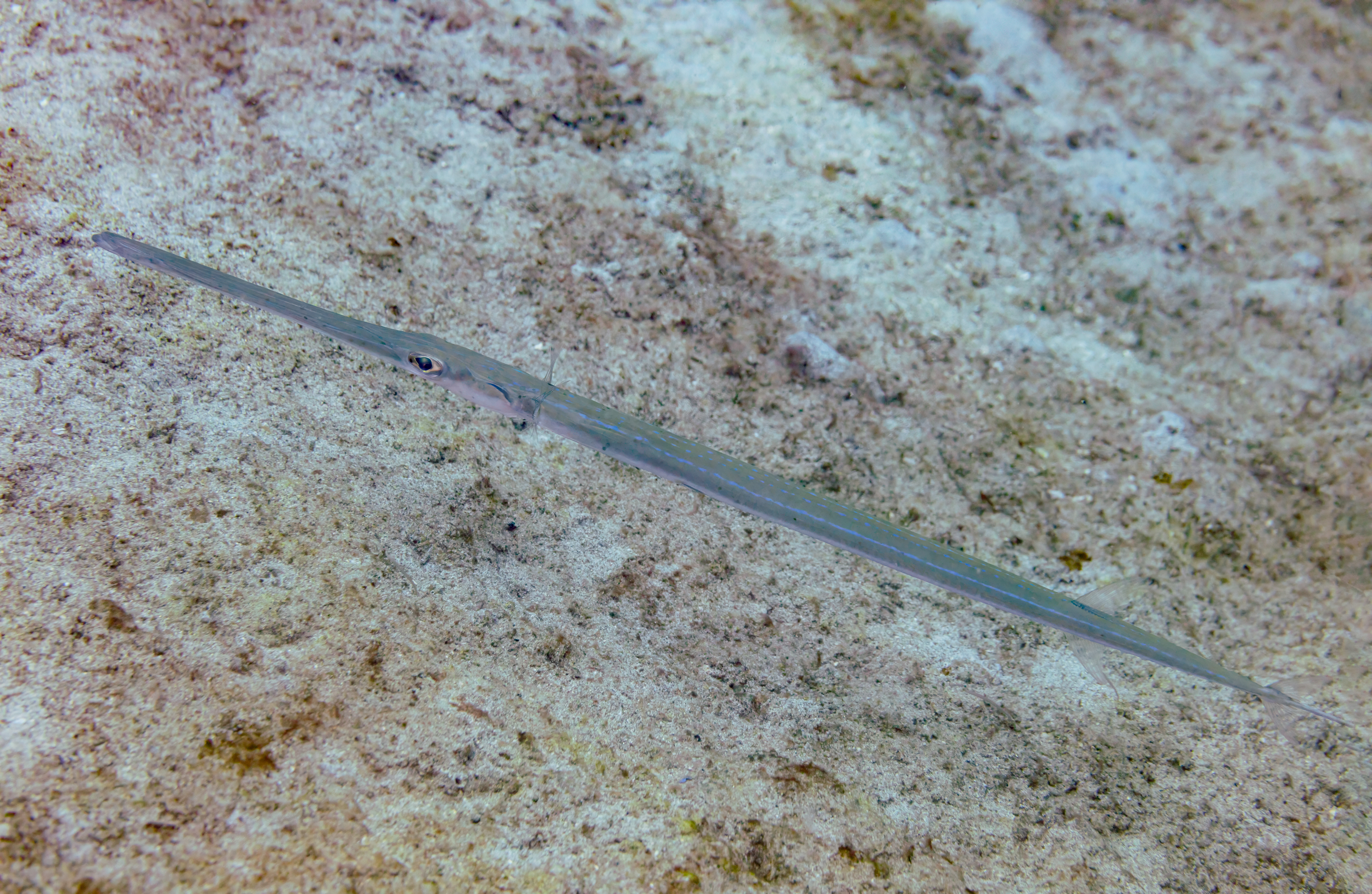
- Fistularia commersonii from Maldives

Conservation status
- Least Concern (IUCN 3.1)

Scientific classification
- Kingdom: Animalia
- Phylum: Chordata
- Class: Actinopterygii
- Division: Teleostei
- Order: Syngnathiformes
- Family: Fistulariidae
- Genus: Fistularia
- Species: F. commersonii

Binomial name
- Fistularia commersonii Rüppell, 1838

Synonyms
- Fistularia depressa Günther, 1880

= Bluespotted cornetfish =

Species of fish

The bluespotted cornetfish (Fistularia commersonii), also known as smooth cornetfish or smooth flutemouth, is a marine fish which belongs to the family Fistulariidae. This very long and slender reef-dweller belongs to the same order as the pipefishes and seahorses, called Syngnathiformes.

== Distribution ==
It is widespread in the tropical and subtropical waters of the Indo-Pacific as far north as Japan and east to the west coasts of the Americas, including Panama and Mexico's Sea of Cortez and the Red Sea. In 2000, its presence was reported in the Mediterranean Sea off Israel. In the past 20 years, this species experienced a population explosion in the Levantine Sea and a rapid spread westward, reaching the westernmost sectors of the Mediterranean and as far north as the Gulf of Lions by 2007. At this point, it has been recorded in all Mediterranean sub-basins and is now very common in the eastern part. F. commersonii is now considered an invasive species in the Mediterranean Sea because of its rapid development to reproductive stage and its detrimental effect on native fish populations. This is known as the Lessepsian migration which is an event that occurs when fish, usually fish from the Red Sea "migrate" to the Mediterranean Sea from the Suez Canal. The fish in the Mediterranean are all descended from a small number of ancestors, possibly as a result of a single invasion event, and are not as genetically variable as their conspecifics in the Red Sea.

== Morphology ==
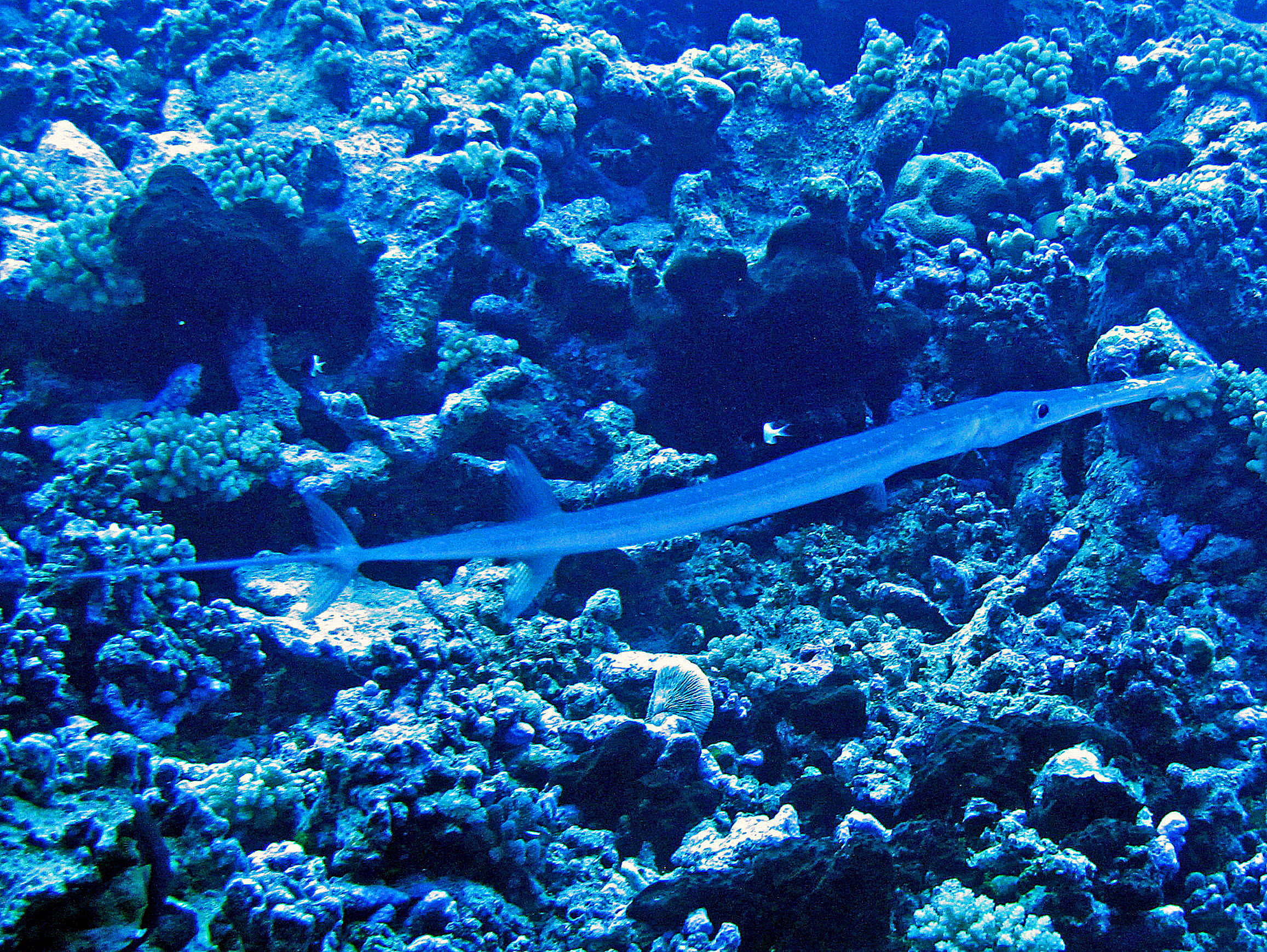
Fistularia commersonii from French Polynesia

The bluespotted cornetfish grows to a length of 1.6 m (5.2 ft), but the average is around 1 m (3 ft 3 in). It is notable for its unusually long, slender body shape. It has a tubular snout, large eyes, and a long tail filament lined with sensory pores that may help with detecting prey. Its body is tinted blue- to greenish-grey with two thin blue stripes or lines of dots on the back and lighter on the front. Its body pattern changes to a broad-banded pattern at night for camouflage.

== Biology ==
With a spot-fin porcupinefish, in the Red Sea

The bluespotted cornetfish is usually a solitary predator, stalking and feeding on small fishes, crustaceans, and squid. Sometimes, they feed in small groups along the bottom on small, bottom-dwelling fish, which their long snouts are very efficient at sucking up. These fish are adept at feeding on young fish that live in thickets of seagrass meadows (Posidonia oceanica), which can significantly reduce the ability of native fish populations to survive to reproductive adulthood. They can also hover or swim in small schools just below the surface. Reproduction is oviparous. The large eggs hatch and develop outside of the body. Larvae hatch at 6–7 mm (0.24–0.28 in).

Bacteria living in the mucus on the skin of the bluespotted cornetfish may allow it to glide more easily through salt water.

Parasites that live in bluespotted cornetfish continue to thrive in their hosts even as they colonise non-native locations. This contradicts the prevailing theory, called enemy release hypothesis, that parasites would not be able to survive in hosts as they encounter new marine territory. The presence of introduced parasites affects not only Fistularia commersonii, but also other fish and marine animals in their native habitats.

== Human relevance ==
The fish is of minor importance commercially, mostly being sold as fish meal, but also fresh and preserved. It is also sold as an aquarium fish.

== Name ==
The specific name honours French botanist Philibert Commerson (1727-1773).
