= Hologymnosus longipes =

Conservation status
- Least Concern (IUCN 3.1)

Scientific classification
- Kingdom: Animalia
- Phylum: Chordata
- Class: Actinopterygii
- Order: Labriformes
- Family: Labridae
- Genus: Hologymnosus
- Species: H. longipes

Binomial name
- Hologymnosus longipes (Günther, 1862)

Synonyms
- Coris longipes Günther, 1862

Species of fish

Hologymnosus longipes, the sidespot longface wrasse or the plain slender wrasse, is a species of marine ray-finned fish from the family Labridae, the wrasses. It occurs in the western Pacific Ocean.

== Description ==
In Hologymnosus longipes, the females are pale greenish-yellow to bluish-grey and have 2 rows of vertically elongated orange spots on their body, continuing to the head, where they merge to form stripes. The tail fin varies in colour from orange to yellow. Males are greenish, fading to whitish below, and have a green head, which is a pattern of pink bars radiating out from the eye; they also have orange bars on the flanks, which fade to pale lavenderish-blue to purple on the lower side towards the head. The males also have an oval black spot on the flanks above the pectoral fin, and a large, whitish patch on the posterior of the blue-coloured caudal fin. This species grows to a total length of 40 centimetres (16 in). The dorsal fin has 9 spines and 12 soft rays, while the anal fin has 3 spines and 12 soft rays.

== Distribution ==
Hologymnosus longipes is found in the Western Pacific in New Caledonia, Vanuatu, the Solomon Islands, and the Great Barrier Reef off Australia.

== Habitat and biology ==
Hologymnosus longipes is found in lagoon and seaward reefs, normally over areas of sand or rubble in the vicinity of coral heads in waters of depths between 5 and 30 metres (16 and 98 ft). This species is known to feed on crustacean, other invertebrates, and fish.

== Species description ==
Hologymnosus longipes was originally formally described as Coris longipes in 1862 by Albert Günther, with the type locality given as Aneiteum Island in Vanuatu.

== Human usage ==
Hologymnosus longipes is collected for the aquarium trade, and small-scale subsistence fisheries exploit it.
