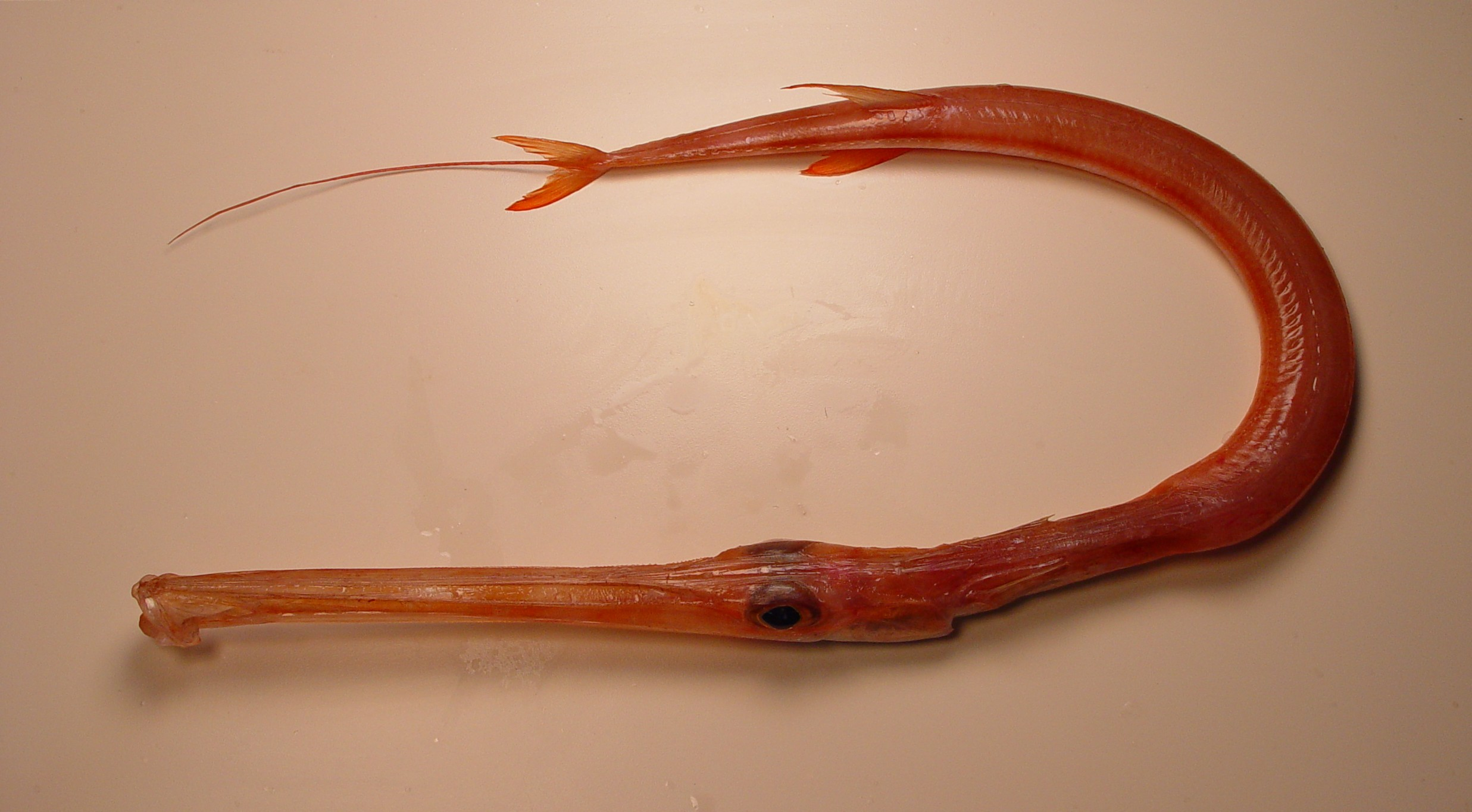

Conservation status
- Least Concern (IUCN 3.1)

Scientific classification
- Kingdom: Animalia
- Phylum: Chordata
- Class: Actinopterygii
- Division: Teleostei
- Order: Syngnathiformes
- Family: Fistulariidae
- Genus: Fistularia
- Species: F. petimba

Binomial name
- Fistularia petimba Lacépède, 1803

Synonyms
- Fistularia serrata Cuvier, 1816; Fistularia immaculata Cuvier, 1816; Fistularia villosa Klunzinger, 1871; Fistularia rubra Miranda-Ribeiro, 1903; Fistularia starksi Jordan & Seale, 1905

= Red cornetfish =

Species of fish

The red cornetfish (Fistularia petimba), also known as the rough flutemouth, is a cornetfish of the family Fistulariidae, found in subtropical and tropical oceans worldwide, at depths between 10 m (33 ft) and 200 metres (660 ft). They are up to 2 m (6.6 ft) in length but rarely exceed 1 m (3.3 ft).

== Range ==
Fistularia petimba is widespread in warmer parts of the Atlantic Ocean and Indo-Pacific, including the waters of Australia and Hawaii. It has also been recorded on rare occasions in the Mediterranean Sea. The species mostly lives in subtropical regions. In tropical areas, it tends to occur deeper or in places with cold upwellings.

== Biology ==
It occurs between 10–200 m (33–656 ft) depth, but most often at depths of 18–57 m (59–187 ft) over soft substrates. It is an oviparous species which lays large pelagic eggs which hatch into larvae of 6–7 millimetres (0.24–0.28 in), the juveniles move into estuarine habitats. This species is a crepuscular, stealthy predator which stalks its prey by moving slowly towards shoals of small fish, using its slender form to hide, and when it is close enough to its prey it darts forward and sucks it into its mouth.

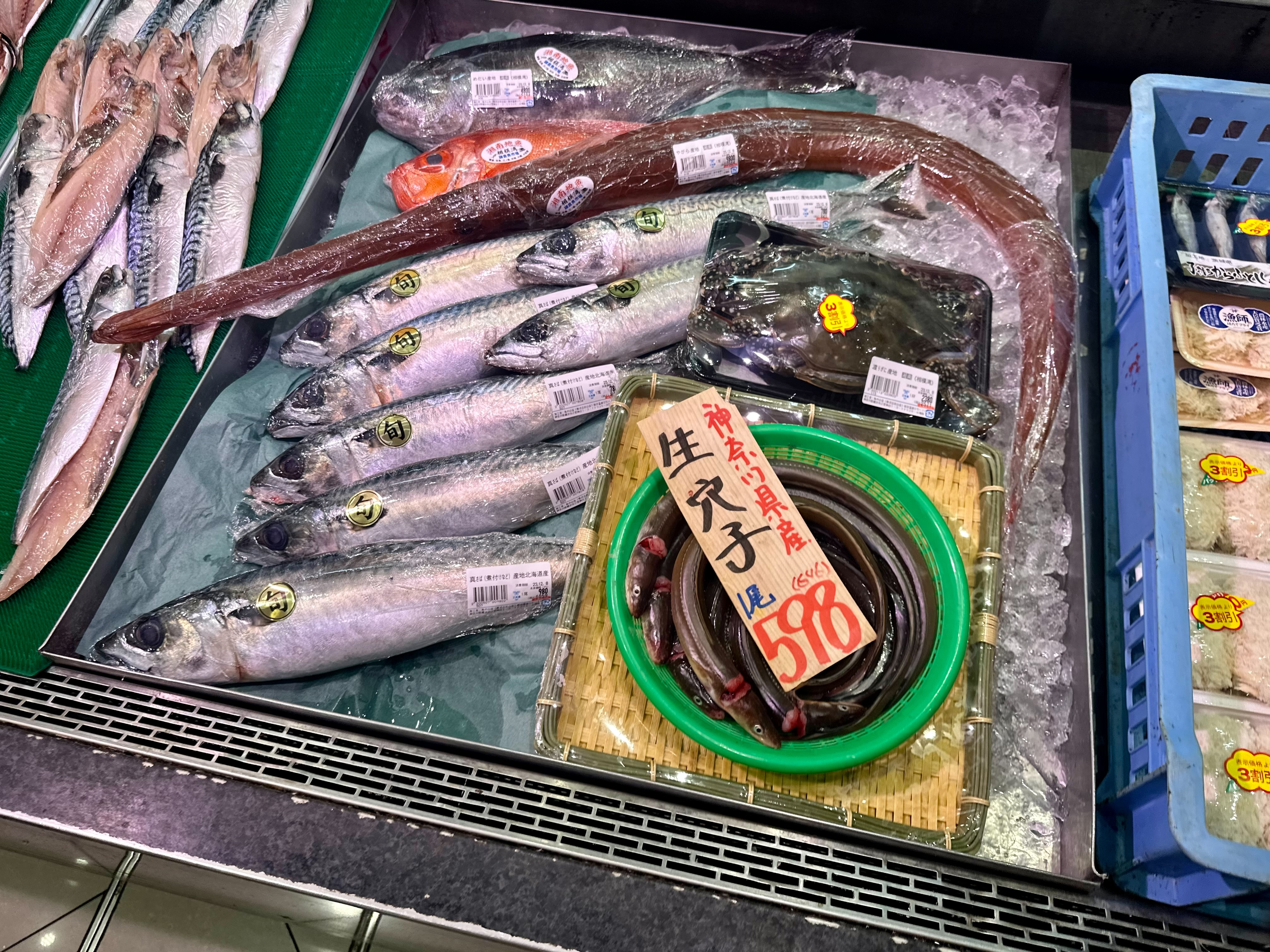
Red cornetfish, with other fish, for sale in Japan, 2023
