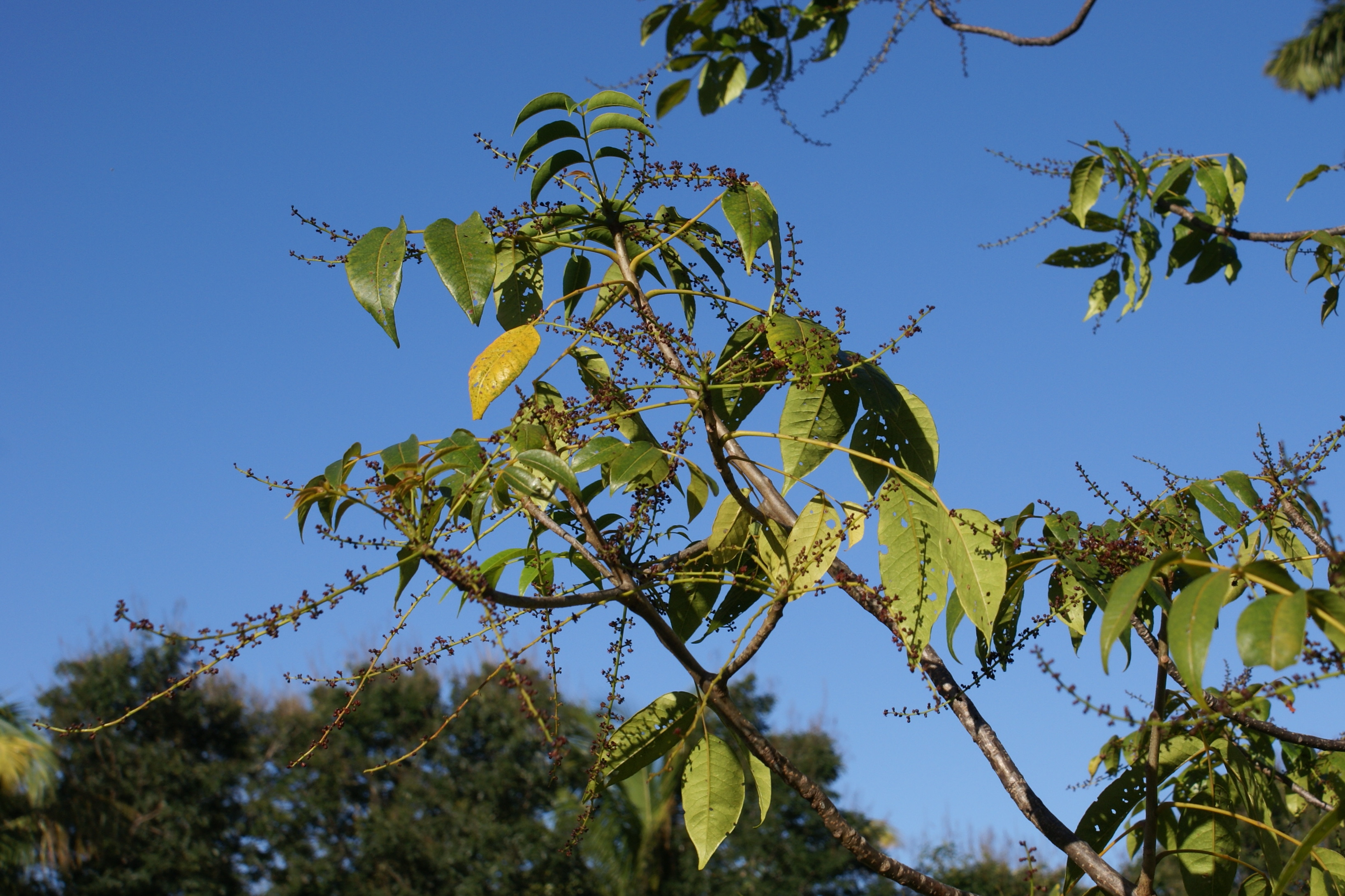
- flowering

Conservation status
- Critically Endangered (IUCN 2.3)

Scientific classification
- Kingdom: Plantae
- Clade: Tracheophytes
- Clade: Angiosperms
- Clade: Eudicots
- Clade: Rosids
- Order: Sapindales
- Family: Anacardiaceae
- Genus: Poupartia
- Species: P. borbonica

Binomial name
- Poupartia borbonica J.F.Gmel. (1791)

Synonyms
- Spondias borbonica (J.F.Gmel.) Baker (1877)

= Poupartia borbonica =

Species of flowering plant

Poupartia borbonica is a species of plant in the family Anacardiaceae. It is a tree native to Mauritius and Réunion.
