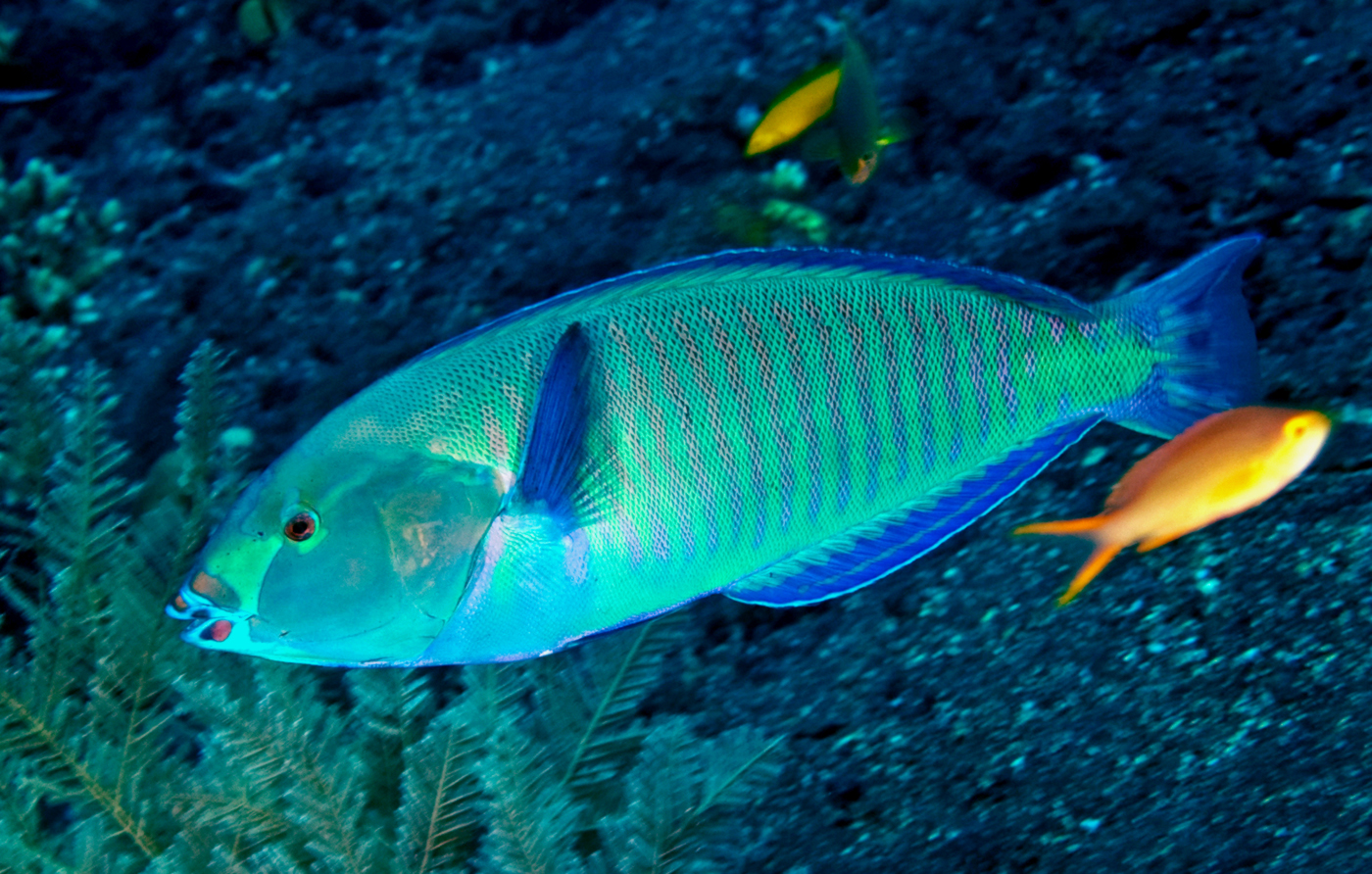
- Male (terminal phase)
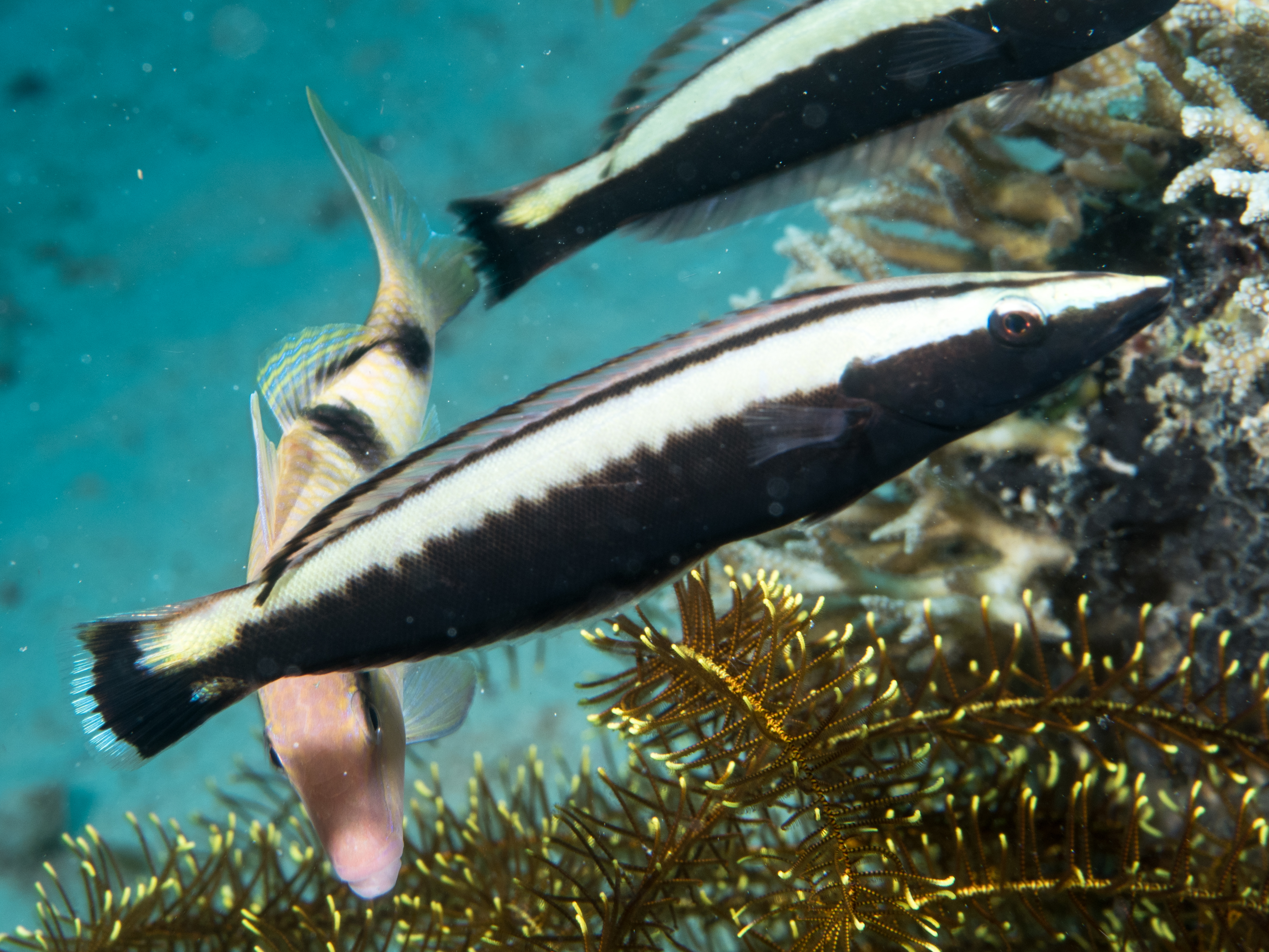
- Juveniles

Conservation status
- Least Concern (IUCN 3.1)

Scientific classification
- Kingdom: Animalia
- Phylum: Chordata
- Class: Actinopterygii
- Division: Teleostei
- Order: Labriformes
- Family: Labridae
- Genus: Hologymnosus
- Species: H. annulatus

Binomial name
- Hologymnosus annulatus (Lacépède, 1801)

Synonyms
- List: Labrus annulatus Lacépède, 1801; Labrus semidiscus Lacépède, 1801; Hemigumnosus semidiscus (Lacépède, 1801); Hologymnosus semidiscus (Lacépède, 1801)

= Hologymnosus annulatus =

Species of fish

Hologymnosus annulatus, the ring wrasse or ringed slender wrasse, is a species of marine ray-finned fish from the family Labridae, the wrasses, which has a wide Indo-Pacific distribution.

== Taxonomy ==
Hologymnosus annulatus was formally described in 1801 as Labrus annulatus by Bernard Germain de Lacépède in Volume 3 of his Histoire naturelle des poissons with the type locality given as Mauritius. Lacépède was following earlier work by Philibert Commerson.

== Distribution ==
Hologymnosus annulatus is distributed from the Red Sea south along the eastern, Indian Ocean coast of Africa to South Africa east to the Society Islands and Pitcairn Island in the Pacific its range extends north to southern Japan and south to the Great Barrier Reef and Rapa Island.

== Description ==
Hologymnosus annulatus has two colour forms which are geographically distinct, one in the Indian Ocean and the Red Sea and the other in the Pacific Ocean. In both forms the females are very dark, appearing almost black while the males are mostly greenish with a blue face. The males of the Indian form have a white band in the middle of the body, while the males of the Pacific form show a pale area on the caudal peduncle when breeding. The body of the males is marked with numerous bluish-red bars and they frequently show a pale yellowish bar above the origin of the anal fin, the head is pale purplish in colour with green to blue-green bands radiating out from the eye, the one running to the snout broadens and branches.

Juvenile H. annulatus bear a close resemblance to the juveniles of Malacanthus latovittatus. The juvelines are brown to olive brown and have 17-19 dark brown bars. They have a blue and black spot on gill cover, a black spot on side of lips with the spots on the lower lip being larger and the tail fin has a large whitish crescent near its end.

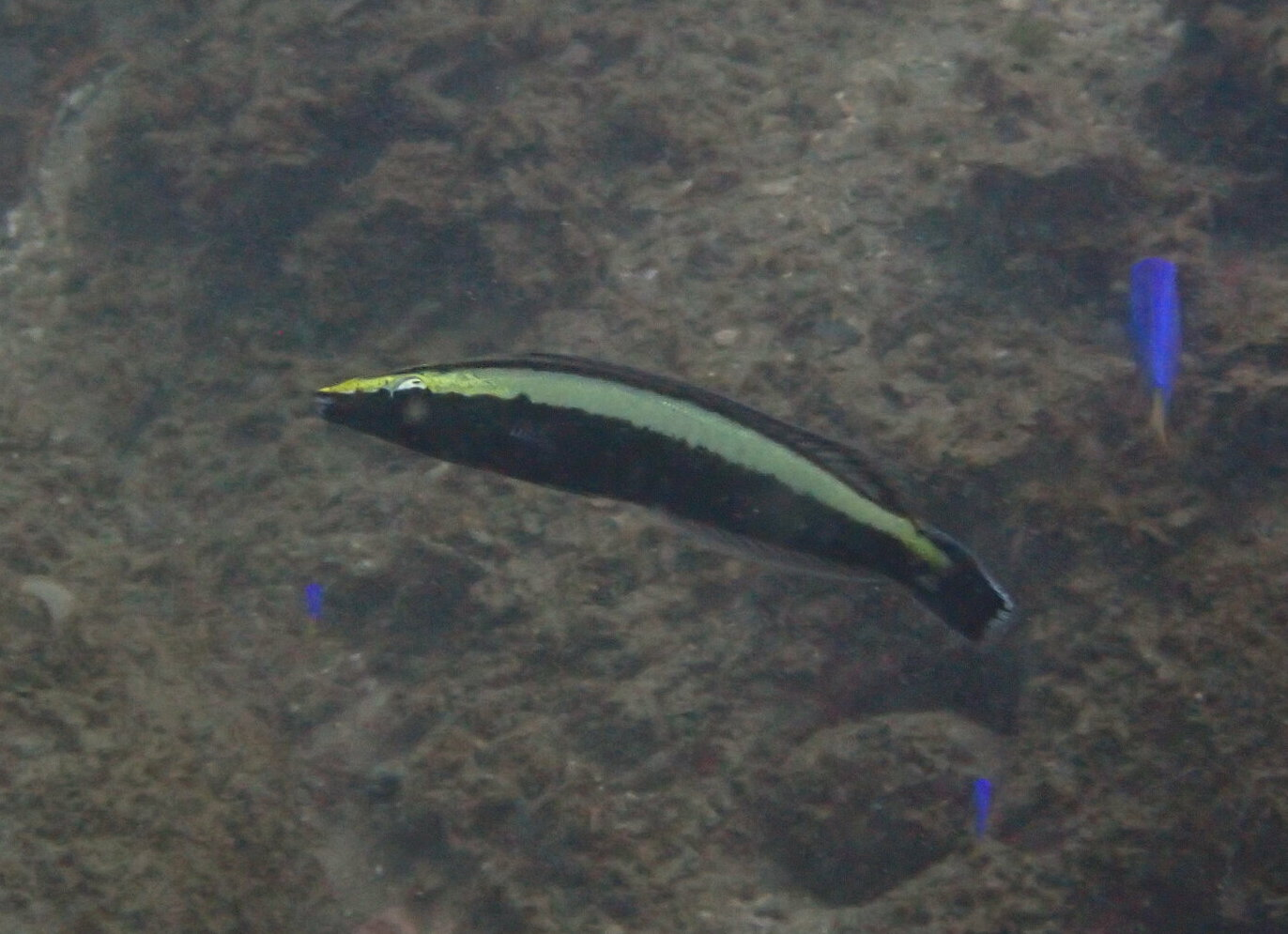
Young juvenile

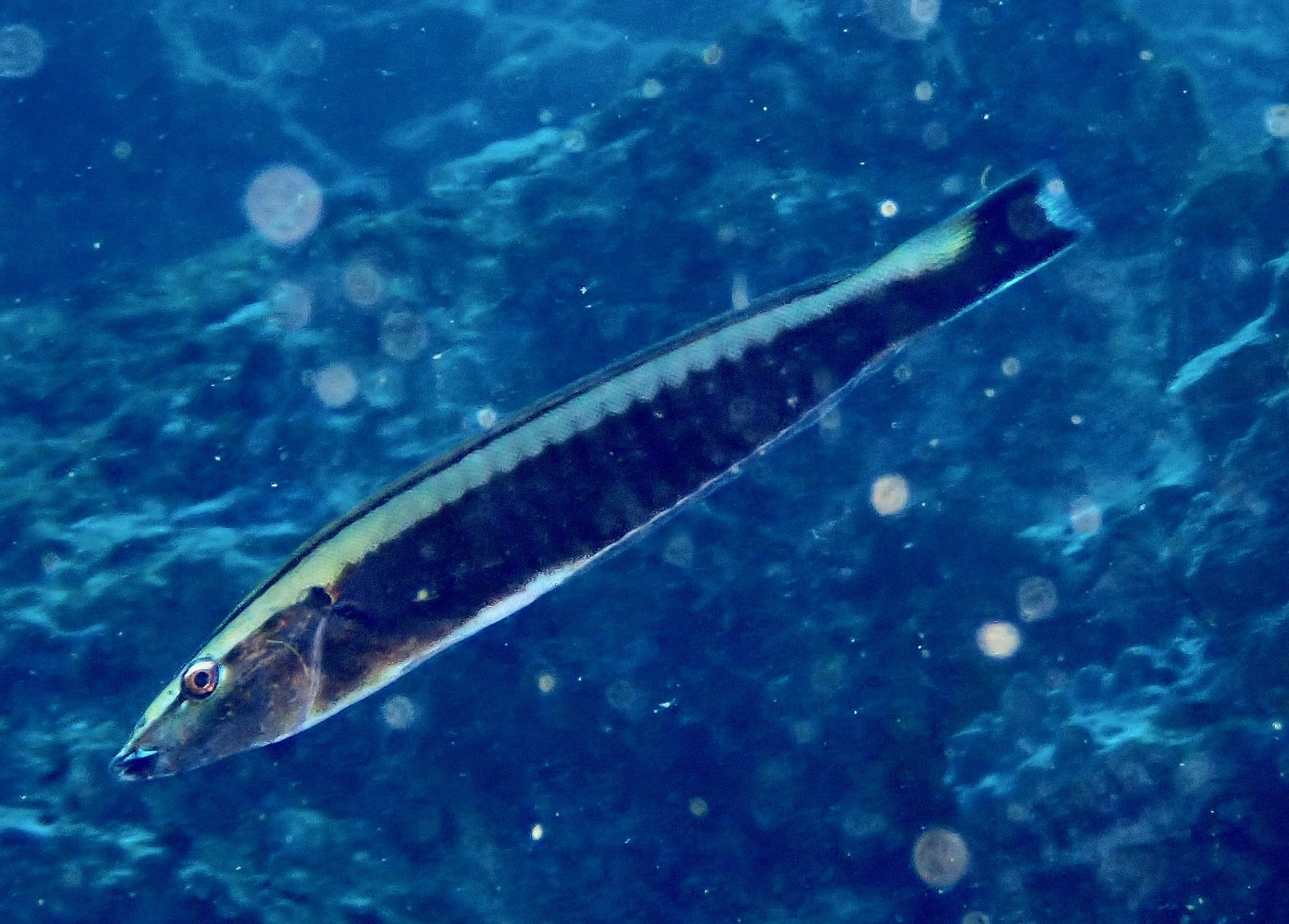
Older juvenile

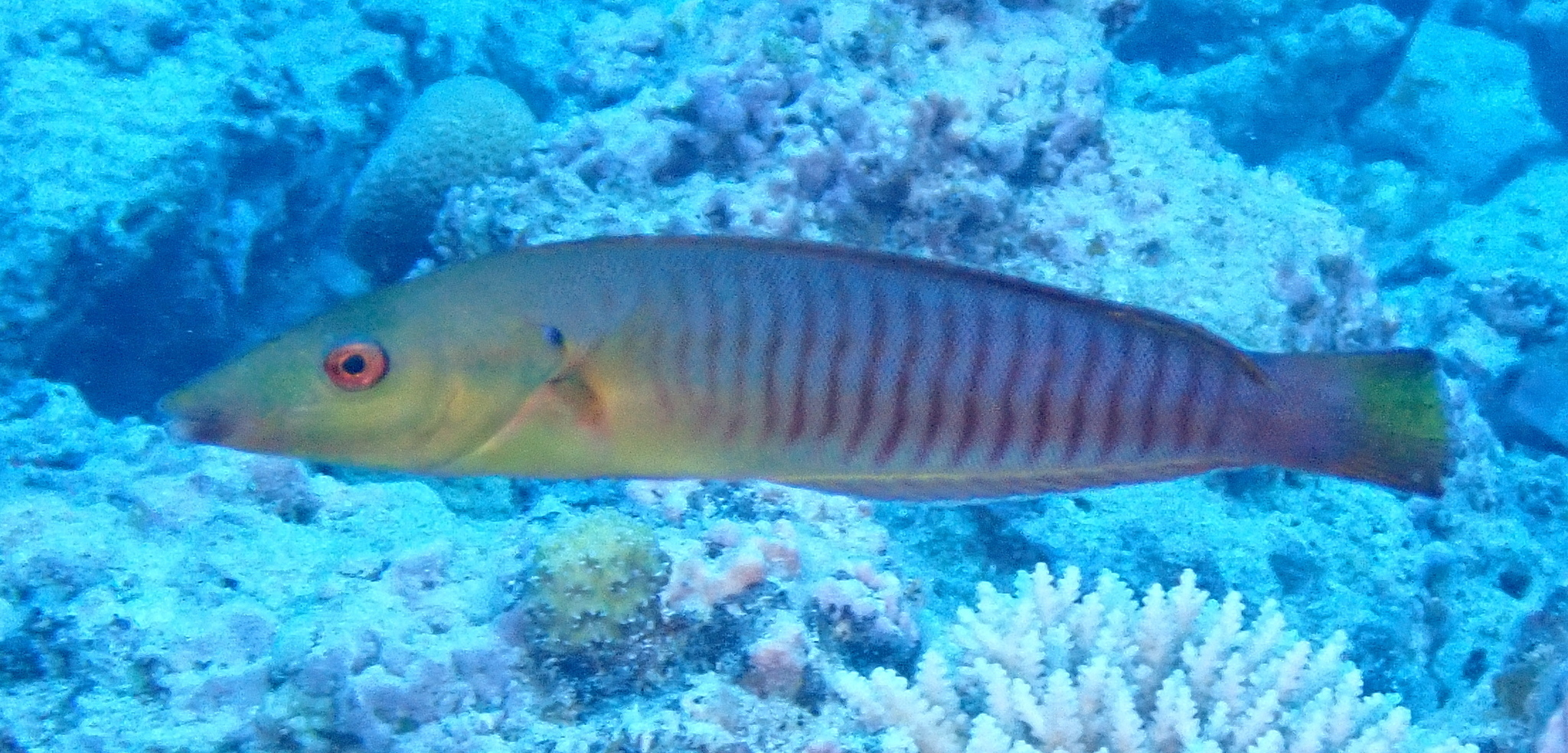
Initial phase

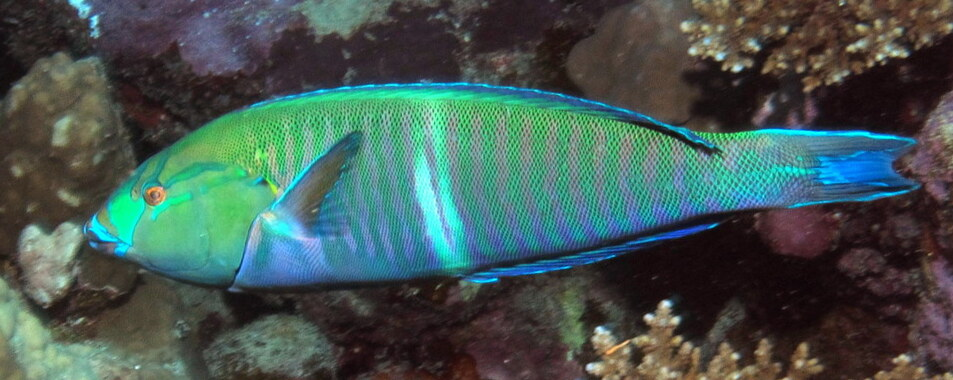
Terminal phase

== Habitat and biology ==
Hologymnosus annulatus occurs on coral reefs and areas of rocky substrate down to at least 30 metres (98 ft) on offshore reef slopes. The juveniles are normally solitary. It is a carnivore and its diet is mainly made up of small fishes, although it also eats crustaceans. The juvelime fish frequent the bottom of the water column while the adults will swim relatively high in the water. They are pelagic spawners.

== Human usage ==
Hologymnosus annulatus is collected for the aquarium trade and is harvested by small scale subsistence fisheries.
