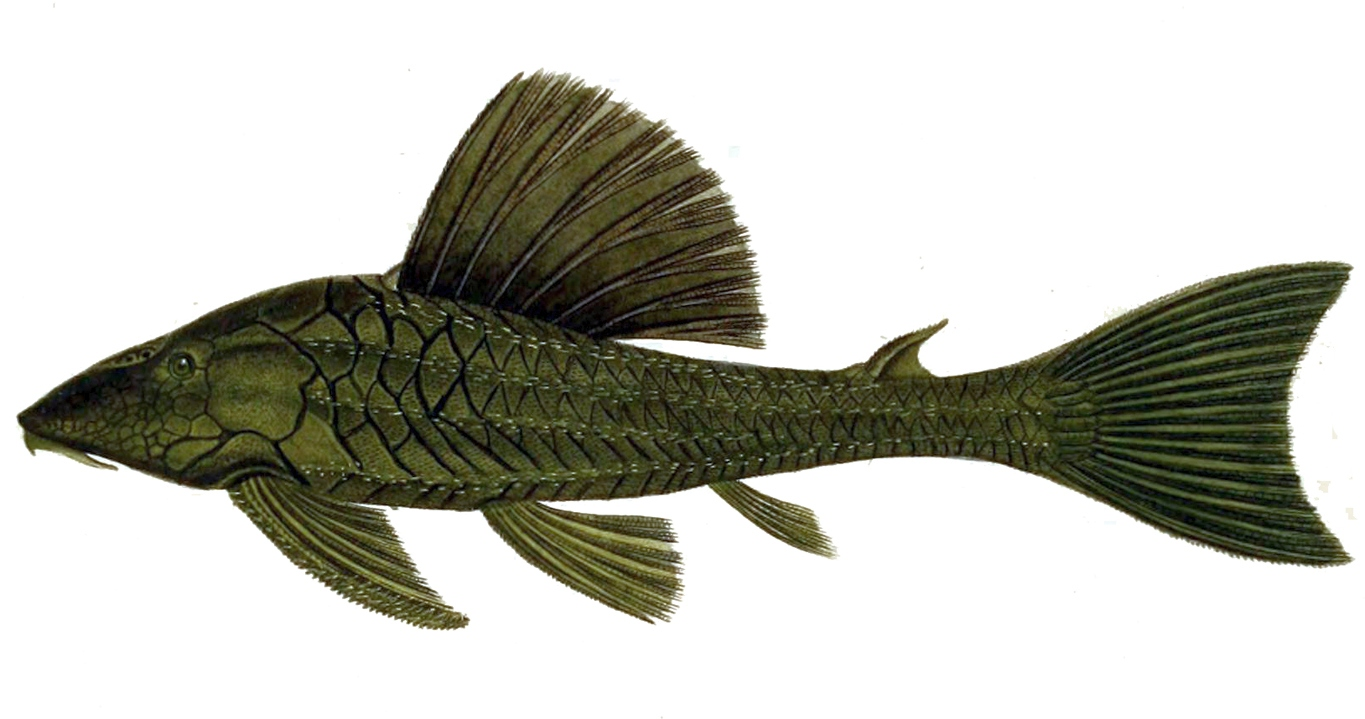

Conservation status
- Least Concern (IUCN 3.1)

Scientific classification
- Kingdom: Animalia
- Phylum: Chordata
- Class: Actinopterygii
- Division: Teleostei
- Order: Siluriformes
- Family: Loricariidae
- Genus: Hypostomus
- Species: H. commersoni

Binomial name
- Hypostomus commersoni Valenciennes, 1836

= Hypostomus commersoni =

Species of fish

Hypostomus commersoni, Commerson's pleco or the red-finned uruguay, is a species of freshwater ray-finned fish belonging to the family Loricariidae, the suckermouth armored catfishes, and the subfamily Hypostominae, the suckermouth catfishes. This catfish occurs in the Paraná River drainage, including the Iguazu River, the Paraguay River, the Río de la Plata, and the Dulce River. It spread into the upper Paraná following the inundation of the SeteQuedas Falls. It is typically found in rivers with muddy substrates and moderate currents. The water that H. commersoni inhabits usually has a temperature of 16.8 to 27.8 °C (62.2 to 82.0 °F), a pH of 7.2 to 9.2, a turbidity of 23.7 to 442 NTU, an oxygen concentration of 6.1 to 9.1 mg/L, and a conductivity of 1.087 to 2.654 μS/cm.

H. commersoni reaches 60.5 cm (23.8 in) in total length and can reportedly weigh at least 1.8 kg (4.0 lb). It appears in the aquarium trade, where it is often known as Commerson's pleco.

== Etymology ==
The fish is named in honor of French naturalist Philibert Commerçon, whose illustration of this fish was misidentified by Bernard Germain de Lacépède as H. plecostomus.
