= Poupartia pubescens =

Conservation status
- Endangered (IUCN 2.3)

Scientific classification
- Kingdom: Plantae
- Clade: Tracheophytes
- Clade: Angiosperms
- Clade: Eudicots
- Clade: Rosids
- Order: Sapindales
- Family: Anacardiaceae
- Genus: Poupartia
- Species: P. pubescens

Binomial name
- Poupartia pubescens Marchand

Species of flowering plant

Poupartia pubescens is a species of plant in the family Anacardiaceae. It is endemic to Mauritius. It is threatened by habitat loss.
