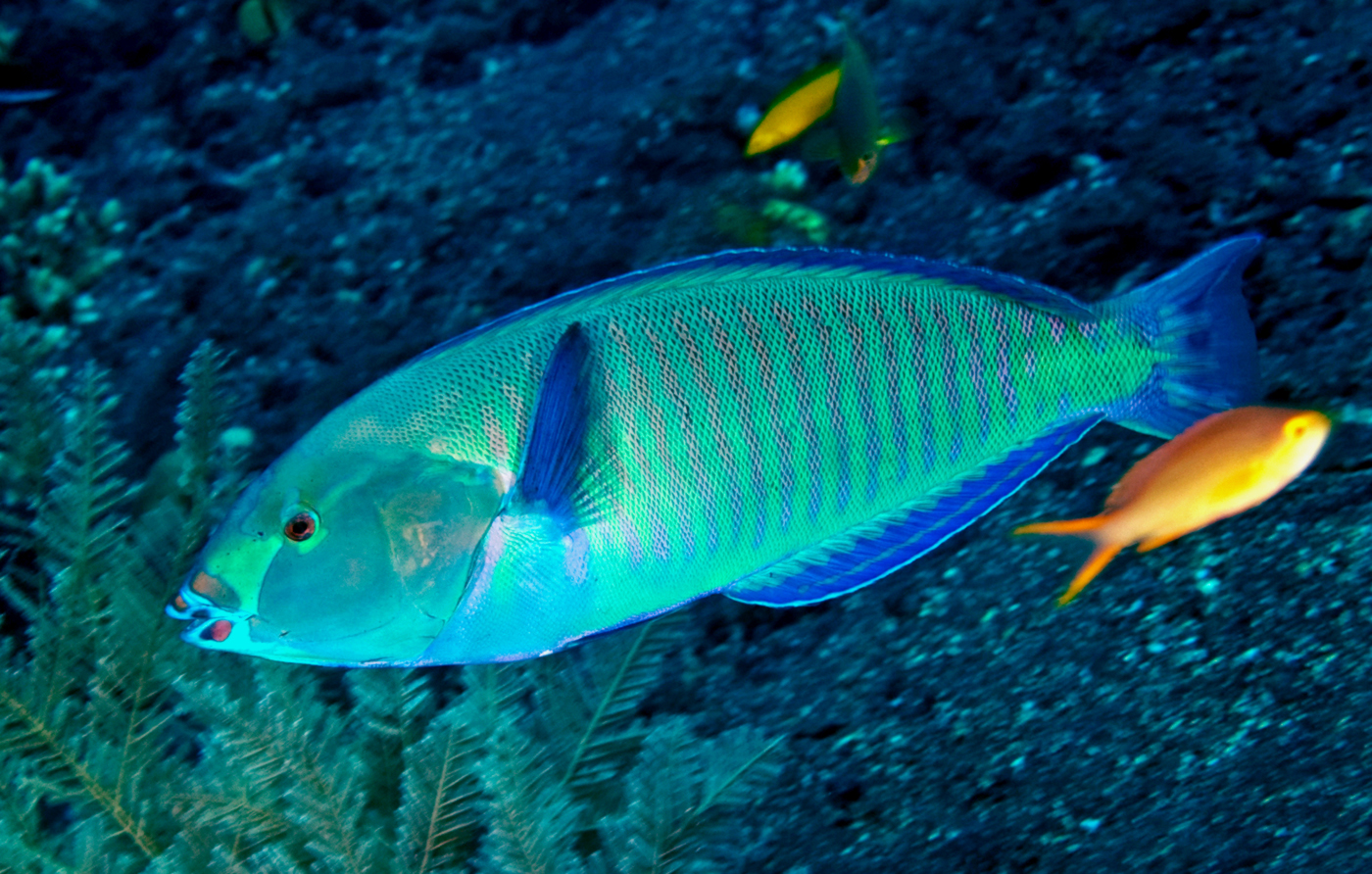
- Ring wrasse (H. annulatus)
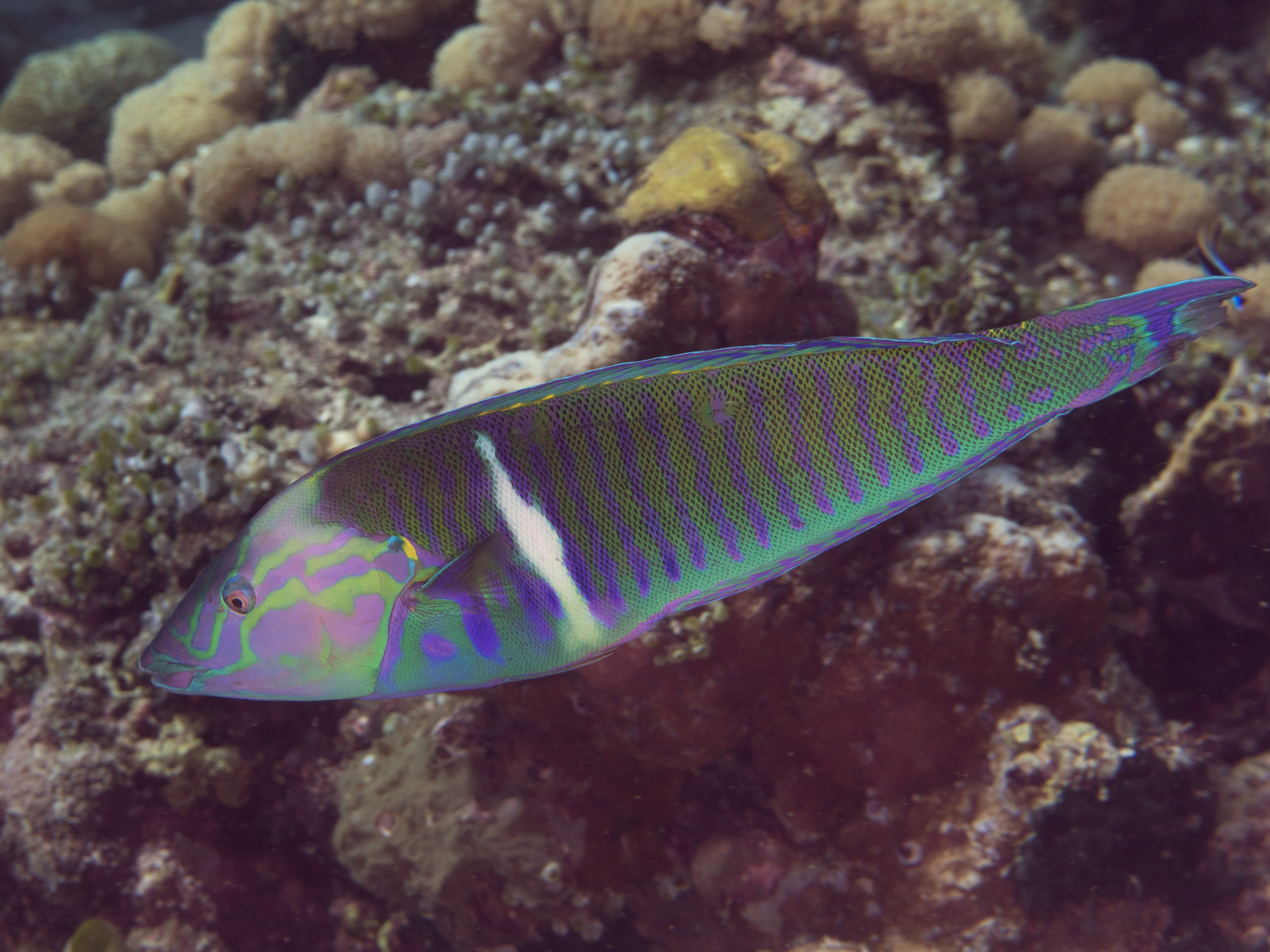
- Pastel ringwrasse (H. doliatus)

Scientific classification
- Kingdom: Animalia
- Phylum: Chordata
- Class: Actinopterygii
- Division: Teleostei
- Order: Labriformes
- Family: Labridae
- Subfamily: Julidinae
- Genus: Hologymnosus; Lacépède, 1801

Type species
- Hologymnosus fasciatus Lacépède, 1801

= Hologymnosus =

Genus of fishes

Hologymnosus is a genus of wrasses native to the Indian Ocean and the western Pacific Ocean.

== Species ==
The currently recognized species in this genus are:

- Hologymnosus annulatus (Lacépède, 1801) (ring wrasse)
- Hologymnosus doliatus (Lacépède, 1801) (pastel ringwrasse)
- Hologymnosus longipes (Günther, 1862) (sidespot longface wrasse)
- Hologymnosus rhodonotus J. E. Randall & Yamakawa, 1988 (redback longface wrasse)
