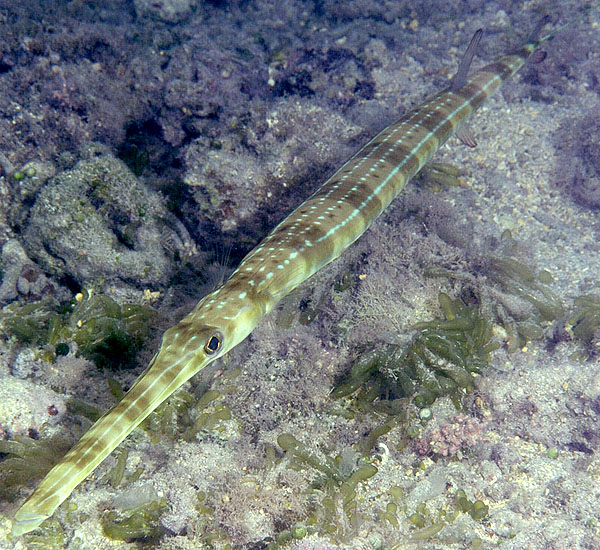
- Fistularia commersonii

Scientific classification
- Kingdom: Animalia
- Phylum: Chordata
- Class: Actinopterygii
- Division: Teleostei
- Order: Syngnathiformes
- Suborder: Syngnathoidei
- Superfamily: Aulostomoidea
- Family: Fistulariidae; Stark, 1828
- Genus: Fistularia; Linnaeus, 1758

Type species
- Fistularia tabacaria Linnaeus, 1758

Species
- See text.

Synonyms
- Cannorynchus Cantor, 1849; Flagellaria Gronow, 1854; Solenostomus Gill, 1861

= Cornetfish =

Cornetfish Temporal range: 33–0 Ma Early Oligocene to Present

Family of fishes

The cornetfishes or flutemouths are a small family, the Fistulariidae, of extremely elongated fish in the order Syngnathiformes. The family consists of a single genus, Fistularia, with four species, found worldwide in tropical and subtropical marine environments.

Ranging up to 2 m (6.6 ft) in length, cornetfishes are as thin and elongated as many eels, but are distinguished by very long snouts, distinct dorsal and anal fins, and forked caudal fins whose center rays form a lengthy filament. The lateral line is well-developed and extends onto the caudal filament.

Cornetfish are found in tropical and temperate marine waters around the world, in the Atlantic, Pacific, and Indian oceans. They are often found in coastal waters over soft-bottomed areas like coral reefs, sand flats, and seagrass beds, where they feed on small fishes, crustaceans, and other invertebrates.

Cornetfish are of minor interest for fishing, and can be found in local markets within their range.

== Species ==
Currently, four recognized species are placed in this genus:

- Fistularia commersonii Rüppell, 1838 (blue-spotted or smooth cornetfish)
- Fistularia corneta C. H. Gilbert & Starks, 1904 (Pacific cornetfish)
- Fistularia petimba Lacépède, 1803 (red cornetfish)
- Fistularia tabacaria Linnaeus, 1758 (cornetfish or blue-spotted cornetfish)

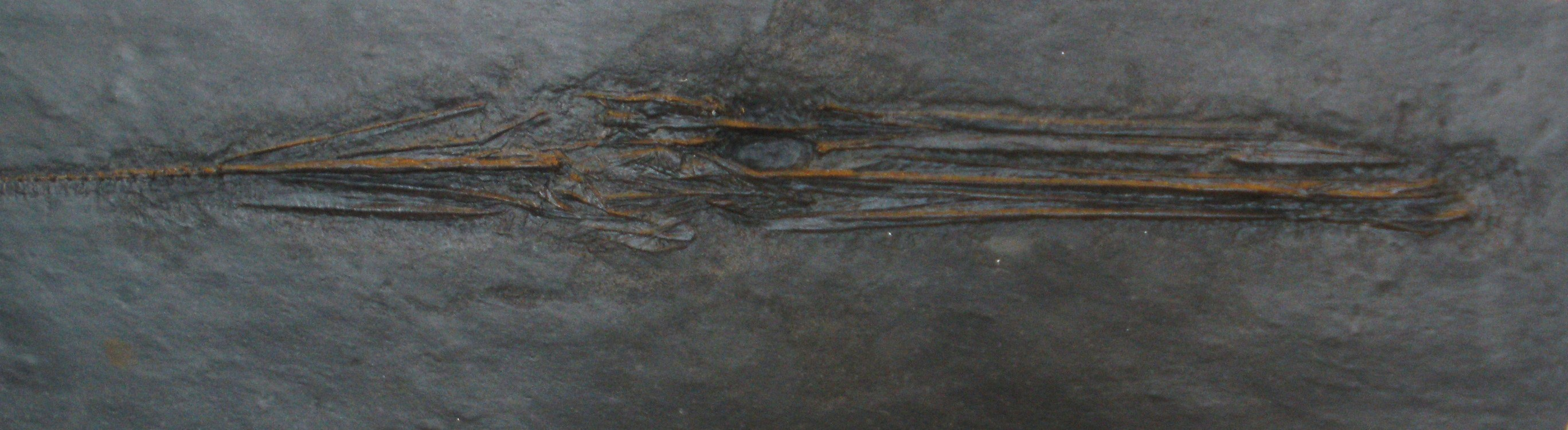
Fossil skull of F. koenigii from the Oligocene of Switzerland

The following fossil species are also known:

- †Fistularia contermina Daniltshenko, 1960 - Oligocene of North Caucasus, Russia
- †Fistularia licatae Sauvage, 1880 - Miocene of Italy
- †Fistularia koenigii Agassiz, 1839 - Oligocene of Switzerland

The species F. longirostris was formerly placed in this genus, but is now placed in Parasynarcualis.
