= Scribbled rabbitfish =

Scribbled rabbitfish is a common name for different rabbitfish species, including:

- Siganus spinus
- Siganus doliatus
