= Blackeye rabbitfish =

Conservation status
- Least Concern (IUCN 3.1)

Scientific classification
- Kingdom: Animalia
- Phylum: Chordata
- Class: Actinopterygii
- Order: Acanthuriformes
- Family: Siganidae
- Genus: Siganus
- Species: S. puelloides

Binomial name
- Siganus puelloides Woodland & Randall 1979

Species of fish

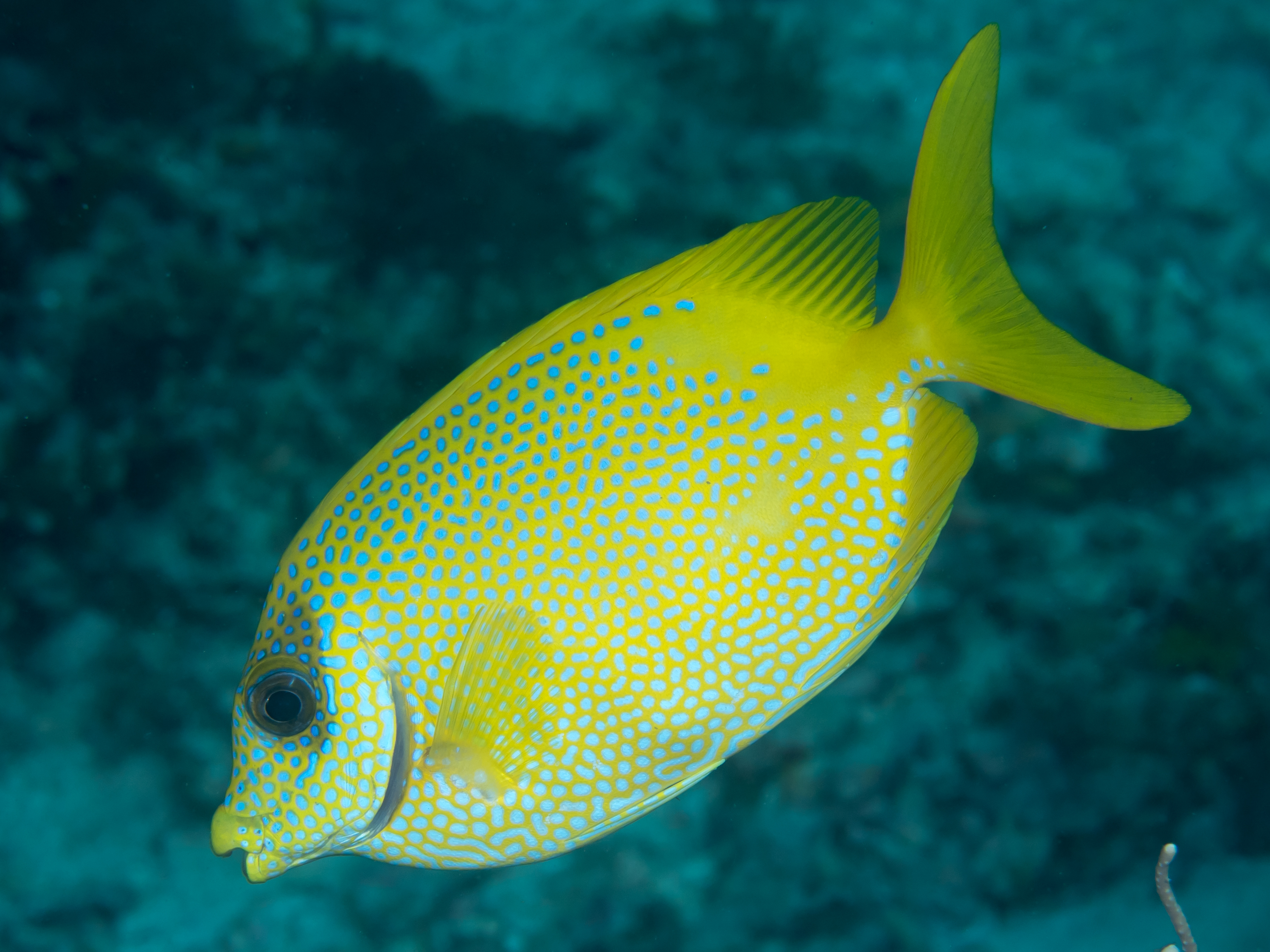
a Blackeye rabbitfish

The blackeye rabbitfish (Siganus puelloides) is a species of marine ray-finned fish, a rabbitfish belonging to the family Siganidae. It is found in the Indian Ocean.

== Taxonomy ==
The blackeye rabbitfish was first formally described in 1979 by the ichthyologists David J. Woodland and John E. Randall with the type locality given as Vilingili Island, part of Male Atoll in the Maldives. The specific name puelloides refers to its similarity to its Pacific Ocean congener the masked spinefoot (S. puellus).

== Description ==
The blackeye rabbitfish has 13 spines and 10 soft rays in the dorsal fin while the anal fin has 7 spines and 9 soft rays. There is a forward pointing spine which is embedded in the nape. It has a deeply forked caudal fin. This species attains a maximum total length of 31 cm (12 in). The colour is light blue on the upper body and silvery on the lower body. The head body and the caudal peduncle are covered in yellow spots, those on the upper body are round but on the lower body they merge into lines. There is a brown band that runs across the chin.

== Distribution and habitat ==
The blackeye rabbitfish is found in the tropical Indian Ocean. It is found in the Seychelles, the Maldives, the Andaman Islands and the Andaman Sea coasts of Myanmar and Thailand. It occurs at depths between 1 and 20 m (3 ft 3 in and 65 ft 7 in) in coral reef lagoons and on outer reefs.

== Biology ==
The blackeye rabbitfish is normally encountered in pairs, although single individuals and schools have also been recorded. Unlike most other rabbitfish animal matter is important in their diet and they are known to feed on sessile colonial tunicates and sponges of the order Monaxonida, as well as benthic algae. This species produces venom in the spines of its fins. In a study of the venom of a congener it was found that rabbitfish venom was similar to the venom of stonefishes.

== Fisheries ==
The blackeye rabbitfish is sometimes caught by spear fishers and any caught may be sold fresh.
