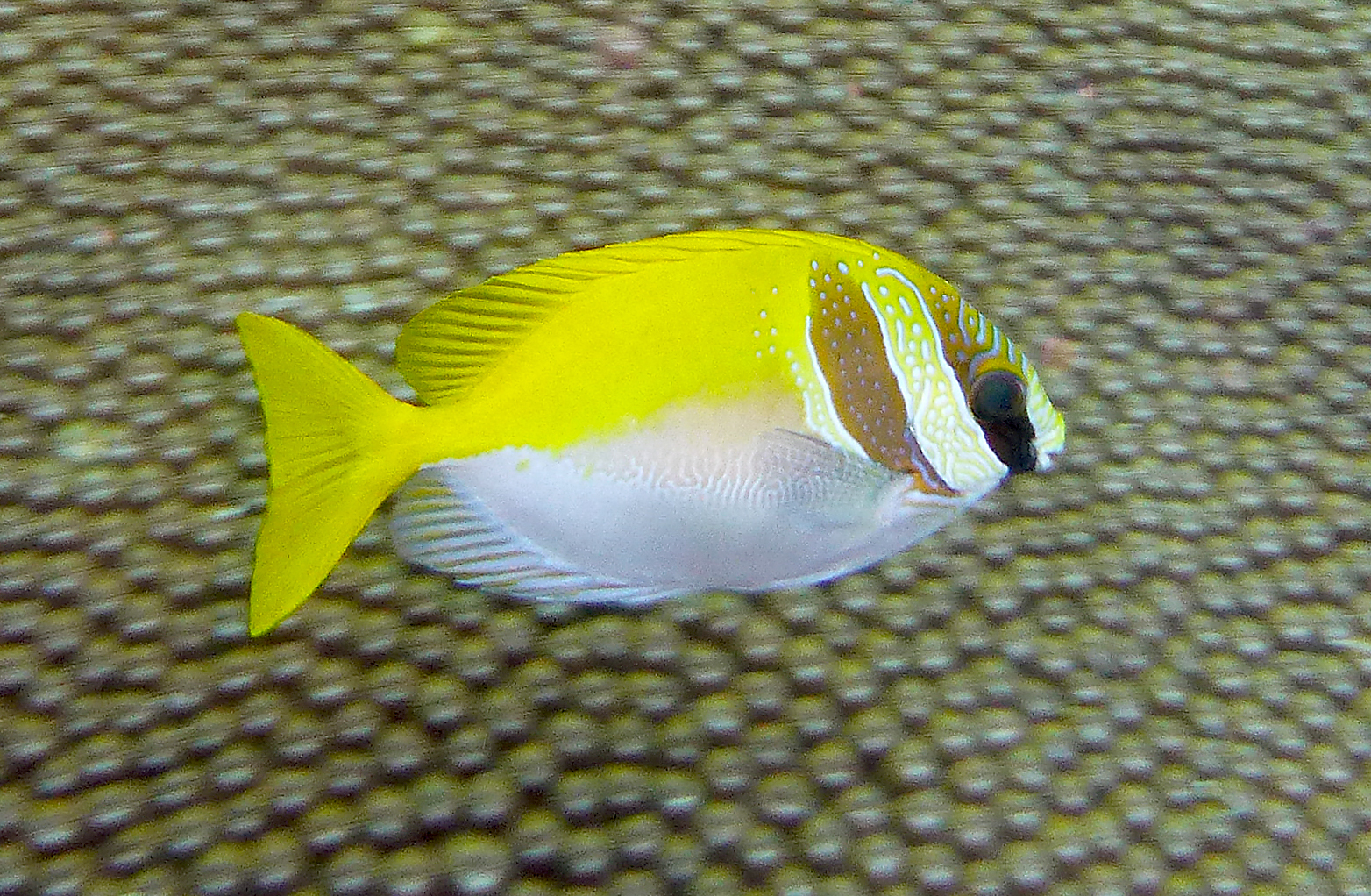

Conservation status
- Least Concern (IUCN 3.1)

Scientific classification
- Kingdom: Animalia
- Phylum: Chordata
- Class: Actinopterygii
- Order: Acanthuriformes
- Family: Siganidae
- Genus: Siganus
- Species: S. virgatus

Binomial name
- Siganus virgatus (Valenciennes, 1835)

Synonyms
- Amphacanthus virgatus Valenciennes, 1835; Teuthis virgata (Valenciennes, 1835); Amphacanthus notostictus Richardson, 1843; Siganus notostictus (Richardson, 1843); Teuthis notosticta (Richardson, 1843)

= Siganus virgatus =

Species of fish

Siganus virgatus, the barhead spinefoot, doublebar rabbitfish or doublebar spinefoot is a species of marine ray-finned fish, a rabbitfish belonging to the family Siganidae. It is found in the Indo-Pacific region.

== Taxonomy ==
Siganus virgatus was first formally described in 1835 as Amphacanthus virgatus by the French zoologist Achille Valenciennes with the type locality given as Java. The specific name virgatus was not explained by Valenciennes but it means "striped", this is presumed to be a reference to the two oblique brown bands on the front part of the body and head of this fish. Siganus virgatus is closely related to S. doliatus, with which it is apparently hybridized in the Indo-Malay region.

== Description ==
Siganus virgatus has a deep and laterally compressed body which has a depth which fits 1.8 to 2.3 times into its standard length. The dorsal profile of the head is bulging and the front nostril has a high flange, slightly higher and pointed to the rear. There is a recumbent spine to the front of the dorsal fin. Like all rabbitfishes, the dorsal fin has 13 spines and 10 soft rays while the anal fin has 7 spines and 9 soft rays. The fin spines hold venom glands. The caudal fin is emarginate in juveniles and slightly forked in adults. This species attains a maximum total length of 30 cm (12 in), although 20 cm (7.9 in) is more typical. The body of this species is pale with a silvery white belly. There are two wide diagonal dark bands on the head and the anterior part of body. The head and the front part of the body are marked with light bluish spots and lines. The caudal and dorsal fins are yellow and they normally have a yellow back and caudal peduncle.

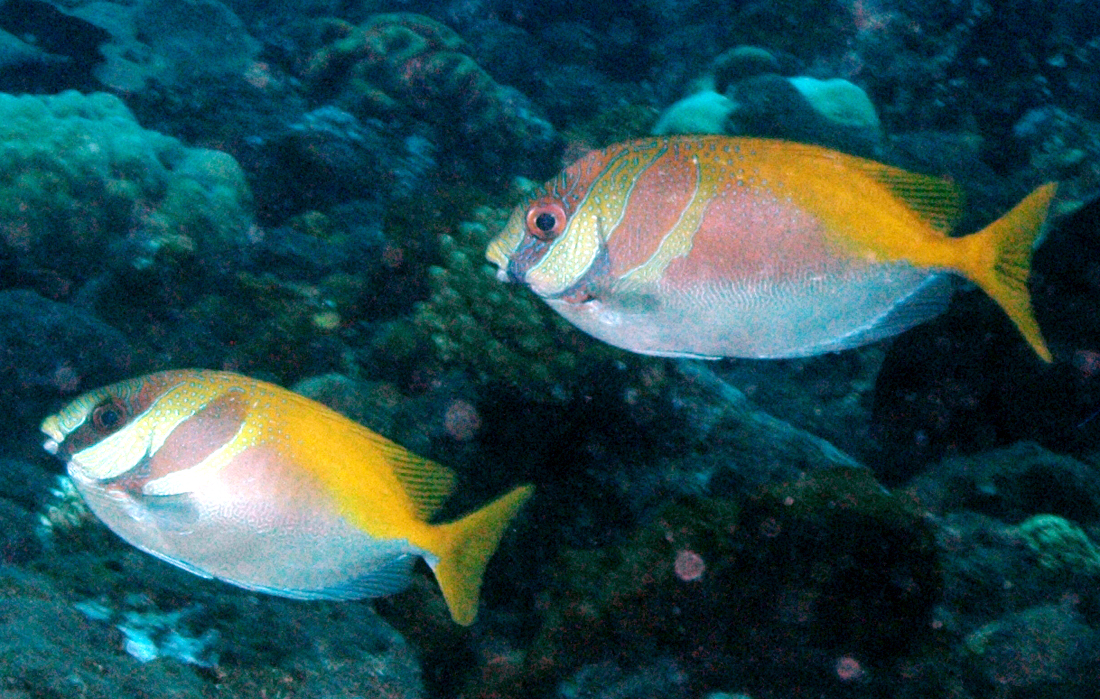
S. virgatus has dots and stripes in the upper half of the body, and the base of the yellow dorsal radiuis

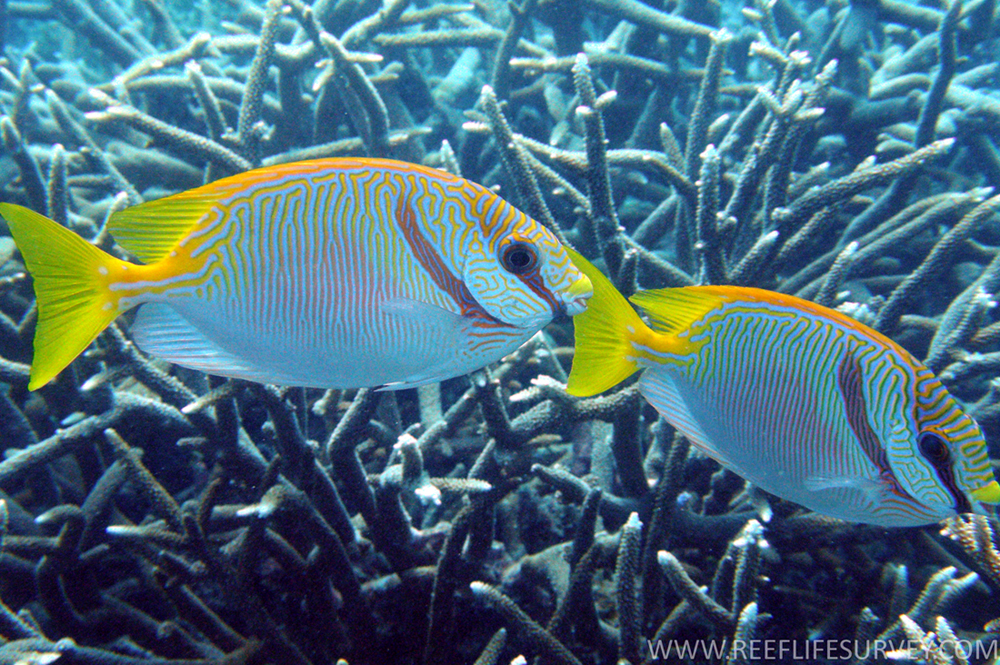
S. doliatus has stripes all over the body and no rear yellow spot

== Distribution and habitat ==
Siganus virgatus is found in the Indo-Pacific region from southern India and Sri Lanka eastwards to West Papua and Western Australia, north to the Ryukyu Islands. An individual was collected off the Adriatic island of Cres, but it thought that this is the result of deliberate introduction or transportation in ships ballast. In Australia they are found from the Ningaloo Reef and Kimberley region in Western Australia along the northern coast to the Wessell Islands of the Northern Territory. They inhabit in tropical waters, associated with coastal coral reefs, in lagoons and outer reefs. They frequent rocky and hard coral areas with patches of sand. They are tolerant of turbid waters. Large juveniles and adults occur in pairs on slopes of reefs and estuaries. Small juveniles inhabit mangroves, moving to reefs in small groups, protected by coral reefs. They are found at depths down to 12 m (39 ft).

== Biology ==
Siganus virgatus is oviparous and the eggs are fertilized externally, laying sticky eggs. Spawning occurs at dusk, in the hot months, coinciding with the lunar cycle, in the first quarter of the moon. They possess a planktonic larval state, and develop a post-larval state, characteristic of the suborder Acanthuroidei, called acronurus, in which the individuals are transparent, and they remain in pelagic state during an extended period before establishing in the definitive habitat, and adopt then the shape and color of adults. They are mainly herbivores, in 84% of their nourishment. They progress from feeding on phytoplankton and zooplankton, like larvae, to feeding on benthic macroalgae and small invertebrates.

They are diurnal. At night they sleep in cracks, developing a specific coloration of camouflage, in brown tones, and turning off their lively colors, in an exercise of crypsis, that also develop when they are stressed.
