= Black foxface =

Conservation status
- Vulnerable (IUCN 3.1)

Scientific classification
- Kingdom: Animalia
- Phylum: Chordata
- Class: Actinopterygii
- Order: Acanthuriformes
- Family: Siganidae
- Genus: Siganus
- Species: S. niger

Binomial name
- Siganus niger Woodland, 1990

Species of fish

The black foxface (Siganus niger) is a species of marine ray-finned fish, a rabbitfish belonging to the family Siganidae. It is endemic to Tonga in the western Pacific Ocean.

== Taxonomy ==
The black foxface was first formally described in 1990 by the ichthyologist David J. Woodland with the type locality given as Euakafa Island in the Vava'u Group of Tonga. This species is sometimes placed with the other four species of "foxfaced rabbitfishes" in a subgenus of the genus Siganus called Lo. The specific name niger means black, a reference to the dark colour of this species.

== Description ==
The black foxface, like almost all of the other rabbitfishes, has 13 spines and 10 soft rays in its dorsal fin and 7 spines and 9 soft rays in its anal fin. It grows to a total length of 22 cm (8.7 in). The overall colour is almost completely black but the pectoral fins are yellow as is the margin of the soft rayed part of the dorsal fin, the anal fin and the caudal fin. There is a broad white stripe on the gill cover which is overlain with a vermiculated pattern.

== Distribution and habitat ==
The black foxface is endemic to Tonga in the Western Pacific Ocean, although it is only common in the northernmost Tongan island group of Vava'u. It is found at depths between 2 and 15 m (6 ft 7 in and 49 ft 3 in) in the visvinity of drop offs at the edges of coral reefs. This species shows a preference for areas where there are staghorn or fire corals, and where there rubble mounds made up of flat and staghorn corals.

== Biology ==
The black foxface lives in pairs as adults, the juveniles are thought to school. It feeds on macroalgae. They are known to change colour and pattern when alarmed. This species produces venom in the spines of its fins. In a study of the venom of a congener it was found that rabbitfish venom was similar to the venom of stonefishes.

== Utilisation ==
The black foxface appears in the aquarium trade. It is also targeted by spear fishers and the catch is sold fresh.
