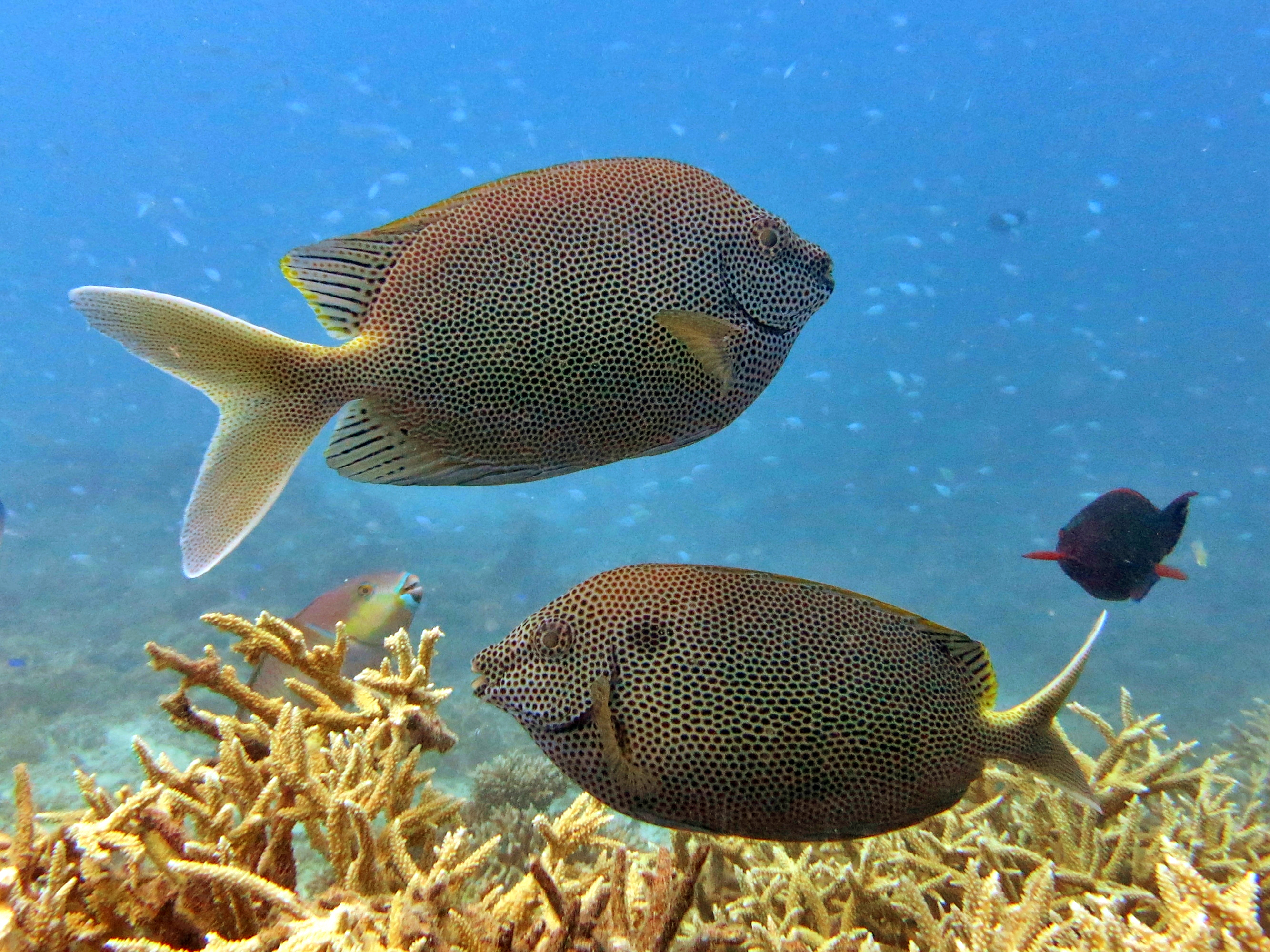

Conservation status
- Least Concern (IUCN 3.1)

Scientific classification
- Kingdom: Animalia
- Phylum: Chordata
- Class: Actinopterygii
- Order: Acanthuriformes
- Family: Siganidae
- Genus: Siganus
- Species: S. stellatus

Binomial name
- Siganus stellatus (Forsskål, 1775)

Synonyms
- Scarus stellatus Forsskål, 1775; Amphacanthus stellatus (Forsskål, 1775); Teuthis stellata (Forsskål, 1775); Amphacanthus nuchalis Valenciennes, 1835; Siganus laqueus von Bonde, 1934

= Siganus stellatus =

Species of fish

Siganus stellatus, the brown-spotted spinefoot, brown-spotted rabbitfish, honeycomb rabbitfish, starspotted spinefoot, starspotted rabbitfish or stellate rabbitfish is a species of marine ray-finned fish, a rabbitfish belonging to the family Siganidae. It is found in the Indo-Pacific region.

== Taxonomy ==
Siganus stellatus was first formally described in 1775 as Scarus stellatus by the Swedish-speaking Finnish explorer and naturalist Peter Forsskål with the type locality given as Jeddah in modern Saudi Arabia. Forsskål's description was published posthumously by Carsten Niebuhr, a fellow member and only survivor of the Danish Arabia expedition (1761–67), in his Descriptiones animalium avium, amphibiorum, piscium, insectorum, vermium; quae in itinere orientali observavit Petrus Forskål. Post mortem auctoris edidit Carsten Niebuhr. The specific name stellatus means "covered with stars", and this is thought to be a reference to the small, closely set, dark brown to black hexagonal spots which cover the body and the caudal fin.

=== Subspecies ===
According to FishBase, Siganus stellatus has two recognised subspecies:

- Siganus stellatus stellatus (Forsskål, 1775) - Red Sea, Indian Ocean and Western Pacific Ocean
- Siganus stellatus laqueus von Bonde, 1934 - Red Sea and Indian Ocean

Other authorities consider S. s. laqueus to be a separate species; if accepted, its name would be Siganus laqueus. This fish was first formally described in 1934 by the South African zoologist, fisheries scientist and oceanographer Cecil von Bonde with its type locality given as the west coast of Zanzibar. The specific name laqueus means "trap" or "snare", and this reference can also be found the name of this fish in Swahili: chafi uzia, which means "fish trap". The name is derived from the fact that it is often caught using fish traps.

== Description ==
Siganus stellatus has a deep and laterally compressed body whose depth is 2 to 2.3 times of its standard length. The dorsal profile of the head is almost a straight line and has an angle of around 45° between the forehead and the snout while the ventral profile of the head has a slight indentation under the chin. In juveniles, the front nostril has a long triangular flap, but this is reduced to a low rim in adults. There is a recumbent spine to the front of the dorsal fin. Like all rabbitfishes, the dorsal fin has 13 spines and 10 soft rays while the anal fin has 7 spines and 9 soft rays. The fin spines hold venom glands. The caudal fin is emarginate but slowly becomes deeply forked as the fish grows. This species attains a maximum total length of 40 cm (16 in), although 35 cm (14 in) is more typical. The body is covered in small and closely set dark brown to black spots on a white background, creating a honeycomb pattern. There are black spots on the fins while the caudal fin and the rear edges of dorsal and anal fins have a whitish margin. They frequently show a light, whitish to yellowish saddle mark on the caudal peduncle. In the subspecies S. s. laqueus, the background colour of the body is greyish green with the head and the body covered with dark brown spots.

== Distribution and habitat ==
Siganus stellatus is found from the Red Sea and through the Indian Ocean (where it can be found as south as South Africa) into the Pacific Ocean where it reaches Singapore. In Australia, it is known only from the Cocos (Keeling) Islands. It can be found seagrass beds, seaward reefs and lagoons at depths between 1 and 30 m (3 ft 3 in and 98 ft 5 in). Juveniles are known to enter weedy estuarine habitats.

== Biology ==
Siganus stellatus grazes on benthic macroalgae. The adults live in pairs while subadults and juveniles form schools. There appears to be some seasonality in the breeding with sudden peaks of numbers of juveniles occurring during summer. This species produces venom in the spines of its fins. In a study of the venom of a congener it was found that rabbitfish venom was similar to the venom of stonefishes.

== Fisheries ==
Siganus stellatus is caught with fish traps in Kenya and Tanzania and with spears throughout its range.
