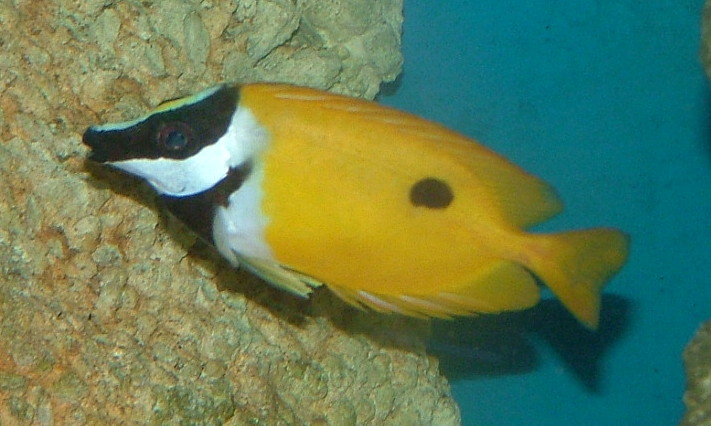

Conservation status
- Data Deficient (IUCN 3.1)

Scientific classification
- Kingdom: Animalia
- Phylum: Chordata
- Class: Actinopterygii
- Order: Acanthuriformes
- Family: Siganidae
- Genus: Siganus
- Species: S. unimaculatus

Binomial name
- Siganus unimaculatus (Evermann & Seale, 1907)

Synonyms
- Lo unimaculatus Evermann & Seale, 1907

= Blotched foxface =

Species of ray-finned fish

The blotched foxface (Siganus unimaculatus), also called the blackblotch foxface or one-spot foxface, is a species of marine ray-finned fish, a rabbitfish belonging to the family Siganidae. It is found at reefs and lagoons in the central Indo-Pacific. Except for the black spot on the rear upper body, it resembles the closely related foxface rabbitfish.

== Taxonomy ==
The blotched foxace was first formally described in 1907 as Lo unimaculatus by the American ichthyologists Barton Warren Evermann and Alvin Seale with the type locality given as "Bacon, Sorsogon, east coast of southern Luzon Island, Philippines". This species differs from the foxface rabbitfish (S. vulpinus) in possessing a large black spot below the soft-rayed part of the dorsal fin. It is sympatric and not phylogenetically distinct, and though these two might be recently evolved species, they may be just colour morphs and should arguably to be united under the scientific name S. vulpinus. The specific name is a compound of uni which means "one" and maculatus meaning "spotted", a reference to the characteristic black spot.

== Description ==
The blotched foxface has a compressed body which has a depth which fits into its standard length 1.9 times. The dorsal profile of the head is steep to the rearof the eye and there is an indentation between the eyes. The caudal fin is forked. Like all rabbitfishes, the dorsal fin has 13 spines and 10 soft rays while the anal fin has 7 spines and 9 soft rays. The fin spines hold venom glands. This species attains a maximum total length of 20 cm (7.9 in). This species is bright yellow with the head and front part of the body being white with a black band running from the mouth to the start of the dorsal fin and another black band extending from the shoulder to the chest. There is an irregular black spot or blotch on the centre to rear of the upper flanks.

== Distribution and habitat ==
The blotched foxface has two disjunct populations: a northern population which is found in the Western Pacific Ocean from the Ryukyu and Ogasawara Islands of Japan to the Philippines, and a southern population which is restricted to the Rowley Shoals in the Timor Sea off northwestern Australia. This species is found in shallow waters down to 14 m (46 ft) on coral reefs made up of Acropora and Porites, and also on coral rubble.

== Biology ==
The blotched foxface is herbivorous and feeds on seaweeds. Adults an subadults live in pairs, including same-sex pairs; the adult pairs seem to be permanent. Reproduction appears to takes place at the new moon when large aggregations occur and the demersal eggs are laid. Juveniles may gather in large schools. This species produces venom in the spines of its fins. In a study of the venom of a congener it was found that rabbitfish venom was similar to the venom of stonefishes.

== Utilisation ==
The blotched foxface is targeted by fisheries using spearfishing and drive-in nets, the catch being sold for food. They also appear in the aquarium trade.
