= Siganus woodlandi =

Conservation status
- Least Concern (IUCN 3.1)

Scientific classification
- Kingdom: Animalia
- Phylum: Chordata
- Class: Actinopterygii
- Order: Acanthuriformes
- Family: Siganidae
- Genus: Siganus
- Species: S. woodlandi

Binomial name
- Siganus woodlandi Randall & Kulbicki, 2005

Species of fish

Siganus woodlandi is a species of marine ray-finned fish, a rabbitfish belonging to the family Siganidae. It is endemic to the waters off New Caledonia in the Western Pacific Ocean.

== Taxonomy ==
Siganus woodlandi was first formally described in 2005 by the ichthyologists John Ernest Randall & Michel Kulbicki with the type locality given as the fish market in Noumea in New Caledonia. The specific name honours the ichthyologist David J. Woodland of University of New England in New South Wales, Australia, in recognition of his research on the systematics of the family Siganidae.

== Description ==
Siganus woodlandi has a compressed body which has a depth which fits into its standard length 2.3 to 2.4 times. The dorsal profile of the head is concave with a procumbermt spine in the nape in front of the dorsal fin. The caudal fin is strongly emarginate. Like all rabbitfishes, the dorsal fin has 13 spines and 10 soft rays while the anal fin has 7 spines and 9 soft rays. The fin spines hold venom glands. This species attains a maximum total length of 25.2 cm (9.9 in). The head and body are pale blue in colour with numerous small pale yellowish spots and highly irregular narrow yellow bands, these create a fine reticulated pattern over much of the head and body.

== Distribution and habitat ==
Siganus woodlandi has been collected from depths between 5 and 15 m (16 and 49 ft) off New Caledonia, although similar fishes have been photographed off Bali in Indonesia and from the Scott Reef and Ashmore Reef in the Timor Sea, however these records need to be verified.

== Biology ==
Siganis woodlandi is found in schools of about 10 to 100 fishes. They feed mainly on benthic algae, but they seem to opportunistically feed on zooplankton too.

== Fisheries ==
Siganis woodlandi was described from a specimen obtained at a fish market, so it occasionally appears to be caught and sold as food.
