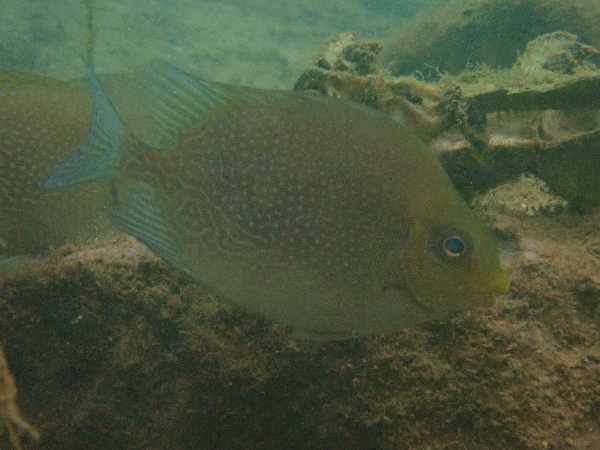

Conservation status
- Least Concern (IUCN 3.1)

Scientific classification
- Kingdom: Animalia
- Phylum: Chordata
- Class: Actinopterygii
- Order: Acanthuriformes
- Family: Siganidae
- Genus: Siganus
- Species: S. randalli

Binomial name
- Siganus randalli Woodland, 1990

= Siganus randalli =

Species of fish

Siganus randalli, the variegated spinefoot or Randall's rabbitfish, is a species of marine ray-finned fish, a rabbitfish belonging to the family Siganidae. It is found in the Western Pacific Ocean.

== Taxonomy ==
Siganus randalli was first formally described in 1990 by the ichthyologist David J. Woodland with the type locality given as a coral reef flat off Paruru Plantation in the Marau Lagoon on Guadalcanal Island in the Solomon Islands. The specific name honours the American ichthyologist John E. Randall of the Bishop Museum in Honolulu, Randall brought this species to Woodland's attention and gave him a lot of help with his revision of the genus Siganus.

== Description ==
Siganus randalli has a laterally compressed, deep body which has a depth which fits into its standard length between 2 and 2.2 times. The head has a dorsal profile which is indented above the eye while the snout is slightly concave. The front nostril has a peak on its rear edge. There is a recumbent spine to the front of the dorsal fin, it is imbedded in the nape. Like all rabbitfishes, the dorsal fin has 13 spines and 10 soft rays while the anal fin has 7 spines and 9 soft rays. The fin spines hold venom glands. The caudal fin is emarginate. This species attains a maximum total length of 33.5 cm (13.2 in), although 25 cm (9.8 in) is more typical. The overall colour is bronze, marked with pale blue spots on the head and front of the body. The spots are replaced by similar coloured serpentine lines on the rear part of the body the separation being a line running from the base of the last spine in the dorsal fin to base of first spine in the anal fin. The smallest spots are on the nape becoming bigger on the cheek and larger again on the mid flank with the spaces between the spots slightly shorter than their diameters. The spiny part of the dorsal fin is bronze and the soft part is bronze at the base and bluish towards the margin. The anal fin bronze with bluish tips to its soft rays. The caudal fin is blue with serpentine bronze markings which separate into spots and short lines on its outer half. The pectoral fins are hyaline with blue fin rays while the pelvic fins are bronze.

== Distribution and habitat ==
Siganus randalli is found in the West Pacific around Papua New Guinea and Solomon Islands north to Pohnpei, Kosrae, and Guam in the Marianas. It is found at depths between 1 and 15 m (3 ft 3 in and 49 ft 3 in). The adults occur in coral reefs where there is sand and coral rubble while juveniles inhabit mangroves.

== Biology ==
Siganus randalli occurs over areas of compacted pavement where they live in small schools of 10-20 individuals and feed on benthic algae. The juveniles form schools in mangroves. This species produces venom in the spines of its fins. In a study of the venom of a congener it was found that rabbitfish venom was similar to the venom of stonefishes.

== Fisheries ==
Siganus randalli is claimed to be landed, with other rabbitfishes, in small amounts in the Philippines, although this has to be confirmed as the Philippines are outside the known range of this species. Fijian tuna fisheries use this species as bait and it is caught with spearguns. In Guam this species is being researched for its potential in aquaculture.
