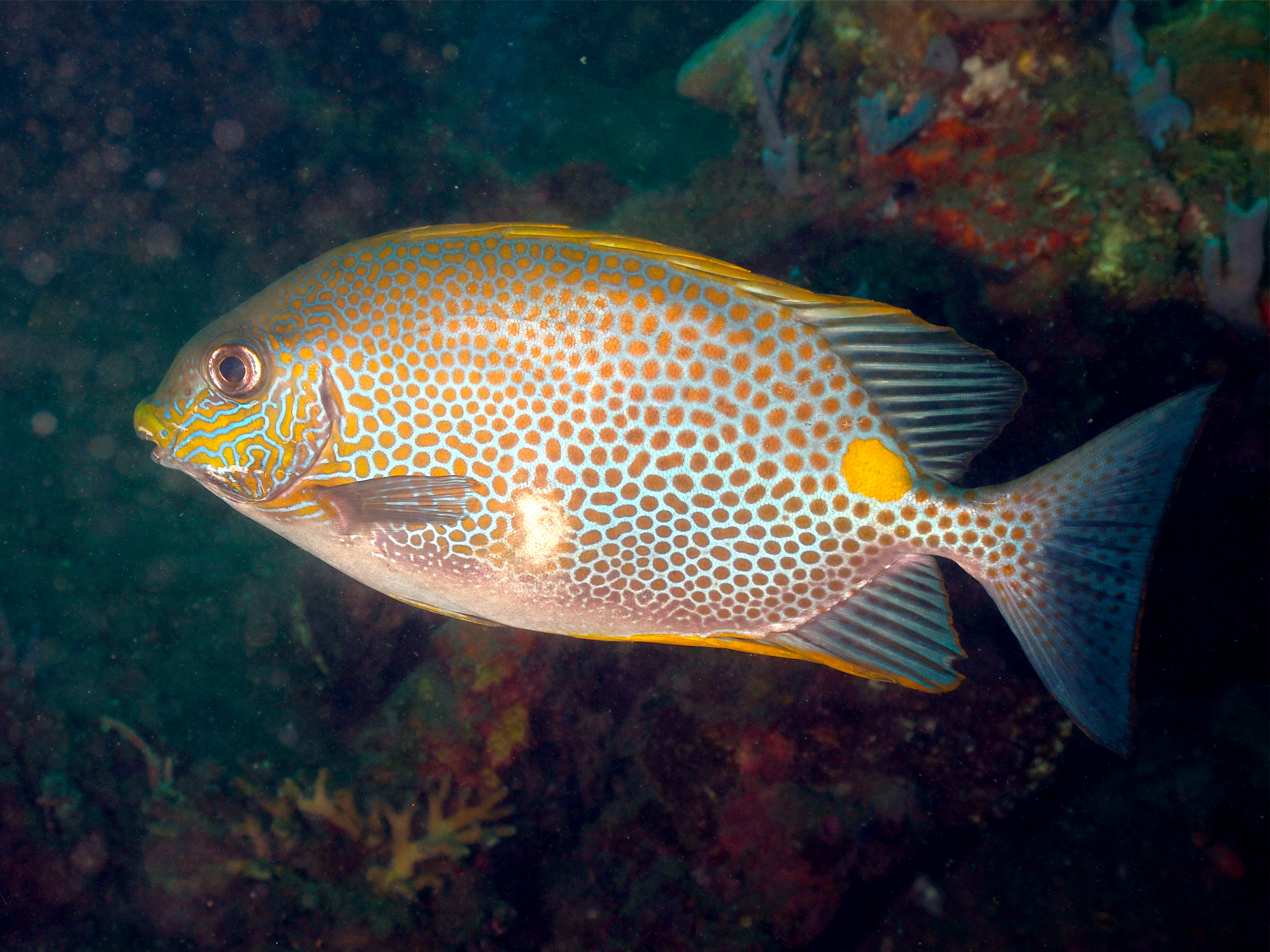

Conservation status
- Least Concern (IUCN 3.1)

Scientific classification
- Kingdom: Animalia
- Phylum: Chordata
- Class: Actinopterygii
- Order: Acanthuriformes
- Family: Siganidae
- Genus: Siganus
- Species: S. guttatus

Binomial name
- Siganus guttatus (Bloch, 1787)

Synonyms
- List: Chaetodon guttatus Bloch, 1787; Amphacanthus guttatus (Bloch, 1787); Teuthis guttata (Bloch, 1787); Amphacanthus concatenatus Valenciennes, 1835; Siganus concatenatus (Valenciennes, 1835); Teuthis concatenata (Valenciennes, 1835); Amphacanthus firmamentum Valenciennes, 1835

= Orange-spotted spinefoot =

Species of fish

The orange-spotted spinefoot (Siganus guttatus), also known as the deepbody spinefoot, gold-saddle rabbitfish, golden rabbitfish, golden-spotted spinefoot, goldlined spinefoot or yellowblotch spinefoot, is a species of marine ray-finned fish, a rabbitfish belonging to the family Siganidae. It is found in the eastern Indian Ocean and western Pacific Ocean. It occasionally makes its way into the aquarium trade.

== Taxonomy ==
The orange-spotted spinefoot was first formally described in 1787 as Chaetodon guttatus by the German physician and naturalist Marcus Elieser Bloch with the type locality given as the East Indies. The specific name guttatus means "spotted", a reference to the rusty spots on the flanks of this fish.

== Description ==
The orange-spotted spinefoot has a laterally compressed body which has a depth that is approximately half its standard length. The dorsal profile of the head is quite steep with a slight indentation to the front of the eyes. The front nostril has a slightly raised edge which is larger to the rear. There is a forward pointing spine in front of the dorsal fin which is imbedded in the nape. The dorsal fin has 13 spines and 10 soft rays while the anal fin has 7 spines and 9 soft rays. The caudal fin is emarginate, although it becomes moderately forked in the largest individuals. This species attains a maximum total length of 42 cm (17 in), although 25 cm (9.8 in) is more typical. The overall colour of the body is dusky blue above and silvery below with a single large yellow-orange spot below the soft-rayed part of the dorsal fin, near the caudal fin, and a number of smaller reddish-brown spots on the flanks.

== Distribution and habitat ==
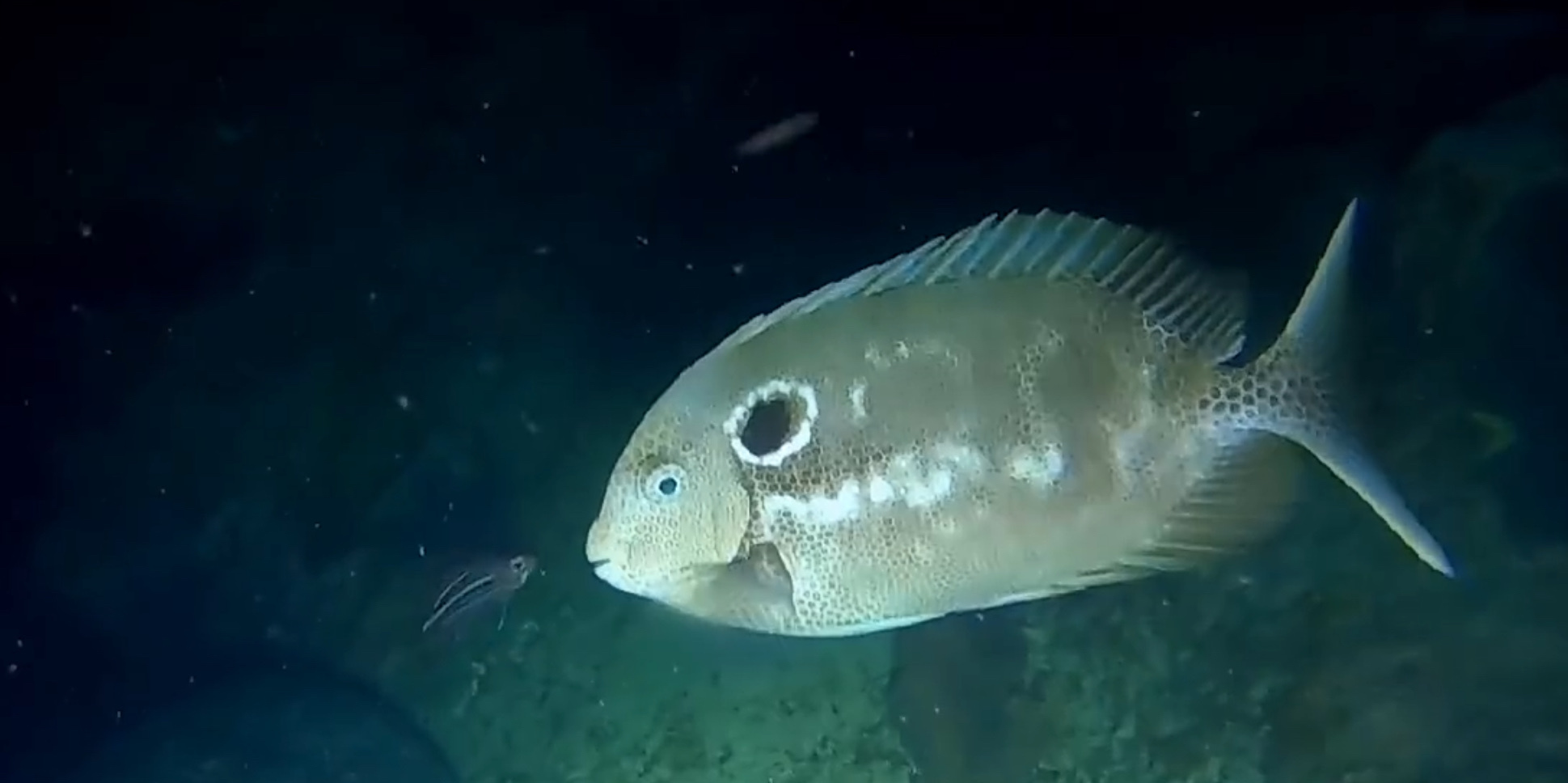
In the Celebes Sea

The orange-spotted spinefoot has a wide Indo-West Pacific range which extends from the Andaman Islands and the western coast of Peninsular Malaysia and Sumatra to West Papua, north as far as the southern Ryukyu Islands. It is uncommon in Palau and has been recorded from Yap. They are found to depths of 35 m (115 ft) in shallow coastal waters where they inhabit reefs and mangroves and can tolerate a wide variety of salinities.

== Biology ==
The orange-spotted spinefoot first settle as fry in beds of sea grass near the mouths of rivers, The adults enter and leave tidal river channels with the ebbing and flowing of the tide. Adults also occur on the drop-offs of coastal fringing reefs. This is a schooling species and adults form schools of between 10 and 15 fishes. Their diet is mainly benthic algae. Unusually for a rabbitfish, the orange-spotted spinefoot may be active at night. Spawning normally takes place at night too, around midnight.

=== Venom ===
The orange-spotted spinefoot has grooves in the spines of the dorsal, anal and pelvic fins which contain venom glands. The wound caused by these spines may be relatively painful to humans, but is usually not dangerous. The spines are used in self-defence. In a study of the venom of a congener it was found that rabbitfish venom was similar to the venom of stonefishes.

== Utilisation ==
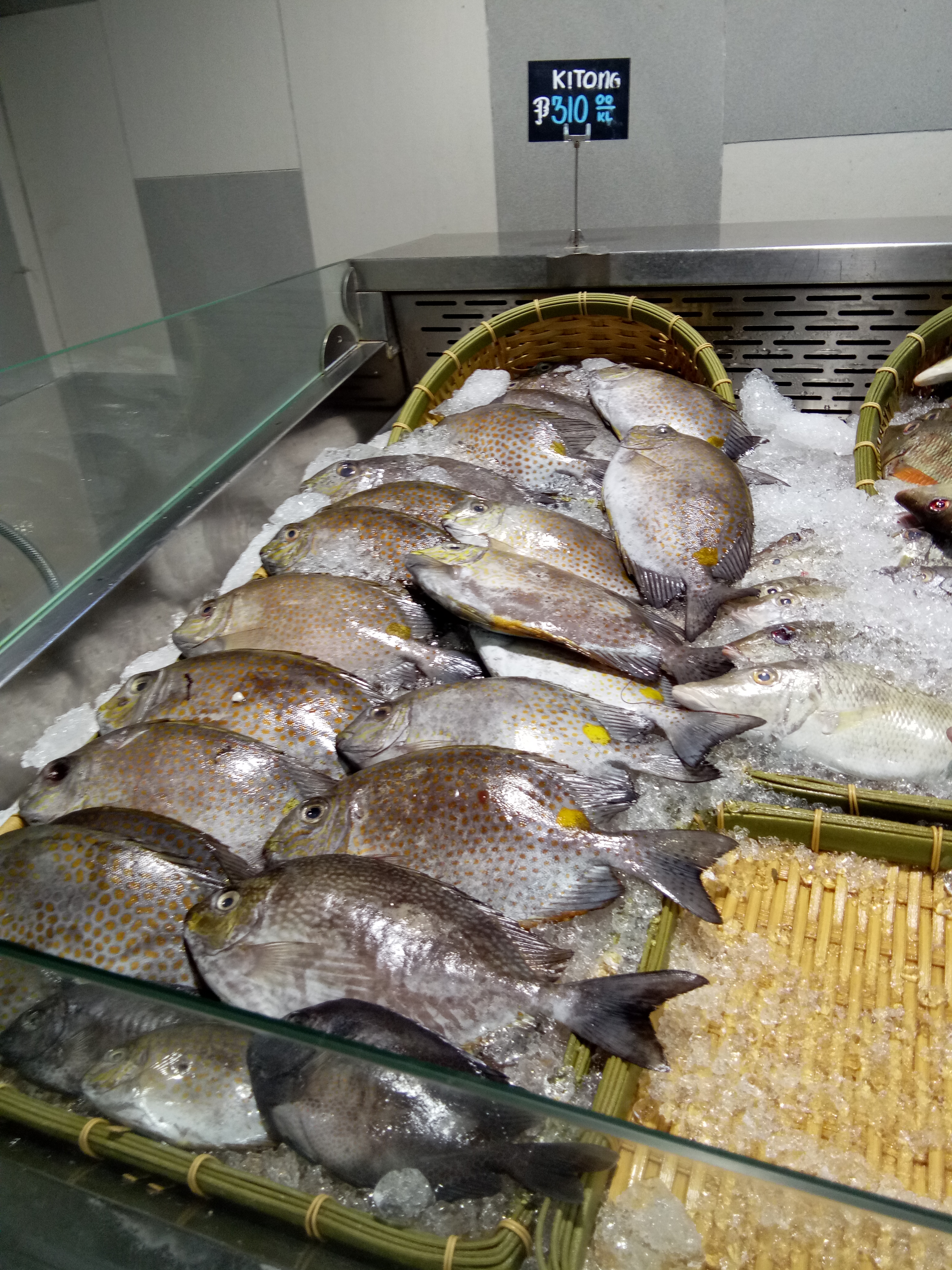
At a market, in the Philippines

The orange-spotted spinefoot is fished for using set nets and fish traps. It is common in markets where it is sold as fresh fish. Rabbitfishes are considered good candidates for aquaculture, and there is mounting interest in the commercial culture of S. guttatus. It has mariculture potential because it is hardy in culture, there is an abundance of wild fry and spawners. The herbivorous diet gives it the potential to be an inexpensive source of protein for mass consumption. It also appears in the aquarium trade.
