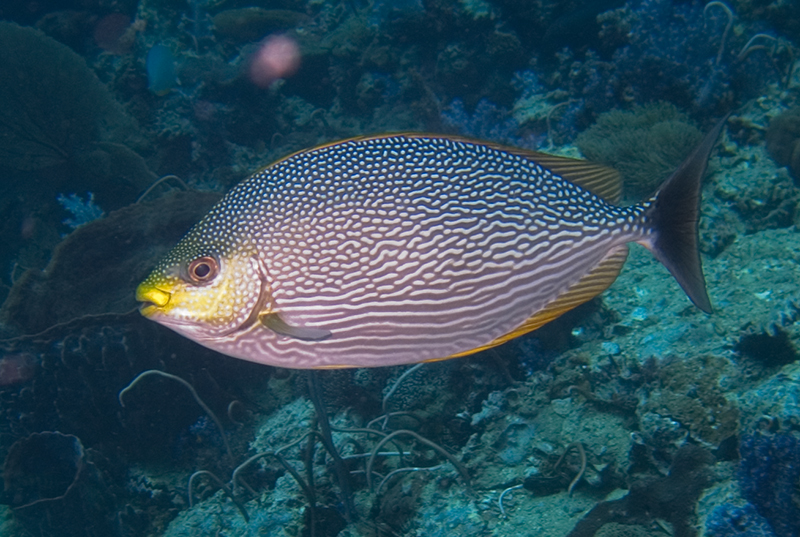

Conservation status
- Least Concern (IUCN 3.1)

Scientific classification
- Kingdom: Animalia
- Phylum: Chordata
- Class: Actinopterygii
- Division: Teleostei
- Order: Acanthuriformes
- Family: Siganidae
- Genus: Siganus
- Species: S. javus

Binomial name
- Siganus javus (Linnaeus, 1766)

Synonyms
- Teuthis javus Linnaeus, 1766; Amphacanthus javus (Linnaeus, 1766); Teuthis brevirostris Gronow, 1854

= Streaked spinefoot =

Species of fish

The streaked spinefoot (Siganus javus), also known as the Java rabbitfish, blue-spotted spinefoot, blue-spotted trevally, Java spinefoot or white-spotted rabbit-fish, is a species of marine ray-finned fish, a rabbitfish belonging to the family Siganidae. It is found throughout most of the Indo-Pacific region.

== Taxonomy ==
The streaked spinefoot was first formally described in 1766 as Teuthis javus by Carl Linnaeus with the type locality given as being near Java in Indonesia. The genus Linnaeus placed it in, Teuthis, has the type species Teuthis hepatus for which one of the type specimens looks like this species, although the other is definitely not a rabbitfish, and the International Commission on Zoological Nomenclature has been asked to suppress the name Teuthis in favour of Siganus to reflect the prevailing usage. The specific name is a latinisation of Java, the type locality.

== Description ==
The streaked spinefoot has a laterally compressed body which has a depth that is just under half its standard length. The head is relatively small for a deep-bodied rabbitfish and has a slight indentation above the eyes. The front nostril has a small triangular flap which extends back half of the distance between the front and rear nostrils. There is a forward pointing spine in front of the dorsal fin which is imbedded in the nape. Like all rabbitfishes, the dorsal fin has 13 spines and 10 soft rays while the anal fin has 7 spines and 9 soft rays. The caudal fin is emarginate. This species attains a maximum total length of 53 cm (21 in), although 30 cm (12 in) is more typical. The overall colour is grey, fading to whitish on the lower body but the cheeks and lips are yellow. There are a large number of small white spots on the head and upper body, irregular sinuous stripes on the mid to lower flanks and a blackish area covering the majority of the caudal fin. The dorsal, anal, and pelvic fins have golden coloured spines and rays while their membranes may be dusky or golden and the pectoral fins are golden hyaline.

== Distribution and habitat ==
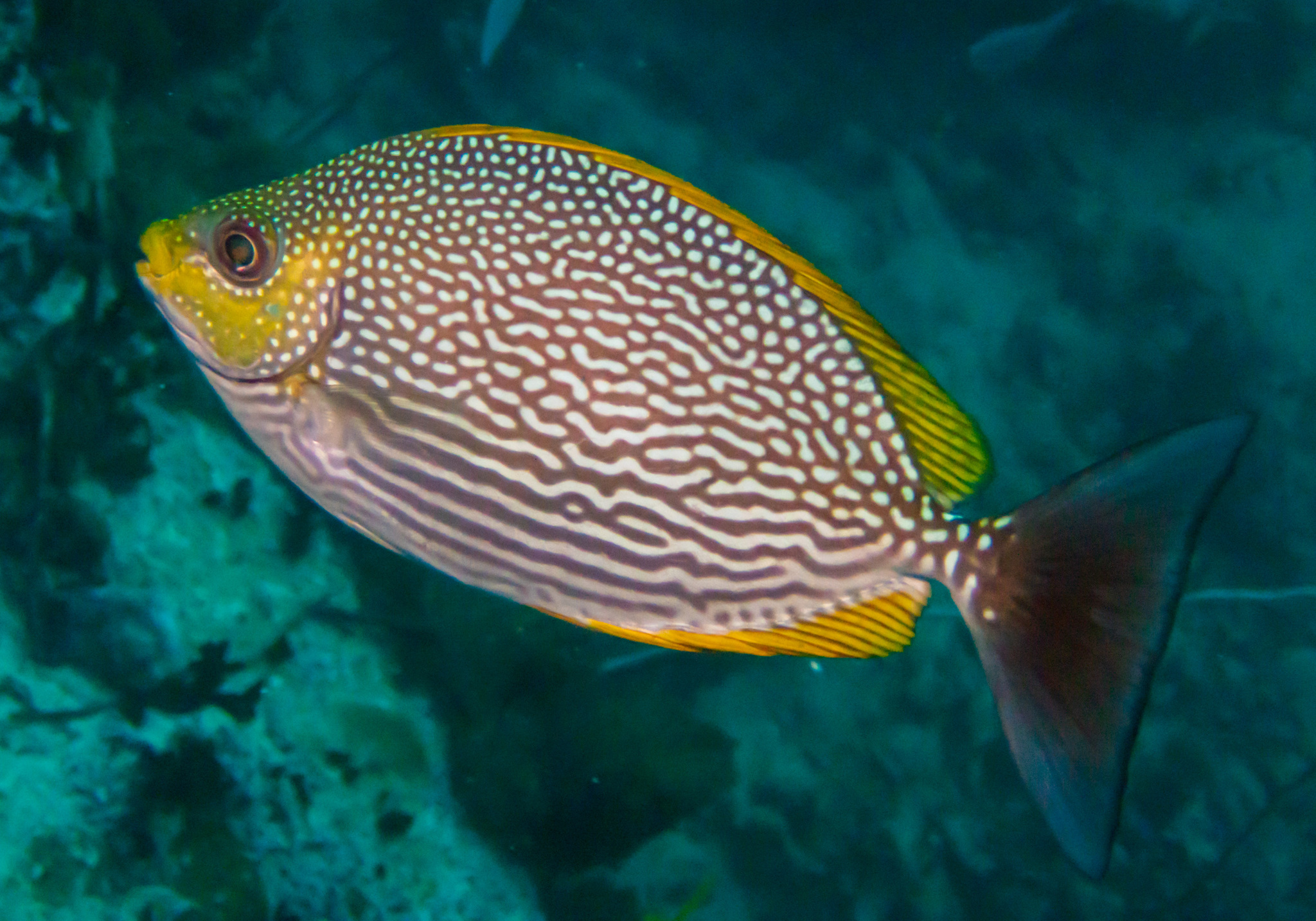
In Thailand

The streaked spinefoot is found from the Persian Gulf west to the Solomon Islands and Vanuatu, north to the Taiwan and south to northern Australia. In Australia it has been recorded from Darwin, Northern Territory to north of Townsville in Queensland. There is a single record from the Mediterranean Sea, an individual was caught of Syria in 2009 but the origin of this specimen is not known. It can be found at depths between 1 m (3 ft 3 in) and 25 m (82 ft) in shallow coastal waters, in brackish lagoons and on rocky and coral reefs.

== Biology ==
The streaked spinefoot occurs in small schools of as many as 10 individuals which feed on benthic algae and on pieces of alga floating in the water column. They often rest in midwater at depths between 2 and 6 m (6 ft 7 in and 19 ft 8 in) when they are not feeding.

=== Venom ===
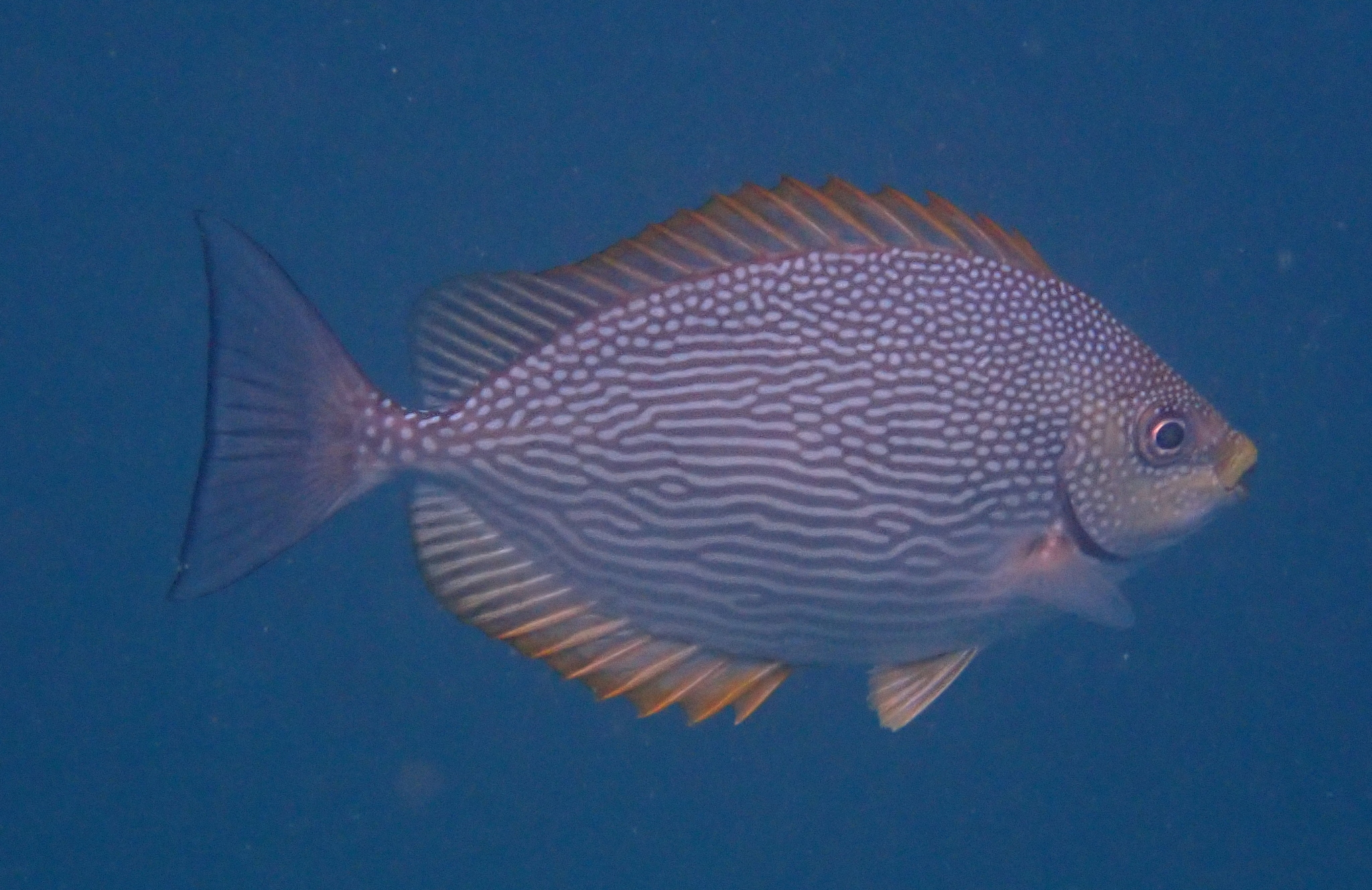
With fin spines extended

The streaked spinefoot has grooves in the spines of the dorsal, anal and pelvic fins which contain venom glands. The wound caused by these spines may be relatively painful to humans, but is usually not dangerous. The spines are used in self-defence. In a study of the venom of a congener it was found that rabbitfish venom was similar to the venom of stonefishes.

== Utilisation ==
The streaked spinefoot is caught using seine nets, gillnets, and in fixed traps and the fish landed are sold as fresh fish. This species is used in aquaculture alongside Siganus sutor in Iran.
