= Siganus labyrinthodes =

Scientific classification
- Kingdom: Animalia
- Phylum: Chordata
- Class: Actinopterygii
- Order: Acanthuriformes
- Family: Siganidae
- Genus: Siganus
- Species: S. labyrinthodes

Binomial name
- Siganus labyrinthodes (Bleeker, 1853)

Synonyms
- Amphacanthus labyrinthodes Bleeker, 1853; Teuthis labyrinthodes (Bleeker, 1853)

Species of fish

Siganus labyrinthodes, the labyrinth spinefoot, is a little known species of marine ray-finned fish, a rabbitfish belonging to the family Siganidae. It is found in the eastern Indian Ocean and western Pacific Ocean.

== Taxonomy ==
Siganus labyrinthodes was first formally described in 1853 as Teuthis javus by the Dutch physician and ichthyologist Pieter Bleeker with the type locality given as Jakarta, Java in Indonesia. The specific name labyrinthodes means “labyrinth like”,, Bleeker did not explain this but it may be a reference to the pattern of lines on the head and sides.

== Description ==
Siganus labyrinthodes has an oblong shaped, laterally compressed body, with a length that is around 2.5 times its depth. The caudal fin is emarginate. Like all rabbitfishes, the dorsal fin has 13 spines and 10 soft rays while the anal fin has 7 spines and 9 soft rays. This species attains a maximum total length of 25 cm (9.8 in).The upper body is golden red with a paler lower body The head, back and flanks are marked with many slender blue lines which vary in form including ones which are undulating, reticulating, transverse and horizontal.

== Distribution and habitat ==
Siganus labyrinthodes has a relatively restricted known distribution in the western central Pacific. It has been recorded only from Java and the Moluccas in Indonesia, although it may be overlooked elsewhere. It is a coastal species which is associated with reefs at depths between 1 and 10 m (3 ft 3 in and 32 ft 10 in).

== Biology ==
Siganus labyrinthodes is thought likely to aggregate in schools although pairs have been recorded on coastal reefs in shallow waters. Its teeth suggest that this species is herbivorous. The fin spines are robust and contain venom glands.
