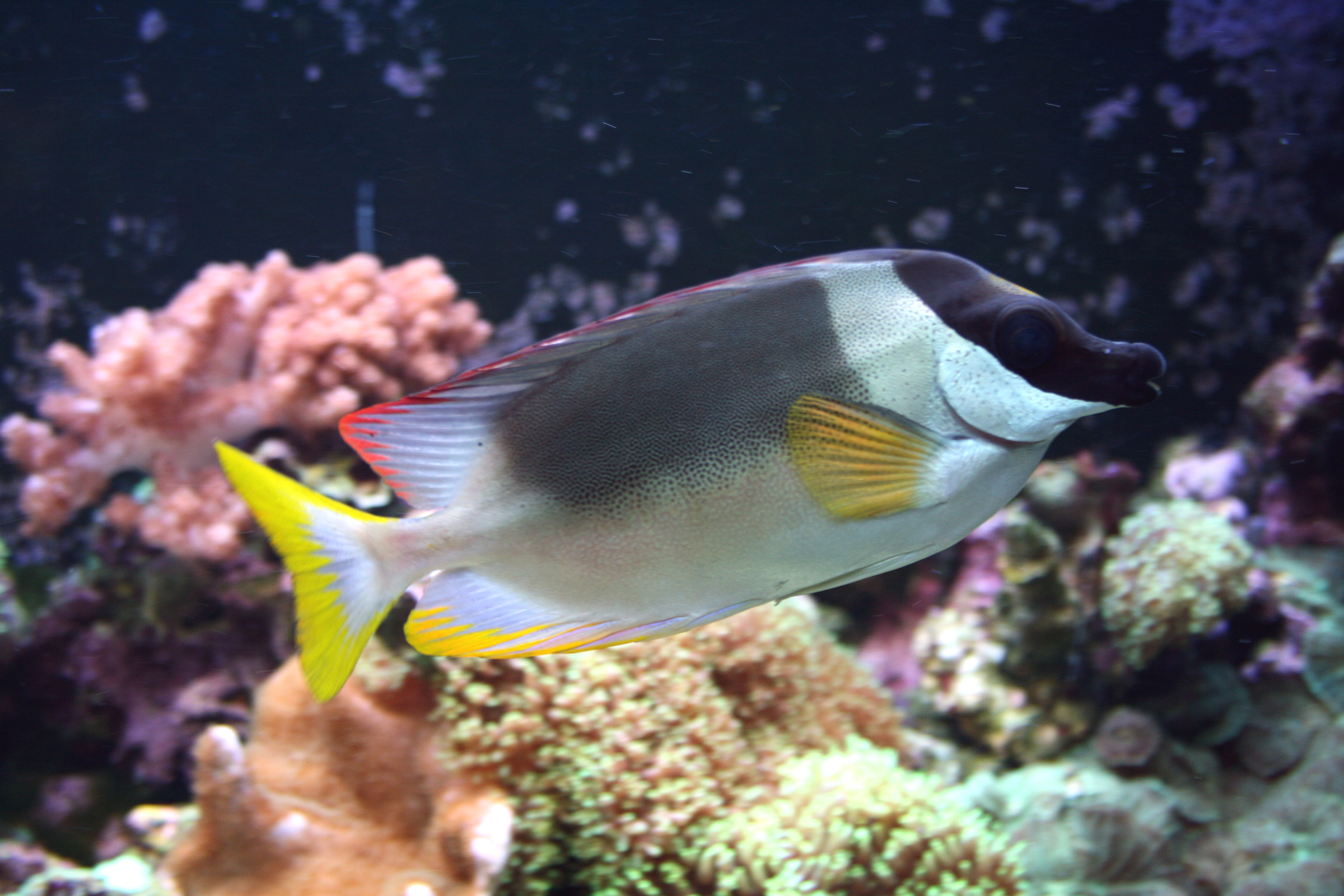

Conservation status
- Least Concern (IUCN 3.1)

Scientific classification
- Kingdom: Animalia
- Phylum: Chordata
- Class: Actinopterygii
- Order: Acanthuriformes
- Family: Siganidae
- Genus: Siganus
- Species: S. magnificus

Binomial name
- Siganus magnificus (Burgess, 1977)

Synonyms
- Lo magnificus Burgess, 1977

= Magnificent rabbitfish =

Species of fish

The magnificent rabbitfish (Siganus magnificus), also known as the magnificent foxface or the Andaman foxface, is a species of marine ray-finned fish, a rabbitfish belonging to the family Siganidae. It is from the eastern Indian Ocean. It occasionally makes its way into the aquarium trade. It grows to a length of 24 cm (9.4 in).

== Taxonomy ==
The magnificent foxface was first formally described in 1977 as Lo magnificus by the American ichthyologist Warren E. Burgess with the type locality given as Phuket in the Andaman Sea off Thailand. Burgess placed it in the genus Lo alongside the other "foxfaced rabbitfishes" but this genus is now subsumed within the genus Siganus, although some workers still treat it as a subgenus. S. magnificus has an allopatric range to the closely related foxface rabbitfish (S. vulpinus), which has a wide Western Pacific distribution. The specific name magnificus means "splendid", a reference to the beautiful coloration of this fish.

== Description ==
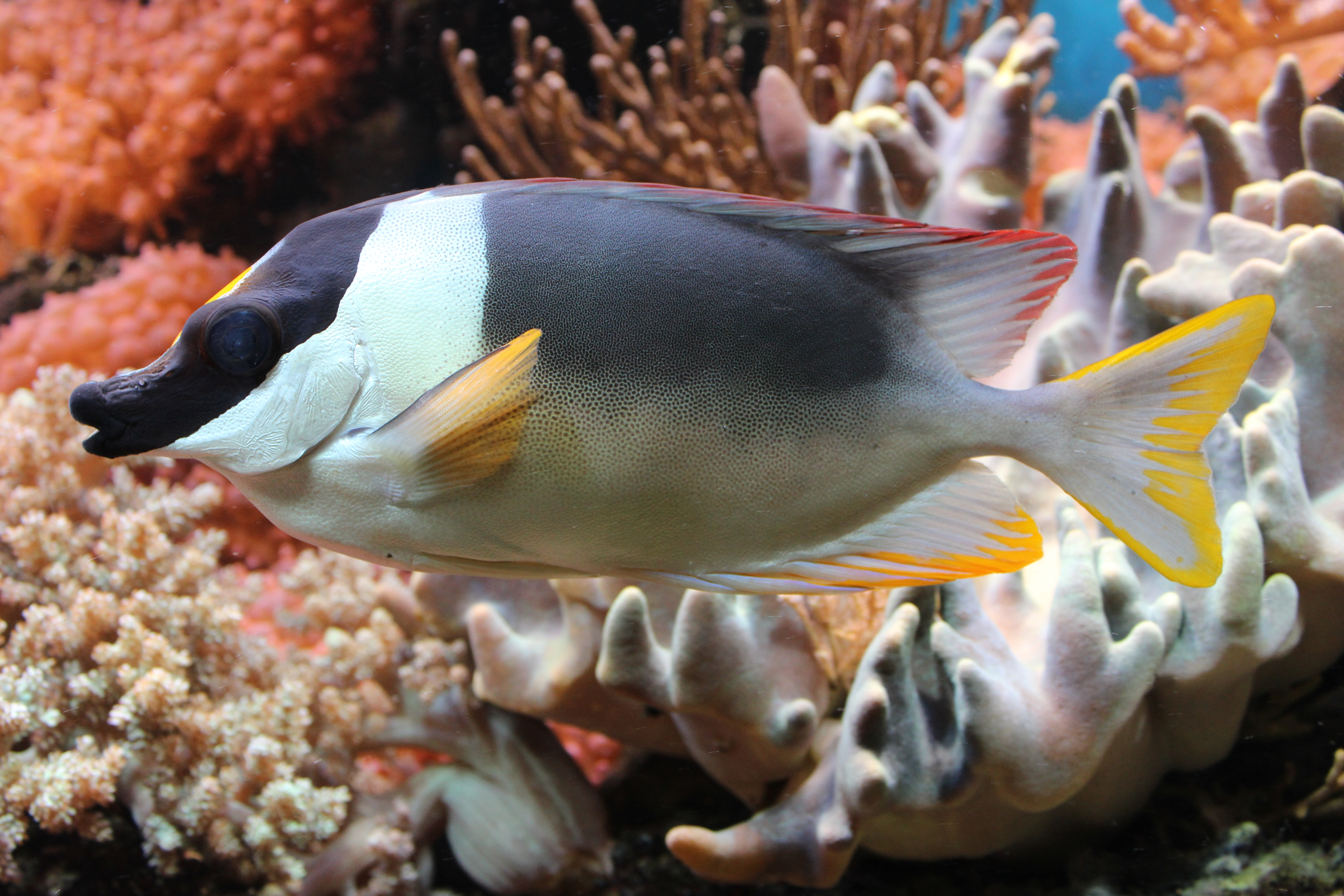
S. magnificus

The magnificent rabbitfish has an oval compressed body with a relatively elongated snout. There are 13 spines and 10 soft rays in its long dorsal fin, while the anal fin has 7 spines and 9 soft rays. It has a slightly forked caudal fin. This species attains a maximum total length of 24 cm (9.4 in), but it is rarely longer than 20 cm (7.9 in). The background color of the body is white, broken by a large black saddle-like blotch with fine spots on its margins. There is also a black facial stripe. The pectoral, anal and caudal fins have bright yellow margins, while the soft-rayed part of the dorsal fin has a pale red margin.

== Distribution and habitat ==
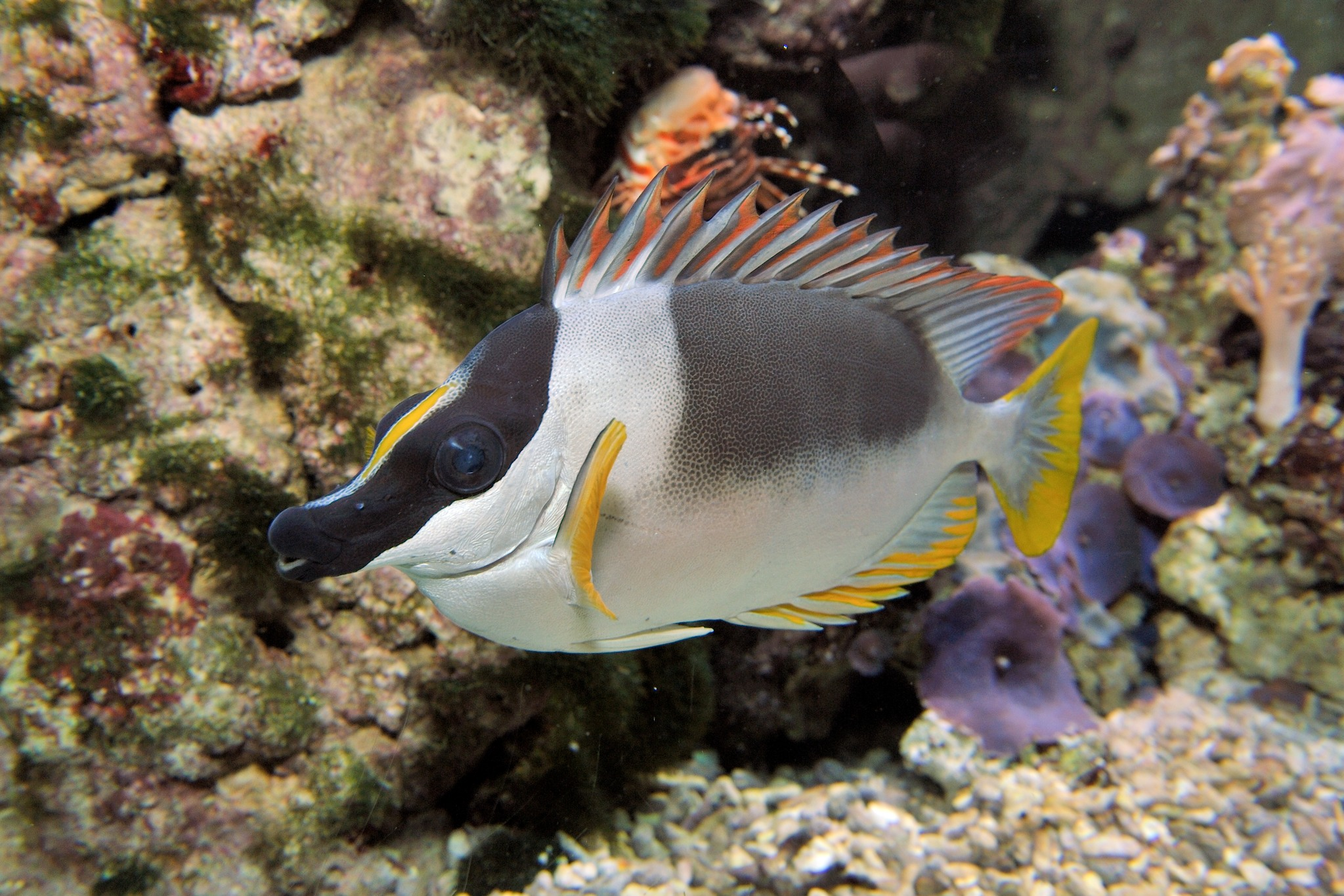
Showing dorsal fin spines

The magnificent rabbitfish is endemic to the Andaman Sea. It has been recorded with certainty from the Mergui Archipelago in Myanmar, and the Surin and Similan Islands in Thailand, it may also occur around the Andaman and Nicobar Islands to the west but it has not been searched for there. Reports of this species from Java and Sumatra require confirmation. It is found at depths between 2 and 30 m (6 ft 7 in and 98 ft 5 in) on coral reefs, most commonly on sheltered reefs among branching corals.

== Biology ==
Signus magnificus has a diet of algae and small invertebrates. The adults are frequently encountered in pairs, while the secretive juveniles tend to occur solitarily and use the coral to provide shelter. Magnificent rabbitfishes are thought to have a lifespan of about 10–12 years, becoming sexually mature at 2 years old. The pelagic larval stage of this species means that there is likely only to be a single population.

== Conservation and utilization ==
The magnificent rabbitfish is classified as Least Concern by the IUCN. The reefs it is found on in Thailand are far enough offshore to be relatively safe from development and many are in protected areas. This species is collected for the aquarium trade.
