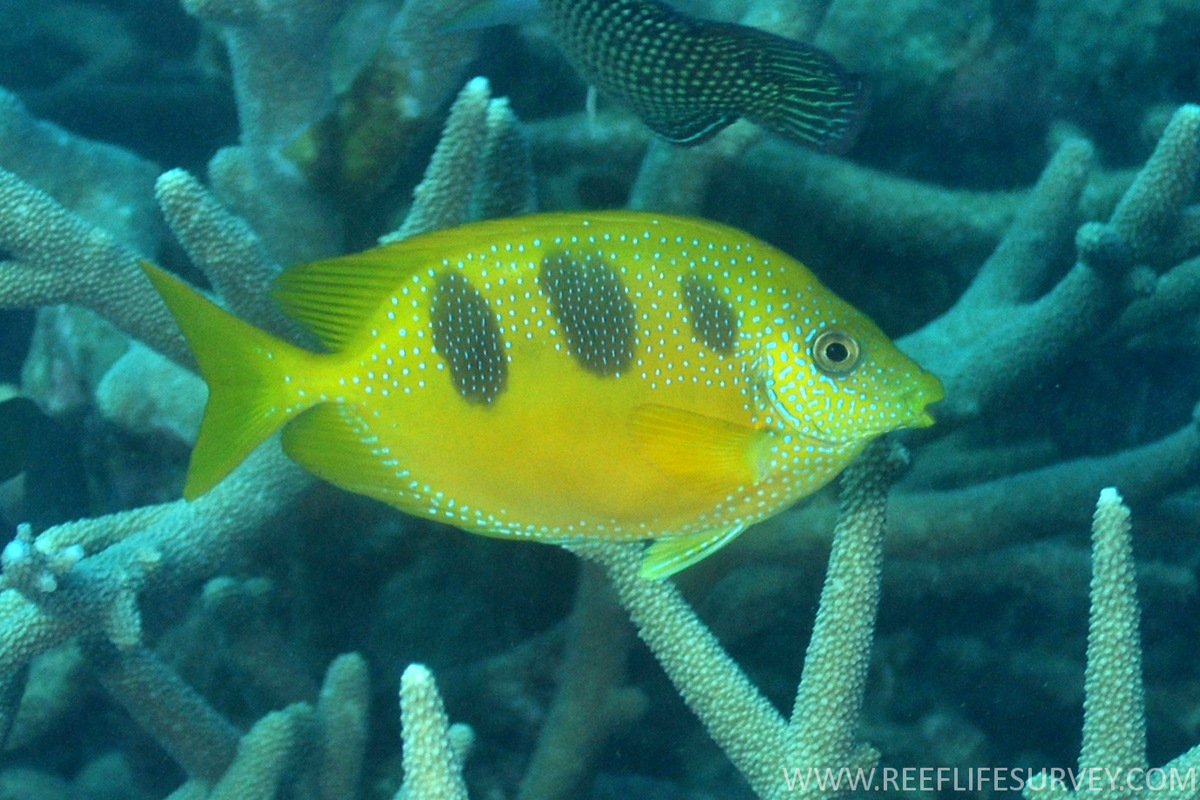

Scientific classification
- Kingdom: Animalia
- Phylum: Chordata
- Class: Actinopterygii
- Order: Acanthuriformes
- Family: Siganidae
- Genus: Siganus
- Species: S. trispilos

Binomial name
- Siganus trispilos Woodland & G. R. Allen, 1977

= Siganus trispilos =

Species of fish

Siganus trispilos, the threeblotched rabbitfish, threespot rabbitfish, threeblotch spinefoot or threespot spinefoot is a species of marine ray-finned fish, a rabbitfish belonging to the family Siganidae. It is endemic to the eastern Indian Ocean off northwestern Western Australia.

== Taxonomy ==
Siganus trispilos was first formally described in 1977 by the ichthyologists David J. Woodland and Gerald R. Allen with the type locality given as off Tantabiddi Creek at the North West Cape in Western Australia. The specific name trispilos is a compound of tri meaning "three" and spilos which means "mark" or "spot", a reference to the three large spots on the upper body.

== Description ==
Siganus trispilos has a laterally compressed deep body, its depth fitting roughly twice into its standard length with a deeply forked caudal fin. The forward nostril opening is a tube which expands to the rear of the nostril into a wide flap. There is a procumbent spine to the front of the dorsal fin. Like all rabbitfishes, the dorsal fin has 13 spines and 10 soft rays while the anal fin has 7 spines and 9 soft rays. The fin spines hold venom glands. This species attains a maximum total length of 33.5 cm (13.2 in). The overall colour is vivid yellow with three large dark brown blotches on the upper flanks, tiny bluish ocelli dot the head, upper flanks and loweset surface of the body with an oblique, ill-defined brown stripe running through the eye.

== Distribution and habitat ==
Siganus trispilos is endemic to the waters of the eastern Indian Ocean off northwestern Western Australia. It has been recorded from the waters from the Ningaloo Reef to the Corneliesse Shoal, which is northwest of Port Hedland. It is found in areas rich in hard corals, particularly being found in Acropora corals.

== Biology ==
Siganus trispilos lives as pairs among the coral, where they browse on upright seaweeds. If disturbed the pairs will dart into the coral for shelter. This species produces venom in the spines of its fins. In a study of the venom of a congener it was found that rabbitfish venom was similar to the venom of stonefishes.
