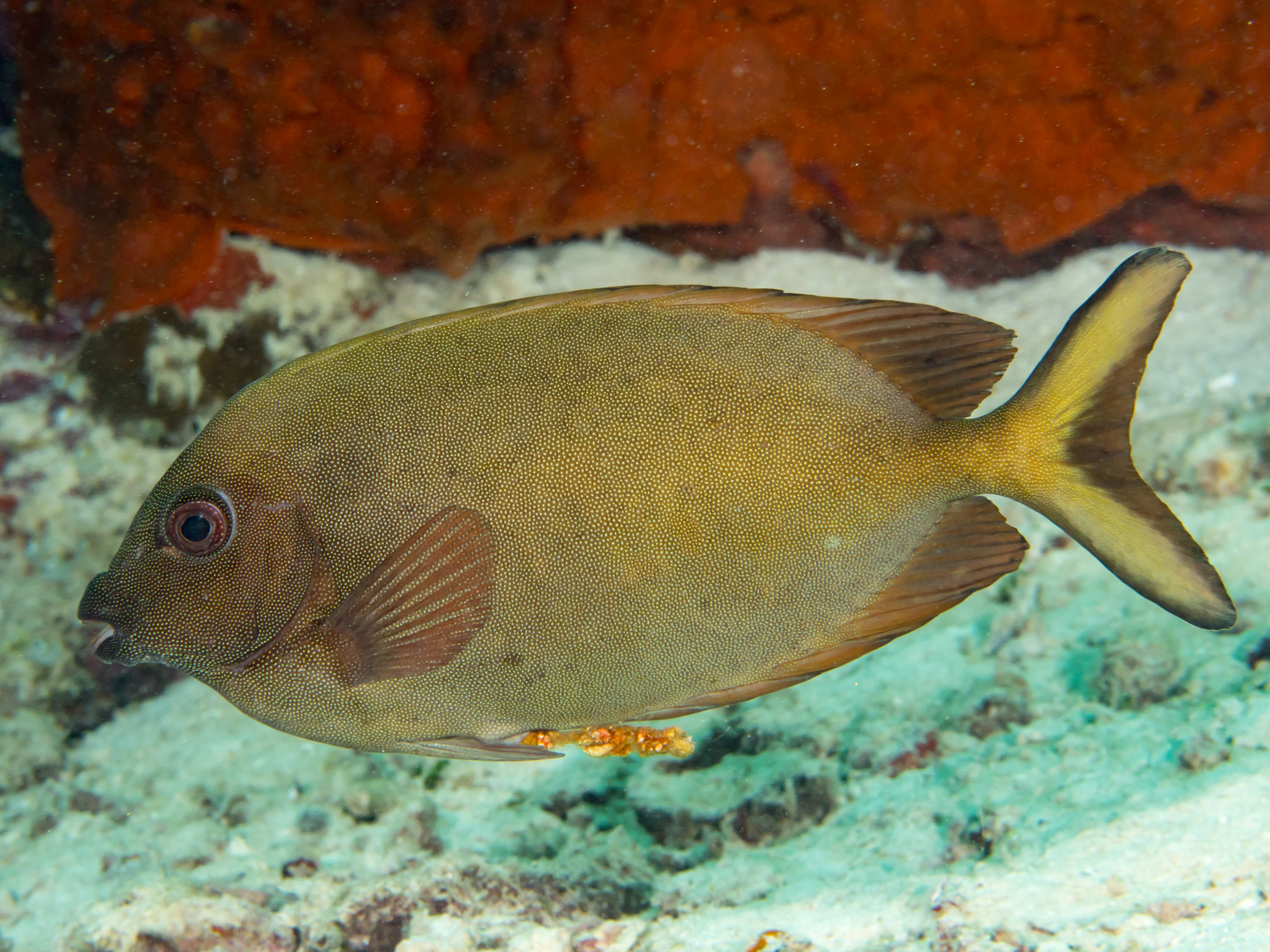

Conservation status
- Least Concern (IUCN 3.1)

Scientific classification
- Kingdom: Animalia
- Phylum: Chordata
- Class: Actinopterygii
- Order: Acanthuriformes
- Family: Siganidae
- Genus: Siganus
- Species: S. punctatissimus

Binomial name
- Siganus punctatissimus Fowler & B. A. Bean, 1929

= Peppered spinefoot =

Species of fish

The peppered spinefoot (Siganus punctatissimus), also known as the finespotted rabbitfish, is a species of marine ray-finned fish, a rabbitfish belonging to the family Siganidae. It occurs in the Indo-West Pacific region.

== Taxonomy ==
The peppered spinefoot was first formally described in 1929 by the American ichthyologists Henry Weed Fowler and Barton Appler Bean with the type locality given as Masinloc Bay in Zambales Province in the Philippines. The specific name punctatissimus means "very spotted, a reference to the body being covered in tiny grey spots.

== Description ==
The peppered spinefoot has a deep and laterally compressed body, its standard length being a little more than twice its depth. The dorsal profile of head is weakly convex, although there is a weak indentation immediately in front of eye and another underneath the chin, creating a protruding snout. The front nostril has a low rim which expands to a wide flap at its rear which extends half-way to the rear nostril. There is a recumbent spine to the front of the dorsal fin which is imbedded in the nape. Like all rabbitfishes, the dorsal fin has 13 spines and 10 soft rays while the anal fin has 7 spines and 9 soft rays. The fin spines are robust and hold venom glands. The caudal fin is strongly forked, especially in adults, with thin lobes which have pointed tips. This species attains a maximum total length of 35 cm (14 in), although 25 cm (9.8 in) is more typical. The overall colour is dark purplish-brown with the head and body covered in tiny close-set pale dots. The yellowish caudal fin has a brownish margin.

== Distribution and habitat ==
The peppered spinefoot has a wide Western Pacific distribution from western Indonesia north to the southern Ryukyu Islands, east to Solomon Islands and Micronesia south to the reefs of the Western Australia shelf and the northern Great Barrier Reef off northern Queensland. It is found at depths between 12 and 30 m (39 and 98 ft) in lagoon and channel reefs, normally in the vicinity of reef slopes and harbours.

== Biology ==
The peppered spinefoot live as pairs once they are adult, the adults feed on benthic macroalgae. The habitat and behaviour of juveniles is not known. This species produces venom in the spines of its fins. In a study of the venom of a congener it was found that rabbitfish venom was similar to the venom of stonefishes.

== Fisheries ==
The peppered spinefoot is caught by trawling and is sold in small quantities in fish markets in the Philippines.
