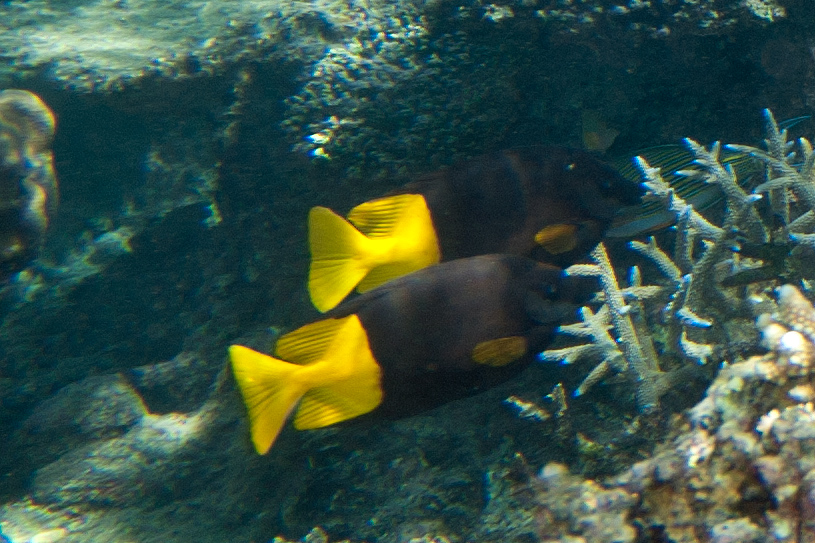

Conservation status
- Near Threatened (IUCN 3.1)

Scientific classification
- Kingdom: Animalia
- Phylum: Chordata
- Class: Actinopterygii
- Order: Acanthuriformes
- Family: Siganidae
- Genus: Siganus
- Species: S. uspi

Binomial name
- Siganus uspi Gawel & Woodland, 1974

= Bicolored foxface =

Species of fish

The bicolored foxface (Siganus uspi), also known as the Uspi rabbitfish, is a species of marine ray-finned fish, a rabbitfish belonging to the family Siganidae. It is found in coral reefs in Fiji in the Pacific Ocean. It occasionally makes its way into the aquarium trade.

== Taxonomy ==
The bicolored foxface was first formally described in 1974 by Michael J. Gawel & David J. Woodland with the type locality given as Joske Reef, 3 kilometers to the west of Suva on Viti Levu, Fiji. The specific name adds a Latin possessive "i" to the initials of the University of the South Pacific as that institution facilitated the authors' studies of fishes in the South Pacific and as a thank you to the people of the region who support the University.

== Description ==
The bicolored foxface has a laterally compressed deep body, its depth fitting roughly a little over twice into its standard length with a weakly forked caudal fin. The forward nostril opening is a very short tube which expands slightly to the rear of the nostril and it has a procumbent spine in front of the dorsal fin. Like all rabbitfishes, has 13 spines and 10 soft rays in the dorsal fin while the anal fin has 7 spines and 9 soft rays. The fin spines hold venom glands. This species attains a maximum total length of 24 cm (9.4 in). The overall colour is dark purplish brown apart from the yellow pectoral fins, soft rayed part of the dorsal and anal fins, the caudal fin, and rear part of body, the delineation of the 2 colours is clear.

== Distribution and habitat ==
The bicolored foxface has only been recorded from Fiji, although there have been reports of vagrants off New Caledonia, albeit unconfirmed. They are found at depths between 3 and 20 m (9.8 and 65.6 ft) in areas of hard corals on the slopes of drop-offs at the reef edges or in the deeper pools within the rest of reefs.

== Biology ==
The bicolored foxface is a herbivore which feeds on seaweeds. The adults live in pairs while the juveniles form schools. This species produces venom in the spines of its fins. In a study of the venom of a congener it was found that rabbitfish venom was similar to the venom of stonefishes.

== Conservation ==
The bicolored foxface is a species of shallow water which is endemic to Fiji and its population is probably very fragmented and it is apparently an uncommon to rare species. It favours coral reefsand so may be suffering from habitat loss in parts of its range which may lead to population declines. Coastal development and collection for the aquarium trade will also impact the population. The IUCN consider that because of its small range and continued habitat decline, it is assessed as Near Threatened.

== Utilisation ==
The bicolored foxface is collected for the aquarium trade using drive-in nets.
