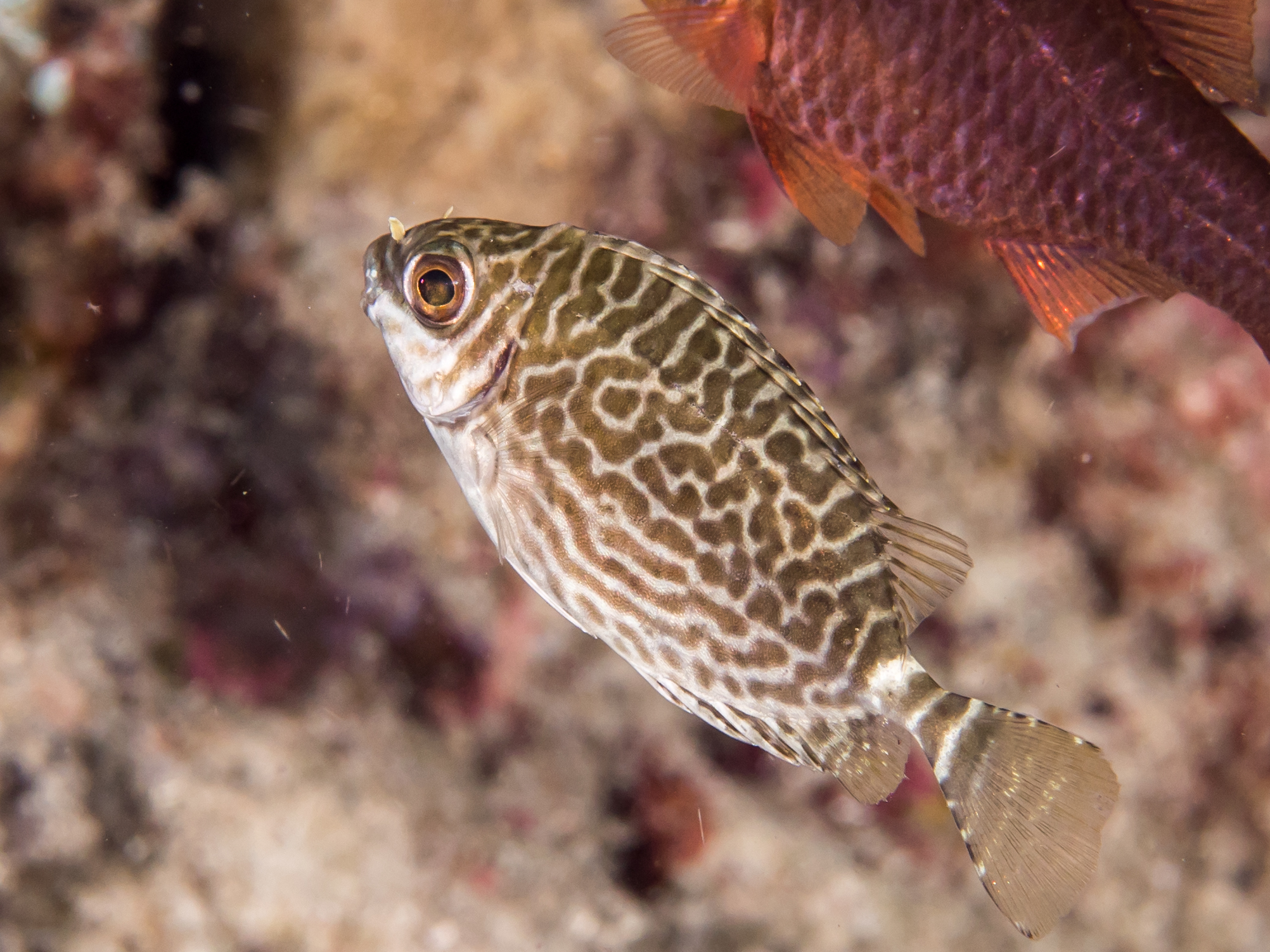

Conservation status
- Least Concern (IUCN 3.1)

Scientific classification
- Kingdom: Animalia
- Phylum: Chordata
- Class: Actinopterygii
- Division: Teleostei
- Order: Acanthuriformes
- Family: Siganidae
- Genus: Siganus
- Species: S. spinus

Binomial name
- Siganus spinus (Linnaeus, 1758)

Synonyms
- Sparus spinus Osbeck, 1757; Sparus spinus Linnaeus, 1758; Amphacanthus marmoratus Quoy & Gaimard, 1825; Siganus marmorata (Quoy & Gaimard, 1825); Siganus marmoratus (Quoy & Gaimard, 1825); Teuthis marmorata (Quoy & Gaimard, 1825); Amphacanthus tumifrons Valenciennes, 1835; Siganus tumifrons (Valenciennes, 1835); Teuthis tumifrons (Valenciennes, 1835); Amphacanthus guamensis Valenciennes, 1835; Amphacanthus scaroides Bleeker, 1853; Teuthis striolata Günther, 1861; Amphacanthus striolatus (Günther, 1861); Siganus striolatus (Günther, 1861)

= Siganus spinus =

Species of fish

Siganus spinus, the little spinefoot, scribbled rabbitfish, blunt-nosed spinefoot, spiny rabbitfish, or spiny spinefoot, is a species of marine ray-finned fish, a rabbitfish belonging to the family Siganidae. It is found in the Indo-Pacific region.

== Taxonomy ==
Siganus spinus was first formally described in 1758 as Sparus spinus by Carl Linnaeus in the 10th edition of the Systema Naturae with the type locality given as Java. The specific name spinis means "thorn" or "spine" which. as the only spine Linnaeus mentioned in his description was the forward pointing in front of the dorsal fin, is presumably a reference to that spine, however, it could also be a reference to the robust and venom-bearing spines on the dorsal, anal and pelvic fins.

== Description ==
Siganus spinus has a laterally compressed, deep and relatively slender body which has a depth which fits into its standard length 2.3 to 2.8 times. The dorsal profile of the head is indented above eye, the snout is convex and blunt. The front nostril has a long flap which reaches to at least two-thirds of the way to the rear nostril. There is a recumbent spine in front of the dorsal fin. Like all rabbitfishes, the dorsal fin has 13 spines and 10 soft rays while the anal fin has 7 spines and 9 soft rays. The fin spines hold venom glands. The caudal fin is emarginate in juveniles and truncate in adults. This species attains a maximum total length of 28 cm (11 in), although 18 cm (7.1 in) is more typical. The body is covered in a labyrinthine pattern of thin brown markings with mottled fins and frequently 4-5 irregular light-coloured bars on the caudal peduncle. The pattern on the body reaches onto the pelvic fins and spiny parts of the dorsal and anal fins. The soft rays of the dorsal and anal fins each have 2-3 dark bands and hyaline membranes. There are 4 pale bars on the caudal fin, but these are frequently ill-defined other than on the outer rays. The pectoral fins are hyaline.

== Distribution and habitat ==
Siganus spinus has a wide Indo-Pacific range, extending from India and Sri Lanka eastwards to the Tuamotu Islands, northwards to Japan and south as far as New Caledonia. In Australia this species is found from Carnarvon to Exmouth Gulf in Western Australia and along the northern Great Barrier Reef and the Torres Strait south to Moreton Bay in Queensland, also in the Coral Sea. It is found at depths between 1 and 50 m (3 ft 3 in and 164 ft 1 in). Adults are found in shallow coral reef flats and can also occur in rivers. The juveniles aggregate in larger numbers in corals which have algae growing at their bases.

== Biology ==
Siganus spinus lives in small schools which typically contain fewer than 10 individuals, the juveniles gather in larger groups. Younger fishes graze on fine textured algae, such as filamentous algae, changing to coarser algae as they grow. They are diurnal feeders throughout their life. This species produces venom in the spines of its fins. In a study of the venom of a congener it was found that rabbitfish venom was similar to the venom of stonefishes.

== Utilisation ==
Siganus spinus is largely avoided by spear fishers in Guam. Elsewhere this species appears frequently, albeit in small numbers, in fish markets in areas where fishers use spears or fish traps. The fry are targeted in some areas by commercial fisheries as they migrate inshore and are preserved in brine or made into fish paste, both adults and fry are also eaten fresh. This species appears in the aquarium trade.
