= Acanthopygaeus =

Acanthopygaeus Temporal range: Early Eocene

Scientific classification
- Kingdom: Animalia
- Phylum: Chordata
- Class: Actinopterygii
- Order: Acanthuriformes
- Family: Siganidae
- Genus: †Acanthopygaeus; Leriche, 1906
- Species: †A. agassizi

Binomial name
- †Acanthopygaeus agassizi (Eastman, 1904)

Extinct genus of ray-finned fishes

Acanthopygaeus is an extinct genus of prehistoric marine acanthuriform fish in the family Siganidae. It is known from the Eocene lagerstätte "Pesciara" in Bolca, Italy.
