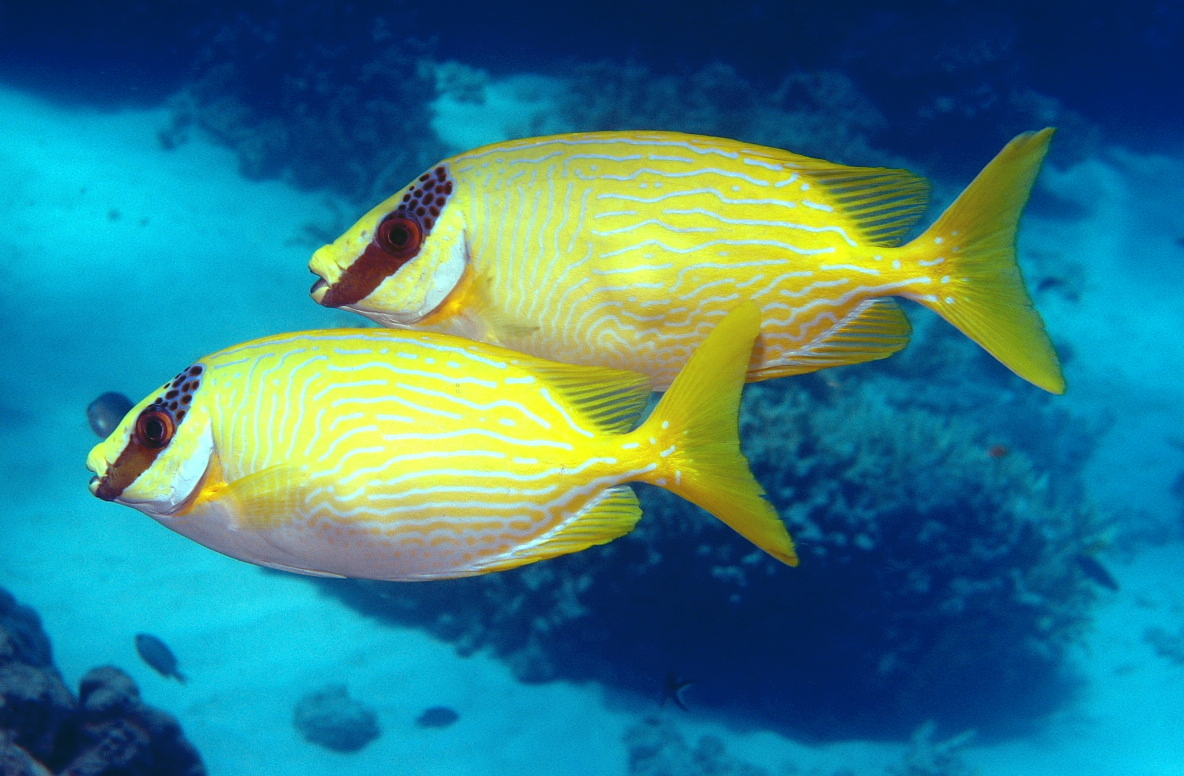

Conservation status
- Least Concern (IUCN 3.1)

Scientific classification
- Kingdom: Animalia
- Phylum: Chordata
- Class: Actinopterygii
- Order: Acanthuriformes
- Family: Siganidae
- Genus: Siganus
- Species: S. puellus

Binomial name
- Siganus puellus (Schlegel, 1852)

Synonyms
- Amphacanthus puellus Schlegel, 1852; Teuthis puella (Schlegel, 1852); Amphacanthus cyanotaenia Bleeker, 1853; Amphacanthus ocularis Thiollière, 1857; Siganus zoniceps Seale, 1906; Siganus sevenlineatus Borodin, 1930; Siganus hexacanthus Barton, 1950; Amphacanthus hexacanthus (Barton, 1950)

= Masked spinefoot =

Species of fish

The masked spinefoot (Siganus puellus), also known as the masked rabbitfish, bluelined rabbitfish, blue-lined spinefoot, decorated rabbitfish or maiden spinefoot, is a species of marine ray-finned fish, a rabbitfish belonging to the family Siganidae. It occurs in shallow, coral-rich areas of clear lagoons and seaward reefs of the Indo-West Pacific region.

== Taxonomy ==
The masked spinefoot was first formally described in 1852 as Ampacanthus puellus by the German zoologist Hermann Schlegel with the type locality given as Ternate in the Molucca Islands in Indonesia. The specific name puellus means "a small boy". Schlegel did not explain why he chose that name.

== Description ==
The masked spinefoot has a compressed body. The depth of its body fits between 2.3 and 2.6 times into its standard length. It has a symmetrical wedge-shaped head with a slightly protruding snout. The front nostril is flanged, the flange growing in to a triangle shaped flap to the rear. There is a recumbent spine to the front of the dorsal fin. Like all rabbitfishes, the dorsal fin has 13 spines and 10 soft rays while the anal fin has 7 spines and 9 soft rays. The fin spines are robust and hold venom glands. The caudal fin is strongly forked, especially in adults, with acutely pointed lobes. This species attains a maximum total length of 38 cm (15 in), although 25 cm (9.8 in) is more typical. The upper body is yellow shading to light blue to white on the lower body. It is marked with sinuous blue lines that are vertical towards the head and horizontal towards the tail. These are replaced with blue spots towards the abdomen. There is a broad diagonal black band that runs through the eye and extends from the chin to the nape. Over the eye, this band breaks up into black spots. The colour of the fins is yellow.

== Distribution and habitat ==
The masked spinefoot has a wide Indo-West Pacific range which extends from the Cocos-Keeling Islands and the outer reefs of northwestern Shelf of Western Australia through Indonesia to the Ryukyu Islands and Kiribati, to southern Great Barrier Reef and New Caledonia. It is found to depths down to 30 m (98 ft) in the shallow waters of clear lagoon rich in corals and on seaward reefs.

== Biology ==
Masked spinefoot juveniles school, especially over areas dominated by Acropora branching corals. The adults live in pairs on the reef, pairing starting at lengths around 7 cm (2.8 in) when they move into deeper water on the reef and near drop offs. The juveniles feed on filamentous algae while the adults feeds on macroalgae and on sponges of the order Monaxonida. This species produces venom in the spines of its fins. In a study of the venom of a congener it was found that rabbitfish venom was similar to the venom of stonefishes.

== Hunting ==
The masked spinefoot is caught by spearfishing and in fish traps and small amounts are regularly found in fish markets. It makes occasional appearances in the aquarium trade.
