= Siganopygaeus =

Siganopygaeus Temporal range: Thanetian

Scientific classification
- Kingdom: Animalia
- Phylum: Chordata
- Class: Actinopterygii
- Order: Acanthuriformes
- Family: Siganidae
- Genus: †Siganopygaeus; Daniltshenko, 1968

Type species
- †Siganopigaeus rarus Danil'chenko 1968

Extinct genus of ray-finned fishes

Siganopygaeus is an extinct genus of ray-finned fish that lived during the Thanetian stage of the Paleocene epoch. It has been placed in the acanthuriform family Siganidae.
