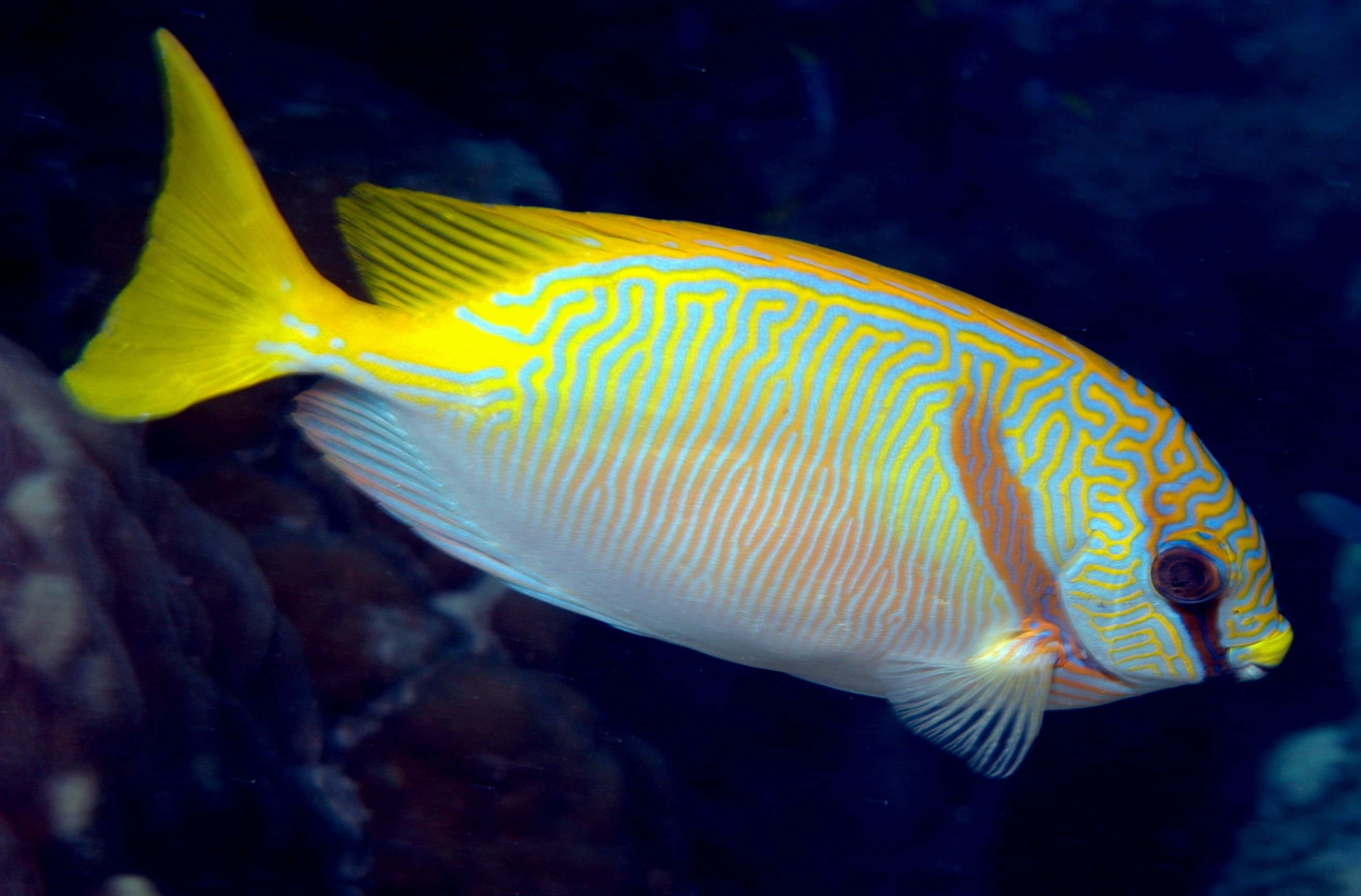

Conservation status
- Least Concern (IUCN 3.1)

Scientific classification
- Kingdom: Animalia
- Phylum: Chordata
- Class: Actinopterygii
- Order: Acanthuriformes
- Family: Siganidae
- Genus: Siganus
- Species: S. doliatus

Binomial name
- Siganus doliatus Guérin-Méneville, 1829-38

Synonyms
- Amphacanthus doliatus (Guérin-Méneville, 1829-38); Teuthis doliata (Guérin-Méneville, 1829-38); Teuthis doliatus (Guérin-Méneville, 1829-38)

= Siganus doliatus =

Species of fish

Siganus doliatus, commonly known as the barred spinefoot, scribbled rabbitfish, pencil-streaked rabbitfish, barred Spanish mackerel, blue-lined rabbitfish or two-barred rabbitfish, is a species of marine ray-finned fish, a rabbitfish belonging to the family Siganidae. It is native to the western Pacific Ocean where it occurs on reefs and in lagoons.

== Taxonomy ==
Siganus doliatus was first formally described in 1829-38 by the French entomologist Félix Édouard Guérin-Méneville in his Iconographie du Règne animal de G. Cuvier IV, Poissons with the type locality given as Buru Island in Indonesia and Vanikoro Island, Santa Cruz Islands in the southwestern Pacific. The specific name doliatus means "barred", thought to be a reference bars on the body. The name is dated 1829-1838 as Guérin-Méneville's description was based on a plate illustration which was published a number of times in that period, it is thought that the plate he used was published by 1834.

== Description ==
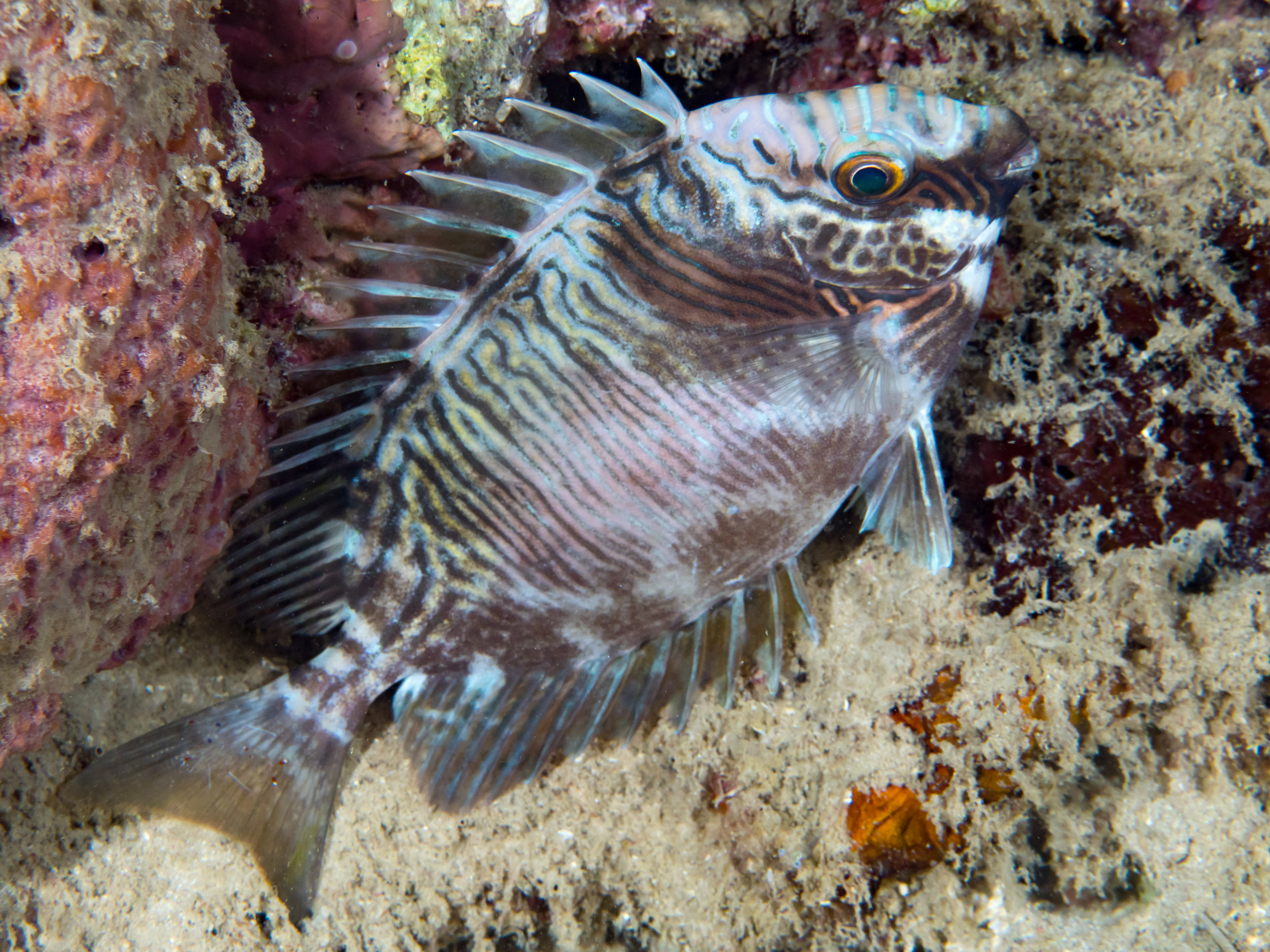
Night time colouration, in Indonesia

Siganus doliatus grows to a length of about 25 cm (10 in). The dorsal fin has thirteen spines and ten soft rays while the anal fin has seven slays and nine soft rays. The spines are robust and venomous. This fish is yellow with a network of fine blue lines on the body, giving it a pattern that resembles a printed circuit board and leads to one of its common names, scribbled rabbitfish. There are two oblique, dark stripes, one running from just below the mouth, through the eye to the nape, and one passing through the operculum.

== Distribution and habitat ==
Siganus doliatus is a marine fish which occurs in the tropical regions, especially found in western Pacific Ocean. Its range extends from eastern Indonesia northwards to Palau and Kosrae, and southward to northern Australia and Tonga. It occurs on the seaward side of reefs and on reef edges, and also in deep lagoons and coral-rich areas in lagoons. Its depth ranges from 2 to 15 meters.

== Biology ==
Siganus doliatus is herbivorous and feed on algae. Juvenile fish form schools, but when the fish reach a length of about 7 cm (2.8 in) they begin to divide up into pairs, which may remain in the schools alongside smaller fish. Larger fish do not school and are usually found in pairs, each with a home range that overlaps that of other pairs. The bonding is not necessarily for the purposes of reproduction, as about 25% of the pairs are formed by two individuals of the same sex. The primary purpose of the pair bonding is likely to be of a reproductive nature but it may be partially used as a defence against predators, and it is also useful for a novel feeding strategy.

When a group of animals is feeding together, if one reacts to a threat, all can benefit by acting appropriately. A pair of scribbled rabbitfish spends about 80% of their time together and are seldom out of visual range. One fish often probes deep into a crevice for food while the other remains alert nearby. Without the presence of the second fish, the grazer would be at greater risk of attack by an unseen predator, and would likely not benefit from the feeding opportunities that left it unsighted in this way. The pair bond enables them to harvest food to which they would otherwise not have access.
