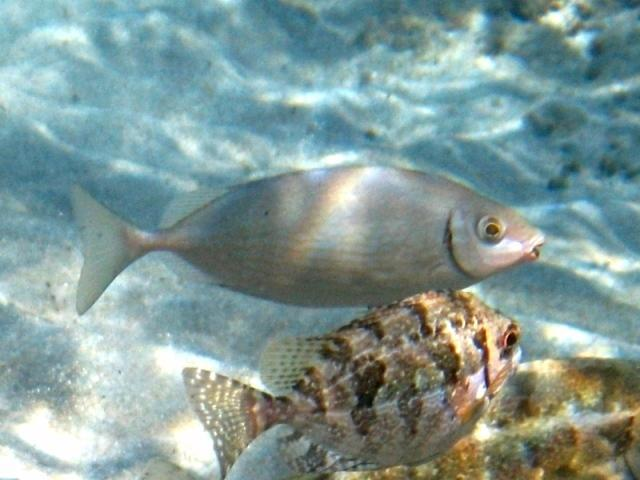
- Marbled spinefoot (Siganus rivulatus)
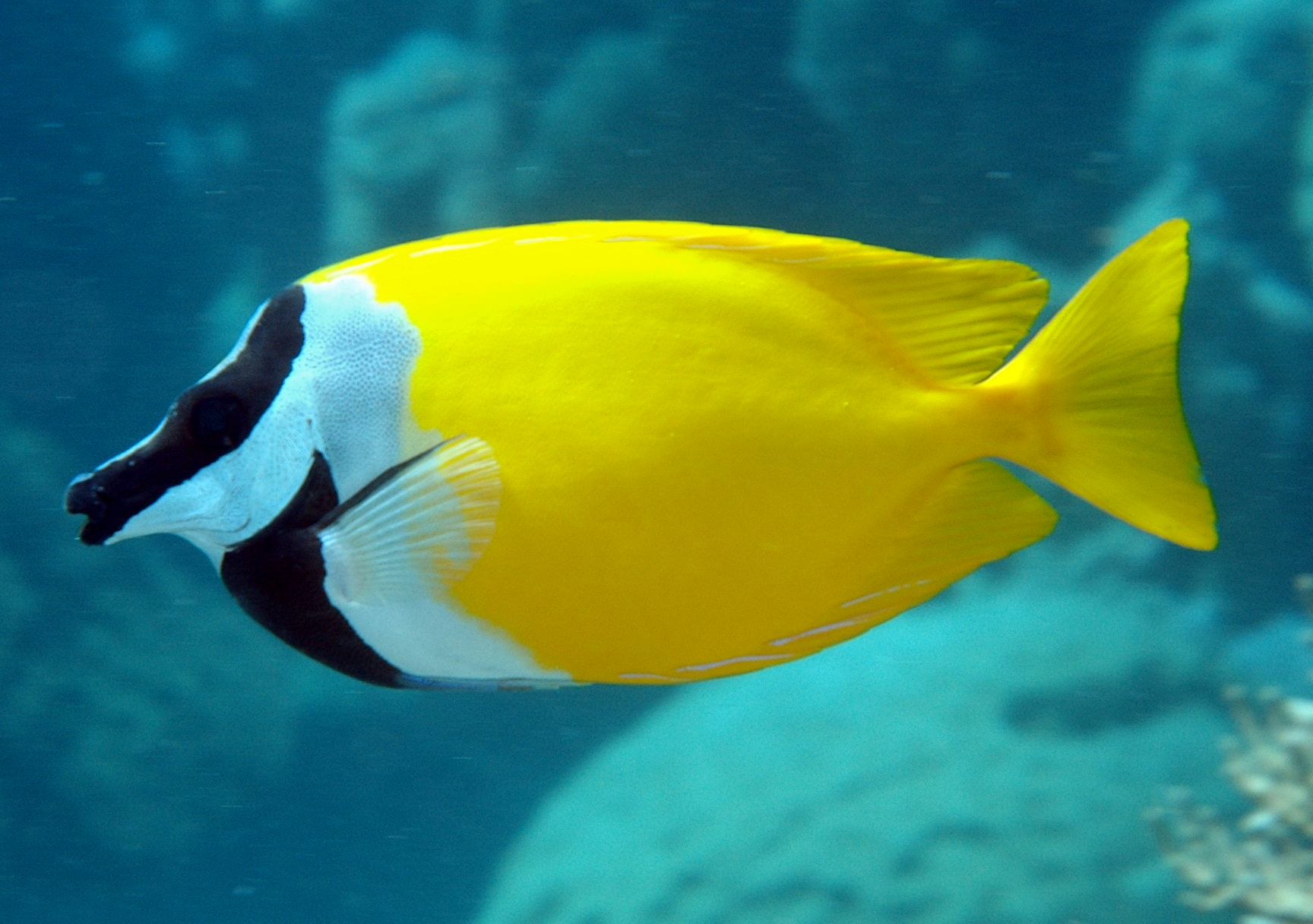
- Foxface rabbitfish (S. vulpinus)

Scientific classification
- Kingdom: Animalia
- Phylum: Chordata
- Class: Actinopterygii
- Clade: Eupercaria
- Order: Acanthuriformes
- Family: Siganidae
- Genus: Siganus; Fabricius, 1775

Type species
- Siganus rivulatus Fabricius, 1775

Species
- About 29, see text

Synonyms
- List: Amphacanthus Bloch & Schneider, 1801; Amphiscarus Swainson, 1839; Buro Lacépède, 1803; Buronus Rafinesque, 1815; Centrogaster Houttuyn, 1782; Lo Seale, 1906; Siganites Fowler, 1904; Teuthis Linnaeus, 1766

= Rabbitfish =

Genus of fishes

Rabbitfishes or spinefoots, genus Siganus, are perciform fishes in the family Siganidae. It is the only extant genus in its family and has 29 species. In some now obsolete classifications, the species having prominent face stripes—colloquially called foxfaces–are in the genus Lo. Other species, such as the masked spinefoot (S. puellus), show a reduced form of the stripe pattern. Rabbitfishes are native to shallow waters in the Indo-Pacific, but S. luridus and S. rivulatus have become established in the eastern Mediterranean via Lessepsian migration. They are commercially important food fish, and can be used in the preparation of dishes such as bagoong.

== Taxonomy ==
The genus Siganus was described in 1775 by the Danish zoologist Johan Christian Fabricius with Siganus rivulatus, a species also described by Fabricius in 1775, designated as the type species. The description was based on notes taken by the naturalist Peter Forsskål when he was on the Danish Arabia expedition (1761–67) and was published in Carsten Niebuhr's Descriptiones animalium avium, amphibiorum, piscium, insectorum, vermium; quae in itinere orientali observavit Petrus Forskål. Post mortem auctoris edidit Carsten Niebuhr. Catalog of Fishes lists the authority as " Fabricius [J. C.] (ex Forsskål) in Niebuhr 1775" and states that the genus is valid as "Siganus Fabricius 1775".

Carl Linnaeus originally described the genus Teuthis, with the type species being Teuthis hepatus. One of the type specimens he used looks like Siganus javus, although the other is definitely not a rabbitfish, and the International Commission on Zoological Nomenclature has been asked to suppress the name Teuthis in favour of Siganus to reflect the prevailing usage.

The name Siganus is a latinisation of the local Arabic name for the marbled rabbitfish (S. rivulatus) in Yemen, Sidjan which can also be written as Sigian, and means "rabbitfish".

In 2007 Kurriwa et al., outlined a way to split the genus—if the scientific community so desires:

- An ancient group containing e.g. S. woodlandi
- Another fairly small group containing, e.g., the S. canaliculatus/S. fuscescens) complex
- The remainder of Siganus, including the foxfaces

Other lineages might exist and make obsolete the somewhat weak distinction between the second and third groups. Also, it is not known where the type species S. rivulatus would fall, hence names for these three subgenera or genera are not established at present.

Hybridizaton has played a role in the evolution of the Siganidae, as evidenced by comparison of mtDNA cytochrome b and nDNA internal transcribed spacer 1 sequence data. Evidence exists of interbreeding between S. guttatus and S. lineatus, as well as between S. doliatus and S. virgatus.

Also, either females of the last common ancestor of S. puellus and the S. punctatus interbred with females ancestral to the main non-foxface lineage, or males of the former hybridized with females of the last common ancestor of S. punctatissimus and the foxfaces, while males of the latter mated with females of the original foxface species.

An individual was found that looked like a slightly aberrant blue-spotted spinefoot (S. corallinus). On investigation, it turned out to be an offspring of a hybrid between a female of that species and a male masked spinefoot, which had successfully backcrossed with the blue-spotted spinefoot.

=== Species ===
As noted above, several presumed species are suspected to actively interbreed even today; these might warrant merging as a single species. This applies to the white-spotted spinefoot (S. canaliculatus) and the mottled spinefoot (S. fuscescens), and to the blotched foxface (S. unimaculatus) and the foxface rabbitfish (S. vulpinus). Alternatively they might be very recently evolved species that have not yet undergone complete lineage sorting, but their biogeography suggests that each group is just color morphs of a single species. On the other hand, the morphologically diverse blue-spotted spinefoot (S. corallinus) might represent more than one species; orange individuals are found at the north of its range, while yellow ones occur to the south, and these two may be completely parapatric.

There are currently 29 recognized species in this genus:

| Species | Common name | Image |
|---|---|---|
| Siganus argenteus (Quoy & Gaimard, 1825) | Streamlined spinefoot | |
| Siganus canaliculatus (M. Park, 1797) | White-spotted spinefoot | |
| Siganus corallinus (Valenciennes, 1835) | Blue-spotted spinefoot | |
| Siganus doliatus Guérin-Méneville, 1829 | Barred spinefoot | |
| Siganus fuscescens (Houttuyn, 1782) | Mottled spinefoot | |
| Siganus guttatus (Bloch, 1787) | Goldlined spinefoot | |
| Siganus insomnis Woodland & R. C. Anderson, 2014 | Bronze-lined rabbitfish | |
| Siganus javus (Linnaeus, 1766) | Streaked spinefoot | |
| Siganus labyrinthodes (Bleeker, 1853) | Labyrinth spinefoot | |
| Siganus laqueus von Bonde 1934 | Brown spotted rabbitfish | |
| Siganus lineatus (Valenciennes, 1835) | Golden-lined spinefoot | |
| Siganus luridus (Rüppell, 1829) | Dusky spinefoot | |
| Siganus magnificus (G. H. Burgess, 1977) | Magnificent rabbitfish | |
| Siganus niger Woodland, 1990 | Black foxface | |
| Siganus puelloides Woodland & Randall, 1979 | Blackeye rabbitfish | |
| Siganus puellus (Schlegel, 1852) | Masked spinefoot | |
| Siganus punctatissimus Fowler & B. A. Bean, 1929 | Peppered spinefoot | |
| Siganus punctatus (Schneider & Forster, 1801) | Goldspotted spinefoot | |
| Siganus randalli Woodland, 1990 | Variegated spinefoot | |
| Siganus rivulatus Forsskål & Niebuhr, 1775 | Marbled spinefoot | |
| Siganus spinus (Linnaeus, 1758) | Little spinefoot | |
| Siganus stellatus (Forsskål, 1775) | Brown-spotted spinefoot | |
| Siganus sutor (Valenciennes, 1835) | Shoemaker spinefoot | |
| Siganus trispilos Woodland & G. R. Allen, 1977 | Threeblotched rabbitfish | |
| Siganus unimaculatus (Evermann & Seale, 1907) | Blotched foxface | |
| Siganus uspi Gawel & Woodland, 1974 | Bicolored foxface | |
| Siganus vermiculatus (Valenciennes, 1835) | Vermiculated spinefoot | |
| Siganus virgatus (Valenciennes, 1835) | Barhead spinefoot | |
| Siganus vulpinus (Schlegel & J. P. Müller, 1845) | Foxface | |
| Siganus woodlandi Randall & Kulbicki, 2005 | | |

== Characteristics ==
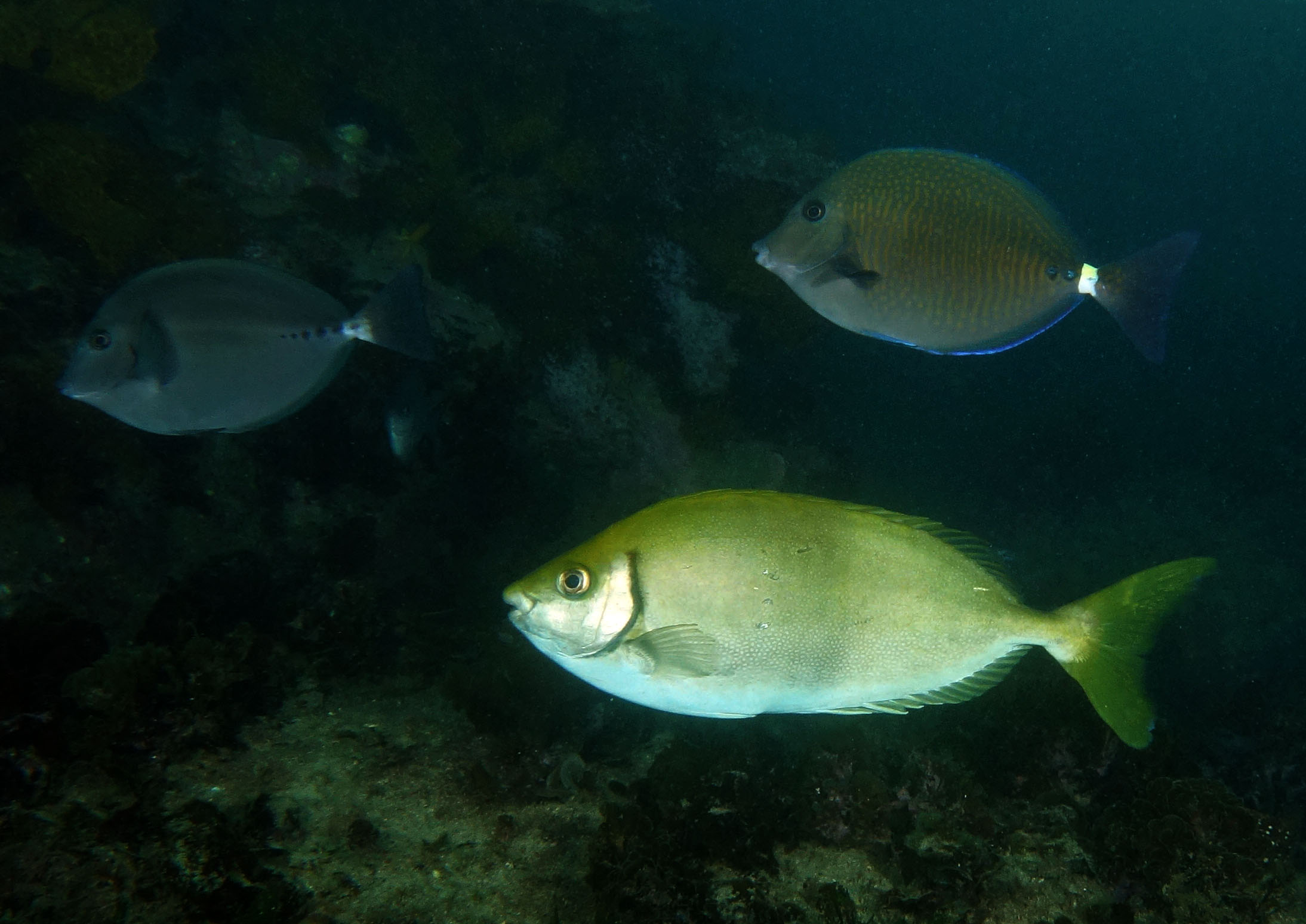
S. fuscescens (Mottled spinefoot), Australia

Rabbitfishes have laterally compressed, oval bodies which may be deep, or slender. A few species have a tubular snout. The mouth is very small and is with non protractile jaws which have one row of compressed, closely set, incisor-like teeth in each jaw. The teeth overlap slightly and create a beak like structure. The dorsal fin has 13 robust spines and 10 soft rays and the front spine is short, sharp and points forward, sometimes projecting from its "pocket" but it may be enfolded. The anal fin has 7 robust spines and 9 soft rays. The pelvic fins have 2 spines with 3 soft rays between them; this characteristic is unique to the Siganidae. There is a membrane which extends from the inner pelvic fin spine to the belly with the anus sitting between these membranes. The tiny scales are cycloid and may be absent from the head region. If present on the head they are restricted to a small area of the cheek under the eye.

They range in maximum total lengths of 20 cm (7.9 in) in the case of the blotched foxface (S. unimaculatus) to 53 cm (21 in) in the streaked spinefoot (S. javus).

=== Venom ===
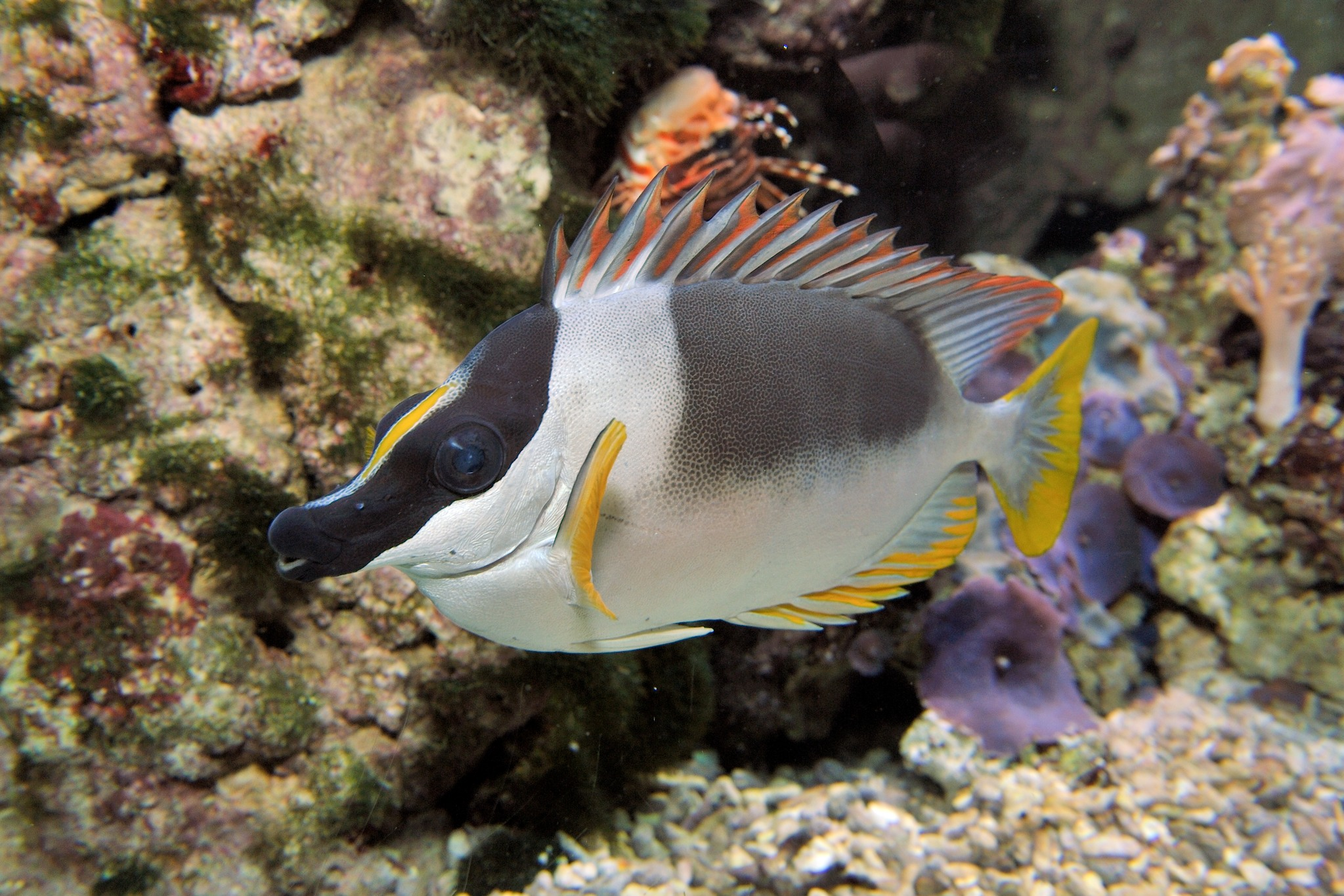
Closeup of the venomous dorsal spines, in Siganus magnificus

Rabbitfish have venomous spines in the dorsal and pelvic fins. In at least three species, the venom has been found to be similar to that found in stonefish. The fin spines are equipped with well-developed venom glands. The sting is very painful, but it is generally not considered medically significant in healthy adults.

== Distribution and habitat ==
Rabbitfishes are found in the Indo-Pacific from the Red Sea and the coast of eastern Africa through the Pacific Ocean as far as Pitcairn Island. Two Red Sea species S. rivulatus and S. luridus have invaded the Mediterranean Sea through the Suez Canal, a process known as Lessepsian migration. These fishes are found in inshore tropical and subtropical waters where they occur in reefs, lagoons, mangroves and seagrass beds.

== Biology ==
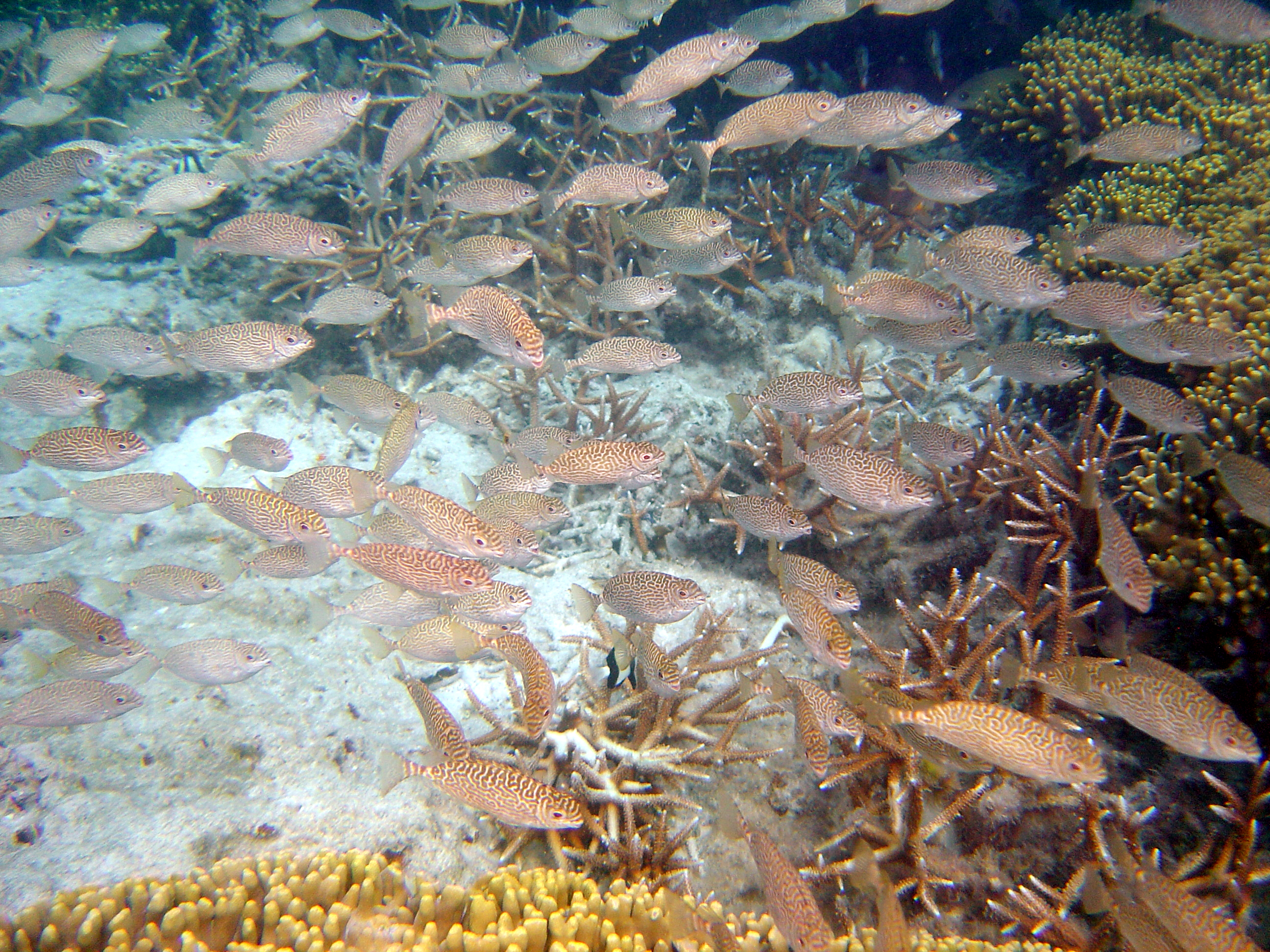
A school of S. spinus (Little spinefoots)

All rabbitfish are diurnal; some live in schools, while others live more solitary lives among the corals. Rabbitfish sleep in crevices in the reef matrix at night. While sleeping, the rabbitfish Siganus canaliculatus was observed being cleaned by the cleaner shrimp Urocaridella antonbruunii. They are herbivorous, feeding on benthic algae in the wild. However, Siganus rivulatus was recently observed feeding on jellyfish (Scyphozoa) and comb jellies (Ctenophora) in the Red Sea. Also Siganus fuscescens have been observed eating prawns and other baits, suggesting that some species are opportunistic omnivorous feeders. The live passage of benthic organisms in the guts of invasive rabbitfish (ichthyochory) was shown to play a major role in the long distance dispersal and bioinvasion of foraminifera. Rabbitfish lay adhesive eggs and some species live as monogamous pairs.

== Utilization ==
Rabbitfish can be important species for commercial fisheries, particularly the schooling species. The catch is largely sold fresh but juveniles may be dried or processed to make fish paste. Some species are used in aquaculture and some of the more colorful species are found in the aquarium trade. Some species have been reported to be hallucinogenic.
