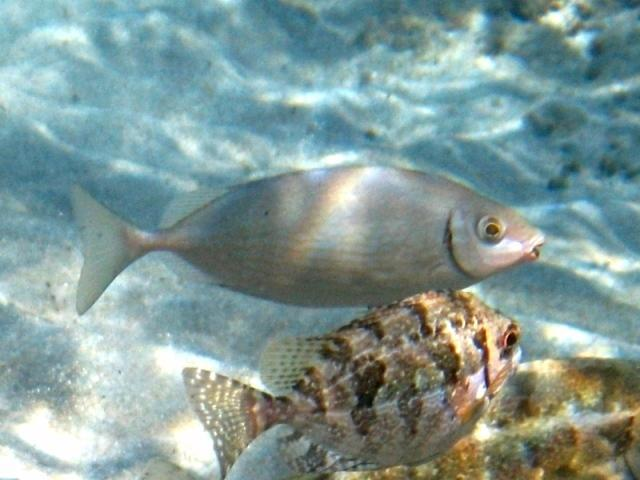
- Marbled spinefoot (Siganus rivulatus)

Scientific classification
- Kingdom: Animalia
- Phylum: Chordata
- Class: Actinopterygii
- Order: Acanthuriformes
- Family: Siganidae; Richardson, 1837

= Siganidae =

Siganidae Temporal range: Eocene–present

Family of fishes

Siganidae, the rabbitfishes, are a small family of ray-finned fishes in the order Perciformes. The only extant genus is Siganus, the rabbitfish and spinefoot. However, a number of genera are known from fossils.

The extant species are marine fish found in the Indo-Pacific and eastern Mediterranean. They are important foodfishes and some are popular in the aquarium trade.

== Taxonomy ==
The Siganidae was first formally described as a family in 1837 by the Scottish naval surgeon, naturalist and arctic explorer Sir John Richardson. The genus Siganus was described in 1775 by the Danish zoologist Johan Christian Fabricius with Siganus rivulatus, a species also described by Fabricius in 1775, designated as the type species. The description was based on notes taken by the naturalist Peter Forsskål when he was on the Danish Arabia expedition (1761–67) and was published in Carsten Niebuhr's Descriptiones animalium avium, amphibiorum, piscium, insectorum, vermium; quae in itinere orientali observavit Petrus Forskål. Post mortem auctoris edidit Carsten Niebuhr. Catalog of Fishes lists the authority as "Fabricius [J. C.] (ex Forsskål) in Niebuhr 1775" and states that the genus is valid as "Siganus Fabricius 1775".

Carl Linnaeus originally described the genus Teuthis, with the type species being Teuthis hepatus. One of the type specimens he used looks like Siganus javus, although the other is definitely not a rabbitfish, and the International Commission on Zoological Nomenclature has been asked to suppress the name Teuthis in favour of Siganus to reflect the prevailing usage.

The family Siganidae is classified as one of two families in the superfamily Siganoidea, within the suborder Percoidei of the order Perciformes in the 5th edition of Fishes of the World. In other classifications it is classified as a family within the order Acunthuriformes, or as one of a group of families classified as incertae sedis within the series Eupercaria.

== Genera ==
There is one extant genus and several extinct ones:

- †Acanthopygaeus Leriche, 1906
- †Aspesiganus Bannikov & Tyler, 2002
- †Caucasiganus Bannikov, Tyler & Sorbini, 2010
- †Eosiganus Tyler & Bannikov, 1997
- †Lagosiganus Bannikov, Tyler & Sorbini, 2010
- †Protosiganus Whitley, 1935
- †Ruffoichthys Sorbini, 1983
- †Siganopygaeus Daniltshenko, 1968
- Siganus Fabricius, 1775
