= Abudefduf nigrimargo =

Scientific classification
- Kingdom: Animalia
- Phylum: Chordata
- Class: Actinopterygii
- Order: Blenniiformes
- Family: Pomacentridae
- Genus: Abudefduf
- Species: A. nigrimargo

Binomial name
- Abudefduf nigrimargo Wibowo, Koeda, Muto & Motomura, 2018

Species of fish

Abudefduf nigrimargo, known as the black margined-scale sergeant, is a species of damselfish in the family Pomacentridae. It is native to the northwestern Pacific Ocean, where it is known only from Taiwan. The species is known to occur above shallow rocky reefs, where it forms feeding aggregations. The habitat in which Abudefduf nigrimargo can be found is also known to be inhabited by the related species Abudefduf vaigiensis and Abudefduf caudobimaculatus (previously recognized as synonymous with A. vaigiensis). The species reaches 12 cm (4.7 inches) in standard length.

Abudefduf nigrimargo was first described in 2018 by Kunto Wibowo of the Indonesian Institute of Sciences, Keita Koeda of the University of the Ryukyus, Nozomu Muto of Tokai University, and Hiroyuki Motomura of the Kagoshima University Museum on the basis of specimens collected from southern Taiwan in the vicinity of Kenting National Park.
