= Sea Life Sydney Aquarium =

Aquarium in Sydney, Australia

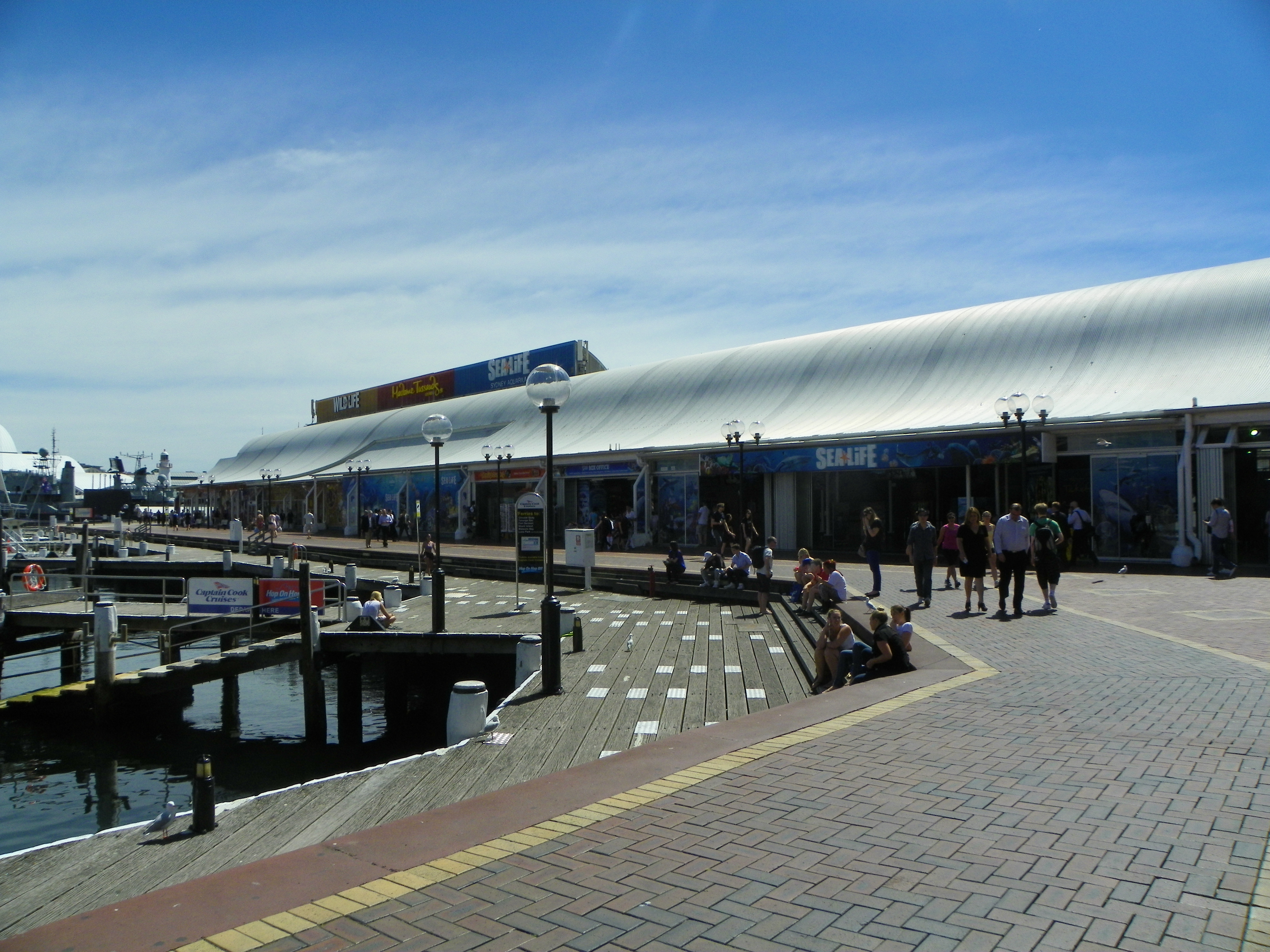
- Main entrance
- Interactive map of Sea Life Sydney Aquarium
- 33°52′10″S 151°12′07″E
- Date opened: 1988; 38 years ago
- Location: Sydney, New South Wales, Australia
- No. of animals: 13,000
- No. of species: 700
- Volume of largest tank: 2,000,000 litres (440,000 imp gal; 530,000 US gal)
- Annual visitors: Over 1.2 million
- Memberships: ZAA, WAZA
- Major exhibits: Day and Night on the Reef, Dugong Island, Shark Valley, Penguin Expedition, Discovery Rockpool, Sydney Harbour, South Coat Shipwreck
- Website: visitsealife.com/sydney

SEA LIFE Sydney Aquarium (formerly Sydney Aquarium) is a public aquarium in Sydney, Australia. Opened in 1988, it features a large variety of Australian aquatic life, displaying more than 700 species comprising more than 13,000 individual fish and other sea and water creatures from most of Australia's water habitats.

The aquarium features themed zones, including Jurassic Seas, Discovery Rockpool, Shark Walk, and the world's largest Great Barrier Reef display. Along the way, visitors encounter animals unique to each habitat, including one of only four dugongs on display in the world, sharks, stingrays, penguins, and tropical fish, among others.

The aquarium is located on the eastern (city) side of Darling Harbour to the north of the Pyrmont Bridge. It is a full institutional member of the Zoo and Aquarium Association and the World Association of Zoos and Aquariums.

== History ==
The aquarium was designed by Australian architects to resemble a large wave, to complement the underwater theme of an aquarium and the maritime theme of Darling Harbour. It took nearly two years to build, opening in 1988.

In December 1991, the first Seal Sanctuary was opened. A new, upgraded oceanarium to house seals opened in September 2003. The Seal Sanctuary features Australian sea lions, Australian fur seals, subantarctic fur seals, and New Zealand fur seals. In this floating oceanarium, the seals can be seen below the water's surface from underwater viewing tunnels, and from above on an open-air deck. The Seal Sanctuary is incorporated into the Southern Oceans exhibit, which also features little penguins, the Open Ocean Oceanarium, and Sydney Harbour displays.

In October 1998, the Great Barrier Reef complex opened, comprising a tropical touch pool, a live coral cave, coral atoll, two circular gateway displays, and a large Great Barrier Reef oceanarium. Over 6,000 animals are housed in the oceanarium, which contains 2.6 million litres (572,000 imp gal, 687,000 U.S. gal) of water pumped from Darling Harbour, filtered and heated before it flows into the oceanarium and adjoining display tanks. The water is kept at a constant temperature of 25 °C (77 °F). The Oceanarium is 33 metres (108 ft) long and 13 metres (43 ft) wide, with a total area of about 370 square metres (4,000 sq ft) and a water depth of 3.5 metres (11 ft). The final exhibit is a reef theatre, where activity in a coral canyon can be observed through a window 7 by 4 metres (23 by 13 ft) and 26 centimetres (10 in) in thickness.

In 2006, Wild Life Sydney opened next to Sydney Aquarium, which is also owned by Merlin Entertainments.

On 20 December 2007 a glass-bottomed boat began operating, giving visitors a tour of the Great Barrier Reef tank. A crocodile exhibit was added in 2008.

In 2008 the Seal Sanctuary was closed, and the seals were sent to Sea World on the Gold Coast. It was renovated, and reopened as Dugong Island in December 2008, with two dugongs, Wuru and Pig, transferred there from the Gold Coast, also in 2008. Wuru died in 2018. The remaining dugong, Pig, is the only captive dugong in Australia. Dugong Island has above-water viewing areas as well as underwater viewing tunnels.

Other animals kept in the oceanarium include a shark ray, shovelnose rays, zebra sharks, eagle rays, and dozens of different species of fish.

In March 2012, Merlin Entertainments announced that they would be spending $10 million refurbishing the aquarium facilities. As part of the process, the aquarium was rebranded as a Sea Life Centre and was relaunched on 24 September 2012.

== Exhibits ==
The SEA LIFE Sydney Aquarium has distinctly Australian themes and exhibits, which take visitors through the continent's waterways and marine ecosystems. Exhibits cover the rivers of Australia, exploring the Southern and Northern River habitats, as well as the oceans of Australia, through the Southern and Northern Ocean habitats. The complex and fragile nature of Australia's very different and unique aquatic environments is emphasized.

Some of the displays are housed in the main exhibit hall and others are housed in floating oceanariums. Dugong Island and Shark Valley comprise two massive oceanariums, amongst the largest in the world, and have underwater tunnels allowing visitors to examine marine life at close quarters. In the Shark Valley Oceanarium, SEA LIFE Sydney Aquarium houses a large collection of sharks including Lemon Sharks and Grey Nurse Sharks. Some of the sharks weigh up to 300 kilograms (660 lb) and are over 3 metres (9.8 ft) in length.

The SEA LIFE Sydney Aquarium is split into the following exhibit areas and highlights:

- Jurassic Seas
- Shark Valley
- Dugong Island
  - Dugong exhibit
- Southern Ocean
  - Little penguins habitat
  - Sydney Harbour
  - Open Ocean Oceanarium
- Northern Ocean
  - Great Barrier Reef Oceanarium
- South Coast Shipwreck
- Day and Night on the Reef
- Discovery Rockpool

Full Species List
- Australian water dragon
- Azure demoiselle
- Banggai cardinalfish
- Barramundi
- Bellus angelfish
- Bicolour angelfish
- Bicolour chromis
- Bicolour cleaner wrasse
- Bignose unicornfish
- Bird-nose wrasse
- Black-axil chromis
- Blacksaddle goatfish
- Blacktip reef shark
- Blue devil
- Blue-green chromis
- Blue-striped goatfish
- Bluespine unicornfish
- Bluestreak cleaner wrasse
- Bluestripe snapper
- Bridled leatherjacket
- Bridled monocle bream
- Brown surgeonfish
- Brown-banded bamboo shark
- Chinamanfish
- Chocolate surgeonfish
- Cinnamon clownfish
- Copperband butterflyfish
- Coral banded pipefish
- Crested morwong
- Crimson-banded wrasse
- Diamondfish
- Diamondscale mullet
- Double-saddled butterflyfish
- Dugong
- Dwarf lionfish
- Eastern fiddler ray
- Eastern fortescue
- Eastern hulafish
- Eastern pomfred
- Eastern shovelnose ray
- Emperor angelfish
- Epaulette shark
- Estuary glassfish
- Eyestripe surgeonfish
- Firetail gudgeon
- Foxface
- Freckled porcupinefish
- Freshwater crocodile
- Freshwater longtom
- Gentoo penguin
- Giant glassfish
- Golden trevally
- Green turtle
- Grey nurse shark
- Grooved razorfish
- Half-and-half chromis
- Harlequin tuskfish
- Humpback red snapper
- Humphead wrasse
- Jelly Blubber
- Indo-Pacific tarpon
- King penguin
- Lemon damselfish
- Leopard shark
- Lined surgeonfish
- Little penguin
- Loggerhead turtle
- Longfin bannerfish
- Mado
- Masked rabbitfish
- Mata tang
- Moonlighter
- Moorish idol
- Mulloway
- Narrow sawfish
- Narrow-lined cardinalfish
- Ocellaris clownfish
- Oldwife
- Orangespine unicornfish
- Pacific blue tang
- Painted sweetlips
- Pajama cardinalfish
- Peacock Mantis Shrimp
- Pink anemonefish
- Port Jackson shark
- Smooth Stingray
- Powder blue tang
- Pyramid butterflyfish
- Queensland lungfish
- Red bass
- Red emperor
- Red lionfish
- Red morwong
- Redtooth triggerfish
- Roundface batfish
- Sailfin tang
- Sand whiting
- Scissortail sergeant
- Scribbled angelfish
- Sea mullet
- Seven-spot archerfish
- Sieve-patterned moray eel
- Silver sweep
- Slingjaw wrasse
- Smallscale bullseye
- Snakehead gudgeon
- Snub-nosed dart
- Southern pygmy leatherjacket
- Southern velvetfish
- Spangled perch
- Spotted eagle ray
- Spotted gar
- Spotted hawkfish
- Spotted scat
- Spotted wobbegong
- Starck's damselfish
- Striped scat
- Starry Puffer
- Stripey
- Swallowtail angelfish
- Sydney cardinalfish
- Tarwhine
- Tawny nurse shark
- Threadfin butterflyfish
- Threadfin cardinalfish
- Three-bar porcupinefish
- Titan triggerfish
- Two-barred rabbitfish
- Upside-down Jellyfish
- Whitecheek surgeonfish
- Whitetail humbug
- Whitetip reef shark
- White’s seahorse
- Whitley's sergeant
- Yellow longnose butterflyfish
- Yellow tang
- Yellow-banded sweetlips
- Yellow-tail fusilier
- Yellowfin bream
- Yellowfin surgeonfish
- Yellowtail demoiselle
- Yellowtail scad

== Research and conservation ==
The SEA LIFE Sydney Aquarium has provided facilities and/or assistance to research institutions including the University of Sydney, the University of New South Wales, the La Trobe University, Indiana University, the Australian Museum, the Queensland National Parks and Wildlife Service, and the New South Wales Fisheries Research Institute.

SEA LIFE Sydney Aquarium and its conservation charity SEA LIFE Trust has assisted by providing holding facilities for animals used in many research projects carried out by these organisations. In recent years, the aquarium has been involved in the tagging of sea turtles and sharks, collections for research and the holding of invertebrates for research. Other projects include the effects of heavy metal contamination in marine environments and fish tag longevity on rays, endangered seahorse breeding program, consisting of 'seahorse hotels', and other local and global conservation projects

The aquarium also shares conservation information to visitors through its program ″Breed, Rescue, Protect″.

== See also ==
- Merlin Entertainments
- Taronga Zoo
- Sydney Tower
- Manly Sea Life
- Wild Life Sydney
- Sea Life Melbourne Aquarium
