= Banded damselfish =

Banded damselfish is a common name for several fishes and may refer to:

- Abudefduf abdominalis, native to the eastern central Pacific
- Dischistodus fasciatus, in the genus Dischistodus, native to the western Pacific
