= Abudefduf caudobimaculatus =

Okinawa sergeant

Conservation status
- Least Concern (IUCN 3.1)

Scientific classification
- Kingdom: Animalia
- Phylum: Chordata
- Class: Actinopterygii
- Division: Teleostei
- Order: Blenniiformes
- Family: Pomacentridae
- Genus: Abudefduf
- Species: A. caudobimaculatus

Binomial name
- Abudefduf caudobimaculatus Okada & Ikeda, 1939

Species of fish

Abudefduf caudobimaculatus, commonly known as the Okinawa sergeant, is a species of damselfish in the family Pomacentridae. It is native to the Indo-Pacific, where it is believed to range from East Africa to Yakushima and Lord Howe Island, including Taiwan (where it occurs alongside its congeners Abudefduf nigrimargo and A. vaigiensis) and Indonesia. Although initially described in 1939, it was subsequently considered synonymous with Abudefduf vaigiensis, until a 2017 review conducted by Kunto Wibowo of the Indonesian Institute of Sciences, Hiroyuki Motomura of the Kagoshima University Museum, and Minoru Toda redescribed it as a valid and distinct species. Despite this, it is still listed by FishBase and WoRMS as a synonym of A. vaigiensis.
