= Abudefduf conformis =

Conservation status
- Least Concern (IUCN 3.1)

Scientific classification
- Kingdom: Animalia
- Phylum: Chordata
- Class: Actinopterygii
- Order: Blenniiformes
- Family: Pomacentridae
- Genus: Abudefduf
- Species: A. conformis

Binomial name
- Abudefduf conformis Randall & Earle, 1999

Species of fish

Abudefduf conformis is a species of damselfish in the family Pomacentridae. It is native to the eastern central Pacific Ocean, where it is known from the Marquesas Islands. The species typically occurs in reef environments at a depth of 0 to 12 m (0 to 39 ft).

Abudefduf conformis reaches 13.1 cm (5.2 in) in standard length. It is an omnivorous fish that is known to feed on algae, zooplankton, and various invertebrates. It is also oviparous, with individuals forming distinct pairs during breeding and males guarding and aerating eggs.

The species was described in 1999 by John Ernest Randall and John L. Earle alongside the species Plectroglyphidodon sagmarius, which also occurs in the waters of the Marquesas Islands. Its specific epithet, conformis, references its similarity to the closely related species Abudefduf vaigiensis.
