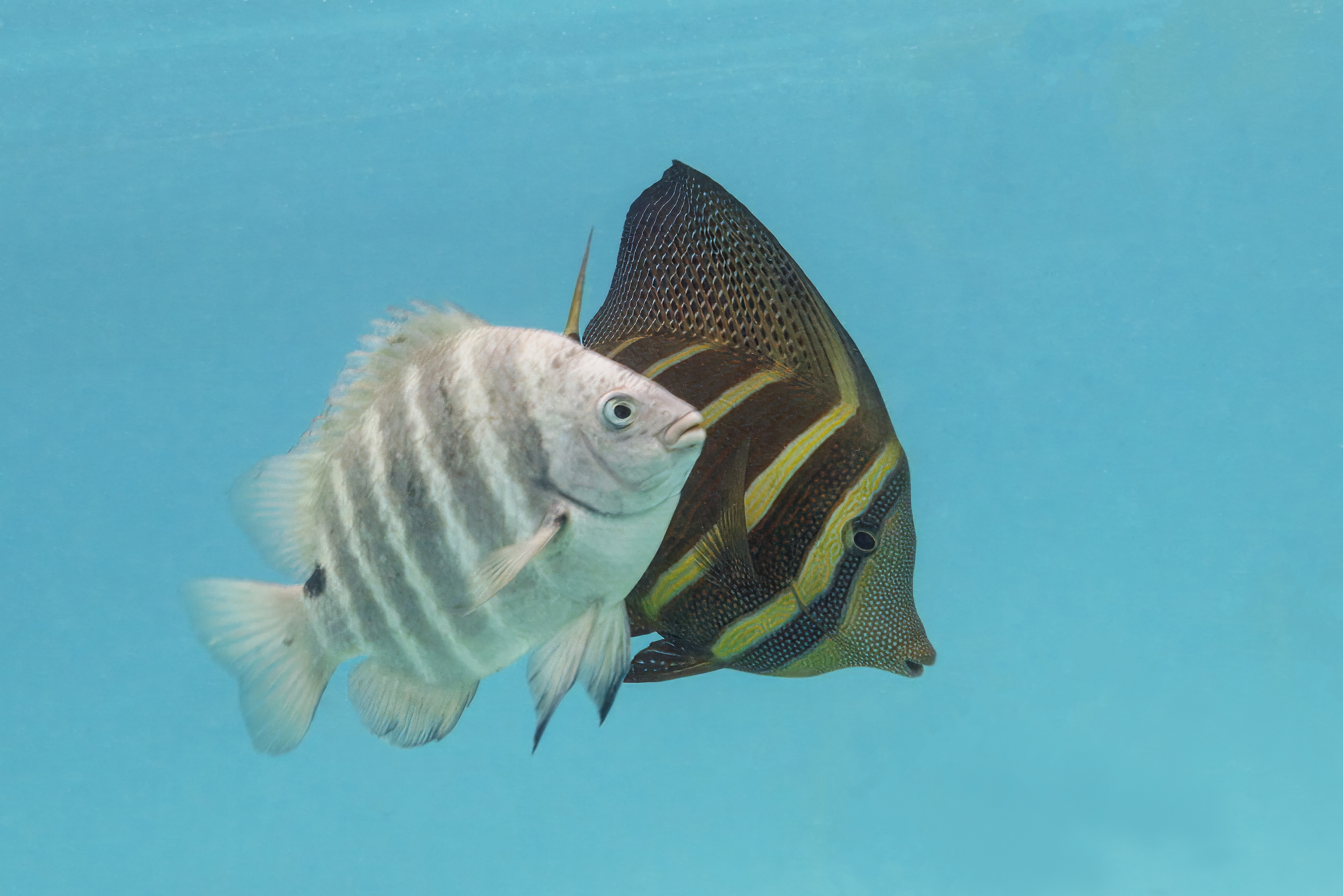
- Compared to a sailfin tang (right)

Conservation status
- Least Concern (IUCN 3.1)

Scientific classification
- Kingdom: Animalia
- Phylum: Chordata
- Class: Actinopterygii
- Order: Blenniiformes
- Family: Pomacentridae
- Genus: Abudefduf
- Species: A. sordidus

Binomial name
- Abudefduf sordidus (Forsskål, 1775)

Synonyms
- Abudefduf tridentatus; Chaetodon sordidus; Glyphisodon geant; Glyphisodon géant; Glyphidodon leucopleura

= Abudefduf sordidus =

Species of fish

Abudefduf sordidus, commonly known as the blackspot sergeant or kūpīpī in Hawaii, is a large solitary damselfish in the family Pomacentridae native to the tropical Indo-Pacific.

== Description ==
Blackspot sergeants are generally yellowish-grey in colour with six brown broad bars, six to seven narrow light bars and a black spot at the upper base of the tail. They can reach up to 24 cm (9.4 in) in total length and are known to live up to nine years in the wild.

== Habitat and behavior ==
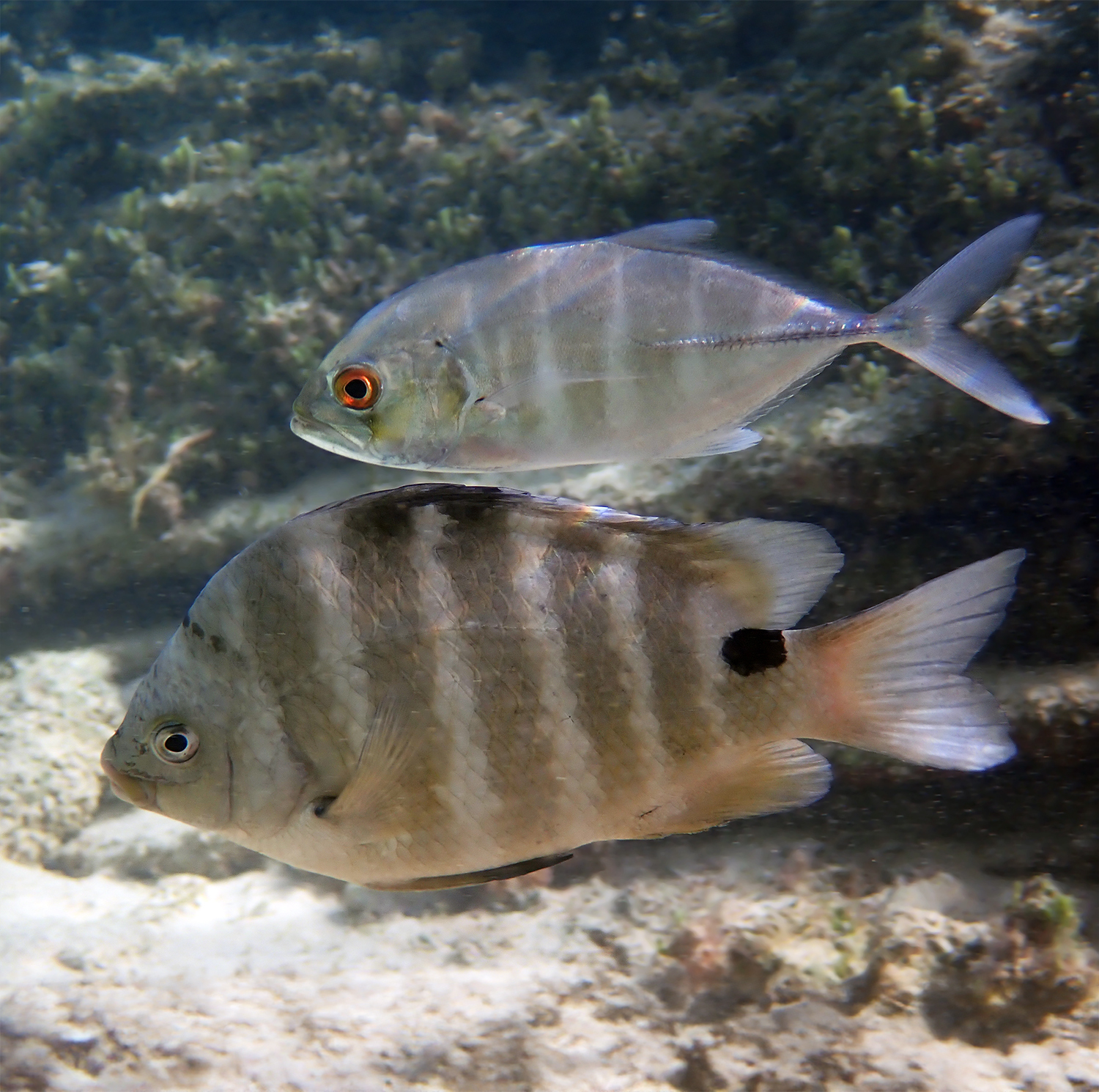
With a bigeye trevally, at Norfolk Island

Blackspot sergeants are common in tidepools and rocky shallow areas with moderate surge at a depth of 0 to 3 m (0 to 10 ft). Juvenile blackspot sergeants are common in tidepools where they feed on algae, small animals, and plankton. Once they mature and become bigger, they are known to move towards deeper areas with more surge. Blackspot sergeants are very territorially aggressive, especially towards other fish in tidepools. During the day they are often found near rocky areas, although at night they tend to take shelter under various objects. Blackspot sergeants are oviparous and males build a nest site in rocky areas to attract females. During this mating period they are believed to be especially aggressive.
