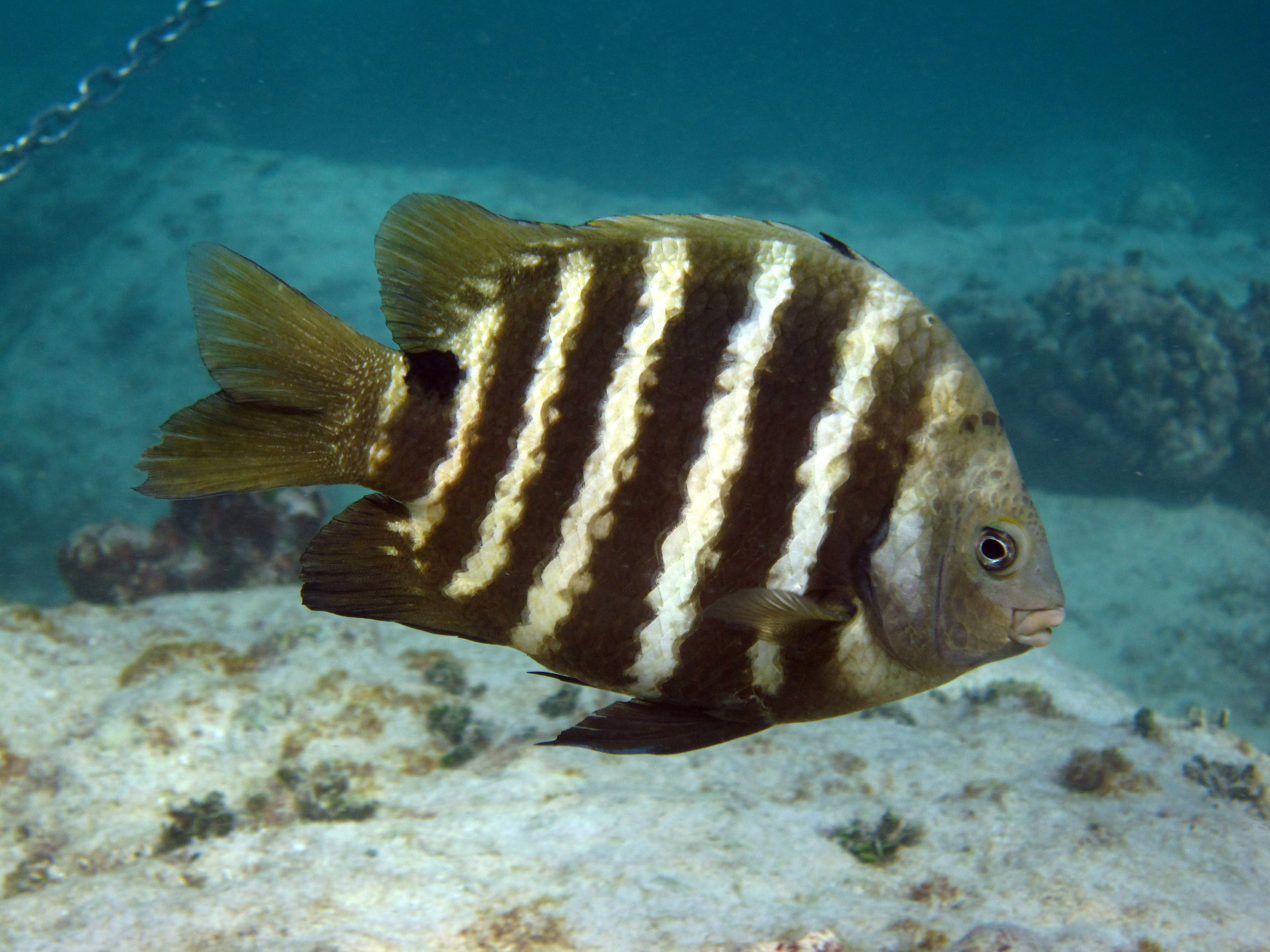
- Abudefduf sordidus Hawaii

Scientific classification
- Kingdom: Animalia
- Phylum: Chordata
- Class: Actinopterygii
- Division: Teleostei
- Order: Blenniiformes
- Family: Pomacentridae
- Subfamily: Pomacentrinae
- Genus: Abudefduf; Forsskål, 1775

Type species
- Chaetodon sordidus Forsskål, 1775

= Abudefduf =

Genus of fishes

Abudefduf is a genus of fish in the family Pomacentridae. They are also known as the sergeant-majors. The name Abudefduf comes from Arabic word ابو دفدوف abu, "the one with"; and def, "side", and the intensive plural ending -duf. Thus, the genus' name means "the one with prominent sides".

== General biology ==
The approximately 20 species of Abudefduf may be divided into planktivores and benthivores and three broadly pantropical clades. Two of the Abudefduf clades are primarily benthivorous and a third clade is composed of planktivores and is the most species-rich. Most diversification has occurred in the last 10 million years within this genus across all clades.

In their native environment, sergeant majors are very abundant, often being one of the dominant species in a locale. Research indicates that some Abudefduf species are undergoing range expansion towards more temperate waters in Australia.

== Species ==
The following 21 species are recognized in the genus Abudefduf:

Species	Common name	Image
Abudefduf abdominalis (Quoy & Gaimard, 1825)	Hawaiian sergeant	
Abudefduf bengalensis (Bloch, 1787)	Bengal sergeant	
Abudefduf caudobimaculatus Okada & Ikeda, 1939	Okinawa sergeant	
Abudefduf concolor (T. N. Gill, 1862)	Dusky sergeant	
Abudefduf conformis J. E. Randall & Earle, 1999		
Abudefduf declivifrons (T. N. Gill, 1862)	Mexican nightsergeant	
Abudefduf hoefleri (Steindachner, 1881)	African sergeant	
Abudefduf lorenzi Hensley & G. R. Allen, 1977	Black-tail sergeant	
Abudefduf margariteus (G. Cuvier, 1830)	Pearly sergeant	
Abudefduf natalensis Hensley & J. E. Randall, 1983	Natal sergeant	
Abudefduf nigrimargo Wibowo, Koeda, Muto & Motomura, 2018	Black margined-scale sergeant	
Abudefduf notatus (F. Day, 1870)	Yellowtail sergeant	
Abudefduf saxatilis (Linnaeus, 1758)	Atlantic sergeant-major	
Abudefduf septemfasciatus (G. Cuvier, 1830)	Banded sergeant	
Abudefduf sexfasciatus (Lacépède, 1801)	Scissortail sergeant	
Abudefduf sordidus (Forsskål, 1775)	Blackspot sergeant	
Abudefduf sparoides (Quoy & Gaimard, 1825)	False-eye sergeant	
Abudefduf taurus (Müller & Troschel, 1848)	Night sergeant	
Abudefduf troschelii (T. N. Gill, 1862)	Panamic sergeant-major	
Abudefduf vaigiensis (Quoy & Gaimard, 1825)	Indo-Pacific sergeant	
Abudefduf whitleyi G. R. Allen & D. R. Robertson, 1974	Whitley's sergeant	

== Gallery ==
Male breeding colouration

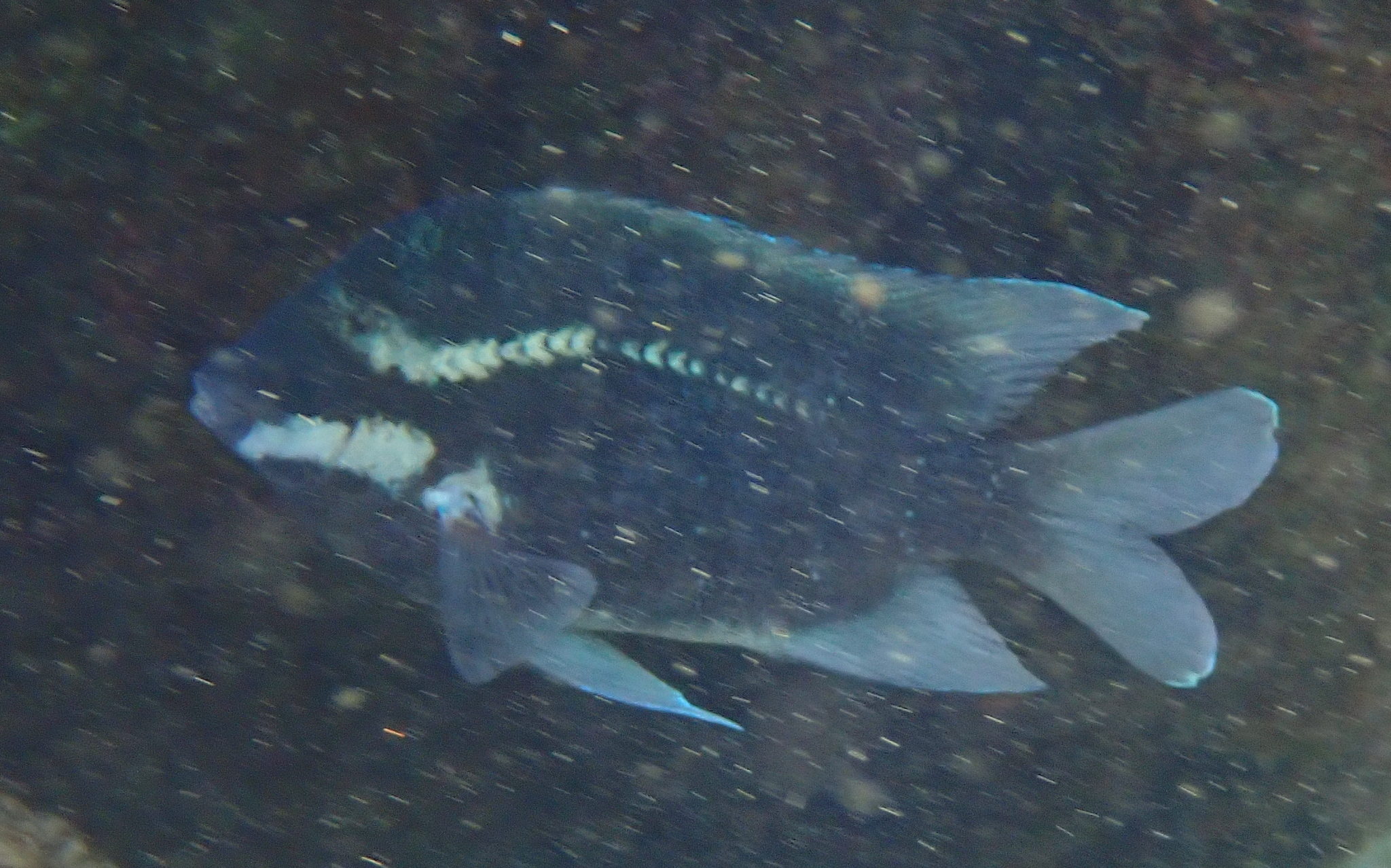
A. bengalensis

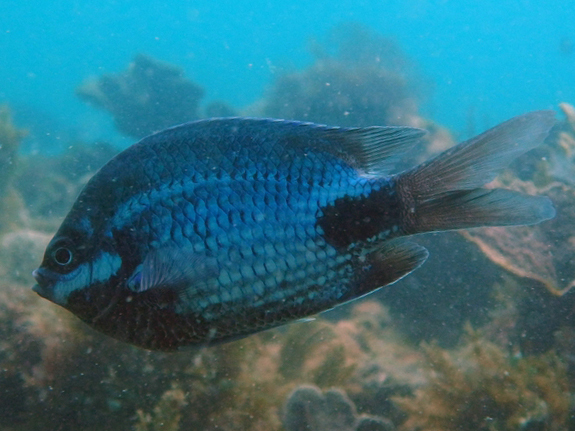
A. sparoides

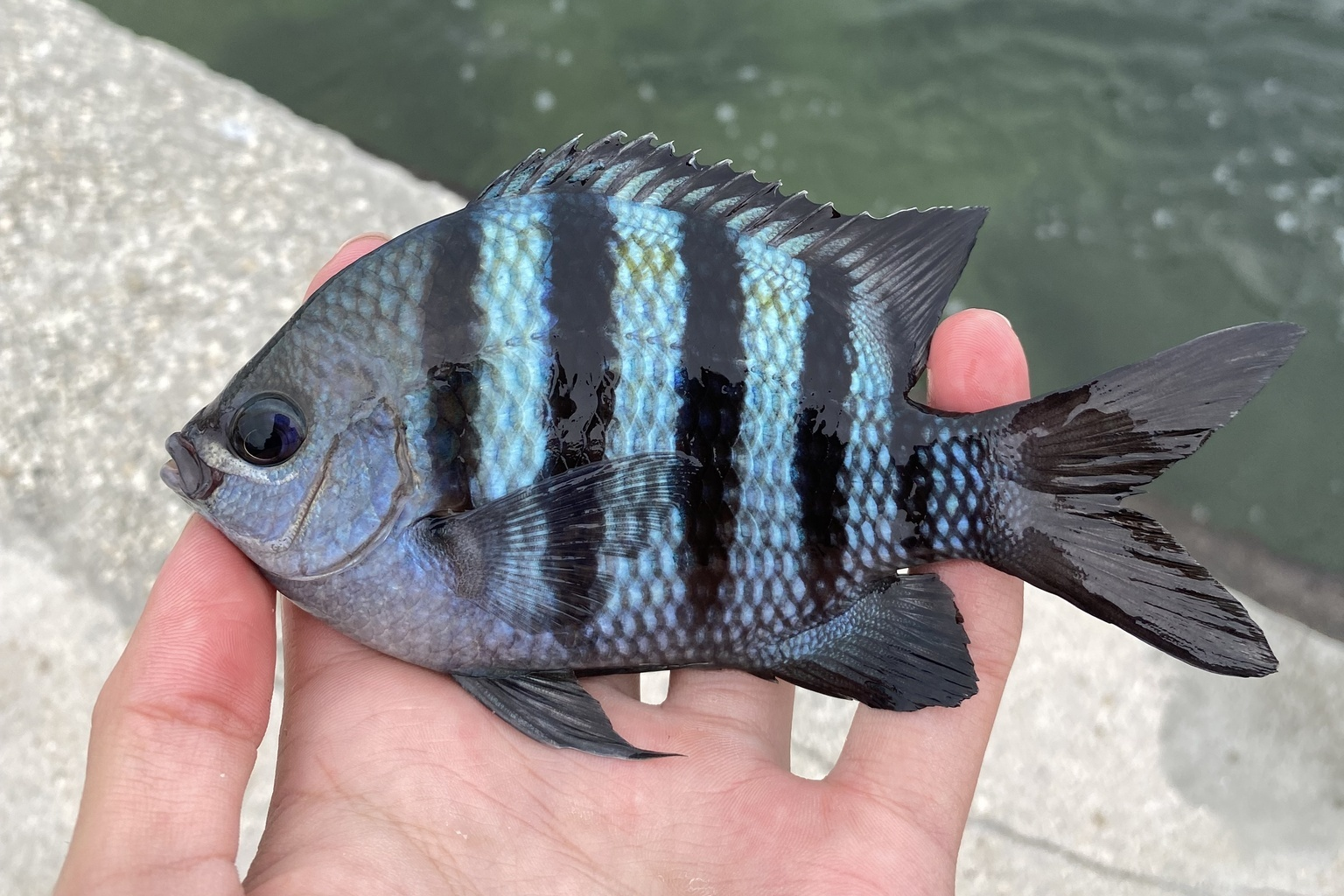
A. saxitilis

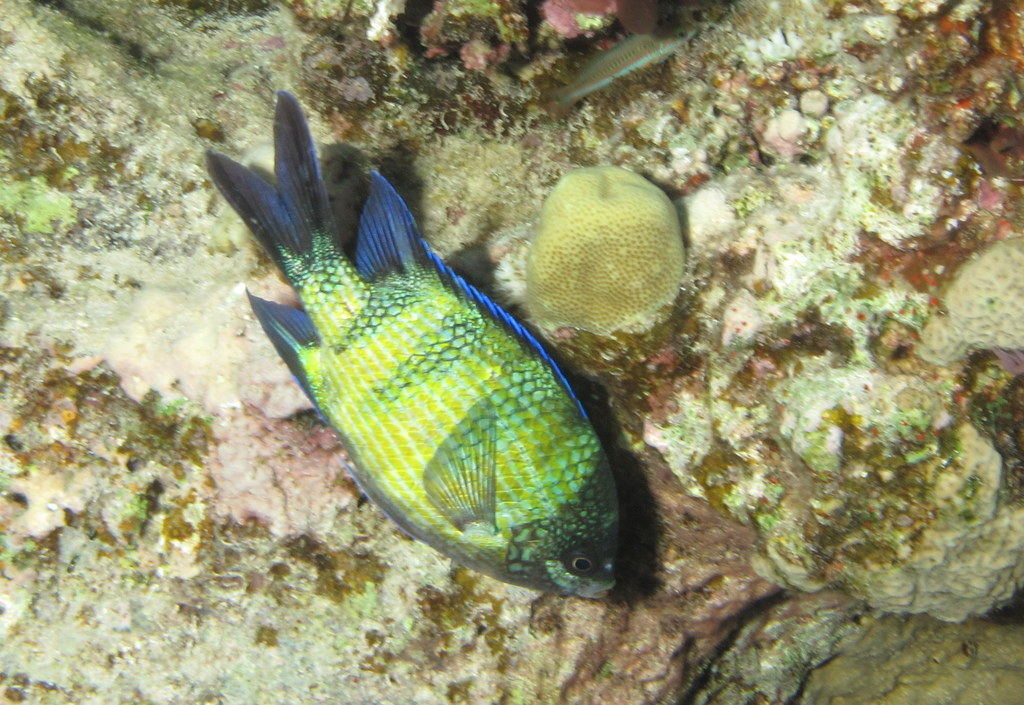
A. sexfasciatus
