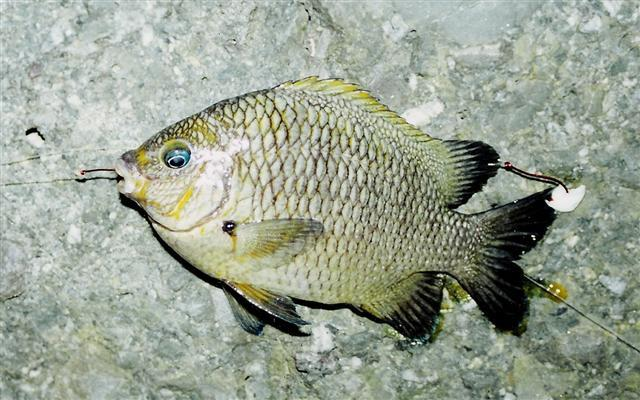

Conservation status
- Least Concern (IUCN 3.1)

Scientific classification
- Kingdom: Animalia
- Phylum: Chordata
- Class: Actinopterygii
- Order: Blenniiformes
- Family: Pomacentridae
- Genus: Abudefduf
- Species: A. declivifrons

Binomial name
- Abudefduf declivifrons (Gill, 1862)

Synonyms
- Euschistodus declivifrons

= Abudefduf declivifrons =

Species of fish

Abudefduf declivifrons, commonly known as the Mexican nightsergeant, is a species of damselfish in the family Pomacentridae native to the eastern Pacific Ocean. It is known only from Mexico, where it ranges from the Gulf of California to Acapulco. It is typically found in surge-exposed rocky reefs at a depth of 1 to 5 m (3 to 16 ft). It is an oviparous species, with individuals forming distinct pairs during breeding and males guarding and aerating eggs. The species reaches 18 cm (7.1 in) in standard length.
