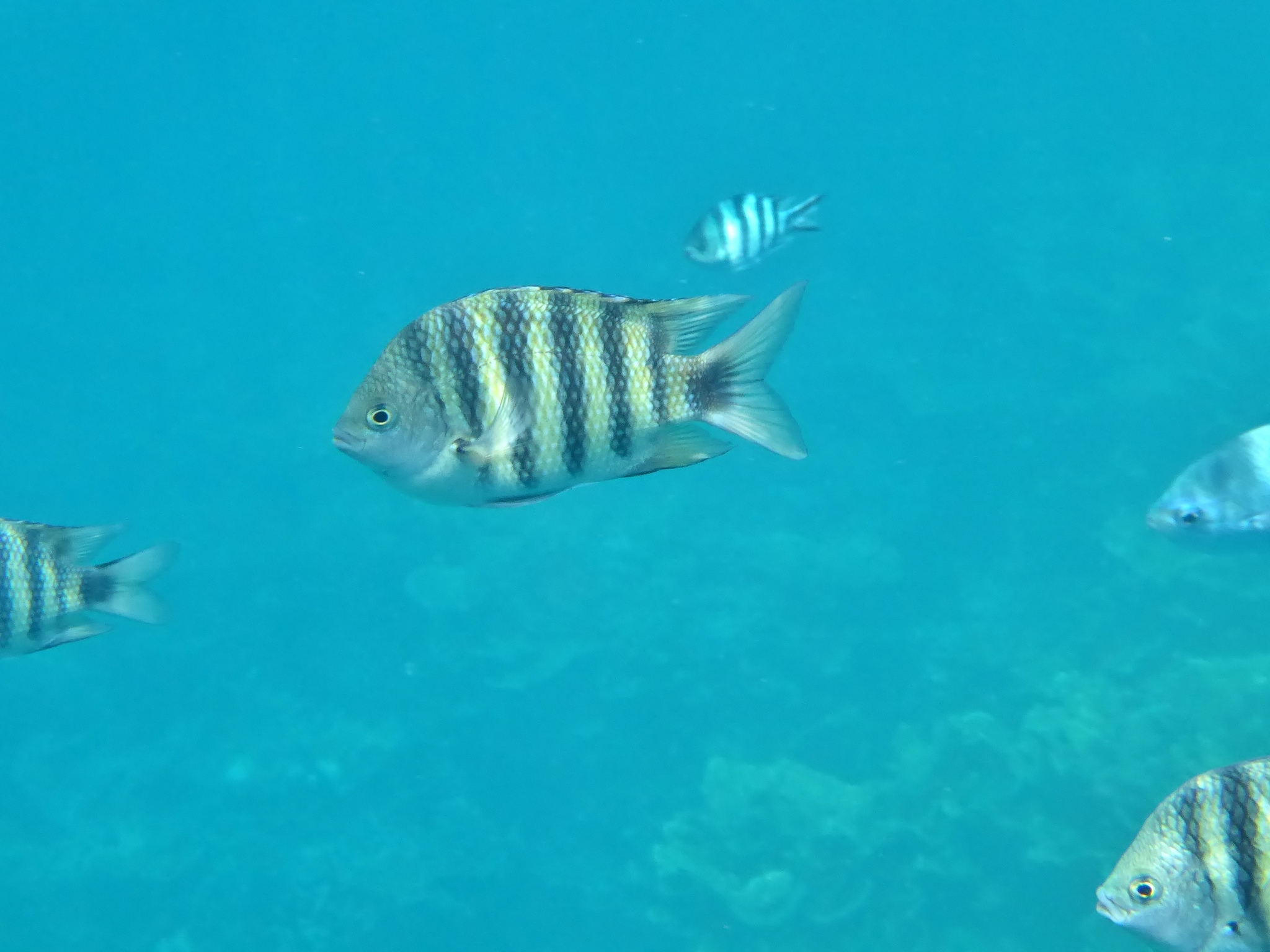

Conservation status
- Least Concern (IUCN 3.1)

Scientific classification
- Kingdom: Animalia
- Phylum: Chordata
- Class: Actinopterygii
- Order: Blenniiformes
- Family: Pomacentridae
- Genus: Abudefduf
- Species: A. lorenzi

Binomial name
- Abudefduf lorenzi Hensley & Allen, 1977

Synonyms
- Abudefduf lorentzi

= Abudefduf lorenzi =

Species of fish

Abudefduf lorenzi, commonly known as the black-tail sergeant, is a species of damselfish in the family Pomacentridae. It is native to the tropical western Pacific Ocean, where it ranges from the Philippines and the Maluku Islands to the Solomon Islands and Palau.

Adults of the species are typically seen along protected coasts at a depth of 1 to 6 m (3 to 20 ft), often near breakwaters and docks, where they tend to occur in loose aggregations, although individuals are also frequently seen widely scattered around nearshore areas. The species is known to be oviparous, with individuals forming distinct pairs during breeding and males guarding and aerating eggs. Abudefduf lorenzi reaches 18 cm (7.1 in) in total length.
