= Wild Life Sydney =

Wildlife park in Sydney, Australia

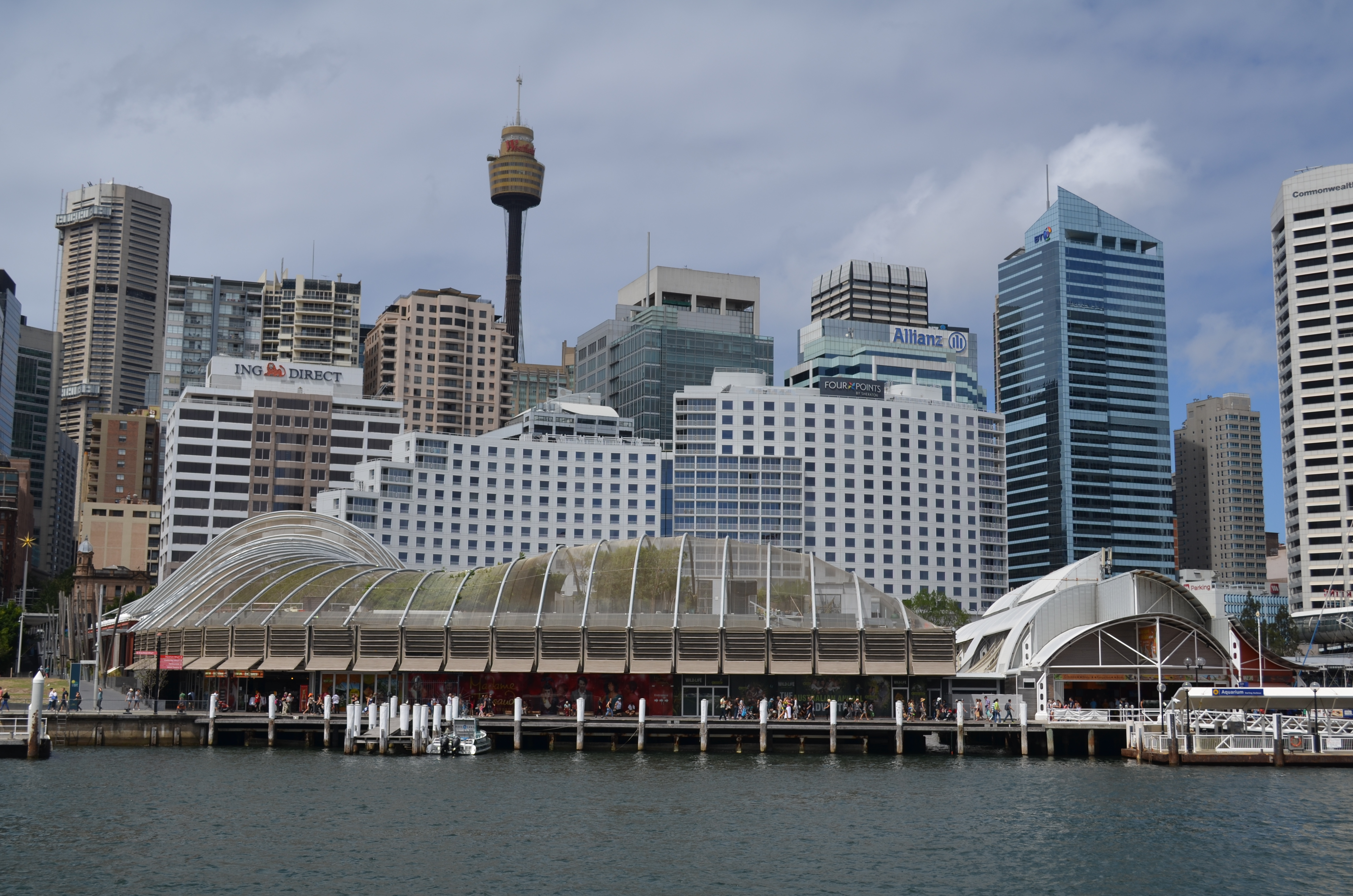
- Wild Life Sydney complex, pictured in 2014, across Darling Harbour
- Interactive map of Wild Life Sydney
- 33°52′12″S 151°12′6″E
- Date opened: September 2006
- Location: Darling Harbour, Sydney, New South Wales, Australia
- Land area: 7,000 square metres (75,000 sq ft)
- Memberships: ZAA; WAZA
- Major exhibits: 10 Zones
- Owner: Merlin Entertainments
- Public transit: : ////: Wynyard or; : as above //: Town Hall; : Circular Quay to Barangaroo; : L1: Convention or Pyrmont Bay
- Website: www.wildlifesydney.com.au

Wild Life Sydney Zoo (formerly Sydney Wildlife World) is a wildlife park in the Darling Harbour precinct, on the western edge of the Sydney central business district, Australia. Opened in September 2006, the zoo is located adjacent to a leisure and retail precinct that includes the Sea Life Sydney Aquarium and Madame Tussauds Sydney.

== History ==
In May 2006, Sydney Aquarium announced plans to expand the existing aquarium site, in order to incorporate a wildlife park. Following this announcement, and after the acquisition of the tourist attractions at Sydney Tower and of Manly Oceanarium, Sydney Aquarium changed its name to Sydney Attractions Group. Village Roadshow purchased Sydney Attractions Group in late 2007. UK attractions group Merlin Entertainments bought Sydney Wildlife World as part of its acquisition of Village Roadshow assets in March 2011.

The park changed its name to Wild Life Sydney and re-opened on 13 September 2011.

The attraction was named the best family-focused tourism at The Australian's 2007 Travel and Tourism Awards.

== Design ==
Construction began in November 2004 on the site, and was completed in August 2006. Wild Life Sydney is unusual for a zoo or wildlife park in that the public areas are almost entirely enclosed and air-conditioned. The A$52 million development features a 1 kilometre (0.62 mi) walkway which snakes through 7,000 square metres (75,000 sq ft) of enclosures.

The upper level exhibits are open-air, enclosed only by a large stainless steel mesh roof structure supported by curved beams, which were designed to look like the ribs of the rainbow serpent of Aboriginal myth when viewed from above. This open-air feature has enabled the exhibits to be landscaped naturally with live plants, including full-sized trees. The largest exhibit is the 800-square-metre (8,600 sq ft) semi-arid habitat of kangaroo walkabout, featuring 250 tonnes (280 short tons) of red sand trucked in from central Australia and full-sized bottle trees. This habitat houses Kangaroo Island kangaroos, echidnas, a quokka and koalas.

== Exhibits ==
Wild Life Sydney Zoo is divided into ten zones, containing the following exhibits:

Tricky Tongues and Treehouse

- Goodfellow's tree-kangaroo
- Short-beaked echidna

Devil's Den

- Tasmanian devil

Snake Shack

- Eastern brown snake
- Northern death adder
- Red-bellied black snake
- Tiger snake

Wallaby Cliffs

- Bare-nosed wombat
- Chestnut-eared finch
- Red-browed finch
- Spencer's goanna
- Yellow-footed rock wallaby

Daintree Rainforest

- Australian green tree frog
- Australian king parrot
- Boyd's forest dragon
- Brown cuckoo-dove
- Emerald dove
- Frill-neck lizard
- Green and golden bell frog
- Magnificent tree frog
- Plumed whistling duck
- Red-browed finch
- Red-legged pademelon
- Satin bowerbird
- Southern cassowary
- Topknot pigeon
- Wonga pigeon

Kangaroo Walkabout

- Australian king parrot
- Budgerigar
- Chestnut-breasted mannikin
- Chestnut-eared finch
- Cockatiel
- Kangaroo Island kangaroo
- Emerald dove
- Galah
- Gouldian finch
- Princess parrot
- Red-browed finch
- Spinifex pigeon
- White-browed woodswallow
- White-headed pigeon
- Wonga pigeon

Crocodile Billabong

- Banded rainbowfish
- Central bearded dragon
- Central netted dragon
- Crimson-spotted rainbowfish
- Dwarf bearded dragon
- Freshwater crocodile
- Frill-neck lizard
- Olive python
- Pig-nosed turtle
- Red-collared lorikeet
- Seven-spot archerfish
- Shingleback lizard

Platypus Pool

- Platypus
- Eastern water dragon

Night Fall

- Bilby
- Black-headed python
- Centralian knob-tailed gecko
- Eastern quoll
- Long-nosed potoroo
- Night skink
- Northern brown bandicoot
- Palyoora
- Rufous bettong
- Scorpion
- Spotted python
- Sugar glider
- Tawny frogmouth
- Woma python
- Yellow-bellied glider

Koala Rooftop (including Koala Rooftop Cafe)

- Cyclone Larry stick insect
- Giant burrowing cockroach
- Goliath stick-insect
- Mitchell's rainforest snail
- Queensland whistling tarantula
- Superworm
- Koala
- Wolf spider

== Experiences ==
Wild Life Sydney offers a Koala Photo experience where guests can get close to the Koalas and take a quality photo with them.
