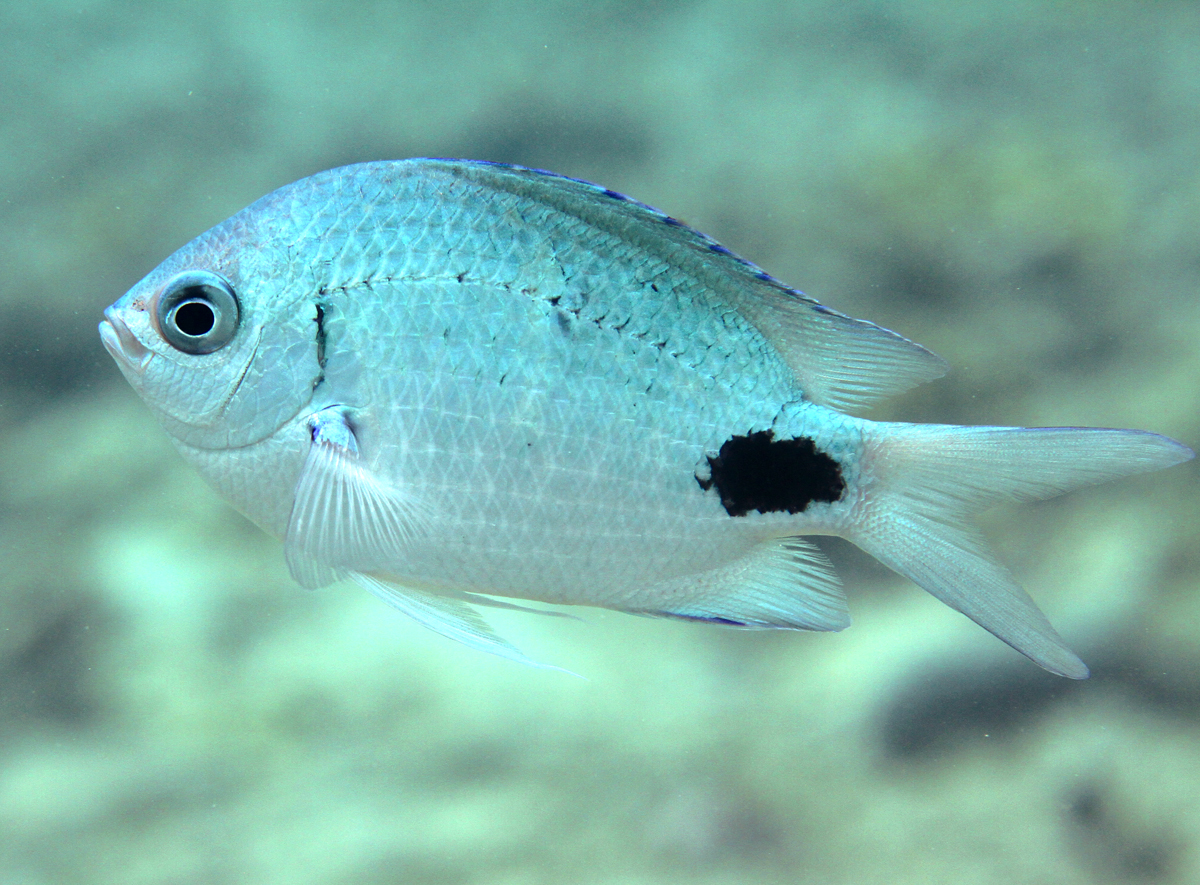

Conservation status
- Least Concern (IUCN 3.1)

Scientific classification
- Kingdom: Animalia
- Phylum: Chordata
- Class: Actinopterygii
- Order: Blenniiformes
- Family: Pomacentridae
- Genus: Abudefduf
- Species: A. sparoides

Binomial name
- Abudefduf sparoides (Quoy & Gaimard, 1825)

Synonyms
- Glyphidodon sparoides; Glyphisodon sparoides; Pomacentrus zanzibarensis

= Abudefduf sparoides =

Species of fish

Abudefduf sparoides, commonly known as the false-eye sergeant, is a species of damselfish in the family Pomacentridae. It is a tropical marine species native to the western Indian Ocean, where it ranges from Kenya to KwaZulu-Natal in South Africa, although it is also known from Aldabra, Madagascar, Mauritius, and Réunion. Adults of the species are generally found in rocky and coral-rich reef environments exposed to moderate wave action at a depth of 0 to 6 m (0 to 20 ft), although juveniles are typically seen in lagoons and other flat shallow environments. Individuals are typically seen alone or in loose aggregations.

Although Abudefduf sparoides feeds primarily on algae, it is also known to eat crustaceans and other invertebrates. It is an oviparous species, with individuals forming distinct pairs during breeding and males guarding and aerating eggs. The species can reach 16 cm (6.3 in) in total length.
