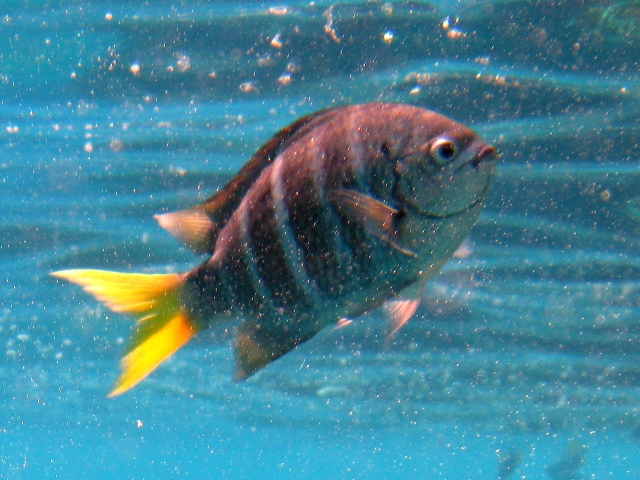

Conservation status
- Least Concern (IUCN 3.1)

Scientific classification
- Kingdom: Animalia
- Phylum: Chordata
- Class: Actinopterygii
- Order: Blenniiformes
- Family: Pomacentridae
- Genus: Abudefduf
- Species: A. notatus

Binomial name
- Abudefduf notatus (Day, 1870)

Synonyms
- Glyphidodon notatus Day, 1870; Abudefduf clarki Snyder, 1911; Indoglyphidodon abbotti Fowler, 1944; Chrysiptera paucifasciata Fowler, 1946

= Abudefduf notatus =

Species of fish

The yellowtail sergeant (Abudefduf notatus) is a species of damselfish in the family Pomacentridae native to the Indo-Pacific. It can grow to a maximum total length of 17 centimetres (6.7 in).

== Distribution and habitat ==
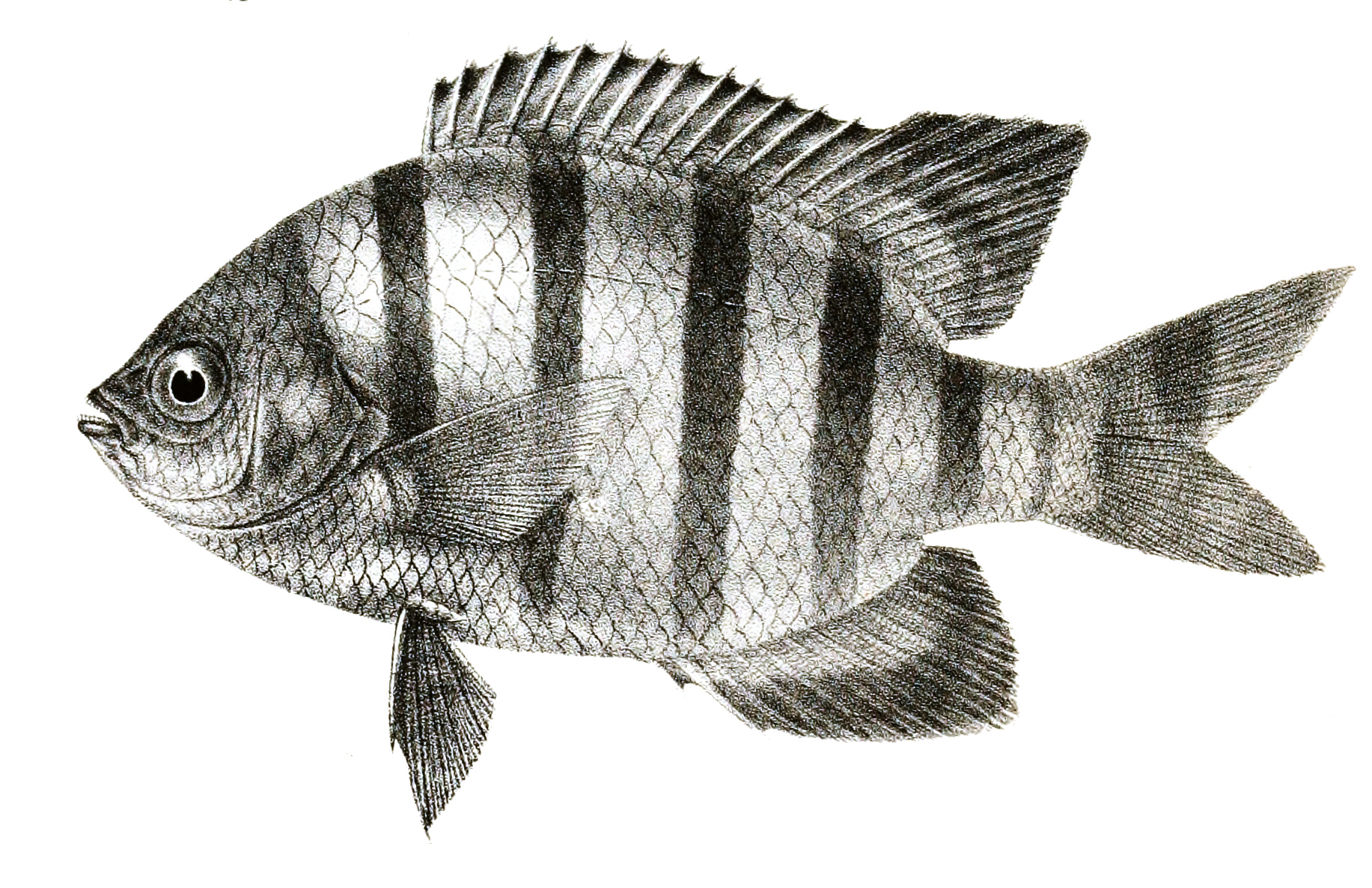

This species of damselfish is found in the Indo-Pacific. In the Indian Ocean, it occurs in the Gulf of Aden, the Arabian Sea, eastern Africa, Madagascar, Seychelles, the Maldives, Sri Lanka, the Andaman Sea, Indonesia, and Australia. In the Pacific Ocean, it occurs in the Gulf of Thailand, Indonesia, the Great Barrier Reef around Australia, the Philippines, Taiwan, Japan, New Caledonia, and various islands in the western Pacific Ocean. It typically occurs at depths of 1 to 12 m (3 to 39 ft). Adults live in coral reefs and lagoons while juveniles are found in the open sea.

== Description ==
The species can grow up to a maximum length of up to 17 cm (6.7 in). It is gray with 5 vertical black bands and a yellow caudal fin. It has 13 dorsal spines, 13 to 14 dorsal soft rays, 2 anal spines, and 13 to 14 anal soft rays.

== Ecology ==
=== Behavior ===
Abudefduf notatus forms roving aggregations which are noted to be rather difficult to approach. It is an oviparous species, with individuals forming distinct pairs during breeding and males guarding and aerating eggs.

== In the aquarium ==
Abudefduf notatus is found in the aquarium trade.
