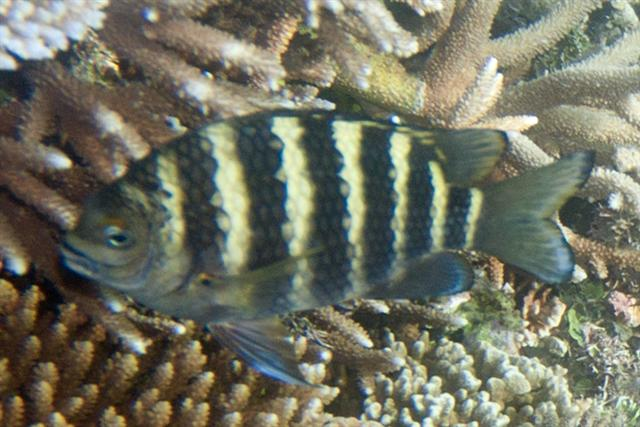

Conservation status
- Least Concern (IUCN 3.1)

Scientific classification
- Kingdom: Animalia
- Phylum: Chordata
- Class: Actinopterygii
- Order: Blenniiformes
- Family: Pomacentridae
- Genus: Abudefduf
- Species: A. septemfasciatus

Binomial name
- Abudefduf septemfasciatus (Cuvier, 1830)

Synonyms
- Abudefduf multifasciatus; Abudefduf paee; Chaetodon rotundus; Glyphisodon septemfasciatus

= Abudefduf septemfasciatus =

Species of fish

Abudefduf septemfasciatus, commonly known as the banded sergeant, is a species of damselfish in the family Pomacentridae. The species is native to the Indo-Pacific and can reach 23 cm (9.1 in) in total length.

== Habitat and ecology ==
Abudefduf septemfasciatus is a non-migratory marine fish associated with lagoons and coral reefs found at depths of 0 to 3 m (0 to 10 ft). The species is highly territorial and feeds on benthic algae and various invertebrates. It is oviparous, with individuals forming distinct pairs during breeding and males guarding and aerating eggs.

== Geographic distribution ==
Abudefduf septemfasciatus occurs in the Indo-Pacific, where it ranges from East Africa to the Line and Tuamotu Islands, north to southern Japan, and south to the southern Great Barrier Reef.

== Bibliography ==
- Eschmeyer, William N., ed. 1998. Catalog of Fishes. Special Publication of the Center for Biodiversity Research and Information, núm. 1, vol. 1–3. California Academy of Sciences. San Francisco, California, United States. 2905. ISBN 0-940228-47-5.
- Fenner, Robert M.: The Conscientious Marine Aquarist. Neptune City, New Jersey, USA : T.F.H. Publications, 2001.
- Helfman, G., B. Collette y D. Facey: The diversity of fishes. Blackwell Science, Malden, Massachusetts, USA, 1997.
- Hoese, D.F. 1986: . A M.M. Smith y P.C. Heemstra (eds.) Smiths' sea fishes. Springer-Verlag, Berlin, Germany.
- Maugé, L.A. 1986. A J. Daget, J.-P. Gosse y D.F.E. Thys van den Audenaerde (eds.) Check-list of the freshwater fishes of Africa (CLOFFA). ISNB, Bruselas; MRAC, Tervuren, Flandes; y ORSTOM, Paris, France. Vol. 2.
- Moyle, P. y J. Cech.: Fishes: An Introduction to Ichthyology, 4th edition, Upper Saddle River, New Jersey, USA: Prentice-Hall. Year 2000.
- Nelson, J.: Fishes of the World, 3a. edición. New York City, USA: John Wiley and Sons. Year 1994.
- Wheeler, A.: The World Encyclopedia of Fishes, 2nd edition, London: Macdonald. Year 1985.
