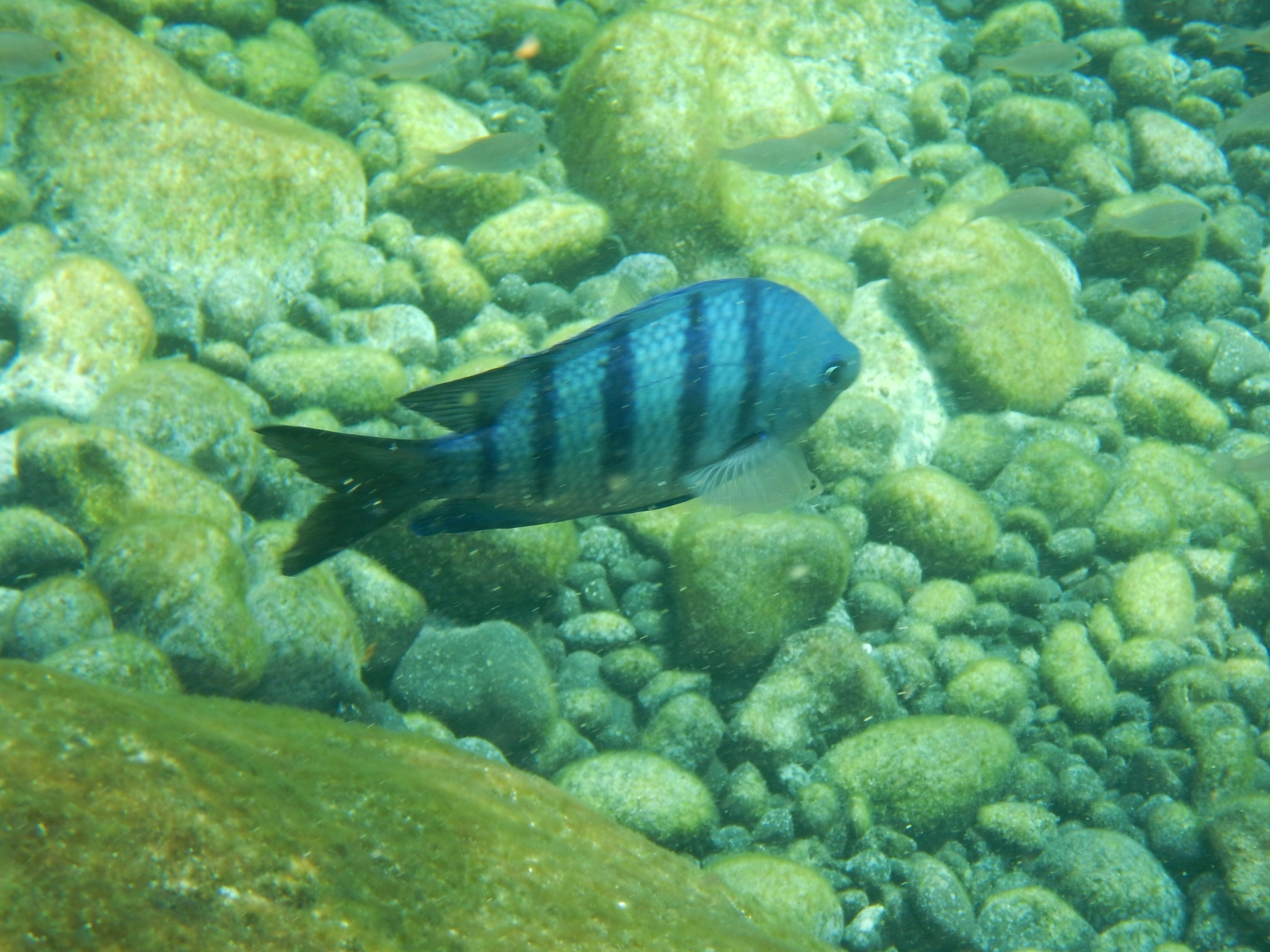

Conservation status
- Data Deficient (IUCN 3.1)

Scientific classification
- Kingdom: Animalia
- Phylum: Chordata
- Class: Actinopterygii
- Order: Blenniiformes
- Family: Pomacentridae
- Genus: Abudefduf
- Species: A. hoefleri

Binomial name
- Abudefduf hoefleri (Steindachner, 1881)

Synonyms
- Chromis bicolor; Gliphydodon hoefleri; Glyphidodon hoefleri

= Abudefduf hoefleri =

Species of fish

Abudefduf hoefleri, commonly known as the African sergeant, is a species of damselfish in the family Pomacentridae. It is native to the eastern Atlantic Ocean where it ranges from Senegal to Benin, including Cape Verde, Ilhéu das Rolas, and São Tomé Island. It is a littoral species typically encountered in rocky reef environments. The species is oviparous, with individuals forming distinct pairs during breeding and males guarding and aerating eggs. Abudefduf hoefleri reaches 20 cm (7.9 in) in total length.

In 2014, a specimen of Abudefduf hoefleri was collected in the waters of Malta, representing the first record of the species from the Mediterranean Sea, a region that it is not native to. While originally of uncertain identity within the genus Abudefduf, the specimen was identified as A. hoefleri after a 2015 analysis.
