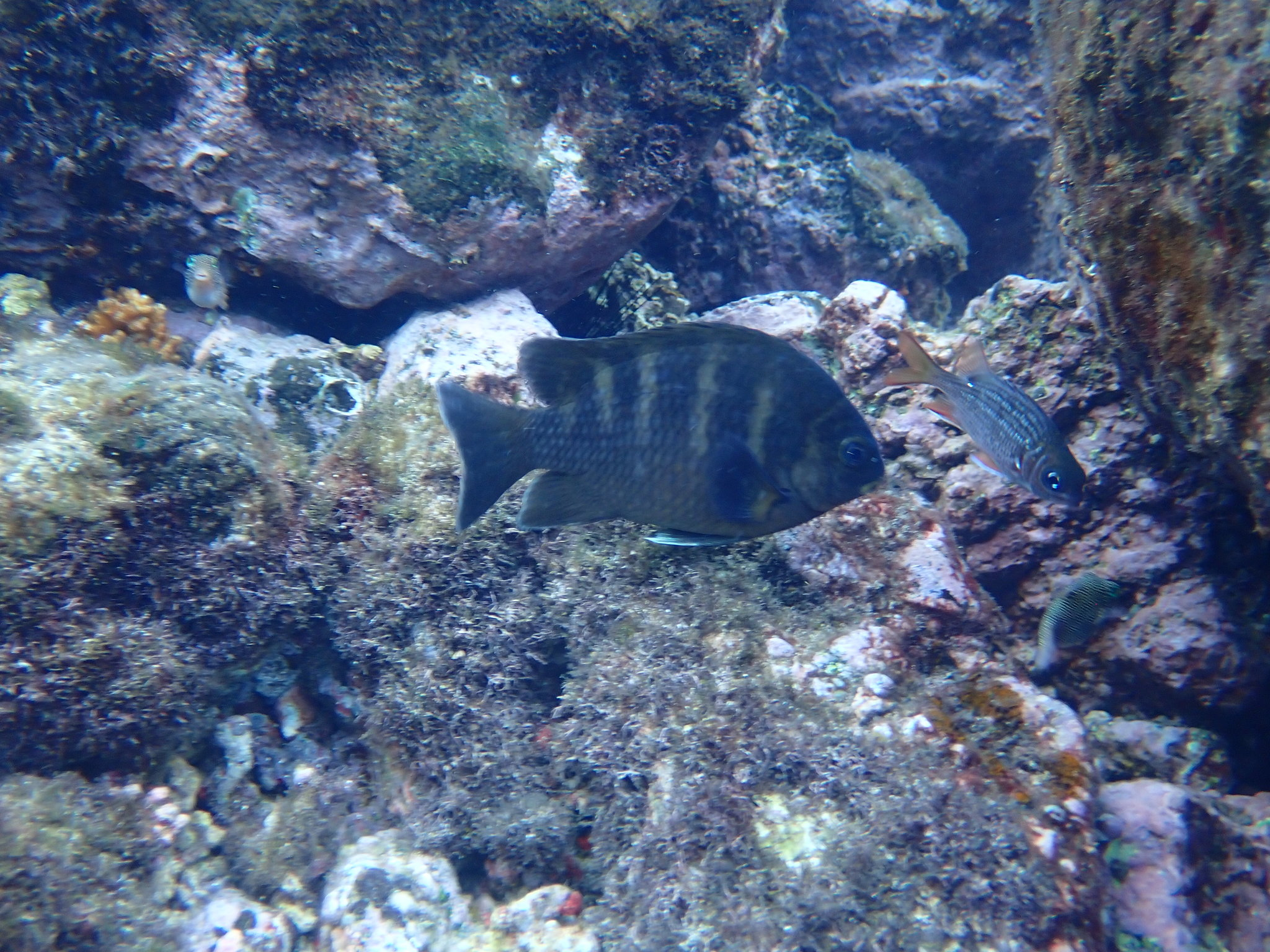

Conservation status
- Least Concern (IUCN 3.1)

Scientific classification
- Kingdom: Animalia
- Phylum: Chordata
- Class: Actinopterygii
- Order: Blenniiformes
- Family: Pomacentridae
- Genus: Abudefduf
- Species: A. taurus

Binomial name
- Abudefduf taurus (Müller & Troschel, 1848)

Synonyms
- Abudefduf analogus; Euchistodus analogus; Glyphidodon taurus; Glyphisodon taurus; Nexilarius taurus

= Abudefduf taurus =

Species of fish

Abudefduf taurus, commonly known as the night sergeant, is a species of damselfish in the genus Abudefduf. The species was originally described by Johannes Peter Müller and Franz Hermann Troschel in 1848. It is a large damselfish, reaching 25 centimetres (9.8 in) in total length.

== Distribution and habitat ==
Abudefduf taurus is native to tropical and subtropical waters in Atlantic Ocean, where it occurs off the coast of southern Florida and in the Caribbean Sea, as well as Cape Verde and the continental coast of Africa from Senegal to Angola. It has also been reported from northern South America. Adults of the species are typically found in rocky inshore reefs, in the vicinity of wave-cut rock ledges, tidepools, and limestone-rich coastal environments.

== Ecology ==
Abudefduf taurus is known to feed primarily on algae. Adults of the species also feed on Zoanthus and hydroids, while juveniles may also consume copepods. It is an oviparous species, with individuals forming distinct pairs during breeding and males guarding and aerating substrate-attached eggs.
