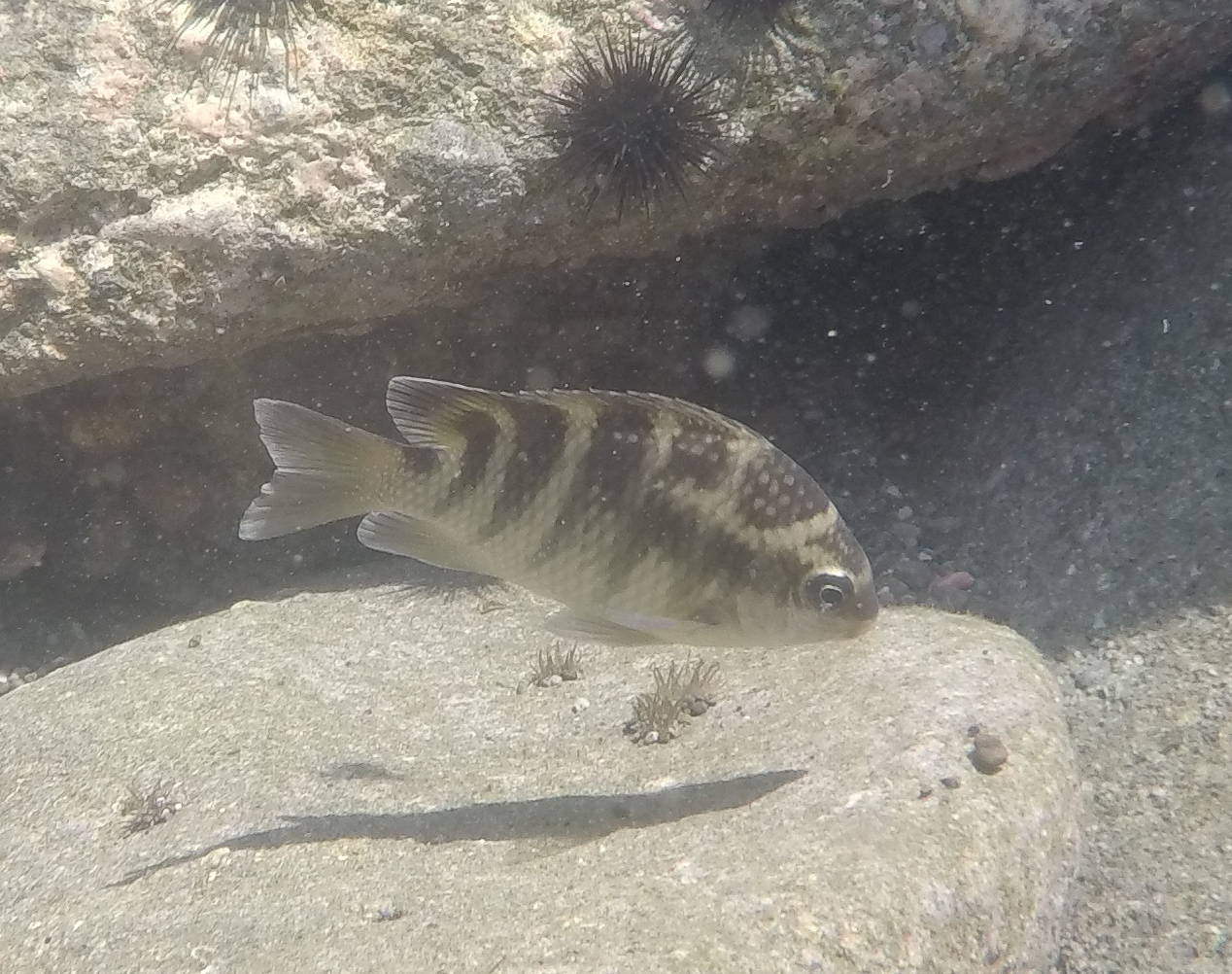

Conservation status
- Least Concern (IUCN 3.1)

Scientific classification
- Kingdom: Animalia
- Phylum: Chordata
- Class: Actinopterygii
- Order: Blenniiformes
- Family: Pomacentridae
- Genus: Abudefduf
- Species: A. concolor

Binomial name
- Abudefduf concolor (Gill, 1862)

Synonyms
- Euschistodus concolor Gill, 1862; Nexilarius concolor (Gill, 1862); Pomacentrus robustus Günther, 1862

= Dusky sergeant =

Species of fish

The dusky sergeant (Abudefduf concolor), also known as the night sergeant, is a species of damselfish in the family Pomacentridae endemic to the eastern Pacific Ocean. The species can reach 19 cm (7.5 in) in total length.

== Geographic distribution ==
Abudefduf concolor is found in the Eastern Pacific, from El Salvador to Peru, including the Galapagos, Cocos and Malpelo Islands.

== Ecology ==
Abudefduf concolor is a marine species found in shallow reef habitats, primarily rocky inshore reefs, at depths of up to 5 m (16 ft). It is an omnivorous fish that is also oviparous, with individuals forming pairs during breeding and males guarding and aerating eggs.
