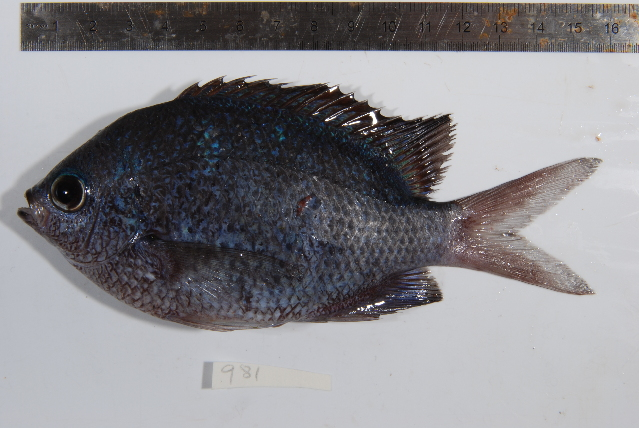

Conservation status
- Data Deficient (IUCN 3.1)

Scientific classification
- Kingdom: Animalia
- Phylum: Chordata
- Class: Actinopterygii
- Order: Blenniiformes
- Family: Pomacentridae
- Genus: Abudefduf
- Species: A. margariteus

Binomial name
- Abudefduf margariteus (Cuvier, 1830)

Synonyms
- Abudefduf rhyncholepis; Glyphidodon maculipinnis; Glyphidodon rhyncholepis; Glyphisodon margariteus

= Abudefduf margariteus =

Species of fish

Abudefduf margariteus, commonly known as the pearly sergeant, is a species of damselfish in the family Pomacentridae. It is native to the western Indian Ocean, where it is only known from Mauritius, Réunion and Rodrigues. Adults of the species inhabit coastal reefs exposed to moderate wave action at a depth of 2 to 8 m (7 to 26 ft). It is known to be oviparous, with individuals forming distinct pairs during breeding and males guarding and aerating eggs. The species reaches 16 cm (6.3 in) in standard length.
