= Abudefduf natalensis =

Conservation status
- Least Concern (IUCN 3.1)

Scientific classification
- Kingdom: Animalia
- Phylum: Chordata
- Class: Actinopterygii
- Order: Blenniiformes
- Family: Pomacentridae
- Genus: Abudefduf
- Species: A. natalensis

Binomial name
- Abudefduf natalensis Hensley & Randall, 1983

Species of fish

Abudefduf natalensis, known as the Natal sergeant, is a species of damselfish in the family Pomacentridae. It is native to the tropical western Indian Ocean, where it is known from Madagascar, Mauritius, Réunion, and South Africa from KwaZulu-Natal to the Eastern Cape. Adults of the species are typically found in rocky reefs at depths of 1 to 25 m (3 to 82 ft). The species is known to be oviparous, with individuals forming distinct pairs during breeding and males guarding and aerating eggs. Abudefduf natalensis reaches 17 cm (6.7 in) in total length.
