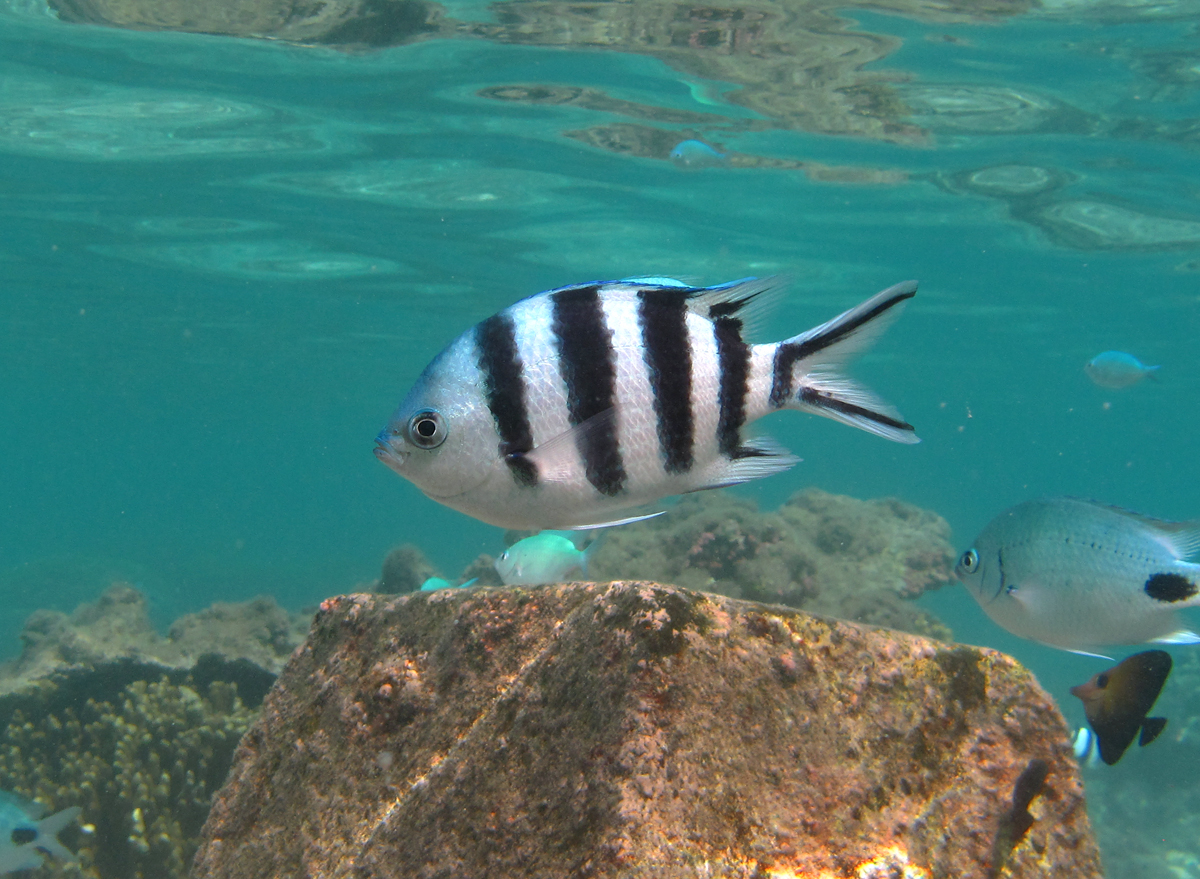

Conservation status
- Least Concern (IUCN 3.1)

Scientific classification
- Kingdom: Animalia
- Phylum: Chordata
- Class: Actinopterygii
- Division: Teleostei
- Order: Blenniiformes
- Family: Pomacentridae
- Genus: Abudefduf
- Species: A. sexfasciatus

Binomial name
- Abudefduf sexfasciatus Lacépède, 1801

Synonyms
- Glyphisodon coelestinus Cuvier, 1830; Labrus sexfasciatus Lacépède, 1801; Abudefduf coelestinus Cuvier and Valenciennes, 1830

= Scissortail sergeant =

Species of fish

The scissortail sergeant or striptailed damselfish (Abudefduf sexfasciatus) is a large damselfish in the family Pomacentridae. It earns its name from the black-striped tail and sides, which are reminiscent of the insignia of a military Sergeant, being similar to those of the sergeant major damselfish. It grows to a length of about 16 centimetres (6.3 in). Scissortail sergeants live on coral reefs at depths of up to 15 metres (50 ft) in tropical reaches, often living in a group surrounding a single head of coral. They are found on reefs in the Indo-Pacific region, including the Red Sea.

The fish feed upon the larvae of invertebrates, zooplankton, smaller fishes, crustaceans, and various species of algae. They are preyed upon by some members of the Labridae and Serranidae families. They lay their eggs in patches on a firm substrate and guard them vigorously till they hatch.

== Distribution and habitat ==
Scissortail sergeants are found in the Indo-Pacific including the Red Sea. Areas scissortail sergeants can be found in around the Indian Ocean include the Red Sea, eastern Africa, Madagascar, Seychelles, the Persian Gulf, India, Sri Lanka, the Bay of Bengal, the Andaman Sea, Indonesia, and Australia. Pacific Ocean populations are found in the Great Barrier Reef around Australia, the Gulf of Thailand, Indonesia, the Philippines, Taiwan, Japan, and various Pacific islands all the way to Hawaii. A single record was reported recently (2017) in the eastern Mediterranean Sea near Athens, Greece, likely a result of aquarium release.

Adults live in coral reefs while younger individuals live in the open sea. They are found at depths of 1 to 20 metres (3.3 to 65.6 ft).

== Description ==
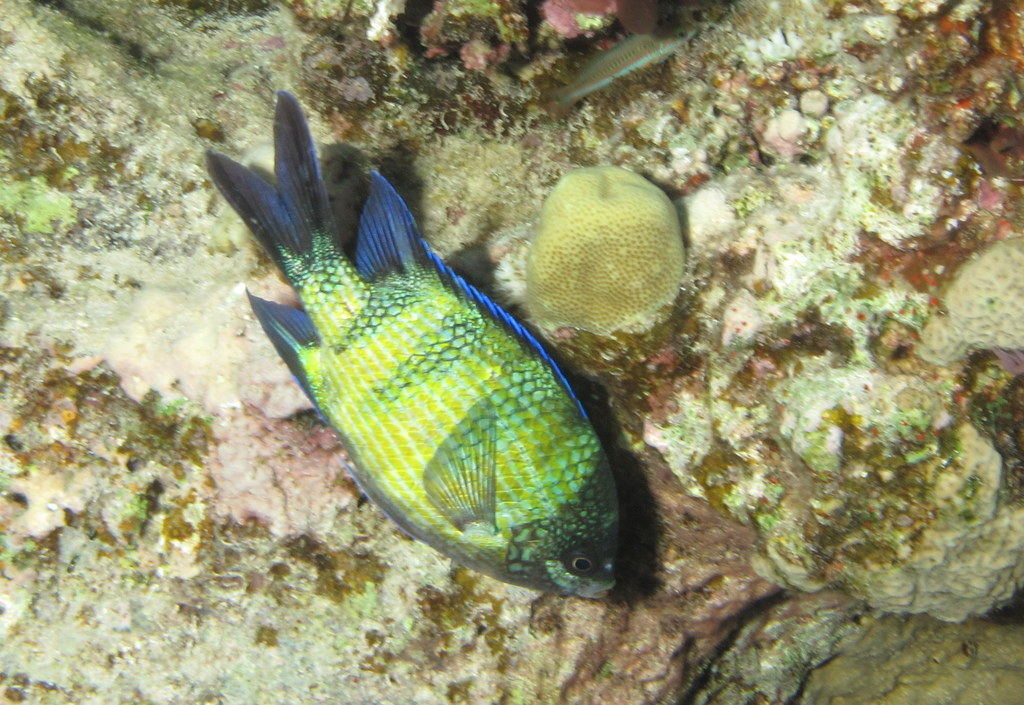
Nuptial livery, in the Red Sea

This fish is white. They have 5 vertical bands that are black. Two horizontal bands are present on the lobes of their tail. This fish can grow up to 22 centimetres (8.7 in) at maximum length.

== Ecology ==
=== Diet ===
This species fish feeds on algae, zooplankton, and sometimes its own eggs.

=== Behavior ===
This fish aggregates in large groups above coral.

== In the aquarium ==
This fish is popular in the aquarium trade. It is very aggressive and difficult to stay peaceful with other similar size fishes.

== Reproduction ==
=== Parental care ===
Like some other fish species, male scissortail sergeants are in charge of parental care. Males are polygamous and will collect eggs from up to 12 females while females spawn with a male and then abandon their eggs. Male parental care is more common than female- or bi-parental care in fish because territorial males are able to guard several clutches of eggs while simultaneously attracting new mates.

Male scissortail sergeants undergo brood cycling, in which they alternate between a mating phase and a parental phase. During the mating phase, males become gold in color and put on displays to attract egg-laying females. After two to three days in the mating phase, male scissortail sergeants will lose their gold color and transition into a four- to five-day parental phase. During the parental phase, males guard their eggs until they hatch. Filial cannibalism occurs during the parental phase.

=== Female choice ===
In order to select the best quality males and maximize their offspring survival rate, females will pool their eggs with other females into a single male's territory and create a larger brood. Studies have shown that pooling to create larger broods serves to not only decrease predatory effects, but also increases paternal investment. By increasing brood size, predation rate per individual decreases as a result of dilution effects. Also, males with larger broods are less likely to cannibalize their broods. It has also been hypothesized that egg pooling is a simple imitation tactic by which females confirm the quality of the male. By copying the spawning behavior of other females, females can minimize the search costs of finding a good mate.

In order to increase the propagation of their offspring, female scissortail sergeant must also actively select for good fathers. Female fish utilize multiple strategies in order to select for male parental quality: important factors include mate size, courtship rates, and male cannibalism. Some females will monitor a male's parental quality by laying small clutches of "test eggs" in a male's territory. This unusual tactic is a direct way for females to confirm the parenting ability of males who do not yet have any eggs in their brood. Females only lay one test clutch and return shortly after laying it. Capable males prove their parental quality by defending the brood and not cannibalizing the eggs. Test eggs are energetically expensive to create, so this strategy is typically only used by large females at the beginning of the mating phase.

=== Filial cannibalism ===
Filial cannibalism, the act of eating one's own offspring, is a common phenomena in territorial male fish. It occurs during the parental phase of brood cycling. Embryo mortality rates are generally attributed more to filial cannibalism than to predation effects because embryo predators are largely unsuccessful. Recent studies suggest that filial cannibalism, in fact, is an evolutionarily adaptive behavior. Baseline cannibalism is a result of males eating nonviable or damaged eggs, but males may cannibalize their current broods even more based on the costs and benefits of their parental investment. Raising offspring requires a large energy investment. Increased filial cannibalism occurs when the cost-to-benefit ratio of raising offspring is too high.

Filial cannibalism balances the loss of foraging opportunities. When guarding their territories, investment costs are lowest for large males with easy food access. When fathers are small and are unable to forage while caring for their broods, their offspring can be used as an extra food source to offset the energy requirements needed for parental care. By eating part of his brood, a male can improve his care for the remaining young in his brood. Supplementary feeding, however, decreases the energetic costs of raising a brood and can modulate cannibalistic tendencies in male scissortail sergeants. Experiments that supply provisional food like scissortail sergeant eggs and/or crab meat to brooding males lead to a decrease in cannibalism.

At the most extreme level, a male Scissortail Sergeant may cannibalize his entire brood. If the current brood is small and is not worth a male's continued investment, a male can choose to improve his future reproductive success by eating the rest of his current brood. Studies show that males who skip one mating cycle due to cannibalism or other environmental factors tend to invest more effort and have larger broods during the following season.

Cannibalism is also related to brood size and age. There is an increase in cannibalism when broods have low reproductive value. Smaller broods that are still early in the development cycle have relatively low reproductive value and are more likely to be cannibalized. Studies found that males who had their clutches reduced the first day of the parental phase were more likely to cannibalize the remaining eggs. Males whose broods are reduced on the third day of the parental phase, however, do not increase cannibalism because parental care is less costly closer to the hatch date. Males that cannibalized their broods early on in the development process, however, may mate with more females and rebrood during the same season.

Filial cannibalism is also influenced by the father's relatedness to his brood. The benefits of parental investment decrease with decreasing relatedness. Sneaking by other males is a common occurrence in male scissortail sergeants. Sneaking behavior, as defined by opportunistic males that attempt to fertilize some eggs during another spawning pair, decreases the relatedness of a brood to its father. Decreased benefits due to relatedness increase the probability of cannibalism. When there are many other non-nesting males around a male's territory, scientists see increased cannibalism and reduced parental care. This finding is attributed to the increased probability of sneaking.
