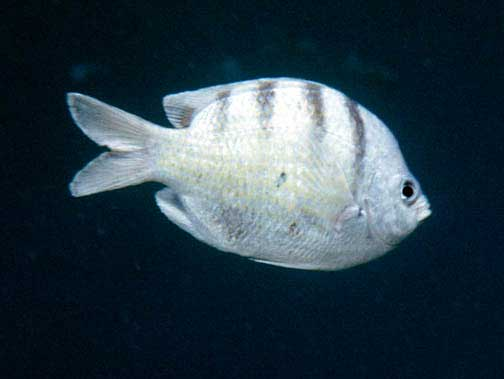

Conservation status
- Least Concern (IUCN 3.1)

Scientific classification
- Kingdom: Animalia
- Phylum: Chordata
- Class: Actinopterygii
- Order: Blenniiformes
- Family: Pomacentridae
- Genus: Abudefduf
- Species: A. abdominalis

Binomial name
- Abudefduf abdominalis (Quoy & Gaimard, 1825)

Synonyms
- Glyphisodon abdominalis Quoy & Gaimard, 1825

= Green damselfish =

Species of fish

The green damselfish (Abudefduf abdominalis), also known as the Hawaiian sergeant major, is a non-migratory fish of the family Pomacentridae. This fish also goes by the name maomao It occurs in the Pacific Ocean in the vicinity of the Hawaiian Islands, Midway Island and Johnston Atoll. It can grow to a maximum total length of 30 centimetres (12 in).

Adults of the species are typically found in quiet waters with rocky bottoms in inshore and offshore reefs at a depth of 1 to 50 m (3 ft 3 in to 164 ft 1 in), although juveniles may sometimes be found in surge pools. It is a benthopelagic species, with adults being known to form schools. The species feeds on a variety of algae and zooplankton. It is known to be used as a food source for humans in Hawaii. It occasionally appears in the aquarium trade.

== Breeding ==
Abudefduf abdominalis is oviparous, with distinct pairing occurring during breeding. Abudefduf abdominalis is known for being a species of fish that are polygamous during their breeding time. Eggs are demersal and adhere to the substrate, with males guarding and aerating the eggs. Breeding cycles depend on the availability of food. It is known to hybridise with Abudefduf vaigiensis which has been introduced to Hawaiian coastal waters. Abudefduf abdominalis are capable of spawning year round, though are most active during mid December all through July. To enchant the female of the species, males will take what are called "nuptial colors" like dark blue and have light yellow bars and will perform various dances to attract a mate. Such dances include swimming in zig-zag patterns, swimming in loops, or floating head down.

== Appearance ==
These fishes can range from 7 inches to 9 inches on average. The juveniles start out with a yellow tinge, which turns greenish white as they mature. The rear fin has a black marking. During breeding the males turn blue and their black bars begin to fade into a gray instead.

== Diet ==
These fish are known to nibble on zooplankton, Copepods usually and on occasion they'll also eat algae.

== Predators ==
Some fish that prey on this species include but are not limited to the Milletseed Butterflyfish, Racoon Butterflyfish, and the Black Triggerfish. Some predators like the Milletseed Butterflyfish will travel close behind divers to find a Hawaiian Sergeant nest and feast on the eggs.
