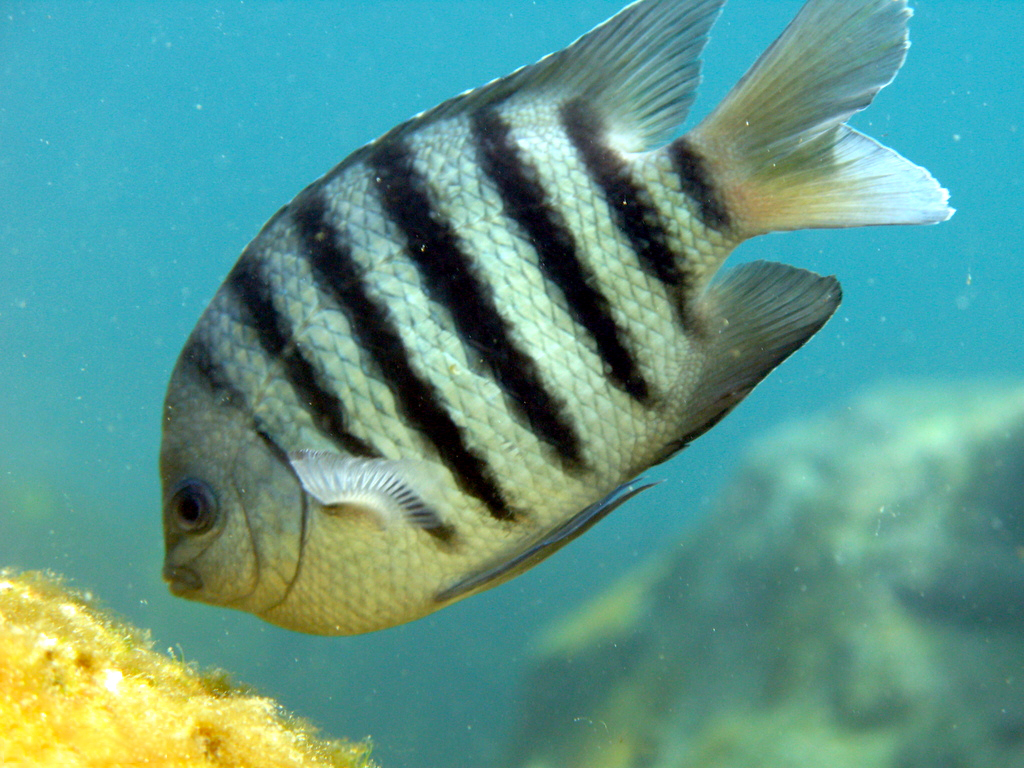

Conservation status
- Least Concern (IUCN 3.1)

Scientific classification
- Kingdom: Animalia
- Phylum: Chordata
- Class: Actinopterygii
- Order: Blenniiformes
- Family: Pomacentridae
- Genus: Abudefduf
- Species: A. bengalensis

Binomial name
- Abudefduf bengalensis (Bloch, 1787)

Synonyms
- Chaetodon bengalensis; Glyphidodon affinis; Glyphisodon palmeri; Labrus macrogaster

= Abudefduf bengalensis =

Species of fish

Abudefduf bengalensis, known as the Bengal sergeant or the narrow-banded sergeant major, is a species of damselfish in the family Pomacentridae. It is a marine species native to the tropical Indo-Pacific, where it ranges from the eastern Indian Ocean to Australia and Japan in the Pacific Ocean. Despite its wide range in the Indian Ocean, the Bengal sergeant is not known to occur in the Red Sea. Adults of this species are typically found in coral reef and lagoon environments at a depth of 1 to 6 m (3 to 20 ft), where they typically occur singly or in small groups.

Bengal sergeants feed primarily on algae, gastropods, and crabs. The species is known to be highly territorial, and distinct pairs of individuals are formed during breeding. It is also oviparous, with males guarding and aerating eggs. The species reaches 17 cm (6.7 in) in total length.
