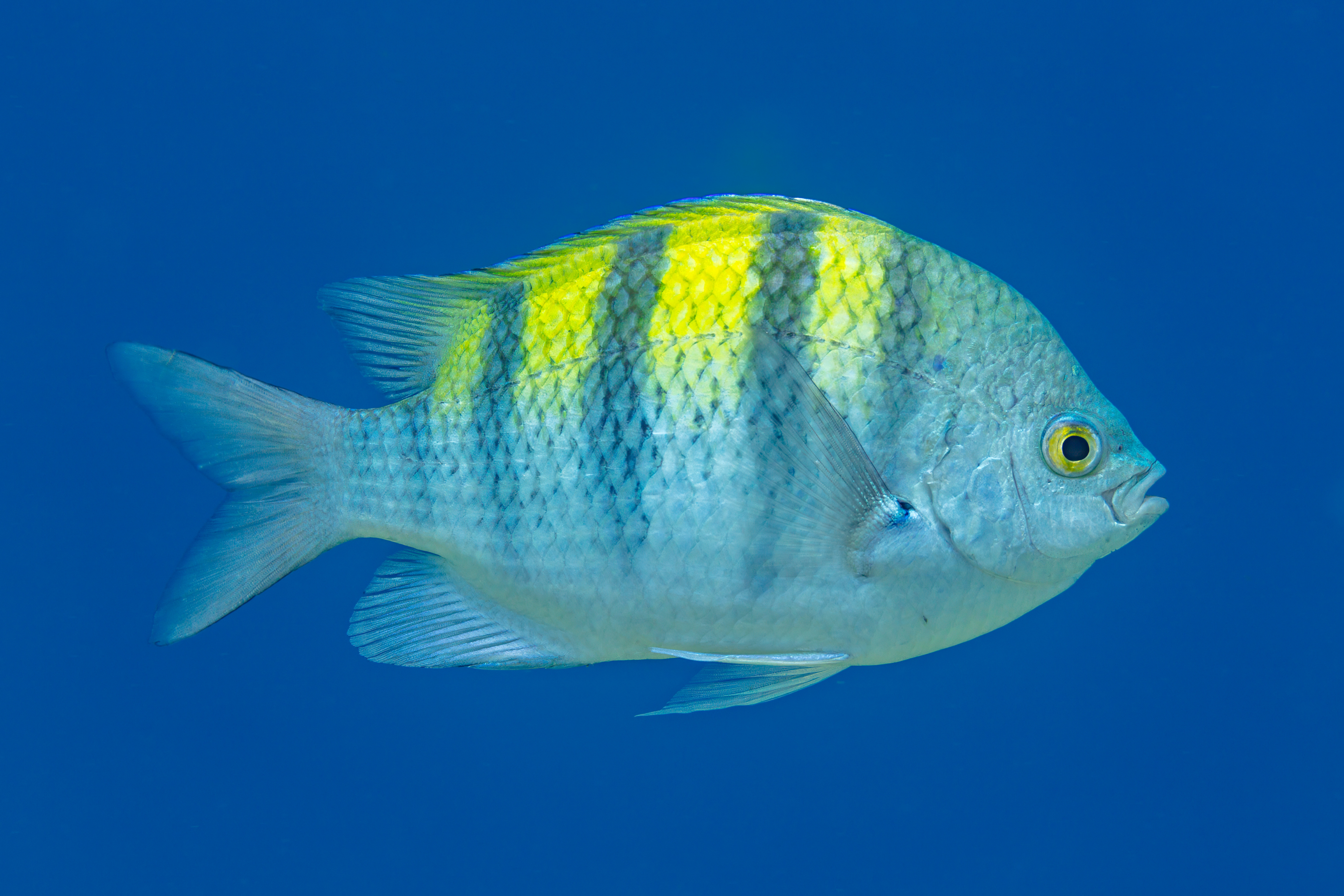

Conservation status
- Least Concern (IUCN 3.1)

Scientific classification
- Kingdom: Animalia
- Phylum: Chordata
- Class: Actinopterygii
- Order: Blenniiformes
- Family: Pomacentridae
- Genus: Abudefduf
- Species: A. troschelii

Binomial name
- Abudefduf troschelii (Gill, 1862)

Synonyms
- Glyphidodon troschelii Gill, 1862

= Abudefduf troschelii =

Species of fish

Abudefduf troschelii, the Pacific sergeant major or Panama sergeant major, is a species of damselfish belonging to the family Pomacentridae that can be identified by the pronounced black stripes on the lateral sides of the fish. Its specific name honors the zoologist Franz Hermann Troschel (1810-1882). It is native to the neritic pelagic zone of the shallow water coral reefs in the Eastern Pacific Ocean and they are an omnivorous species feeding on plankton and algae attached to their coral habitat. Abudefduf troschelii is a sister-species of A. saxatilis but have diverged from each other since the uplift of the isthmus of Panama, separated by the rise of the Panama land bridge 3.1 to 3.5 million years ago. Males, like in many other marine species, take care of and defend newborn A. troschelii after they have been hatched by eggs from the female. There are currently no major threats to the species and there is no indication of a current decline in its population size. The IUCN Red List lists this damselfish as being of "least concern".

== Physical characteristics ==
Abudefduf troschelii have five dark bands on the lateral surfaces of the body with dorsal yellow spaces in between. These dark bands spread towards the ventral side of the fish creating black stripes. This eye catching coloration of the fish is one of the reasons that they are popular aquarium fishes. Their pectoral fins are lengthened, slender, and paddle-shaped allowing them to swim fast and change direction quickly around coral reefs. This is a common morphology among coral reef living fish. These pectoral fins are structured with a long, straightened hydrodynamic leading edge, and a rounded hydrodynamic trailing edge allowing them to easily maneuver around pieces of rock and coral. Compared to other damselfish, A. troschelii have relatively large eyes, and a long angular shaped head. The mouth of this species is located in a higher position on the frontal side of the fish compared to other damselfish, allowing A. troschelii to successfully feed on suspension floating plankton in the oceanic pelagic zone.

== Habitat and distribution ==
Abudefduf troschelii are found widely throughout the Eastern Pacific and are endemic to this area. They are commonly found in Colombia, Costa Rica, Ecuador, El Salvador, Guatemala, Honduras, Mexico, Nicaragua, Panama, Peru, and the United States to name a few. In these places, this species is abundant in coralline and sandy bottoms, but they can also be found at rocky bottoms and tide pools where they are usually found in large aggregations. Furthermore, this species can be found in the pelagic area of the neritic feeding on plankton. This neritic area where A. troschelii are commonly found, is made up of massive corals, deep rocky walls, and shallow exposed reef.

== Diet ==
These Eastern Pacific damselfish are feeders whose diet consists mainly of plankton in the pelagic zone and mid-water, but they also graze on benthic invertebrates and algae on their coral reef habitat. These feeding tendencies make them an omnivorous species. The physical structure of the A. troschelii mouth is one that it small but conveniently located so that it can easily feed on small plankton suspended in the water column and small bits of algae attached to pieces of benthic structure.

== Reproduction ==
Abudefduf troschelii spawn within nine days on either side of the new moon, and hatching occurs after four days where newborns are hatched during the hour after sunset. Extended periods of spawning can occur during seasonal increases in plankton productivity. This seasonal increase is due to upwelling and leads to an increase in egg production of the species. During a wet season, this reproductive process lasts three to four days. In a dry season, on the other hand, this process can be drawn out to 8 days. Due to this, reproductive patterns are found within A. troschelii populations particularly during wet seasons. Reproductive patters of this species is beneficial because a hatching taking place at dusk results in favorable tides allowing newborns to be transported away from reef-based predators found at the time of a new moon. Furthermore, reproductive patterns reduces the risk of predation of unhatched embryos found at nests. During this spawning period, the male A. troschelii mates, chosen by the females, will clear and defend spawning sites of pieces of dead coral and rock. This area is where the females will eventually lay their adhesive eggs soon to be defended by the male. Male A. troschelii mate with one to five females for 1 to 3 days resulting in 250,000 eggs, and these males defend the young for 4 to 5 days following the spawning. When the newborn fish are hatched, the young have well-developed eyes and are able to control and utilize directive swimming. Like other damselfishes, larvae spend several weeks in open-water plankton and then settle on reefs as juveniles.

== Predators ==
There are no real major threats to the overall population size of A. troschelii, but they are in fact a small percent of the yellow snapper (Lutjanus argentiventris) diet. Another predator of this species is the Thalassoma lucasanum, the neotropical pacific wrasse, which forms groups of 30 to 300 individuals that will typically overwhelm the parental defense of A. troschelii embryos, ultimately gaining access to an easy unprotected, solitary food source.
