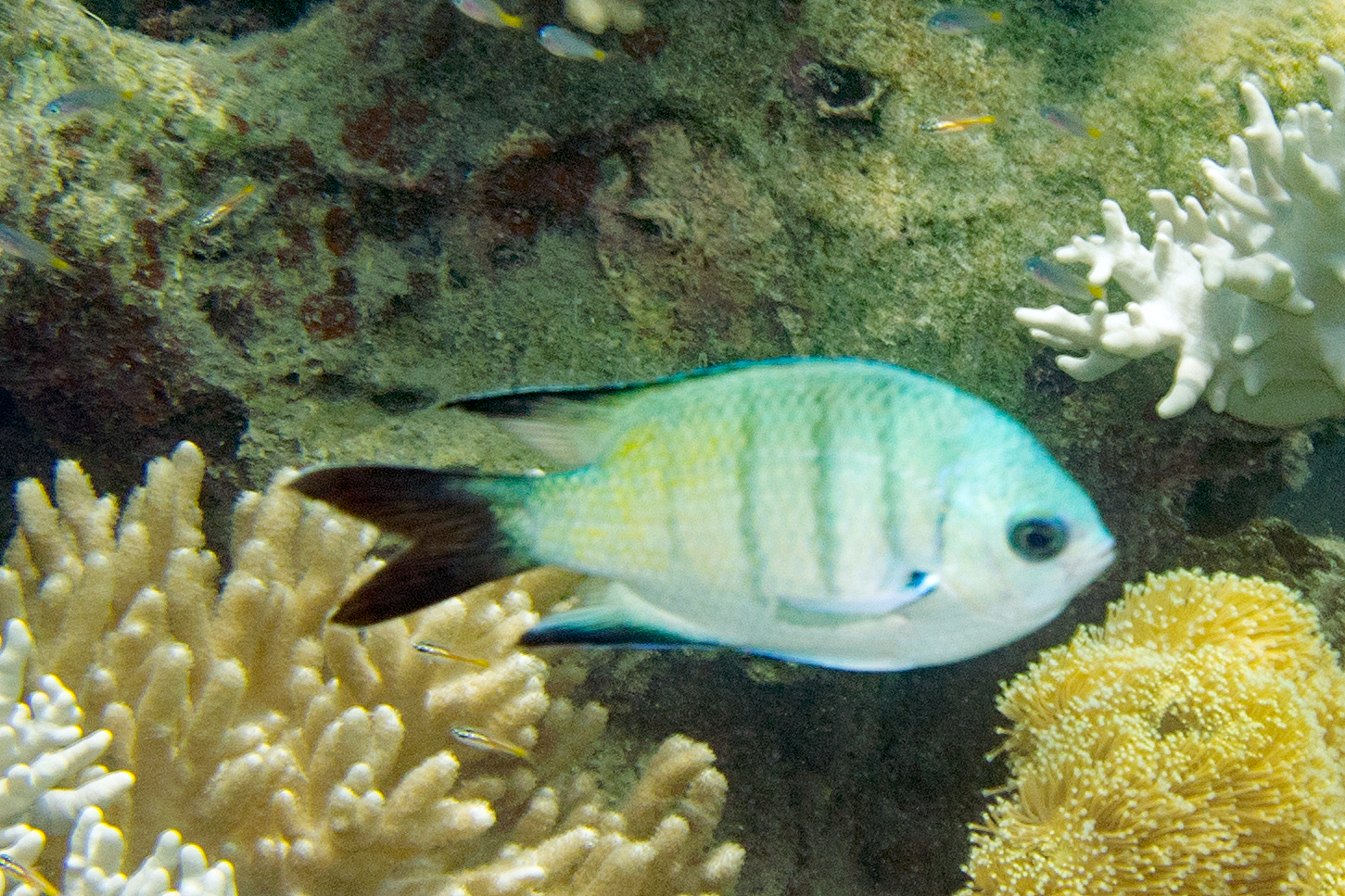

Conservation status
- Least Concern (IUCN 3.1)

Scientific classification
- Kingdom: Animalia
- Phylum: Chordata
- Class: Actinopterygii
- Order: Blenniiformes
- Family: Pomacentridae
- Genus: Abudefduf
- Species: A. whitleyi

Binomial name
- Abudefduf whitleyi Allen & Robertson, 1974

= Abudefduf whitleyi =

Species of fish

Abudefduf whitleyi, known as Whitley's sergeant, is a species of damselfish in the family Pomacentridae. It is native to the tropical southwestern Pacific Ocean, where it is known from Australia, New Caledonia, and the Coral Sea. The species is generally found in shallow reef environments at depths of 1 to 5 m (3 to 16 ft), where feeding aggregations of more than a hundred individuals are frequently seen swimming in the water column relatively high above the substrate. It is oviparous, with individuals forming distinct pairs during breeding and males guarding and aerating eggs. Abudefduf whitleyi reaches 14 cm (5.5 in) in standard length.
