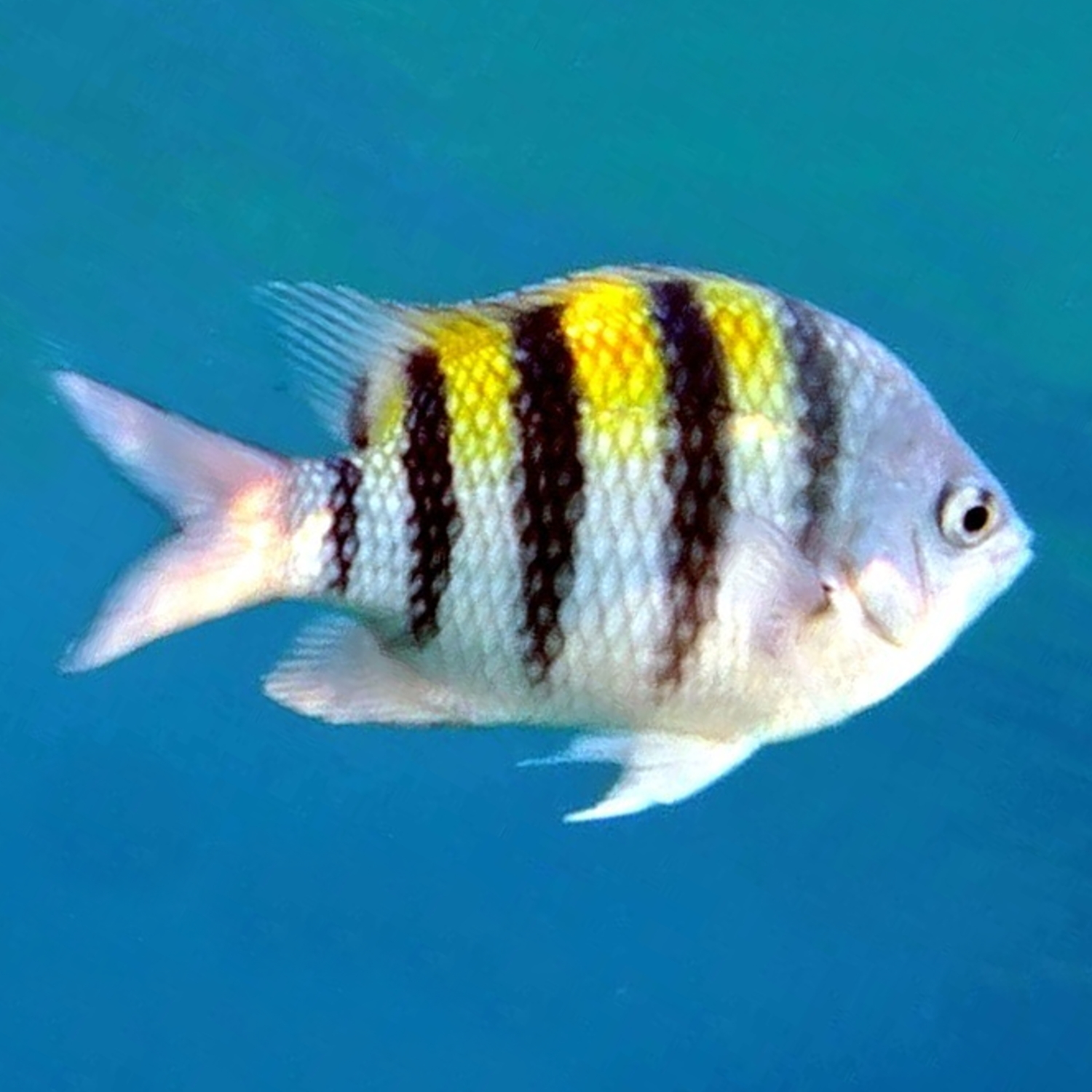
- A sergeant major swimming inshore at Phil Foster Park, Florida

Conservation status
- Least Concern (IUCN 3.1)

Scientific classification
- Kingdom: Animalia
- Phylum: Chordata
- Class: Actinopterygii
- Division: Teleostei
- Order: Blenniiformes
- Family: Pomacentridae
- Genus: Abudefduf
- Species: A. saxatilis

Binomial name
- Abudefduf saxatilis (Linnaeus, 1758)

Synonyms
- List: Chaetodon saxatilis Linnaeus, 1758; Glyphidodon saxatilis (Linnaeus, 1758); Chaetodon marginatus Bloch, 1787; Abudefduf marginatus (Bloch, 1787); Chaetodon mauritii Bloch, 1787; Glyphisodon moucharra Lacépède, 1802; Chaetodon sargoides Lacepède, 1802; Glyphisodon biniar Montrouzier, 1857; Apogon quinquevittatus Blyth, 1858; Abudefduf ascensionis Fowler, 1919

= Sergeant major (fish) =

Species of fish

The sergeant major or píntano (Abudefduf saxatilis) is a species of damselfish. It grows to a maximum length of about 22.9 cm (9.0 in).

== Distribution and habitat ==
Abudefduf saxatilis is found in the Atlantic Ocean. Populations in the western part of the Atlantic Ocean are found from the northeastern coast of the United States south to the Gulf of Mexico, the Bahamas, islands around the Caribbean Sea, and the eastern coast of Central and South America to Uruguay. In the eastern Atlantic, they are found from Portugal, the Azores, the Canary Islands, Cape Verde, and western Africa. Its distribution remains unclear in the Mediterranean Sea due to possible confusion with A. vaigiensis and A. troschelii. Juveniles are common in tidal pools, while adults are found over coral reefs. Sergeant majors are found down to 40 m (130 ft).

== Description ==
Adults can grow to a maximum of 22.9 cm (9.0 in), but more typically grow to 15 cm (5.9 in). The largest recorded specimen weighed had a weight of 200 g (7.1 oz). A. saxatilis has 13 dorsal spines, 12 to 13 dorsal soft rays, two anal spines, and 10 to 12 anal soft rays. This fish is white with a yellow top. It has five black or dark blue, vertical stripes. A faint sixth stripe might be present on the caudal peduncle. Adult males have a more bluish coloration and their stripes are less visible. A dark spot surrounds their pectoral fins.

== Ecology ==
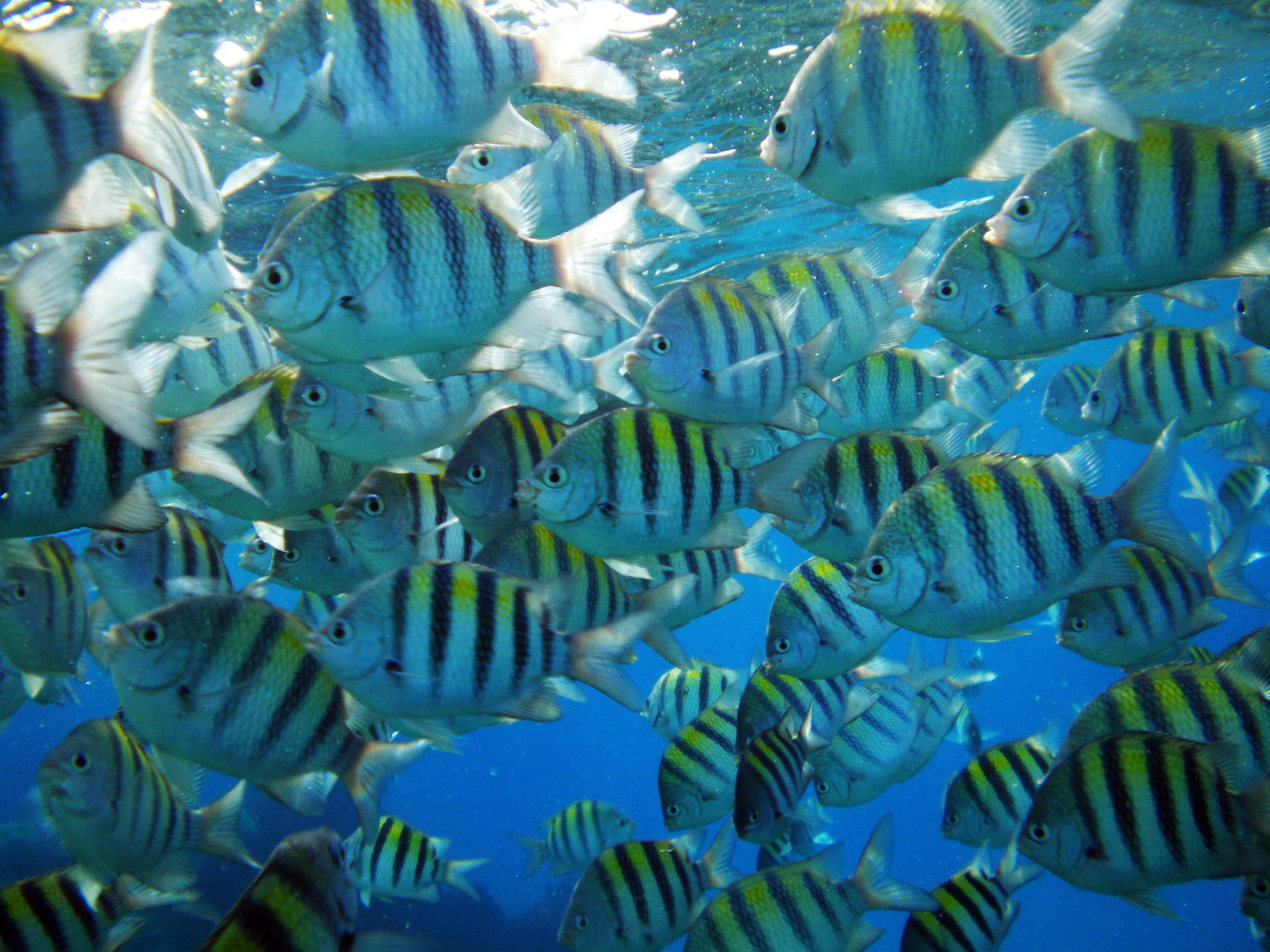
School of sergeant majors, Jamaica

=== Diet ===
This fish feeds upon the larvae of invertebrates, zooplankton (such as copepods and shrimp larvae), pelagic tunicates, smaller fish, crustaceans, and various species of algae (both benthic and pelagic). It is also known to feed on the waste and vomit of spinner dolphins.

== Behavior ==
Individuals of this species form shoals of about several hundred individuals. Sometimes, they get cleaned of parasites by fish species, such as gobies in the genus Gobiosoma, Bodianus rufus, Elacatinus figaro, and Thalassoma noronhanum. Sergeant majors also clean green sea turtles along with Acanthurus chirurgus and Acanthurus coeruleus.

=== Predators ===
Predators of this fish include Plectropomus leopardus, Thalassoma bifasciatum, Cephalopholis cruentata, Epinephelus striatus, Mycteroperca venenosa, and Rachycentron canadum.

== In the aquarium ==
They are found in the aquarium trade, but are regarded as difficult to breed.

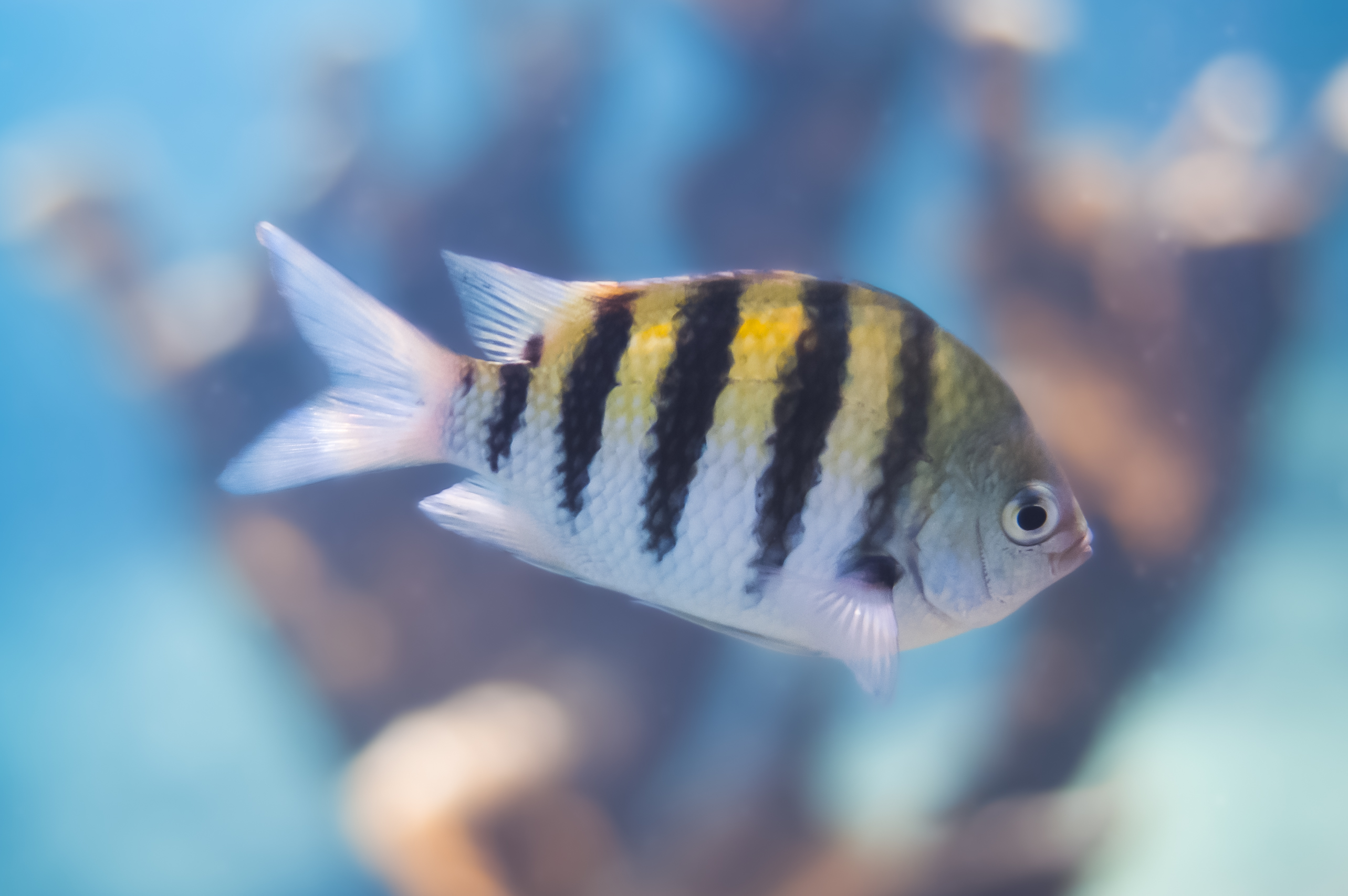
A sergeant major fish or píntano (Abudefduf saxatilis) is a species of damselfish in Curaçao.

== Reproduction ==
The sergeant major is an oviparous species in which the males create nests on rocks, reef outcrops, shipwrecks, and pilings, where the females lay their egg masses. The males actively chase the females in courtship before the female releases about 200,000 ref, ovoid eggs, which are attached to the substrate by a filament; the eggs turn greenish after a few days and are guarded by the male. As he guards the eggs, the male becomes bluish in colour, guarding them for about a week.

== Etymology ==
Sergeant majors earn their name from their brightly striped sides, known as bars, which are reminiscent of the insignia of a military sergeant major.
