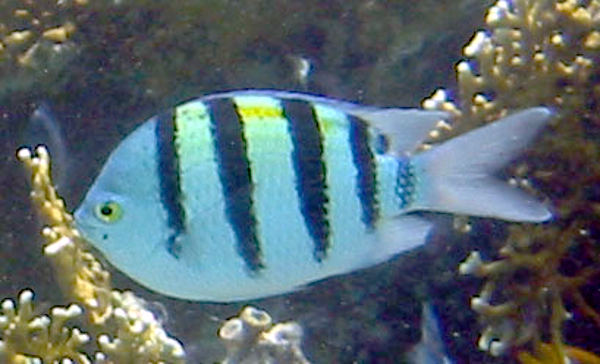

Conservation status
- Least Concern (IUCN 3.1)

- Vulnerable (IUCN 3.1)(Persian Gulf)

Scientific classification
- Kingdom: Animalia
- Phylum: Chordata
- Class: Actinopterygii
- Order: Blenniiformes
- Family: Pomacentridae
- Genus: Abudefduf
- Species: A. vaigiensis

Binomial name
- Abudefduf vaigiensis (Quoy & Gaimard, 1825)

Synonyms
- Glyphisodon vaigiensis Quoy & Gaimard, 1825; Chaetodon tyrwhitti Bennett, 1830; Glyphisodon rahti Cuvier, 1830; Glyphisodon quadrifasciatus Bleeker, 1847; Abudefduf quinquilineatus von Bonde, 1934

= Indo-Pacific sergeant =

Species of fish

The Indo-Pacific sergeant (Abudefduf vaigiensis) is a species of damselfish in the family Pomacentridae. It may also be known as the Sergeant major although this name is usually reserved for the closely related species Abudefduf saxatilis. The closely related Abudefduf caudobimaculatus was formerly considered to be synonymous with this species and, according to some authorities, is synonymous.

== Distribution ==
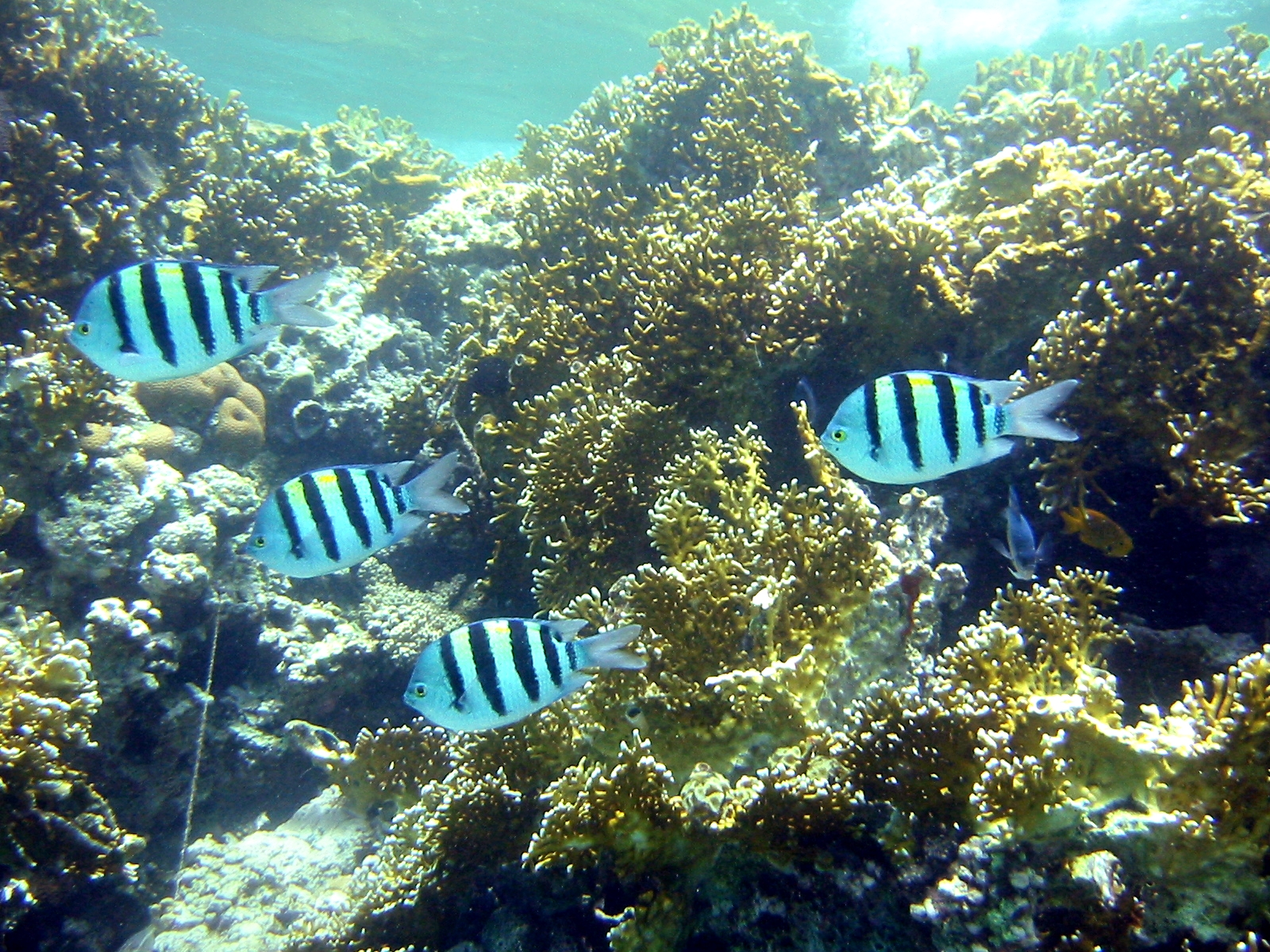
By a reef with fire coral in Taba, Egypt

The Indo-Pacific sergeant is found in the Indo-Pacific including the Red Sea. Indian Ocean populations are found in the Red Sea, the Gulf of Aden, Arabia, the Persian Gulf, the Arabian Sea, the Maldives, eastern Africa, Tanzania, Madagascar, Seychelles, Sri Lanka, the Andaman Sea, Indonesia, Malaysia, and Australia. Populations in the Pacific Ocean are found in the Gulf of Thailand, Malaysia, Indonesia, the Philippines, Taiwan, Japan, the Yellow Sea, the Great Barrier Reef around Australia, New Zealand, and Pacific islands all the way to Hawaii. Likely introduced via Suez Canal in the Mediterranean Sea, where its distribution remains unclear due to possible confusion with Abudefduf saxatilis and Abudefduf troschelii.

== Description ==
Abudefduf vaigiensis are white bluish with a yellow top. They have a black spot around their dorsal fin. It has yellow eyes. The dorsal fin on this fish has 13 dorsal spines and 11 to 14 dorsal soft rays. The anal fin on the Indo-Pacific sergeant has 2 anal spines and 11 to 13 anal soft rays. Its maximum recorded size is 20 centimetres (7.9 in). Juveniles mature at 12 centimetres (4.7 in). Males turn more blue during spawning. Many people confuse this fish for Abudefduf saxatilis, a closely related species found in the Atlantic Ocean.

== Ecology ==
=== Diet ===
They feed on zooplankton, benthic algae, and small invertebrates.

=== Habitat ===
Adults live in coral reefs, tide pools, and rocky reefs. Larva of this species live in the open sea. It is found in tropical and subtropical waters. Depth ranges of 1 to 15 metres (3.3 to 49.2 ft) are where people encounter this fish.

=== Behavior ===
These fish form large aggregations. In the aggregations, individuals either feed in the midwater or tend their nests.

== In the aquarium ==
This fish is found in the aquarium trade.

== Hazards to humans ==
There have been reports of ciguatera poisoning from this fish.

== Life Cycle ==
=== Early life ===
The larva hatch and drift out in to the pelagic zone. They drift in the waves and grow up until they go to a reef.

=== Breeding ===
Males turn more bluish during spawning. They build nests on rocks or coral ledges. Then, females lay their eggs in the nests and the male fertilizes them. Males guard and aerate the eggs until they hatch.
