= Kagoshima University Museum =

Museum in Japan

- 鹿児島大学総合研究博物館
- Interactive map of the Kagoshima University Museum area

General information
- Location: 1-21-24 Kōrimoto, Kagoshima, Kagoshima Prefecture, Japan
- Coordinates: 31°34′18″N 130°32′46″E
- Opened: 21 May 2004

Technical details
- Floor count: 2

Website
- Official website

The Kagoshima University Museum (鹿児島大学総合研究博物館, Kagoshima Daigaku Sōgō Kenkyū Hakubutsukan) is a facility affiliated with Kagoshima University in Kagoshima, Kagoshima Prefecture, Japan for the collection, preservation, research, display, and educational use of the various materials generated and acquired by the University. It was established in 2001 as the seventh museum attached to a national university.

== Architecture ==
The reinforced concrete permanent exhibition hall, which dates to 1928 and originally functioned as a book store for the library of the former Kagoshima Agricultural College, was restored in 2003 before reopening in its current guise the following year; it is a Registered Tangible Cultural Property.

== Collection ==
The display on the lower floor is of archaeological, historical, and cultural materials, while that on the upper floor is of geological specimens, fossils, and other natural history-related exhibits. The collection totals over 1,350,000 items.

== See also ==
- Reimeikan, Kagoshima Prefectural Center for Historical Material
- Kagoshima City Museum of Art
