= Hallucinogenic fish =

Fish which can produce hallucinogenic effects when eaten

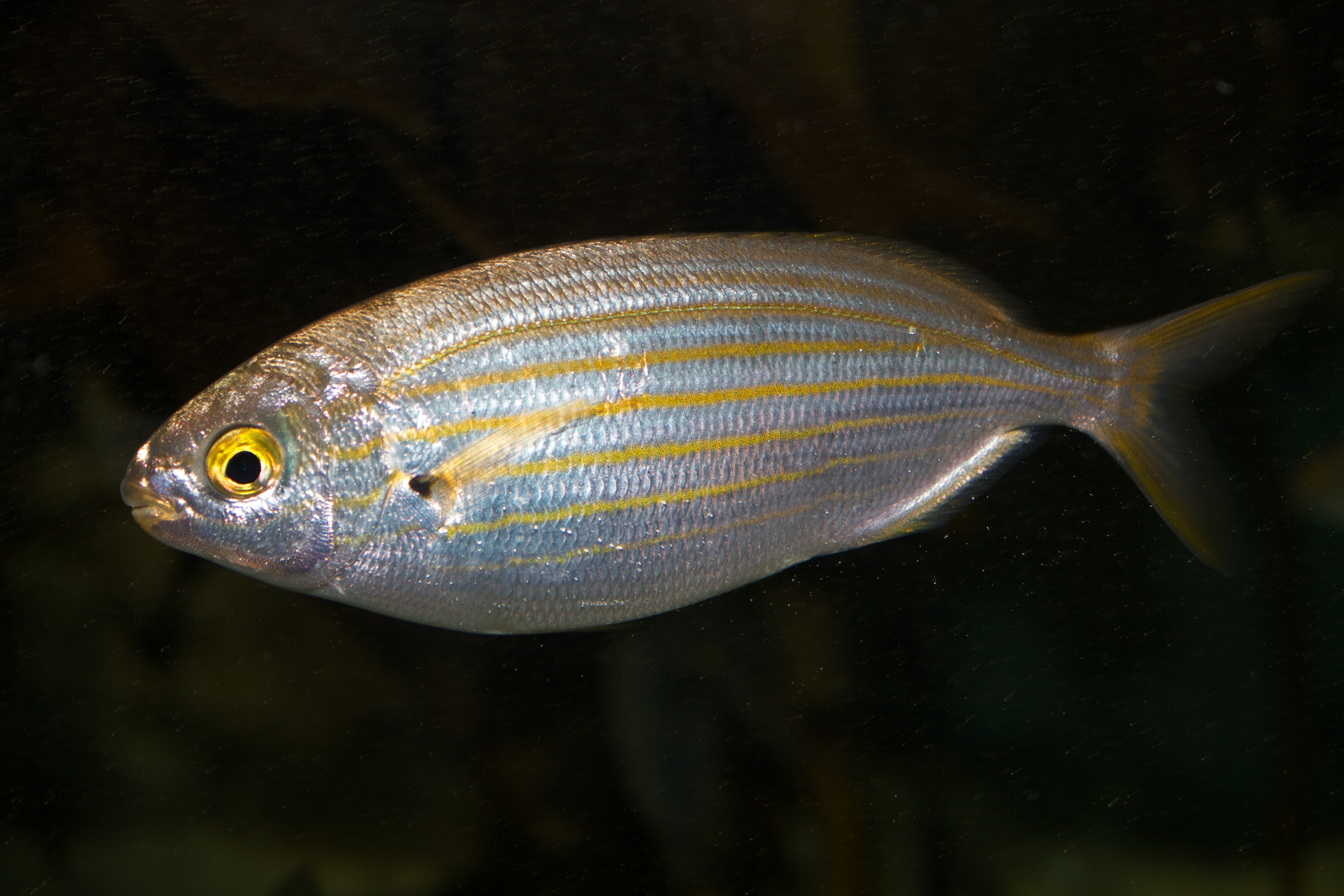
Ingesting the dreamfish Sarpa salpa can result in hallucinations that last for several days.

Several species of fish are claimed to produce hallucinogenic effects when consumed, a condition known as ichthyoallyeinotoxism. For example, Sarpa salpa, a species of sea bream referred to as the "dream-fish", is commonly claimed to be hallucinogenic. These widely distributed coastal fish are normally found in the Mediterranean and around the Iberian Peninsula, west to the Azores and along the west and south coasts of Africa. Occasionally they are found in British or more northerly waters. They may induce hallucinogenic effects similar to LSD (lysergic acid diethylamide) if eaten. However, based on the reports of exposure, the effects are more likely to resemble those of deliriants than of serotonergic psychedelics such as LSD. In 2006, two men who apparently ate the fish experienced hallucinations lasting for several days (an effect common with some naturally occurring deliriants). The likelihood of hallucinations depends on the season. Sarpa salpa is known as "the fish that makes dreams" in Arabic.

Other species claimed to be capable of producing hallucinations include several species of sea chub from the genus Kyphosus. It is unclear whether the toxins are produced by the fish themselves or by marine algae in their diet. Other hallucinogenic fish are Siganus spinus, called "the fish that inebriates" in Reunion Island, and Mulloidichthys flavolineatus (formerly Mulloidichthys samoensis), called "the chief of ghosts" in Hawaii.

== Cause of hallucinations ==
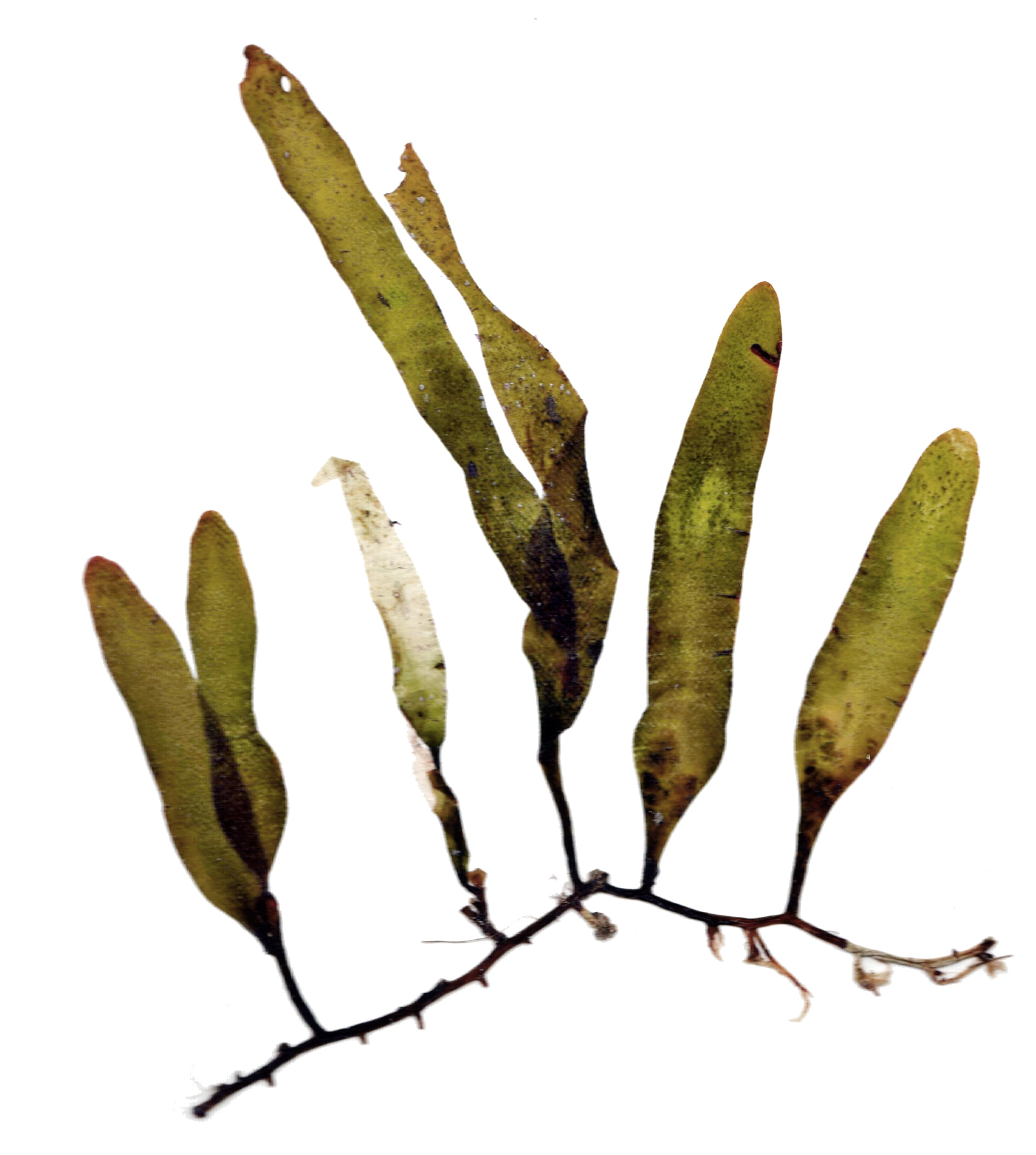
Some fish may become hallucinogenic after grazing on Caulerpa prolifera, a species of green alga that forms dense beds on shallow sandy areas.

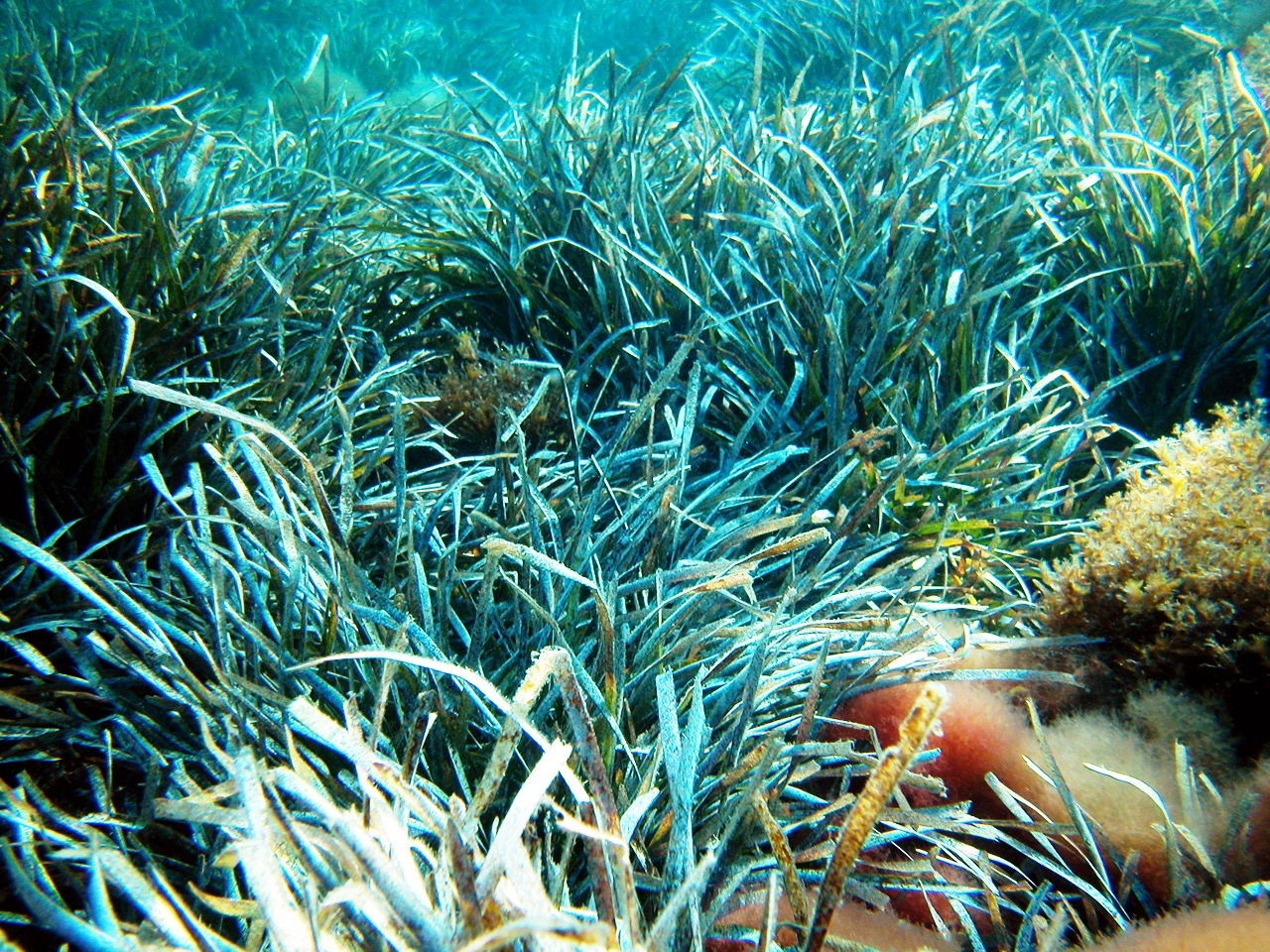
Also implicated is Posidonia oceanica, a seagrass that lives in meadows along the Mediterranean coast.

The active agent(s) that cause hallucinations in humans, and the origin of these agents, are not clear. Some authors think they could come from toxins associated with macroalgae that accumulate in the flesh of the fish. Toxins from the green algae Caulerpa prolifera in the Mediterranean Sea appear to be implicated, as is the seagrass Posidonia oceanica. When herbivores eat seagrass leaves they ingest algal epiphytes and toxic dinoflagellates that live on the seagrass leaves. The German anthropologist Christian Rätsch thinks that dreamfish might contain the hallucinogen DMT.

A few reporters have eaten the dream fish and described their strange effects. The most famous user is Joe Roberts, a photographer for the National Geographic magazine. He broiled the dream fish in 1960. After eating the delicacy, he experienced intense hallucinations with a science-fiction theme that included futuristic vehicles, images of space exploration, and monuments marking humanity's first trips into space.

== Hallucinogenic species ==
Fish species reported as hallucinogenic
Diet	Family	Image	Species	Common name	Max length	Reported locations	Notes	Other sources
Herbivores	Clown and damselfishes		Abudefduf septemfasciatus	Banded sergeant	23 cm	Gilbert Islands		
Herbivores	Rabbitfish		Siganus argenteus	Streamlined spinefoot	40 cm	Mauritius		
Herbivores	Rabbitfish		Siganus corallinus	Blue-spotted spinefoot	35 cm	Mauritius		
Herbivores	Rabbitfish		Siganus luridus	Dusky spinefoot	30 cm	Israel		
Herbivores	Rabbitfish		Siganus rivulatus	Marbled spinefoot	27 cm	Mauritius; Israel (suspected)		
Herbivores	Rabbitfish		Siganus spinus	Little spinefoot	28 cm	Réunion island		
Herbivores	Sea breams		Sarpa salpa	Salema	51 cm	Tunisia; France; Israel		
Herbivores	Sea chub		Kyphosus cinerascens	Blue sea chub	50 cm	Hawaii		
Herbivores	Sea chub		Kyphosus vaigiensis	Brassy chub	70 cm	Hawaii		
Herbivores	Sea chub		Kyphosus bigibbus	Brown chub	75 cm	Norfolk Island	Formerly Kyphosus fuscus	
Herbivores	Surgeon fish		Acanthurus triostegus	Convict surgeonfish	27 cm	Hawaii		
Omnivores	Goatfish		Mulloidichthys flavolineatus	Yellowstripe goatfish	43 cm	Hawaii	Formerly Mulloidichthys samoensis. Called "the chief of ghosts" in Hawaii	
Omnivores	Goatfish		Upeneus taeniopterus	Finstripe goatfish	33 cm	Hawaii	Formerly Upeneus arge	
Omnivores	Mullet		Mugil cephalus	Flathead grey mullet	100 cm	Hawaii		
Omnivores	Mullet		Neomyxus leuciscus	Acute-jawed mullet	46 cm	Hawaii	Formerly Neomyxus chaptalli	
Carnivores	Groupers		Epinephelus corallicola	Coral grouper	49 cm	Gilbert Islands		

== Ichthyoallyeinotoxism ==
Ichthyoallyeinotoxism, or hallucinogenic fish inebriation, is a clinical syndrome that refers to a hallucinogenic inebriation of a distressing nature that can arise from consuming hallucinogenic fish. It is characterised by "psychologic disturbances of hallucination and depression. Gastrointestinal disturbance may occur". "Ichthyoallyeinotoxism is a kind of ichthysarcotoxism (fish flesh poisoning) responsible of an unusual clinical feature: it is the unique case of central nervous system ichthyotoxicity. The most frequent signs are dizziness, loss of co-ordination and hallucinations."

Ichthyoallyeinotoxism may result from eating the flesh or the head of the fish where the poison is reputedly concentrated. This biotoxication is sporadic and unpredictable in its occurrence. The poison affects primarily the central nervous system. The symptoms may develop within a few minutes to 2 hours and persist for 24 hours or longer. Symptoms are dizziness, loss of equilibrium, lack of motor coordination, hallucinations and mental depression. A common complaint of the victim is that "someone is sitting on my chest", or there is a sensation of a tight constriction around the chest. The conviction that he is going to die, or some other frightening fantasy, is a characteristic part of the clinical picture. Other complaints consist of itching, burning of the throat, muscular weakness and abdominal distress. No fatalities have been reported, and in comparison with other forms of ichthyosarcotoxism, hallucinogenic fish poisoning is relatively mild... Ordinary cooking procedures do not destroy the poison.

== See also ==
- 5-Bromo-DMT
- Entheogen
- Hallucinogenic plant
- Venomous fish
- Ciguatera
