= Poisonous fish =

Fish containing indigestible toxins

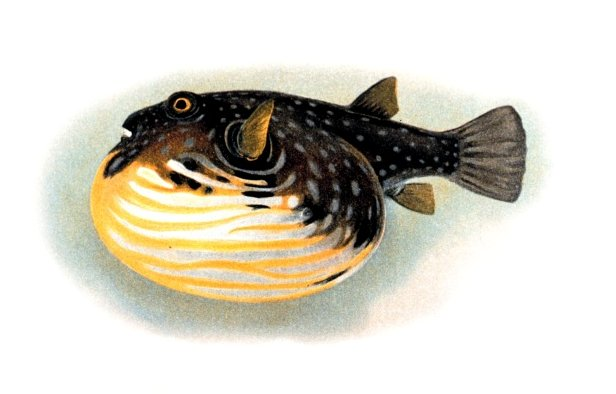
Puffer fish are the most poisonous fish in the world.

Poisonous fish are fish that are poisonous to eat. They contain toxins which are not destroyed by the digestive systems of animals that eat the fish. Venomous fish also contain toxins, but do not necessarily cause poisoning if they are eaten, since the digestive system often destroys their venom.

== Examples ==
- Species of puffer fish (the family Tetraodontidae) are the most poisonous in the world, and the second most poisonous vertebrate after the golden dart frog. The active substance, tetrodotoxin, found in the internal organs and sometimes also the skin, paralyzes the diaphragm muscles of human victims, who can die from suffocation. In Japan, skilled chefs use parts of a closely related species, the blowfish to create a delicacy called "fugu".
- The spotted trunkfish is a coral reef fish that secretes colourless pahutoxin from glands on its skin when touched. The toxin is only dangerous when ingested, and poses no immediate harm to divers. However, predators as large as nurse sharks can die as a result of eating a trunkfish.
- Many eel-like fish of the order Anguilliformes have toxic proteins in their blood which has to be destroyed with heat before eating. Moray eels also produce toxic mucus, and can store toxins in their flesh and organs. The giant moray is a reef fish at the top of the food chain. Like many other apex reef fish, it is likely to cause ciguatera poisoning if eaten. Outbreaks of ciguatera poisoning in the 11th to 15th centuries from large, carnivorous reef fish, caused by harmful algal blooms, could be a reason why Polynesians migrated to Easter Island, New Zealand, and possibly Hawaii.
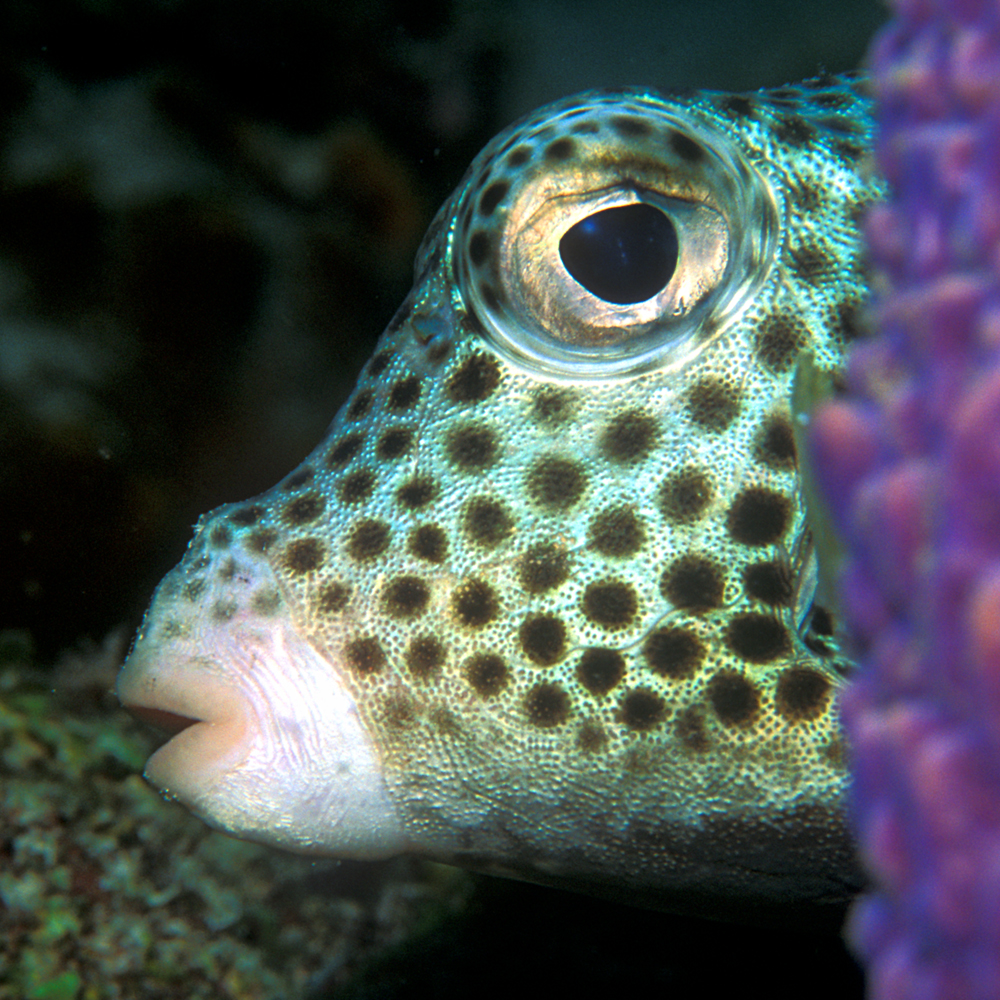
The spotted trunkfish is a coral reef fish which secretes a ciguatera toxin from glands on its skin as a form of self defense.

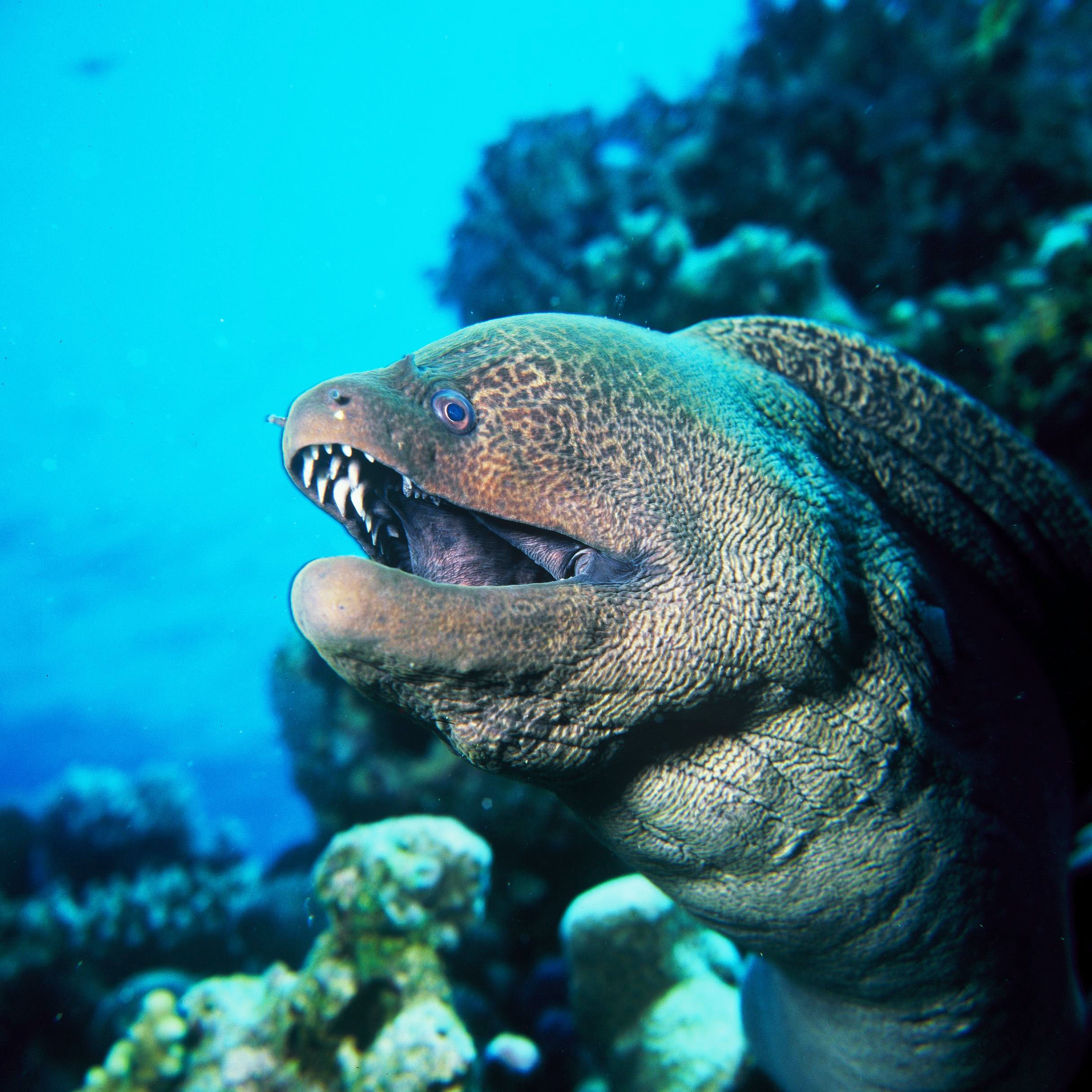
The giant moray, a coral reef fish at the top of the food chain is also likely to cause ciguatera poisoning if eaten.

== See also ==
- Aquatic toxicology
- Ciguatera
- Haff disease
- Hallucinogenic fish
- Ichthyoallyeinotoxism
- Salmon poisoning disease
- Scombroid food poisoning
- Venomous fish
