= Fish as food =

Fish eaten by humans

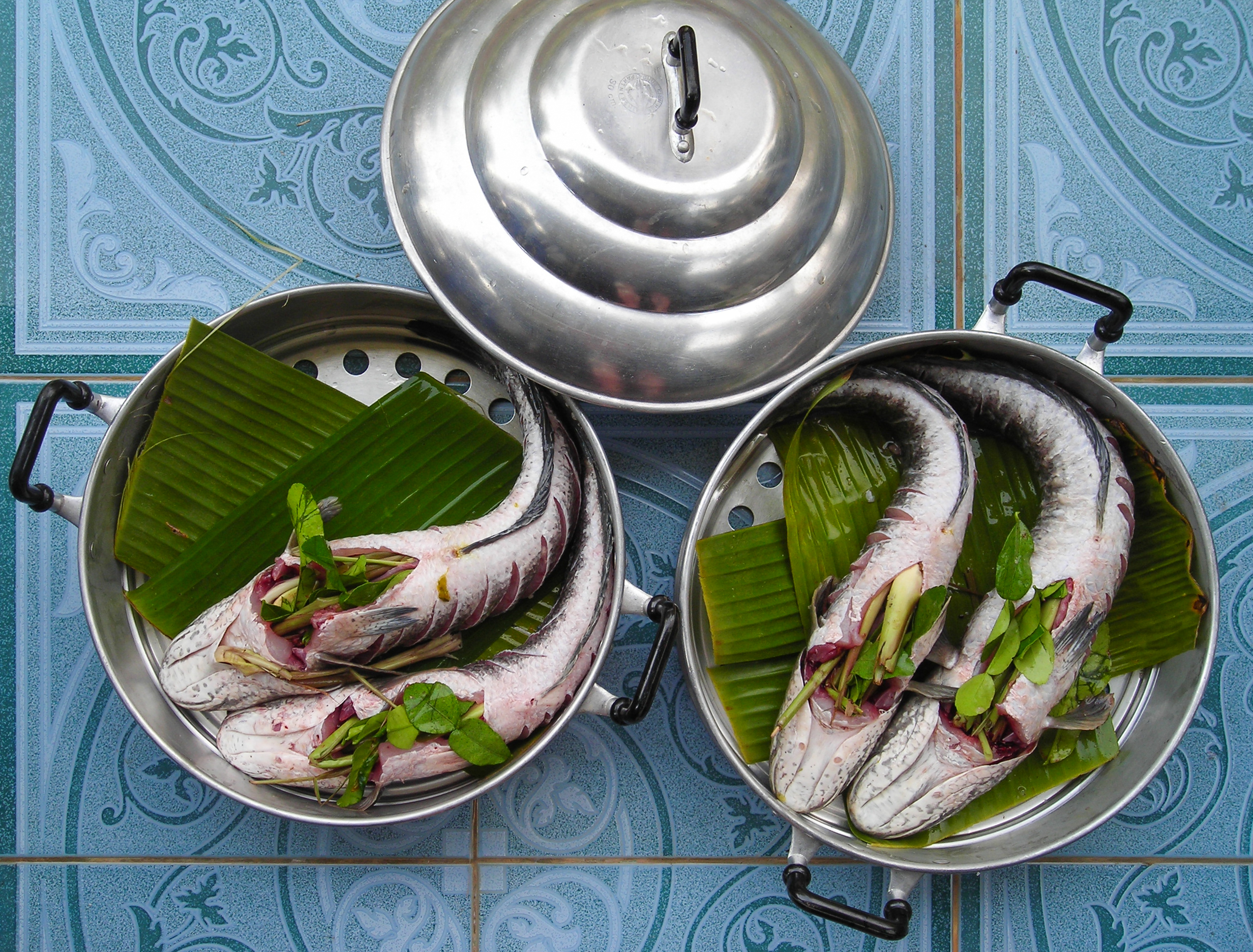
Channa striata stuffed with Thai herbs

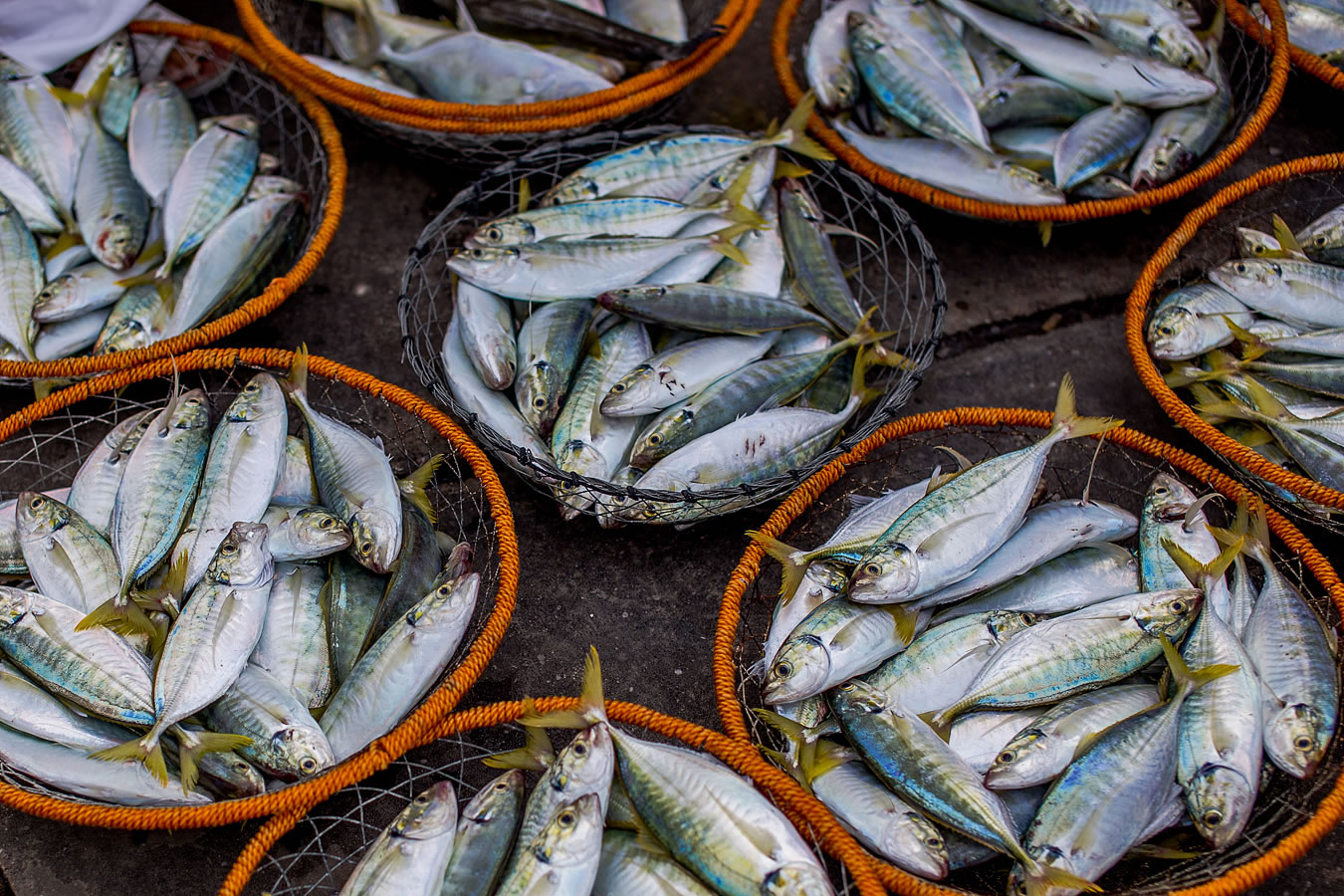
Fish for sale in baskets at the Dubai Fish Market

Many species of fish are caught by humans and consumed as food in virtually all regions around the world. Their meat has been an important dietary source of protein and other nutrients in the human diet.

The English language does not have a special culinary name for food prepared from fish like with other animals (as with pig vs. pork), or as in other languages (such as Spanish pez vs. pescado). In culinary and fishery contexts, fish may include so-called shellfish such as molluscs, crustaceans, and echinoderms; but, more expansively, seafood covers both fish and other marine life used as food.

Since 1961, the average annual increase in global apparent food fish consumption (3.2 percent) has outpaced population growth (1.6 percent) and exceeded the increase in consumption of meat from all terrestrial animals except poultry (4.9 percent), both combined (2.8 percent) and individually (bovine, ovine, porcine, et cetera). In per capita terms, food fish consumption has grown from 9.0 kg (19.8 lb) in 1961, to 20.2 kg (45 lb) in 2015, at an average rate of about 1.5 percent per year. The expansion in consumption has been driven not only by increased production, but also by a combination of many other factors, including reduced wastage, better utilization, improved distribution channels and growing consumer demand, linked with population growth, rising disposable incomes and urbanization.

Europe, Japan and the United States together accounted for 47 percent of the world's total food fish consumption in 1961, but only about 20 percent in 2015. Of the global total of 149 million tonnes in 2015, Asia consumed more than two-thirds (106 million tonnes at 24.0 kg per capita), while Oceania and Africa consumed the lowest share. The shift is the result of structural changes in the sector, and the growing role of Asian countries in fish production in particular, as well as a significant gap between the economic growth rates of the world's more mature fish markets and those of many increasingly important emerging markets around the world, particularly in Asia.

== Species ==
Over 32,000 species of fish have been described, making them the most diverse group of vertebrates. In addition, there are many species of shellfish. However, only about 20% of extant fish species are used by humans as food.

Common species of fish and shellfish used for food
	Mild flavour	Moderate flavour	Full flavour
Delicate texture	Basa, flounder, hake, scup, smelt, rainbow trout, hardshell clam, blue crab, peekytoe crab, spanner crab, cuttlefish, eastern oyster, Pacific oyster	Anchovy, herring, lingcod, moi, orange roughy, Atlantic Ocean perch, Lake Victoria perch, yellow perch, European oyster, sea urchin	Atlantic mackerel, sardines
Medium texture	Black sea bass, European sea bass, hybrid striped bass, bream, cod, drum, haddock, porgy, hoki, Alaska pollock, rockfish, pink salmon, snapper, tilapia, turbot, walleye, lake whitefish, wolffish, hardshell clam, surf clam, cockle, Jonah crab, snow crab, crayfish, bay scallop, Chinese white shrimp	Sablefish, Atlantic salmon, coho salmon, skate, dungeness crab, king crab, blue mussel, greenshell mussel, pink shrimp	Escolar, chinook salmon, chum salmon, American shad
Firm texture	Arctic char, carp, catfish, dory, grouper, halibut, monkfish, pompano, Dover sole, sturgeon, tilefish, wahoo, yellowtail, abalone, conch, stone crab, American lobster, spiny lobster, octopus, black tiger shrimp, sheepshead, freshwater shrimp, gulf shrimp, Pacific white shrimp, grey triggerfish, squid	Barramundi, cusk, dogfish, kingklip, mahimahi, opah, mako shark, swordfish, albacore tuna, yellowfin tuna, geoduck clam, squat lobster, sea scallop, rock shrimp	Barracuda, Chilean sea bass, cobia, croaker, eel, blue marlin, mullet, sockeye salmon, bluefin tuna

== Preparation ==
Fish can be prepared in a variety of ways. It can be served uncooked (raw food, e.g., sashimi); cured by marinating (e.g., ceviche), pickling (e.g., pickled herring) or smoking (e.g., smoked salmon); or cooked by baking, frying (e.g., fish and chips), grilling, poaching (e.g., court-bouillon) or steaming. Many of the preservation techniques used in different cultures have since become unnecessary but are still performed for their resulting taste and texture when consumed.

Cooked fish

Compared to meat, fish has a relatively delicate texture derived from short fibers separated by large sheets and thin connective tissue (about 3% of its weight, as opposed to 15% in land animals).

The British historian William Radcliffe wrote in Fishing from the Earliest Times:

"The Emperor Domitian (Juvenal, IV.) ordered a special sitting of the Senate to deliberate and advise on a matter of such grave State importance as the best method of cooking a turbot."

== Nutritional value ==
Comparison of nutrients in 100 g of whitefish or oily fish
Nutrient	Whitefish Alaska pollock	Oily fish Atlantic herring	Halibut fillet (a whitefish) on top of a salmon fillet (an oily fish)
Energy (kcal)	111	203	Halibut fillet (a whitefish) on top of a salmon fillet (an oily fish)
Protein (g)	23	23	Halibut fillet (a whitefish) on top of a salmon fillet (an oily fish)
Fat (g)	1	12	Halibut fillet (a whitefish) on top of a salmon fillet (an oily fish)
Cholesterol (mg)	86	77	Halibut fillet (a whitefish) on top of a salmon fillet (an oily fish)
Vitamin B-12 (μg)	4	13	Halibut fillet (a whitefish) on top of a salmon fillet (an oily fish)
Phosphorus (mg)	267	303	Halibut fillet (a whitefish) on top of a salmon fillet (an oily fish)
Selenium (μg)	44	47	Halibut fillet (a whitefish) on top of a salmon fillet (an oily fish)
Omega-3 (mg)	509	2014	Halibut fillet (a whitefish) on top of a salmon fillet (an oily fish)

Globally, fish and fish products provide an average of only about 34 calories per capita per day. However, more than as an energy source, the dietary contribution of fish is significant in terms of high-quality, easily digested animal proteins and especially in fighting micronutrient deficiencies. A portion of 150g of fish provides about 50 to 60 percent of an adult's daily protein requirement. Fish proteins are essential in the diet of some densely populated countries where the total protein intake is low, and are particularly important in diets in small island developing States (SIDS).

Intermediate Technology Publications wrote in 1992 that "Fish provides a good source of high quality protein and contains many vitamins and minerals. It may be classed as either whitefish, oily fish, or shellfish. Whitefish, such as haddock and seer, contain very little fat (usually less than 1%) whereas oily fish, such as sardines, contain between 10–25%. The latter, as a result of its high fat content, contain a range of fat-soluble vitamins (A, D, E and K) and essential fatty acids, all of which are vital for the healthy functioning of the body."

== Health benefits ==
Eating oily fish containing long-chain omega-3 fatty acids may reduce systemic inflammation and lower the risk of cardiovascular disease. Eating about 140 grams (4.9 oz) of oily fish rich in omega-3 fatty acids once per week is a recommended consumption amount. Increasing intake of omega-3 fatty acids may slightly reduce the risk of a fatal heart attack, but likely has little effect on the overall number of deaths from cardiovascular disease.

== Health hazards ==
Fish bone is the most common food-related foreign body to cause airway obstruction. Choking on fish was responsible for about 4,500 reported accidents in the United Kingdom in 1998.

=== Allergens ===
A seafood allergy is a food allergy to allergens which can be present in fish. This can result in an overreaction of the immune system and lead to severe physical symptoms from urticaria to angioedema and distributive shock. Allergic reactions can result from ingesting seafood, or by breathing in vapours from preparing or cooking seafood. The most severe allergic reaction is anaphylaxis, a medical emergency requiring immediate attention and is treated urgently with epinephrine.

=== Biotoxins ===
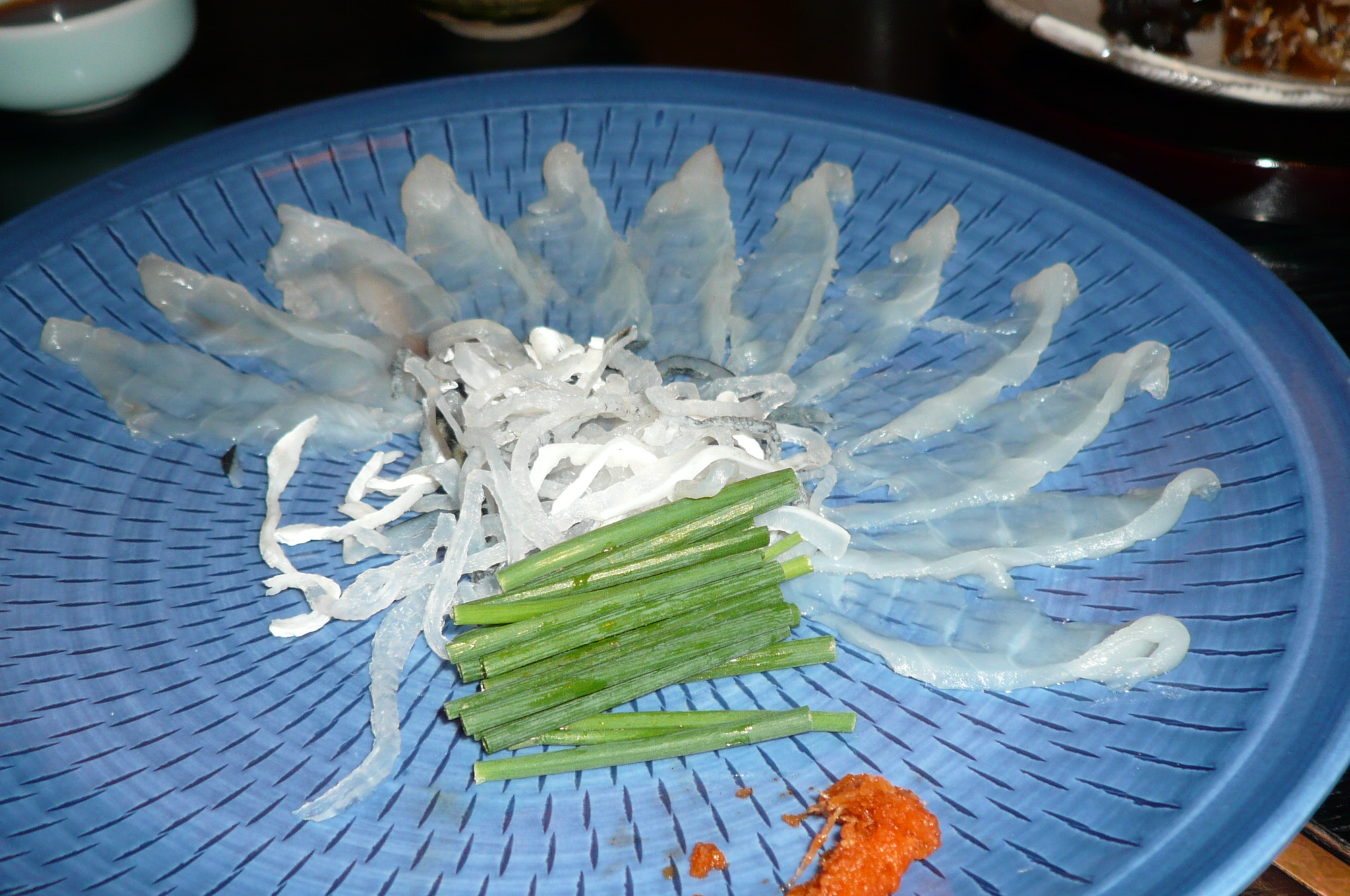
A specially prepared dish of the poisonous blowfish fugu, Japan

Some species of fish, notably the fugu pufferfish used for sushi, can result in serious food poisoning if not prepared properly. These fish always contain toxins as a natural defense against predators; it is not present due to environmental circumstances. Particularly, fugu has a lethal dose of tetrodotoxin in its internal organs and must be prepared by a licensed fugu chef who has passed the national examination in Japan. Ciguatera poisoning can occur from eating larger fish from warm tropical waters, such as sea bass, grouper, barracuda and red snapper. Scombroid poisoning can result from eating large oily fish which have sat around for too long before being refrigerated or frozen. This includes scombroids such as tuna and mackerel, but can also include non-scombroids such as mahi-mahi and amberjack. The poison is often odourless and tasteless.

Many fish eat algae and other organisms that contain biotoxins, which are defensive substances against predators. Biotoxins accumulated in fish/shellfish include brevetoxins, okadaic acid, saxitoxins, ciguatoxin and domoic acid. Except for ciguatoxine, high levels of these toxins are only found in shellfish. Both domoic acid and ciguatoxine can be deadly to humans; the others will only cause diarrhea, dizziness and a (temporary) feeling of claustrophobia.

Shellfish are filter feeders and, therefore, accumulate toxins produced by microscopic algae, such as dinoflagellates and diatoms, and cyanobacteria. There are four syndromes called shellfish poisoning which can result in humans, sea mammals and seabirds from the ingestion of toxic shellfish. These are primarily associated with bivalve molluscs, such as mussels, clams, oysters and scallops. Fish like anchovies can also concentrate toxins such as domoic acid. If suspected, medical attention should be sought.

Fish and Shellfish poisoning
	Poisoning type	Symptoms	Duration	Toxin	Antidote	Sources
Fish	Ciguatera	Nausea, vomiting and diarrhea, usually followed by headaches, muscle aches, paresthesia, numbness, ataxia, vertigo and hallucinations.	Weeks to years	Ciguatoxin and similar: maitotoxin, scaritoxin and palytoxin	None known	
Fish	Scombroid food poisoning	Skin flushing, throbbing headache, oral burning, abdominal cramps, nausea, diarrhea, palpitations, sense of unease, and, rarely, collapse or loss of vision. Symptoms occur usually within 10–30 minutes of ingesting spoiled fish.	Usually four to six hours	Histamine, possibly others	Oral anti-histamines	
Fish	Haff disease	Rhabdomyolysis, that is, a swelling and breakdown of skeletal muscle (with a risk of acute kidney failure) within 24 hours after consuming fish		A toxic cause is suspected but has not been proven	None known	
Fish	Ichthyo- allyeinotoxism	Vivid auditory and visual hallucinations similar in some aspects to LSD.	Can last for several days			
Shellfish	Amnesic	Permanent short-term memory loss and brain damage	Fatal in severe cases	Domoic acid, which acts as a neurotoxin	None known	
Shellfish	Diarrheal	Diarrhea and possibly nausea, vomiting and cramps.	Symptoms usually set in within half an hour and last about a day	Okadaic acid, which inhibits intestinal cellular de-phosphorylation.		
Shellfish	Neurotoxic	Vomiting and nausea and a variety of neurological symptoms such as slurred speech. Not fatal though it may require hospitalization.		Brevetoxins or brevetoxin analogs		
Shellfish	Paralytic	Includes nausea, vomiting, diarrhea, abdominal pain, and tingling or burning sensations. Other symptoms also possible.	Occasionally fatal	Principal toxin saxitoxin	4-Aminopyridine has been used in non-human animals.	

The toxins responsible for most shellfish and fish poisonings, including ciguatera and scombroid poisoning, are heat-resistant to the point where conventional cooking methods do not eliminate them.

=== Mercury and other toxic metals ===
Fish products, especially those from apex and higher-order consumers up the food chain, have been shown to contain varying amounts of heavy or toxic metals due to biomagnification. Toxicity is a function of solubility, and insoluble compounds often exhibit negligible toxicity. Organometallic forms such as dimethyl mercury and tetraethyl lead can be extremely toxic.

Mercury/omega-3 levels
Mercury level	Low < 0.04 ppm	Medium 0.04–0.40 ppm	High > 0.40 ppm
Omega-3			
High > 1.0%	salmon sardine	Atlantic mackerel flatfish halibut herring	Spanish mackerel swordfish tilefish
Medium 0.4–1.0%	pollock	hoki tuna	king mackerel shark
Low < 0.4%	catfish shrimp	cod snapper tuna canned light	grouper orange roughy

mercury/omega-3 levels in commercial fish and shellfish
species	mercury (mean ppm)	omega-3 (mean percent)	habitat	notes	trophic level	max age (years)
Tilefish	1.450	1.06	pelagic		3.6	35
Swordfish	0.995	1.14	pelagic		4.5	15
Shark	0.979	0.98	pelagic			
King mackerel	0.730	0.42	pelagic		4.5	14
Orange roughy	0.571	0.033	demersal		4.3	149
Marlin	0.485 *		pelagic		4.5	
Mackerel (Spanish)	0.454	1.65	pelagic		4.5	5
Grouper	0.448	0.27	demersal		4.2	
Tuna	0.391	0.77	pelagic	All species, fresh/frozen		
Patagonian toothfish	0.354		demersal		4.0	50+
Halibut	0.241	1.01	demersal		4.3	
Snapper	0.166	0.26	demersal			
Bass	0.152		demersal		3.9	
Perch	0.150		freshwater		4.0	
Tuna	0.128	0.24	pelagic	All species, canned, light		
Perch (ocean)	0.121 *		demersal			
Cod	0.111	0.23	demersal		3.9	22
Carp	0.110		freshwater			
Lobster (American)	0.107		demersal			
Lobster (spiny)	0.093		demersal			
Whitefish	0.089		demersal			
Herring	0.084	1.94	pelagic		3.2	21
Trout	0.071		freshwater			
Crab	0.065		demersal	Blue, king and snow crab		
Hoki (blue grenadier)	0.058	0.48	demersal		3.5	
Flatfish	0.056 *	0.56	demersal	Flounder, plaice and sole		
Haddock	0.055		demersal	Atlantic		
Atlantic mackerel	0.050	1.64	pelagic			
Mullet	0.050		pelagic			
Pollock	0.031	0.53	demersal			
Catfish	0.025	0.31	demersal		3.9	24
Squid	0.023		pelagic			
Salmon	0.022 *	1.76	pelagic	Fresh/frozen		
Anchovies	0.017		pelagic		3.1	
Sardine	0.013	1.94	pelagic		2.7	
Tilapia *	0.013		freshwater			
Oyster	0.012		demersal			
Clam *	0.009		demersal			
Salmon	0.008 *		pelagic	Canned		
Scallop	0.003		demersal			
Shrimp	0.001 *	0.12	demersal			6.5
Greenshell mussel		0.35	demersal			
Sydney rock oyster		1.11	demersal			
* indicates methylmercury only was analyzed (all other results are for total mercury)

According to the US Food and Drug Administration (FDA), the risk from mercury by eating fish and shellfish is not a health concern for most people. However, certain seafood contains sufficient mercury to harm an unborn baby or young child's developing nervous system. The FDA makes three recommendations for child-bearing women and young children:

1. Do not eat shark, swordfish, king mackerel, or tilefish because they contain high levels of mercury.
2. Eat up to 12 ounces (2 average meals) a week of a variety of fish and shellfish that are lower in mercury. Four of the most commonly eaten fish that are low in mercury are canned light tuna, salmon, pollock, and catfish. Another commonly eaten fish, albacore ("white tuna") has more mercury than canned light tuna. So, when choosing your two meals of fish and shellfish, you may eat up to 6 ounces (one average meal) of albacore tuna per week.
3. Check local advisories about the safety of fish caught by family and friends in your local lakes, rivers, and coastal areas. If no advice is available, eat up to 6 ounces (one average meal) per week of fish you catch from local waters, but do not consume any other fish during that week.

These recommendations are also advised when feeding fish and shellfish to young children, but in smaller portions.

=== Mislabelling ===
When the ocean conservation organization Oceana examined over 1,200 seafood samples of seafood sold in the U.S. between 2010 and 2012, they found one-third were mislabelled. The highest rate of mislabelling occurred with snapper at 87 percent, followed by tuna at 57 percent.

=== Persistent organic pollutants ===
If fish and shellfish inhabit polluted waters, they can accumulate other toxic chemicals, particularly fat-soluble pollutants containing chlorine or bromine, dioxins or PCBs.

=== Parasites ===
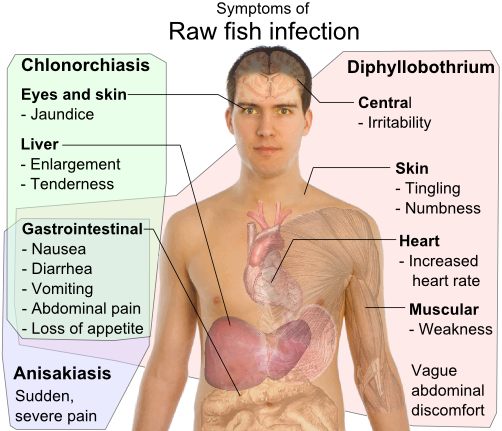
Differential symptoms of parasite infections by raw fish. All have gastrointestinal, but otherwise distinct, symptoms.

Parasites in fish are a common natural occurrence. Though not a health concern in thoroughly cooked fish, parasites are a concern when consumers eat raw or lightly preserved fish such as sashimi, sushi, ceviche and gravlax. The popularity of such raw fish dishes makes it important for consumers to be aware of this risk. Raw fish should be frozen to an internal temperature of −20 °C (−4 °F) for at least 7 days to kill parasites; home freezers may not be cold enough.

Historically, fish that live all or part of their lives in fresh water were considered unsuitable for sashimi due to the possibility of parasites (see Sashimi article). Parasitic infections from freshwater fish are a serious problem in some parts of the world, particularly Southeast Asia. Fish that spend part of their life cycle in brackish or fresh water, like salmon (an anadromous coastalfish closely related to trout), are a particular problem. A study in Seattle, Washington showed that 100% of wild salmon had roundworm larvae capable of infecting people. In the same study farm-raised salmon did not have any roundworm larvae.

Parasite infection from raw fish is rare in the developed world (fewer than 40 cases per year in the United States), and involves mainly three kinds of parasites: Clonorchis sinensis (a trematode/fluke), Anisakis (a nematode/roundworm) and Diphyllobothrium (a cestode/tapeworm). Infection risk of Anisakis is particularly high in fish which may have lived in a river or estuary, such as salmon (sa ke in Japanese cuisine) or mackerel (sa ba in Japanese cuisine). Such parasite infections can generally be avoided by boiling, grilling, preserving in salt or vinegar, or deep-freezing. In Japan, it is common to eat raw salmon and ikura (roe), but these foods are frozen overnight prior to eating to prevent infections from parasites, particularly Anisakis.

== Pescetarianism ==
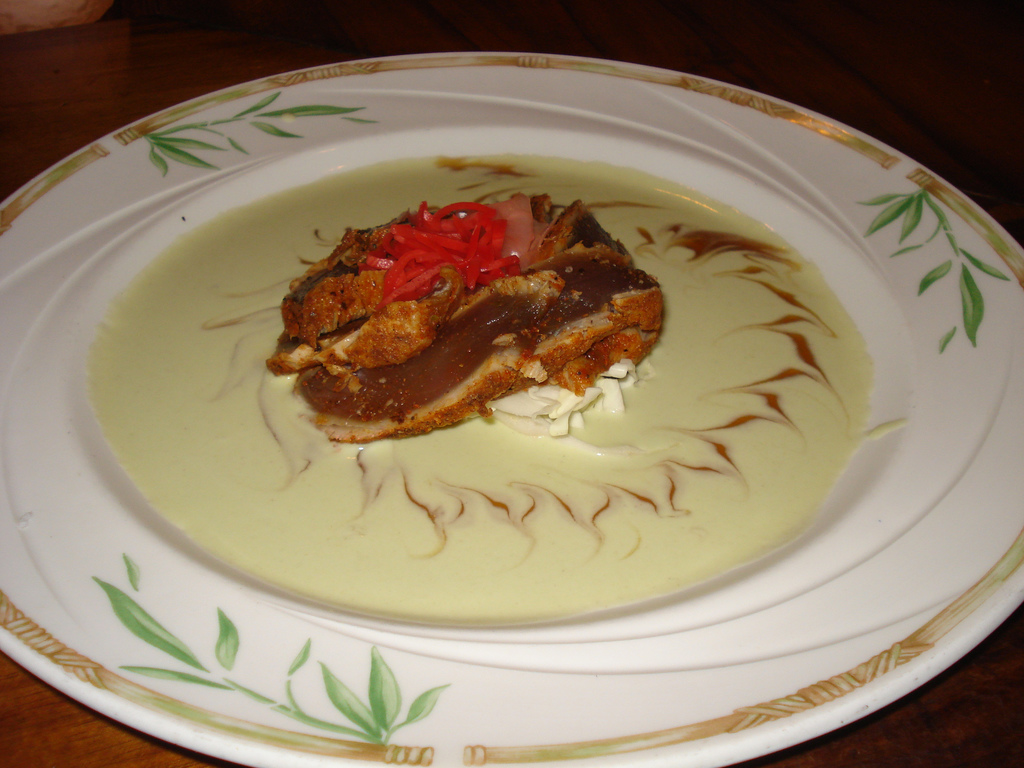
Hawaiian food: Seared ahi and wasabi beurre blanc sauce

The neologism "pescetarian" covers those who eat fish and other seafood, but not mammals and birds.

A 1999 metastudy combined data from five studies from western countries. The metastudy reported mortality ratios, where lower numbers indicated fewer deaths, for pescetarians to be 0.82, vegetarians to be 0.84, and occasional meat eaters to be 0.84. Regular meat eaters and vegans shared the highest mortality ratio of 1.00. However, the "lower mortality was due largely to the relatively low prevalence of smoking in these [vegetarian] cohorts".

Since fish is animal flesh, the Vegetarian Society has stated that vegetarian diets cannot contain fish.

== In religion ==
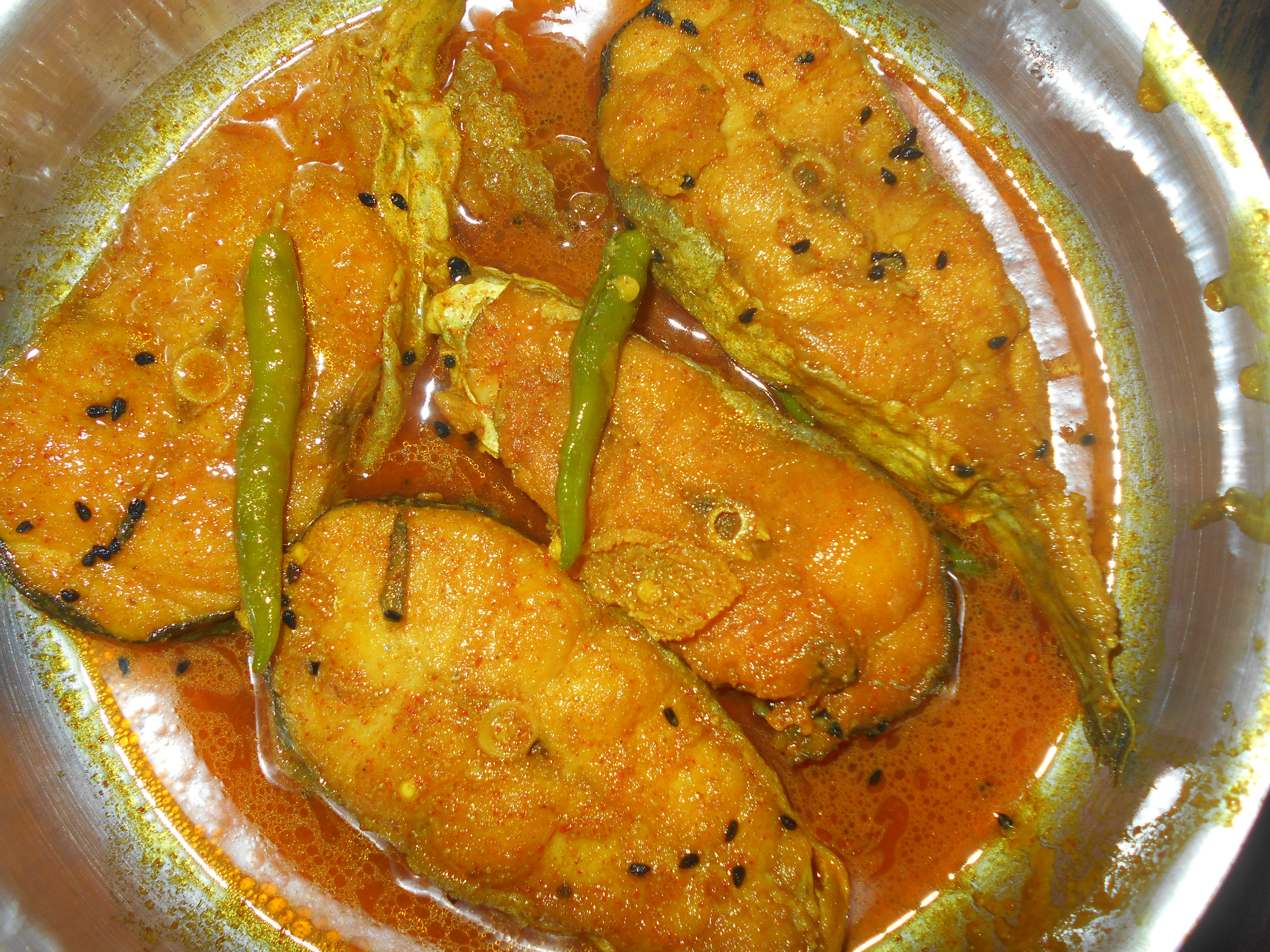
Machher jhol is a spicy fish stew in Bengali and Odia cuisines in the eastern Indian subcontinent.

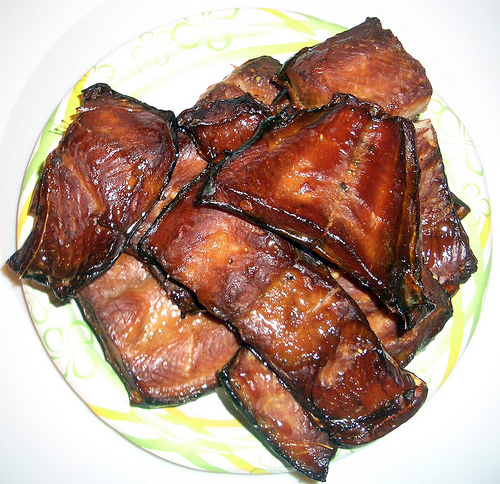
A plate of smoked salmon

Religious rites and rituals regarding food also tend to classify the birds of the air and the fish of the sea separately from land-bound mammals. Sea-bound mammals are often treated as fish under religious laws – as in Jewish dietary law, which forbids the eating of cetacean meat, such as whale, dolphin or porpoise, because they are not "fish with fins and scales"; nor, as mammals, do they chew their cud and have cloven hooves, as required by Leviticus 11:9–12. Jewish (kosher) practice treats fish differently from other animal foods. The distinction between fish and "meat" is codified by the Jewish dietary law of kashrut, regarding the mixing of milk and meat, which does not forbid the mixing of milk and fish. Modern Jewish legal practice (halakha) on kashrut classifies the flesh of both mammals and birds as "meat"; fish are considered to be parve, neither meat nor a dairy food. (The preceding portion refers only to the halakha of Ashkenazi Jews; Sephardic Jews do not mix fish with dairy.) Fish has traditionally been a significant Shabbat dish, as noted by the 1st century Roman satirist Persius and reflected in Talmudic accounts that describe the efforts of the poor to obtain fish for Shabbat and festivals.

Ichthys has become a symbol of Christianity since ancient times. In the New Testament Luke 24 – Jesus's eating of a fish ^{[Luke 24]} and Jesus telling his disciples where to catch fish, before cooking it for them to eat. Seasonal religious prohibitions against eating meat do not usually include fish. For example, non-fish meat was forbidden during Lent and on all Fridays of the year in pre-Vatican II Roman Catholicism, but fish was permitted (as were eggs). (See Fasting in Catholicism.) In Eastern Orthodoxy, fish is permitted on some fast days when other meat is forbidden, but stricter fast days also prohibit fish with spines, while permitting invertebrate seafood such as shrimp and oysters, considering them "fish without blood".

Some Buddhists and Hindus (Brahmins of West Bengal, Odisha and Saraswat Brahmins of the Konkan) abjure meat that is not fish. Muslim (halal) practice also treats fish differently from other animal foods, as it can be eaten without requiring the ritualistic slaughter that is prescribed for other halal animals.

== Taboos on eating fish ==
Among the Somali people, most clans have a taboo against the consumption of fish, and do not intermarry with the few occupational clans that do eat it.

There are taboos on eating fish among many upland pastoralists and agriculturalists (and even some coastal peoples) inhabiting parts of southeastern Egypt, Ethiopia, Eritrea, Somalia, Kenya, and northern Tanzania. This is sometimes referred to as the "Cushitic fish-taboo", as Cushitic speakers are believed to have been responsible for the introduction of fish avoidance to East Africa, though not all Cushitic groups avoid fish. The zone of the fish taboo roughly coincides with the area where Cushitic languages are spoken, and as a general rule, speakers of Nilo-Saharan and Semitic languages do not have this taboo, and indeed many are watermen. The few Bantu and Nilotic groups in East Africa that do practice fish avoidance also reside in areas where Cushites appear to have lived in earlier times. Within East Africa, the fish taboo is found no further than Tanzania. This is attributed to the local presence of the tsetse fly and in areas beyond, which likely acted as a barrier to further southern migrations by wandering pastoralists, the principal fish-avoiders. Zambia and Mozambique's Bantus were therefore spared subjugation by pastoral groups, and they consequently nearly all consume fish.

There is also another center of fish avoidance in Southern Africa, among mainly Bantu speakers. It is not clear whether this disinclination developed independently or whether it was introduced. It is certain, however, that no avoidance of fish occurs among southern Africa's earliest inhabitants, the Khoisan. Nevertheless, since the Bantu of southern Africa also share various cultural traits with the pastoralists further north in East Africa, it is believed that, at an unknown date, the taboo against the consumption of fish was similarly introduced from East Africa by cattle-herding peoples who somehow managed to get their livestock past the aforementioned tsetse fly endemic regions.

Certain species of fish are also forbidden in Judaism such as the freshwater eel (Anguillidae) and all species of catfish. Although they live in water, they appear to have no fins or scales (except under a microscope) (see Leviticus 11:10–13). Sunni Muslim laws are more flexible in this and catfish and shark are generally seen as halal as they are special types of fish. Eel is generally considered permissible in the four Sunni madh'hab, but the Ja'fari jurisprudence followed by most Shia Muslims forbids it.

Many tribes of the Southwestern United States, including the Navaho, Apache, and Zuñi, have a taboo against fish and other water-related animals, including waterfowl.

== Dishes ==
- Bokkoms
- Bouillabaisse
- Bourdeto
- Ceviche
- Cioppino
- Crab stick
- Crappit heid
- Croquette
- Curanto
- Dressed herring
- Fish and chips
- Fish ball
- Fish chowder
- Fishcake
- Fishstick
- Gefilte fish
- Kamaboko
- Kipper
- Lox
- Machher Jhol
- Paella
- Pempek
- Poke (Hawaii)
- Pompano en Papillote
- Quenelles Lyonnaises
- Rakfisk
- Remoulade
- Rissole
- Sashimi
- Seafood birdsnest
- Smoked salmon
- Soused herring
- Stargazy pie
- Surimi
- Surströmming
- Sushi
- Tuna fish sandwich
- Ukha

== See also ==
- Anisakis
- Boneless Fish
- Boning knife
- Fish head
- Fish products
- Fishmonger
- Got Mercury?
- Ichthyoallyeinotoxism
- Kudoa thyrsites
- List of fish dishes
- Lists of foods
- List of commercially important fish species
- List of seafood dishes
- Oily fish
- Maguro bōchō
- Pescetarianism
- Phosphatidylserine
- Seafood Watch
