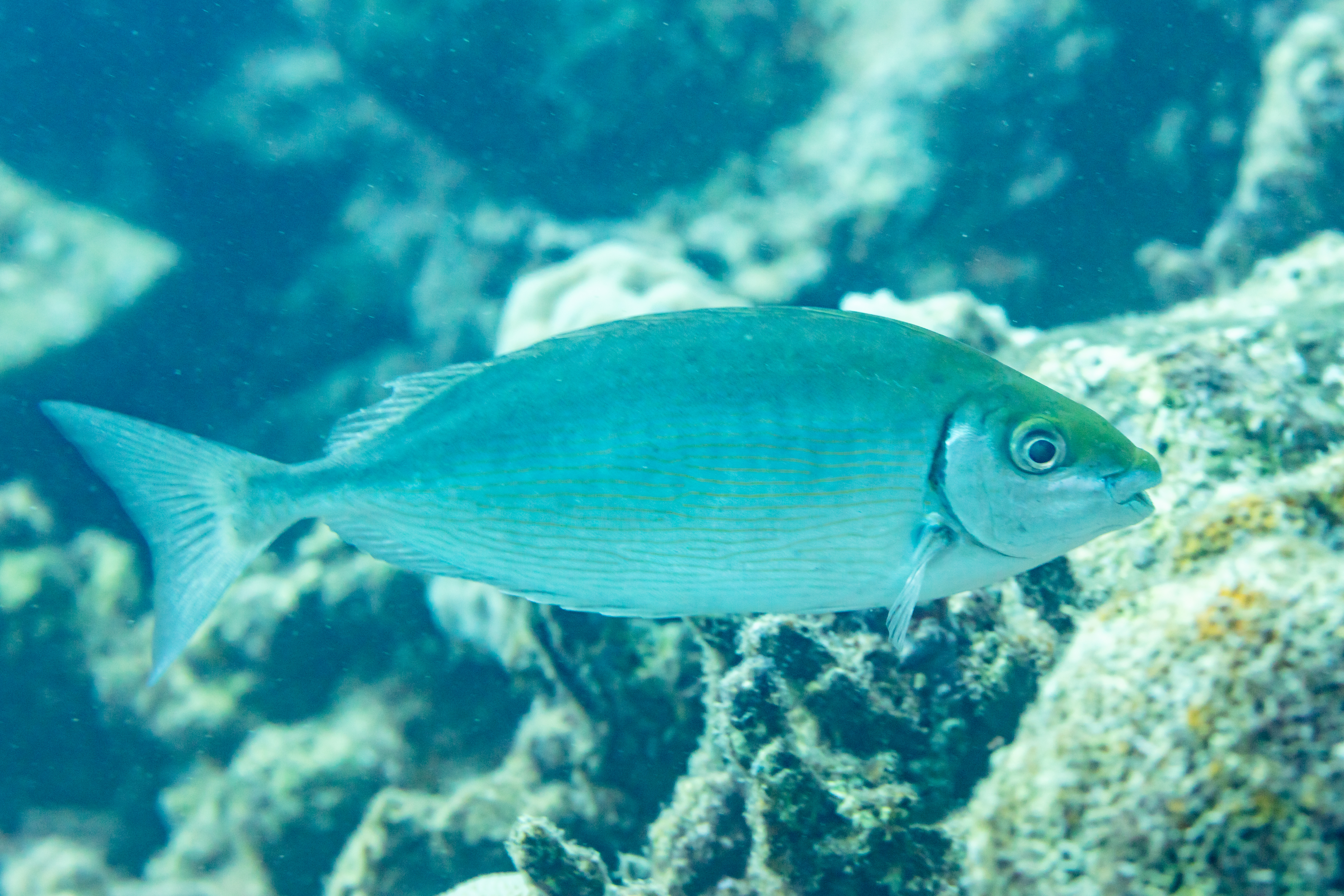

Conservation status
- Least Concern (IUCN 3.1)

Scientific classification
- Kingdom: Animalia
- Phylum: Chordata
- Class: Actinopterygii
- Division: Teleostei
- Order: Acanthuriformes
- Family: Siganidae
- Genus: Siganus
- Species: S. rivulatus

Binomial name
- Siganus rivulatus Forsskål & Niebuhr, 1775

Synonyms
- Amphacanthus rivulata (Forsskål & Niebuhr, 1775); Teuthis rivulata (Forsskål & Niebuhr, 1775); Teuthis rivulatus (Forsskål & Niebuhr, 1775); Amphacanthus siganus (Forsskål, 1775); Siganus siganus (Forsskål, 1775); Teuthis sigana (Forsskål, 1775); Teuthis siganus (Forsskål, 1775); Amphacanthus sigan Klunzinger, 1871; Teuthis sigan Klunzinger, 1871

= Siganus rivulatus =

Species of fish

Siganus rivulatus, the marbled spinefoot, rivulated rabbitfish or surf parrotfish, is a gregarious, largely herbivorous ray-finned fish of the family Siganidae. Its natural range encompasses the western Indian Ocean and the Red Sea from where it colonised the Mediterranean Sea by Lessepsian migration through the Suez Canal. It is the type species of the genus Siganus.

== Naming and taxonomy ==
The generic name is new Latin derived from the Arabic sijan which is equivalent to the English "rabbitfish", the specific name rivulatus refers to the irregular streaking. It is the type species of the genus Siganus and therefore of the monogeneric family Siganidae too. S. rivulatus was named by the Swedish zoologist Peter Forsskål and published posthumously in the book Descriptiones animalium, Flora Aegyptiaco-Arabica, which was edited and published in 1775 by his friend Carsten Niebuhr. The specific name rivulatus means "rivulated", which in turn means "irregularly marked with colour", a reference to its yellow streaks on its sides.

If the revision of the genus Siganus into three new sub-genera proposed by Kuriiwa et al in 2007 is accepted the taxonomic position of S. rivulatus is uncertain thus no names for the proposed new groupings have been established.

== Description ==
Siganus rivulatus has a laterally compressed body which has a standard length of 2.7-3.4 times the greatest body depth. The dorsal fin has 14 spines and 10 soft rays, the anal fin has 7 spines and 9 soft rays, there are 23 vertebrae and the caudal fin is slightly forked. The longest spine in the dorsal fin is shorter than the distance between the front of the eye and the posterior edge of the operculum while the length of the longest dorsal ray is equal to or less than the length of the snout. The slender spines are barbed and bear venom. The teeth are incisor-like with lateral cusps and are arranged in a single row in the jaws. The body is covered in small embedded scales, except of the midline of the underside. The colour is variable and it usually shows some darks spots and yellow wavy lines along the sides. The upper body tends to be grey-green to brown with a yellow abdomen or silvery white underside. It usually grows to around 10–20 centimetres (3.9–7.9 in), sometimes up to 27 cm in standard length but the maximum recorded size is 40 cm.

=== Venom ===
S. rivulatus, like other rabbitfish, has venom glands associated with the spines in the fins and these spines can envenomate a human if the fish is handled incorrectly. The effect is very painful but there are no records of fatalities. The venom is a heat labile protein and any site where the body has been envenomated should be treated at as high a temperature as possible, 43-46 °C. Anyone so envenomated should also be treated for possible infection too.

== Distribution ==
Siganus rivulatus has a natural range which extends along the east African coast from South Africa to the Red Sea, including the Comoros, Madagascar and the Seychelles. It was first recorded in the Mediterranean off the coast of Palestine in 1927, following entry through the Suez Canal, and is now very common in the entire eastern Basin reaching as far as the Sicily channel and parts of the Adriatic Sea.

== Biology ==
Siganus rivulatus occurs in shallow waters over substrates clothed with algae, including rocky and sandy as well as areas where the algae grows among sea grass beds at depths of less than 15m. It sometimes enters estuarine environments and so can be described as euryhaline. It is normally found in schools of 50 to several hundred fish; it prefers sheltered areas. It feeds mainly by grazing on algae.

The newly hatched fish larvae are planktonic feeders on small diatoms, as they grow they also feed on zooplankton such a copepods. The adults are mainly herbivorous, feeding mainly on algae including Polysiphonia spp and Sphacelaria spp. but have been observed feeding on ctenophores and scyphozoans in the Spring and early summer within the northern Red Sea, attacking relatively large ctenophores until the disintegrate and on the schypozoan moon jellyfish Aurelia aurita until it sinks to the bottom.

S. rivulatus reaches sexual maturity at a length of 13.7 cm. The spawning season of S. rivulatus takes place when the water temperature reaches 24–27 °C and is later in the Mediterranean, May to July, than it is in the Red Sea when the season runs through March, April and May. Spawing takes place at dusk, they are oviparous and the eggs are fertilised externally, the eggs are small, 0.5–0.6 mm in diameter and are adhesive, the adults show no parental care for the brood after spawning. The larvae are planktonic and do not feed for three days after hatching, when they are about three weeks old they undergo metamorphosis and congregate in schools which migrate into deeper water.

== Parasites ==
S. rivulatus is known to be a host of the following parasites: the Cliophoran Balantidium sigani; the copepod Bomolochus parvulus (nomen dubium); the monogeneans Tetrancistrum strophosolenus, Tetrancistrum suezicum, Glyphidohaptor plectocirra, the digenean Hexangium saudii, and the acanthocephalan Sclerocollum saudii.

A 2019 study in the Red Sea, from a chronically polluted small bay at Sharm El-Sheikh, Egypt, showed that S. rivulatus harboured Gyliauchen volubilis (Digenea), Procamallanus elatensis (Nematoda) and Sclerocollum rubrimaris (Acanthocephala); among these three parasites, only Sclerocollum rubrimaris accumulated trace metals such as Cadmium and Lead.

=== Ecological impact ===
Siganus rivulatus, together with the related Lessepsian Siganus luridus have been implicated in the creation of "barrens" off the coast of Turkey, grazing by the two fish species has reduced the complexity, biomass and biodiversity of algal communities creating an environment which is almost barren of vegetation.

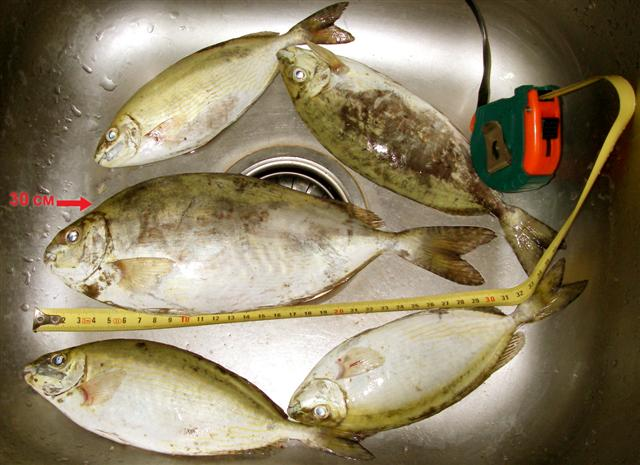
Siganus rivulatus Egypt

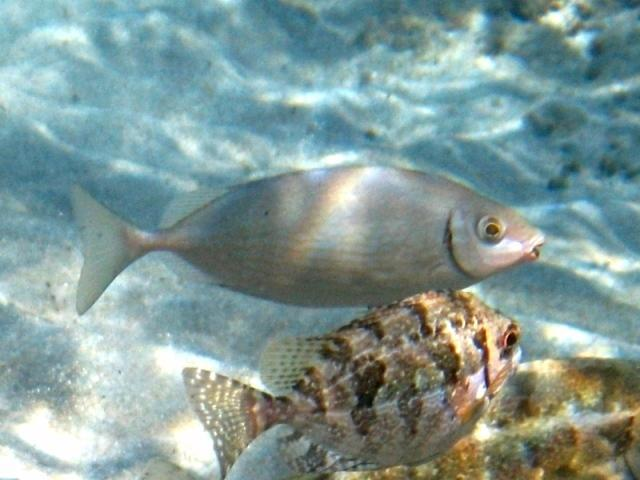
Siganus rivulatus Crete 2011

== Uses ==
=== Fisheries ===
Siganus rivulatus is a quarry species for fisheries throughout much of its distribution and can be an important component of local artisanal fisheries. It is occasionally harvested by trawling but the more usual methods are beach seines and gill nets. However, the numbers appear to be stable and there are no reported significant declines in any populations. Landings of S. rivulatus are combined with other siganid species, although data from the sampling of fish in the Red Sea suggests that the stock is subject to overexploitation there.

=== Aquaculture ===
There is ongoing research into the suitability of S. rivulatus as a suitable species for aquaculture, both in the Mediterranean and in the Red Sea. It is considered that the mainly herbivorous species may prove more sustainable than the more normal species in aquaculture such as salmonids, gadids and flatfish which are mainly carnivorous and require high protein food to grow. It has been shown that S. rivulatus can be matured and spawned in captivity, readily consumes artificial feeds, can be reared in offshore cages and has good market demand.

=== Health issues ===
S. rivulatus has been shown to be a source of ciguatoxin-like toxins and poisoning has been recorded in Israel after consuming Siganus flesh which appears to be associated with fish caught in polluted waters. It has otherwise been reported to cause hallucinations when consumed.
