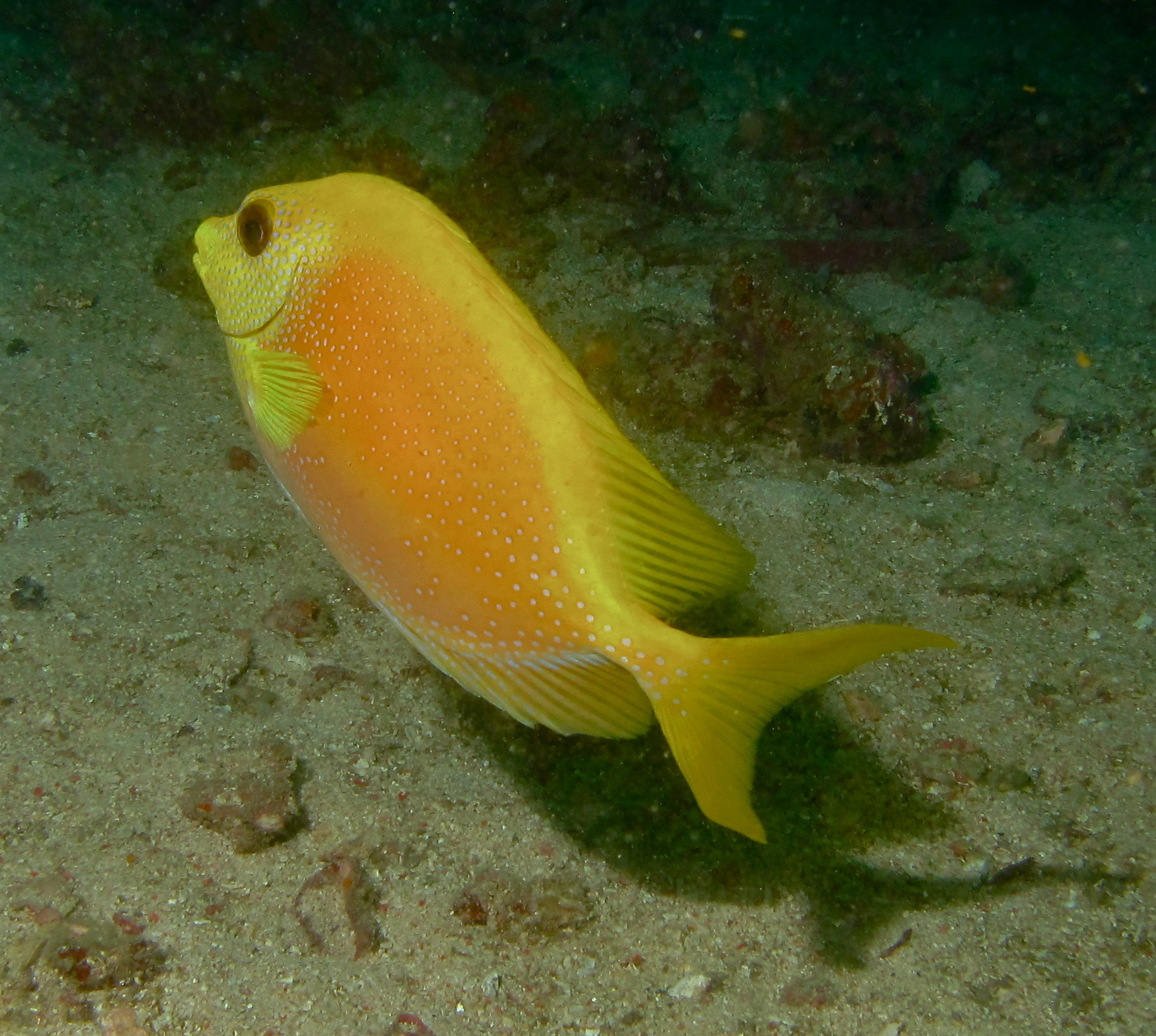

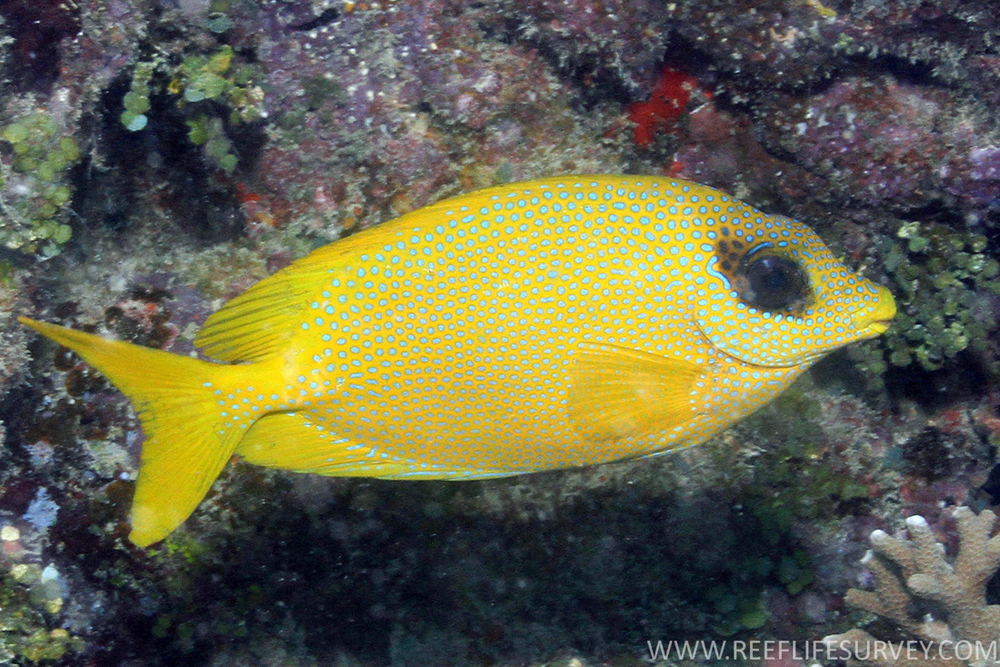
- Two colour variants: Above—Western Pacific type from Mabul Island, Malaysia; Below—Coral Sea type from Lizard Island, Australia

Conservation status
- Least Concern (IUCN 3.1)

Scientific classification
- Kingdom: Animalia
- Phylum: Chordata
- Class: Actinopterygii
- Order: Acanthuriformes
- Family: Siganidae
- Genus: Siganus
- Species: S. corallinus

Binomial name
- Siganus corallinus (Valenciennes, 1835)

Synonyms
- List: Amphacanthus corallinus Valenciennes, 1835; Teuthis corallina (Valenciennes, 1835); Teuthis corallinus (Valenciennes, 1835); Amphacanthus tetrazona Bleeker, 1855; Siganus tetrazona (Bleeker, 1855); Siganus tetrazonus (Bleeker, 1855); Teuthis tetrazona (Bleeker, 1855); Teuthis studeri Peters, 1877; Teuthis teuthopsis De Vis, 1884

= Blue-spotted spinefoot =

Species of fish

The blue-spotted spinefoot (Siganus corallinus), the coral rabbitfish, coral spinefoot, ocellated spinefoot or orange spinefoot is a species of marine ray-finned fish, a rabbitfish belonging to the family Siganidae. It is found in the Indo-Pacific where it is often caught as a food fish and occasionally as an aquarium fish.

== Taxonomy ==
The blue-spotted spinefoot was first formally described in 1835 as Amphacanthus corallinus by the French zoologist Achille Valenciennes with the type localities given as the Seychelles and Java. Some authorities recognise three species from the current taxon, the additional ones being S. studeri and S. tetrazonus. These additional taxa are based on minor differences in colour and pattern. Catalog of Fishes recognises S. corallinus and S. studeri as valid but not S. tetrazonus, FishBase only recognises S. corallinus. The specific name corallinus means "of coral", it is derived from the local name given to this species in the Seychelles, cordonnier de coral which translates as "coral cordwainer", this may be a reference to it being found in coral-rich areas of lagoons, cordonnier being a name for rabbitfishes in the Seychellois Creole and Mauritian Creole languages.

== Description ==
The blue-spotted spinefoot has a deep and compressed body with a standard length which is around twice its depth. The dorsal profile of its head has an incline of around at 45°. There is an indentation on front of the eyes and another behind the chin which makes the snout obviously protrude. There is a forward pointing spine in front of dorsal fin. The caudal fin is emarginate in juveniles with a standard length of less than 5 cm (2.0 in)but it becomes more forked with age so that it is deeply forked in subadults, the lobes of the caudal fin are sharply pointed. The dorsal fin has 13 spines and 10 soft rays while the anal fin has 7 spines and 9 soft rays. This species attains a maximum total length of 30 cm (12 in), although 20 cm (7.9 in) is more typical. The overall colour of this rabbitfish is orange-yellow marked with small blue spots on the head, breast and flanks, with a dark smudge-like mark surrounding the eye. Small juveniles have slender blue vertical lines on the flanks that break up into spots as they grow.

== Distribution and habitat ==
The blue-spotted spinefoot has a widespread Indo-West Pacific distribution. It occurs from the western Indian Ocean, where it is apparently restricted to oceanic archipelagoes such as the Seychelles and Maldives, to the western Pacific Ocean, where it occurs from the Ryukyu and Ogasawara Islands, east to New Caledonia and Vanuatu and south to Australia. In Australia is found at Rowley Shoals and Scott Reefs off Western Australia, the Ashmore Reef in the Timor Sea and on the northern Great Barrier Reef as far south as the Capricorn Islands off Queensland, it also occurs at Christmas Island. It is found at depths between 1 and 30 m (3 ft 3 in and 98 ft 5 in) in coral reefs, with the juveniles in sea grass beds.

== Biology ==
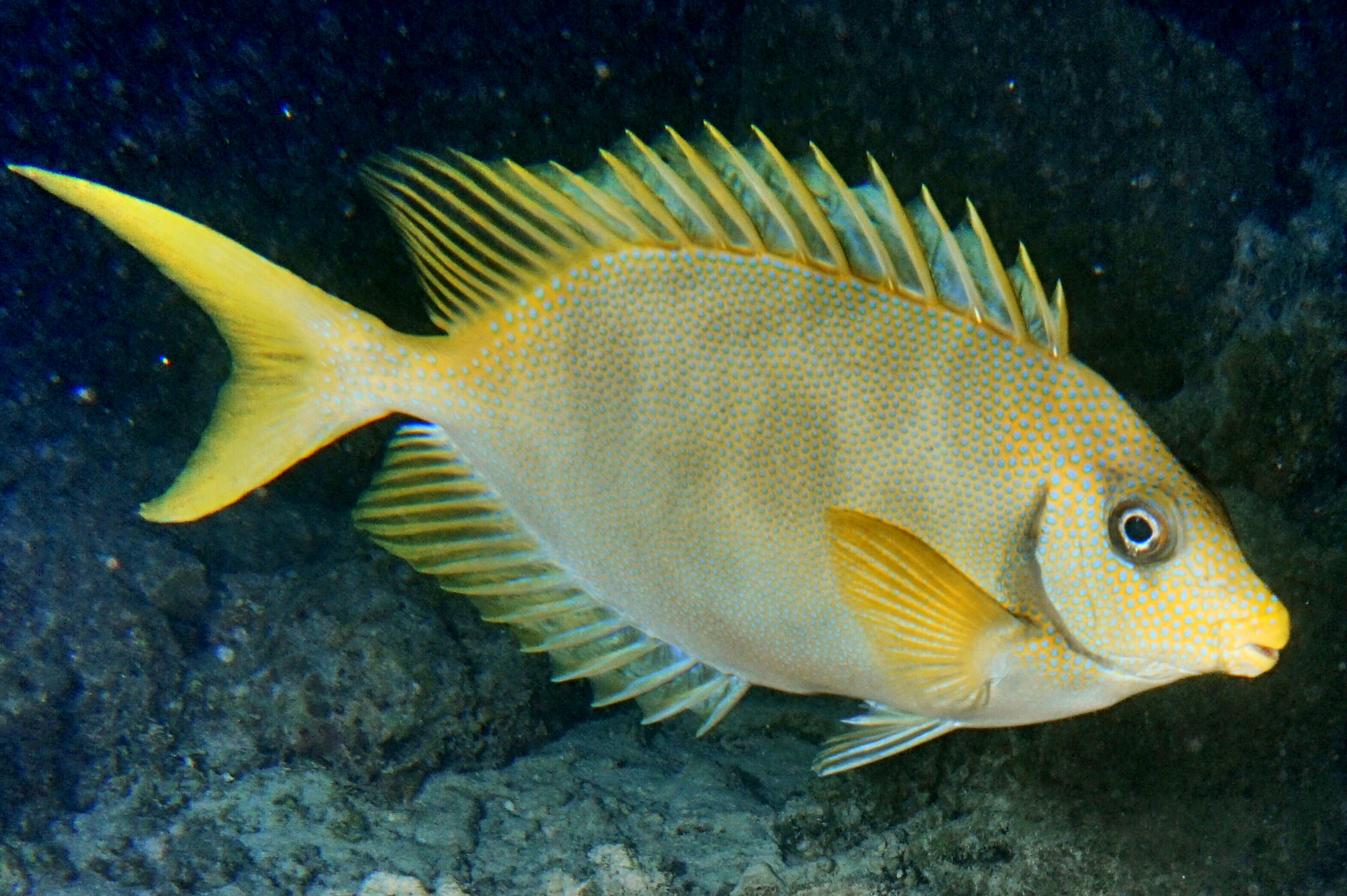
With fully extended fins, at Seychelles

Blue-spotted spinefoots school as juveniles in sea grass beds, moving into branching Acropora corals and beginning to form pairs as around 6 cm (2.4 in). Once paired, the adults are sedentary in areas of branching corals but will move into intertidal areas as they are flooded to feed. The juveniles may form mixed aggregations with parrotfishes and other rabbitfishes. The juveniles browse epiphytic algae from the leaves of sea grasses while the adults prefer macroalgae. The spines in the dorsal, anal and pectoral fins are grooved and each groove contains venom glands, the venom can cause a painful wound but it is thermolabile, i.e. it is broken down by heat. The blue-spotted spinefoot spawning is governed by the water temperature and the lunar cycle, normally occurring at dusk.

== Utilisation ==
The blue-spotted spinefoot is caught by spearfishing, and also using set nets and fish traps. Small numbers are sold fresh in markets throughout its range. It is also caught live for the aquarium trade.
