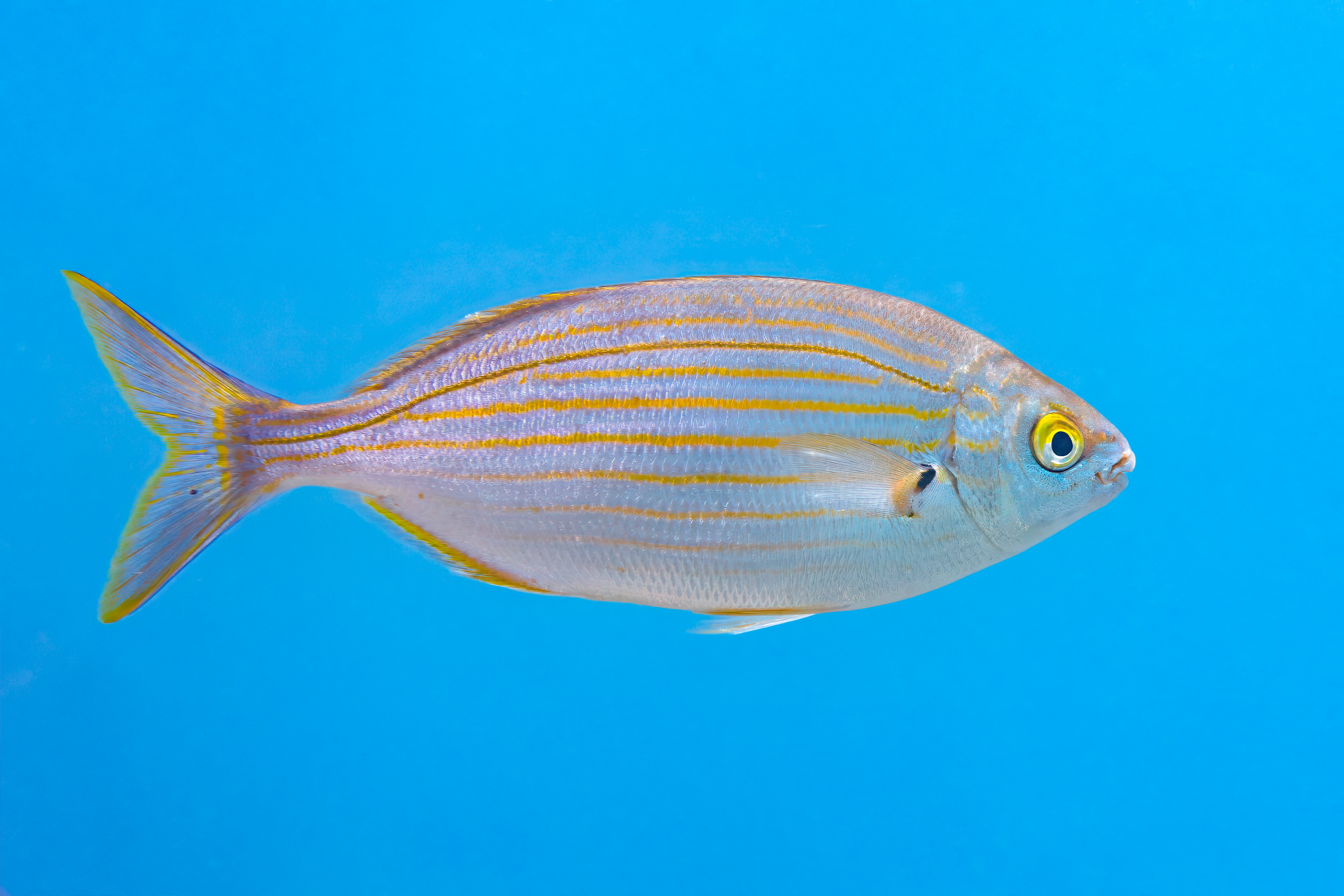
- In the Mediterranean Sea

Conservation status
- Least Concern (IUCN 3.1)

Scientific classification
- Kingdom: Animalia
- Phylum: Chordata
- Class: Actinopterygii
- Division: Teleostei
- Order: Acanthuriformes
- Family: Sparidae
- Genus: Sarpa; Bonaparte, 1831
- Species: S. salpa

Binomial name
- Sarpa salpa (Linnaeus, 1758)

Synonyms
- List: Genus synonymy; Eusalpa Fowler, 1925; Labeo Bowditch, 1825; Labeova Whitley, 1950 Species synonymy; Sparus salpa Linnaeus, 1758; Boops salpa (Linnaeus, 1758); Box salpa (Linnaeus, 1758); Eusalpa salpa (Linnaeus, 1758); Box goreensis Valenciennes, 1830; Boops goreensis (Valenciennes, 1830)

= Salema porgy =

Species of fish

The salema porgy (Sarpa salpa), also known as the dreamfish, salema, cow bream, karanteen, salpa, saupe, strepie or goldline, is a species of marine ray-finned fish belonging to the family Sparidae, which includes the seabreams and porgies. It is the only species in the monospecific genus Sarpa. It is found in the eastern Atlantic Ocean, Mediterranean Sea and southwestern Indian Ocean.

== Taxonomy ==
The salema porgy was first formally described as Sparus salpa in 1758 by Carl Linnaeus in the 10th edition of Systema Naturae, no type locality was given but it is presumed to be the Mediterranean. In 1831 Charles Lucien Bonaparte classified Sparus sarpa in a monotypic section of the genus Box. The genus Rhabdosargus is placed in the family Sparidae within the order Spariformes by the 5th edition of Fishes of the World. Some authorities classify this genus in the subfamily Sparinae, but the 5th edition of Fishes of the World does not recognise subfamilies within the Sparidae.

== Etymology ==
The salema porgy has the genus name Sarpa which is the local name for this fish in Genoa. The specific name salpa is a modern Greek rendering of the Ancient Greek salpe or salpes, which dates back at least to Aristotle.

== Distribution ==
The salema porgy is found in the East Atlantic, where it ranges from the Bay of Biscay to South Africa, as well as in the Mediterranean. It has occasionally been found as far north as Great Britain.

It is generally common and found from near the surface to a depth of 70 m (230 ft).

== Description ==
Juvenile

In the Canary Islands

The salema porgy has a moderately slender, neatly oval body which has a depth which fits into its standard length 2.8 times. The dorsal fin is supported by 11 spines and 14 or 15 soft rays while the anal fin contains 3 spines and between 13 and 15 soft rays. There are scales on the cheeks under the eyes. There is a scaly sheath at the base of the anal fin but the area between the eyes, the base of the anal fin and the flange of the preoperculum are scaleless. There is a single row of notched incisor-like teeth on the upper jaw and pointed incisor-like teeth on the lower jaw, and there are no molar-like teeth. The body is silvery with between 8 and 10 horizontal golden lines along the sides with a black spot at the base of the pectoral fin.

Males are typically 15 to 30 cm (6–12 in) in length, while females are usually 31 to 45 cm (12–18 in). The maximum size is 51 cm (20 in).

== Biology ==
=== Diet ===
Salema porgies are largely herbivorous; a study in Libya found that sea grass dominated the diet, with algae being the second most important item and crustaceans the third. Off Corsica, the seagrass Posidonia oceanica and its epiphytes were found to be the main food of adults while the juveniles were plankton eaters.

The salema porgy is a plant-herbivore and due to overpopulation in Portugal had overgrazed seagrass in the area as of 2014. Three substitutes were tested as a substitute for the Portuguese floor. Cymodocea nodosa, Zostera marina, and Zostera noltii were given to an adult S. salpa for testing. It preferred the Zostera noltii, therefore the Cymodocea nodosa and Zostera marina are preferred for seagrass restorations in areas with large populations of S. salpa.

=== Reproduction ===
In the Adriatic Sea

This species is a protandrous hermaphrodite. Off South Africa spawning takes place between April and September and there is an annual migration between nursery areas in the Eastern and Western Cape to KwaZulu-Natal. In the northern hemisphere, the spawning season in the Canary Islands was found to extend from September to March. Off Italy the change from male to female took place between total lengths of 24 and 31 cm (9.4 and 12.2 in) and this corresponded to a ages between 3 and 7 years. The size when sexual maturity was reached by half of the fish was 19.5 cm (7.7 in), and most of these fishes were males. There were two separate spawning seasons in this population one in the spring, running between March and May, and a second in autumn, from the end of September to November.

== Consumption and toxicity ==
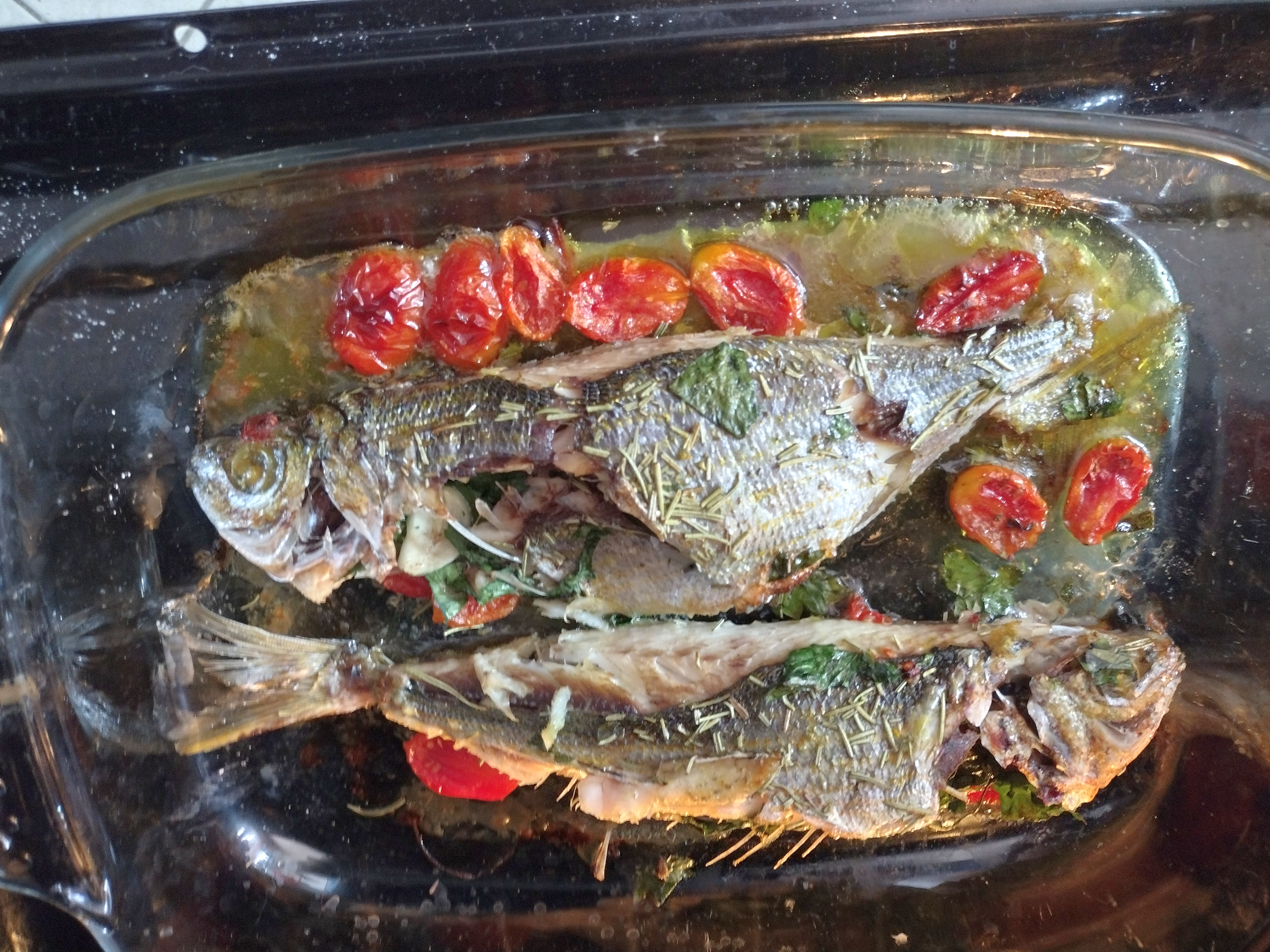
Baked salemas

The vegetarian diet of the saupe, its modest size and its living areas also make it not very vulnerable to fishing with a net or harpoon. This is why this fish is rare on plates and practically not sold. The saupe is practically no longer consumed except in France, Israel and Tunisia.

Sarpa salpa became widely known for its ichthyoallyeinotoxic effects following widely publicized articles in 2006, when two men ingested it at a Mediterranean restaurant and began to experience many auditory and visual hallucinogenic effects. These hallucinations, described as frightening, were reported to have occurred two hours after the fish was ingested and had a total duration of 36 hours.

The fish, and especially its viscera, have been assessed as potentially unsafe by a study conducted on Mediterranean specimens. Saupes are not toxic all year round but only during certain periods, which raises suspicion of the role of algal toxins or phytoplankton ingested by fish, and swarming at certain periods, which renders it ichthyoallyeinotoxic.

Since the accidental introduction of Caulerpa taxifolia into the Mediterranean, the saupe has tended to accumulate in its body the toxins produced by this alga. It is therefore recommended to empty it as soon as it is fished.
