= Sclerocollum =

Scientific classification
- Kingdom: Animalia
- Phylum: Acanthocephala
- Class: Palaeacanthocephala
- Order: Echinorhynchida
- Family: Rhadinorhynchidae
- Genus: Sclerocollum; Schmidt and Paperna, 1978

Type species
- Sclerocollum

Genus of parasitic worms

Sclerocollum is a genus in Acanthocephala (thorny-headed worms, also known as spiny-headed worms) containing four species that parasitize fish by attaching themselves to the intestines using their hook-covered proboscis. These species have been found off the coasts of Australia, New Caledonia, French Polynesia and Palau.

== Taxonomy ==
The genus was described by Schmidt and Paperna in 1978. Phylogenetic analysis has been published on Sclerocollum species.

== Description ==
Sclerocollum species consist of a proboscis covered in hooks and a trunk.

== Species ==
The genus Sclerocollum contains four species.

- Sclerocollum australis Pichelin, Smales and Cribb 2016
- Sclerocollum robustum (Edmonds, 1964)
- Sclerocollum rubrimaris Schmidt and Paperna, 1978
- Sclerocollum saudii Al-Jahdali, 2010

== Distribution ==
The distribution of Sclerocollum is determined by that of its hosts. They have been found off the coasts of Australia, New Caledonia, French Polynesia and Palau.

== Hosts ==
Life cycle of Acanthocephala. (Note: There are no known aberrant human infections for Sclerocollum species.)

The life cycle of an acanthocephalan consists of three stages beginning when an infective acanthor (development of an egg) is released from the intestines of the definitive host and then ingested by an arthropod, the intermediate host. Although the intermediate hosts of Sclerocollum are arthropods. When the acanthor molts, the second stage called the acanthella begins. This stage involves penetrating the wall of the mesenteron or the intestine of the intermediate host and growing. The final stage is the infective cystacanth which is the larval or juvenile state of an Acanthocephalan, differing from the adult only in size and stage of sexual development. The cystacanths within the intermediate hosts are consumed by the definitive host, usually attaching to the walls of the intestines, and as adults they reproduce sexually in the intestines. The acanthor is passed in the feces of the definitive host and the cycle repeats. There may be paratenic hosts (hosts where parasites infest but do not undergo larval development or sexual reproduction) for Sclerocollum.

Sclerocollum parasitizes fish. There are no reported cases of Sclerocollum infesting humans in the English language medical literature.

Hosts for Sclerocollum species

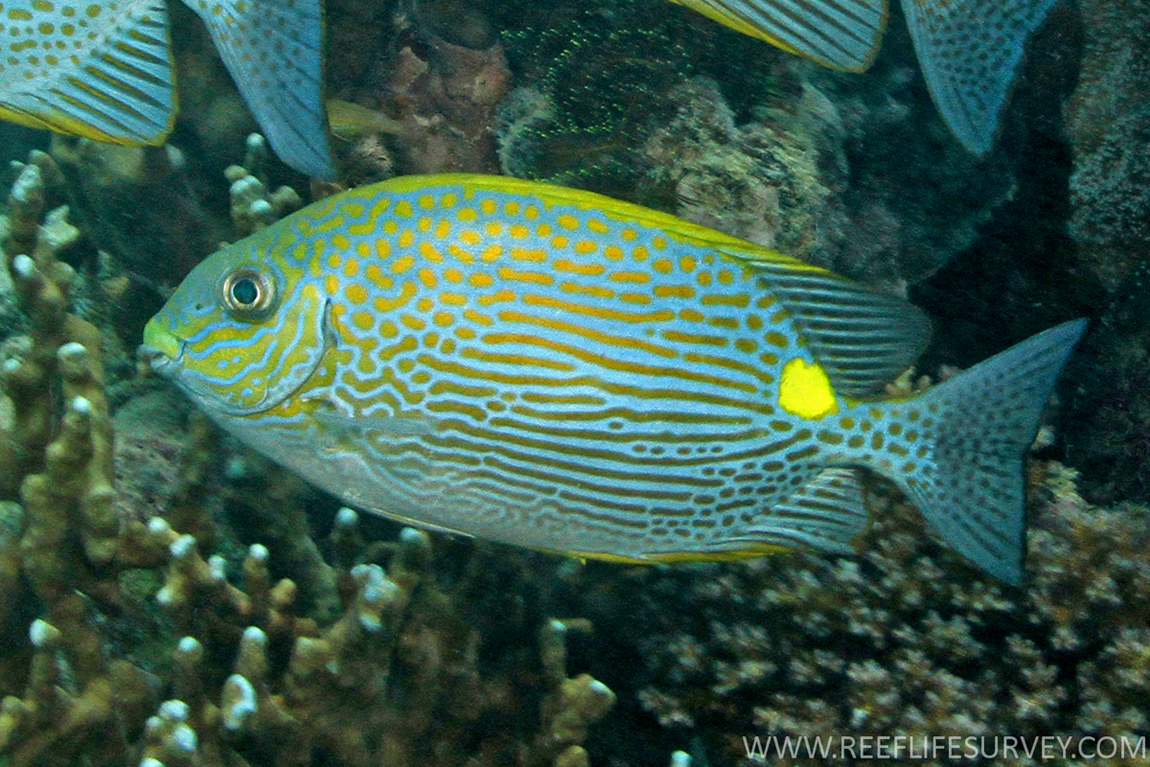
The Golden-lined spinefoot is a host for S. robustum

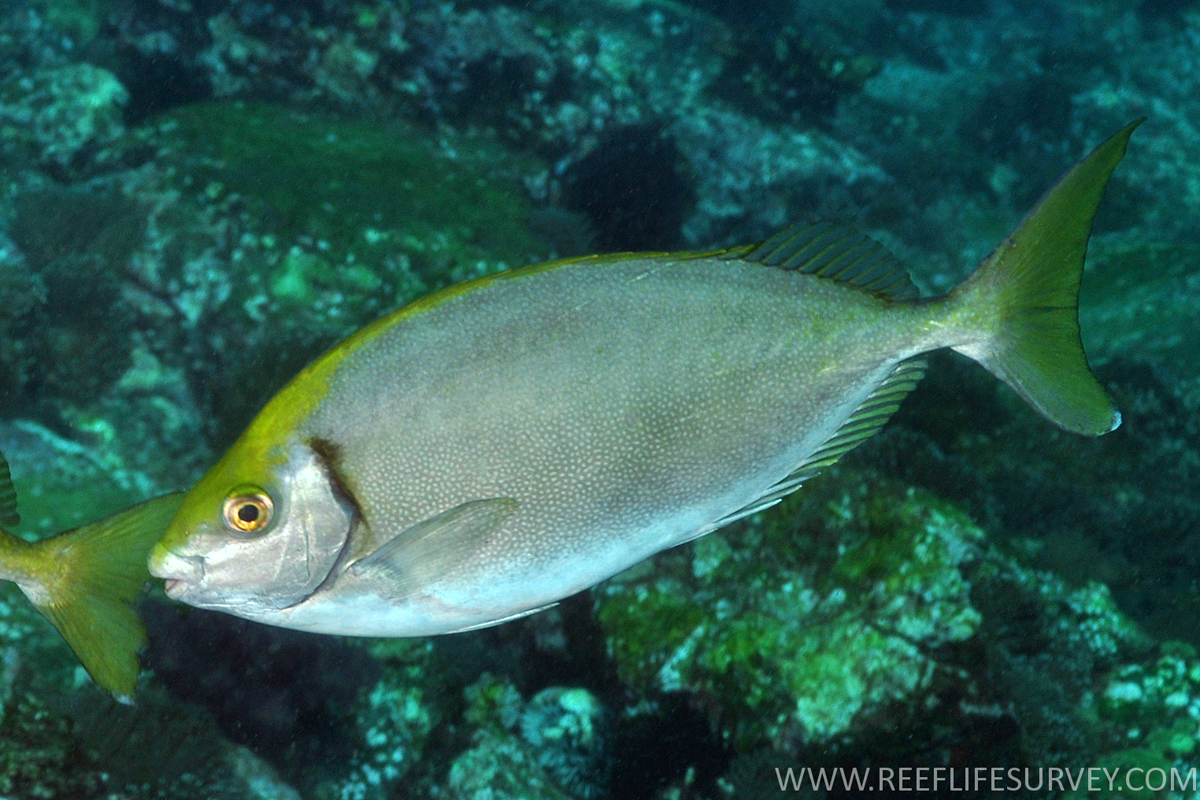
Siganus fuscescens

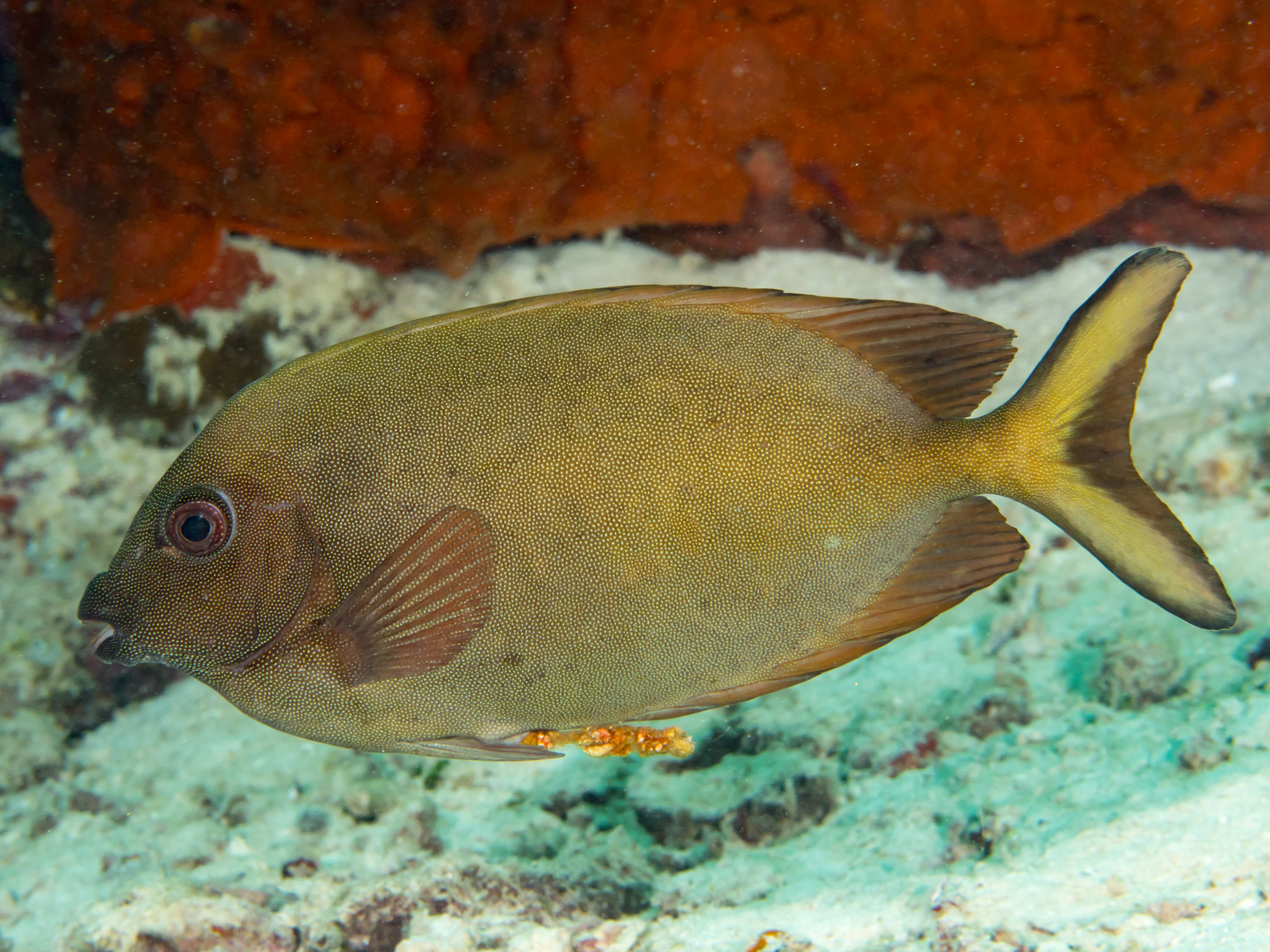
Peppered spinefoot
