= Scaritoxin =

Toxin

Names
- Other names Ciguatoxin 4A; CTX4A; (52S)-1,2,54-Trideoxy-1,2-didehydrociguatoxin

Identifiers
CAS Number	66231-73-0
3D model (JSmol)	Interactive image
ChemSpider	5004865
KEGG	C20002
PubChem CID	6437372
UNII	P251446IXQ
CompTox Dashboard (EPA)	DTXSID40880106
- InChI: InChI=1S/C60H84O16/c1-7-8-13-34-14-11-17-41-56(65-34)53(63)57-49(69-41)26-43-40(72-57)21-20-38-39(67-43)19-18-37-35(66-38)15-9-10-16-36-45(68-37)28-50(61)59(6)51(71-36)29-46-47(75-59)25-30(2)24-42-44(70-46)27-48-54(73-42)32(4)52(62)58-55(74-48)31(3)33(5)60(76-58)22-12-23-64-60/h7-11,13-14,18-21,30-58,61-63H,1,12,15-17,22-29H2,2-6H3/b10-9+,13-8+/t30-,31+,32+,33+,34+,35-,36+,37+,38+,39-,40-,41+,42+,43+,44-,45-,46+,47-,48+,49-,50-,51-,52+,53-,54-,55-,56+,57-,58+,59+,60+/m1/s1 Key: QFYRPKKCVYDHFZ-FKFYNGSCSA-N
- SMILES: C[C@@H]1C[C@H]2[C@@H](C[C@H]3[C@H](O2)[C@H]([C@@H]([C@H]4[C@H](O3)[C@H]([C@@H]([C@@]5(O4)CCCO5)C)C)O)C)O[C@H]6C[C@@H]7[C@]([C@@H](C[C@@H]8[C@@H](O7)C/C=C/C[C@@H]9[C@@H](O8)C=C[C@@H]2[C@@H](O9)C=C[C@@H]3[C@@H](O2)C[C@@H]2[C@@H](O3)[C@@H]([C@@H]3[C@@H](O2)CC=C[C@@H](O3)/C=C/C=C)O)O)(O[C@@H]6C1)C

Properties
Chemical formula	C_{60}H_{84}O_{16}
Molar mass	1061.316 g·mol^{−1}
- Except where otherwise noted, data are given for materials in their standard state (at 25 °C [77 °F], 100 kPa). Infobox references

Scaritoxin, a potent toxic substance, is a ciguatoxin with molecular formula C_{60}H_{84}O_{16}. Scaritoxin is also referred to as ciguaotoxin 4A, CTX4A. Like other ciguatoxins, CTX4A is produced by dinoflagellate Gambierdiscus toxicus and isolated from poisonous fish.

The name of scaritoxin is derived from the poisonous fish Scarus gibus, which is now known as the Chlorurus gibbus family of the Scaridae. Namely, ciguatoxins accumulate in various fish species via the food chain as a result of biotransformation of the precursor gambiertoxins produced by Gambierdiscus toxicus. Since CTX4A was identified in Gambierdiscus toxicus and in parrotfish, the first link in the food chain, it was concluded that Gambierdiscus toxicus is the biogenetic origin of ciguatera toxins found in fish. Ciguatoxins, CTX-group toxins, generally accumulate in the skin, head, viscera, and roe of big reef fish

Ingestion of these fish with accumulated CTX-group toxins, marine biotoxins, results in ciguatera fish poisoning (CFP). Poisoning with scaritoxin, however, is not well described.

== Ciguatera poisoning ==
Ciguatera fish poisoning (CFP) is a clinical syndrome caused by eating fish containing accumulated ciguatoxins (CTXs), marine biotoxins, due to feeding on toxic microalgae. Traditional endemic regions for ciguatoxic fish include areas in the Caribbean sea and the Pacific and Indians oceans, but autochthonous outbreaks have also been reported in Europe. The accumulated ciguatoxins remain stable at various temperatures, meaning they are not eliminated through cooking or freezing fish. Additionally, these toxins lack color, odor, and flavor, making it impossible to detect them by taste or smell.

Fatality risks from CFP arise from cardio-respiratory failure. CFP stands as the most prevalent marine biotoxin food poisoning globally, affecting an estimated 10.000 to 50.000 individuals annually. Associated to ciguatera fish poisoning is primarily the consumption of large predator fish, which accumulate CTX-group toxins by preying on smaller contaminated coral reef fish. However, ciguatoxins rarely accumulate in fish at levels that are lethal to humans, so CFP comes along with a low mortality rate, but a significant high morbidity rate.

=== Metabolism ===
Generally, ciguatoxins produced by the causative Gambierdiscus toxicus exist in multiple forms as a result of biotransformation by passage through the food web. Through the biotransformation and the acid catalyzed Spiro isomerization of gambiertoxin, they arise in the fish. It is said that the toxins undergo varying extents of biotransformation, but very little is known about the specifics. The different digestive strategies among the herbivores and carnivores are possibly influencing the nature of the toxin biotransformation via the marine food chain.

== Symptoms and side effects ==
Symptoms of ciguatera fish poisoning in humans include several effects which are mainly gastrointestinal, cardiovascular, and neurological. The symptoms of acute ciguatera fish poisoning can already start 30 minutes after eating contaminated fish. However, in milder cases the first symptoms arise 24 to 48 hours later. The initial symptoms may include itching, tingling, and numbness of the lips, tongue, hands, throat and/or feet. During the first 6 to 17 hours gastrointestinal symptoms like abdominal cramps, nausea, vomiting, diarrhea, and/or a red skin rash (pruritus), can occur. Accompanying these gastrointestinal symptoms, neurological symptoms become prominent 3 to 48 hours after eating of the contaminated fish. Moreover, chills, hot and cold temperature reversal, generalized weakness, restlessness, dizziness, wheezing, blurred vision, abnormal sensitivity to light (photophobia), muscle aches (myalgias), and joint pain (arthralgias) can also occur.

The severe symptoms of ciguatera fish poisoning disappear generally disappear after a few days, but the neurological symptoms can remain present for months. Abnormally low blood pressure upon standing from a seated position (orthostatic hypotension) is a symptom of CFP that can be experienced. Severe instances may proceed quickly to muscle paralysis and dyspnoea, which are breathing difficulties. Acute cases that progress to life-threatening consequences (irregularly slow heartbeat, respiratory arrest, convulsions, or coma) happen within 24 hours.

Poisoning with scaritoxin actually emerges in two stages. The first set of symptoms resemble typical ciguatera poisoning as described. The second stage, developing five to ten days after the initial symptoms, start with failure of equilibration and marked locomotor ataxia. There is no known antidote, medication or treatment for scaritoxin poisoning. Medical care towards CFP-patients consists of supportive care, varying with the symptoms a patient shows.

== Structure ==
Scaritoxin is a rather large lipid soluble polycyclic polyether toxin with molecular formula C_{60}H_{84}O_{16}. The compound contains 31 defined stereo-centres, one E/Z centre and its optical activity is unspecified. The structure contains 13 rings fused by ether linkages, which make the structure of scaritoxin into a rigid ladder like-structure. Because of its rigidity the structure is known not to be affected by heat and acidic or basic conditions.

== Mechanism of action ==
Scaritoxin, recognized as a potent toxin, induces diverse effects across various biological systems through its interaction with specific cellular receptors or ion channels, thereby initiating notable physiological alterations. A guinea-pig vas deferens investigation characterizes a pronounced excitatory impact of scaritoxin, indicative of its engagement with receptors or ion channels within smooth muscle cells, precipitating muscle contraction and heightened excitability. Additionally, investigations into the autonomic effects of scaritoxin on animals suggest potential interactions with receptors or ion channels within the autonomic nervous system, utilizing influence over parameters such as heart rate, cardiac function, and other autonomic-controlled processes. Alternative mechanisms, including a hypothesized digitalis-like effect due to the cyclopentanone ring present in the scaritoxin molecule, validates consideration.

Notably, a separate inquiry observed that a medication employed for arrhythmia prevention could diminish scaritoxin-induced cardiac detriment, implying a tendency of scaritoxin to induce arrhythmias or other harmful cardiac manifestations, possibly through modulation of specific components within the cardiac electrical conduction system.

The mechanism of action for scaritoxin is not clearly defined, but knowing it is a ciguatoxin it is likely to follow the same mechanism. It is said that the toxin bind and modulate the activity of cell membrane voltage-gated sodium channels. Ciguatoxins bind on the alpha subunit at site 5, this induces the opening of the channels at resting membrane potential. This activation of voltage-gated sodium channels in cell membranes thus increases the sodium ion permeability, which causes membrane depolarization and thereby spontaneous action potentials. As a result the neuronal tissue has decreased conduction velocity and neurotransmission.

== Toxicity ==
Since the feeding history of fish and the population of alga causing ciguatera fish poisoning, the toxicity of individual fish is very unpredictable. The fish that carry scaritoxin in their flesh do not seem to be harmed by it. Testing for scaritoxin in these fish is not a standard practice and it is really difficult to prevent scaritoxin poisoning since toxin is not harmed by heat, acid or basic conditions and cannot be detected with taste or smell.

The lethal dose fifty (LD_{50}) of scaritoxin administered intraperitoneally in mice was determined to be 50 micrograms per kilogram. This denotes a pronounced toxicity of scaritoxin towards mice, presumably due to its disruptive effects on vital physiological mechanisms or harmful impacts on organ systems. This translates for an average human of around 70 kilograms to 3.5 milligrams, hence this shows that a small amount can potentially cause significant harm to humans. However, directly translation of the results from mice to humans is not a reliable source to draw specific conclusions from about the toxicity for humans.
