= Ichthyoallyeinotoxism =

Hallucination caused by eating certain species of fish

Ichthyoallyeinotoxism, or hallucinogenic fish inebriation, comes from eating certain species of fish found in several parts of the tropics, the effects of which are reputed to be similar in some aspects to LSD. Experiences may include vivid auditory and visual hallucinations. This has given rise to the collective common name "dream fish" for ichthyoallyeinotoxic fish.

The species most commonly claimed to be capable of producing this kind of toxicity include several species from the genus Kyphosus, including Kyphosus fuscus, K. cinerascens, and K. vaigiensis. It is unclear whether the toxins are produced by the fish themselves or by marine algae in their diet, but a dietary origin may be more likely.

Sarpa salpa, a species of bream, can induce LSD-like hallucinations if it is eaten. These widely distributed coastal fish are called "the fish that make dreams" in Arabic. In 2006, two men who ate fish, apparently Sarpa salpa caught in the Mediterranean, were affected by ichthyoallyeinotoxism and experienced hallucinations lasting for several days.

Other hallucinogenic fish are Siganus spinus, called "the fish that inebriates" in Reunion Island, and Mulloides flavolineatus (formerly Mulloidichthys samoensis), called "the chief of ghosts" in Hawaii.

== See also ==
- 5-Bromo-DMT
- Entheogen
- Poisonous fish
- Venomous fish
