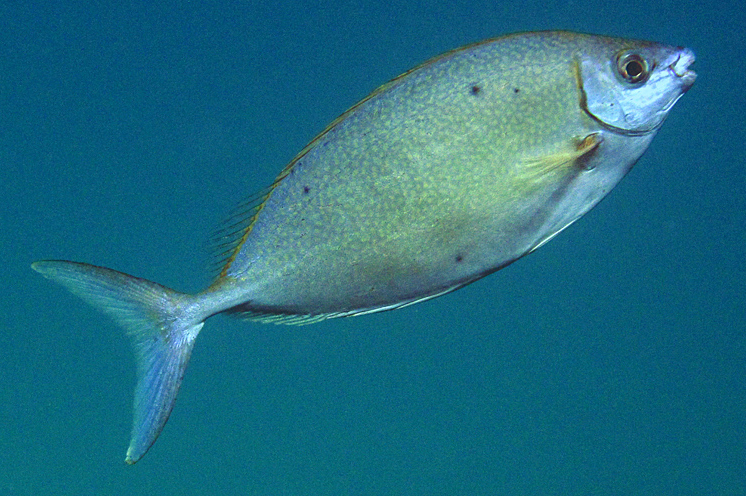

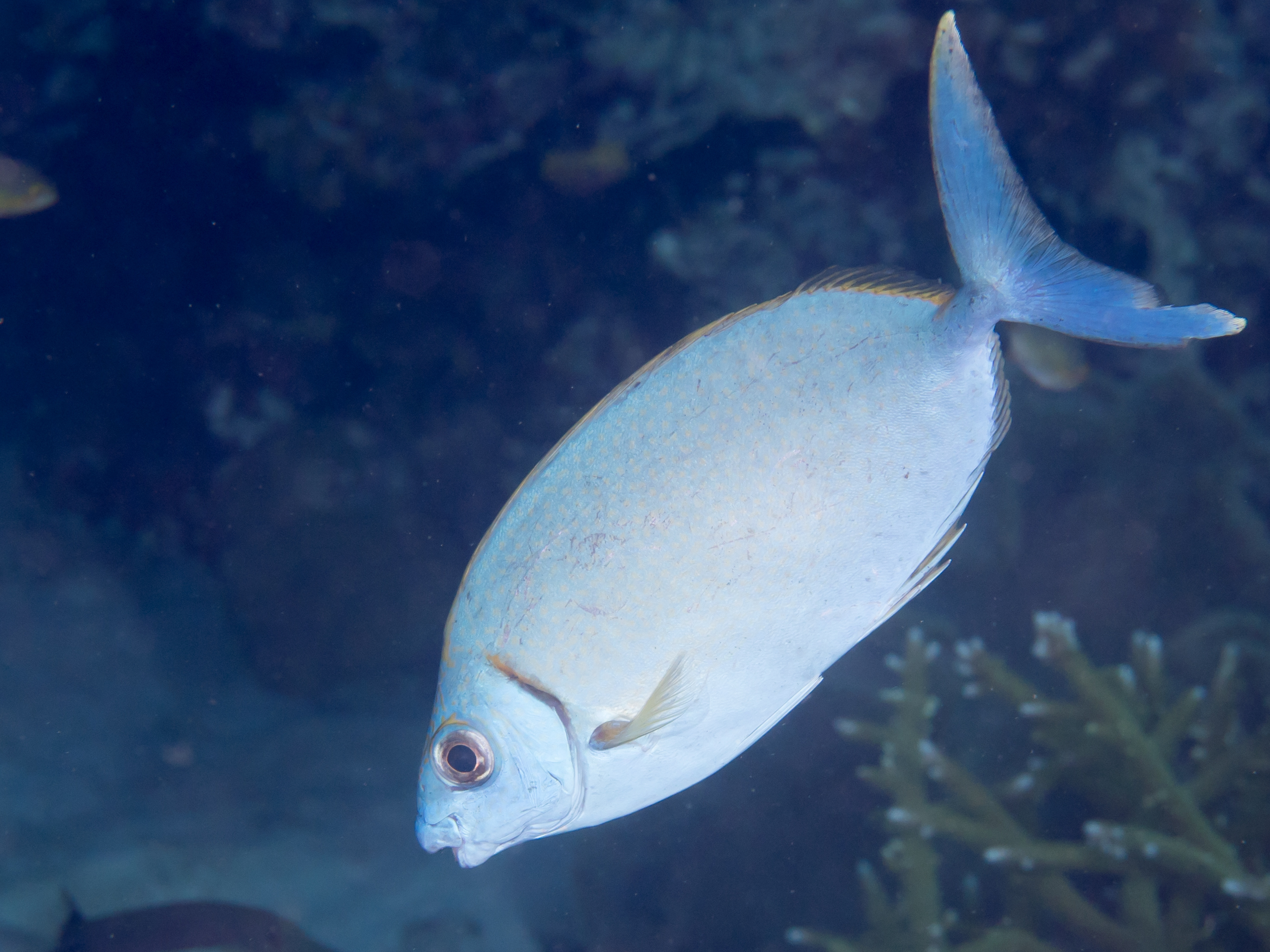
- At Great Barrier Reef, Australia (above), and Raja Ampat, Indonesia (below)

Conservation status
- Least Concern (IUCN 3.1)

Scientific classification
- Kingdom: Animalia
- Phylum: Chordata
- Class: Actinopterygii
- Order: Acanthuriformes
- Family: Siganidae
- Genus: Siganus
- Species: S. argenteus

Binomial name
- Siganus argenteus (Quoy & Gaimard, 1825)

Synonyms
- List: Amphacanthus argenteus Quoy & Gaimard, 1825; Teuthis argentea (Quoy & Gaimard, 1825); Amphacanthus rostratus Valenciennes, 1835; Siganus rostratus (Valenciennes, 1835); Teuthis rostrata (Valenciennes, 1835); Teuthis rostratus (Valenciennes, 1835); Amphacanthus mertensii Valenciennes, 1835; Teuthis oligosticta Kner, 1868; Teuthis vitianus Sauvage, 1882; Siganus vitianus (Sauvage, 1882)

= Streamlined spinefoot =

Species of fish

The streamlined spinefoot (Siganus argenteus), also known as the forktail rabbitfish, schooling rabbitfish or silver spinefoot, is a species of marine ray-finned fish, a rabbitfish belonging to the family Siganidae. It is found in the Indo-Pacific region.

== Taxonomy ==
The streamlined spinefoot was first formally described in 1825 as Amphacanthus argenteus by the French naturalists Jean René Constant Quoy and Joseph Paul Gaimard with the type locality given as Guam in the Marianas. The specific name argenteus means "silvery", a reference to the silver colour of the cheeks and lower body.

== Description ==
The streamlined spinefoot has a body which is oval, compressed, slender and fusiform, the body has a standard length which is 2.4 to 3 times its depth. The small head does not have a steep dorsal profile byt has a pointed snout. The front nostril has a flap which extends past the rear nostril. There is a procumbent spine at the front of the dorsal fin which is enclosed in the skin of the nape. The dorsal fin contains 13 spines and 10 soft rays while the anal fin has 7 spines and 9 soft rays. The caudal fin has a deep fork. This species attains a maximum total length of 40 cm (16 in), although 25 cm (9.8 in) is more typical. The colours of this species are that blue on the upper body with a silvery lower body. They frequently have variable markings, spots and curved lines, particularly on the lower flanks. The eye has a silvery-yellow iris. The axil of pectoral fin is yellow and there is normally a yellow stripe along the base of the dorsal fin. There is also a dark brown bar on the upper edge of the operculum. This fish changes colour when alarmed or asleep to pale and dark brown mottling, with dark areas forming 7 diagonal zones across the flanks and the fins becoming mottled.

== Distribution and habitat ==
The streamlined spinefoot has a wide Indo-Pacific distribution from the Red Sea south to Mozambique and Madagascar and east into the Pacific Ocean as far as Pitcairn Island, north to Japan and south to Australia. In Australia it is distributed from the area of Shark Bay in Western Australia to the Ashmore Reef in the Timor Sea, and on the east coast from the northern Great Barrier Reef near Cape York south to Moreton Bay in Queensland, it also occurs on reefs in the Coral Sea and at the Cocos (Keeling) Islands. It has been recorded once in the Mediterranean Sea off Libya but how this specimen reached there is uncertain. At remote islands such as Rapa, Pitcairn and the Line Islands this species may be the only rabbitfish present. It occurs at depths down to 40 m (130 ft) in lagoons, on reefs, and in seaweed and seagrass beds.

== Biology ==
The streamlined spinefoot is normally found in large, fast swimming schools on the water column clear of the seabed, every now and again they all dive down to the substrare to feed. Juveniles and adults may be encountered in small schools of 2–100 individuals near coral reefs, usually in the surge zone on the edge of the reef. Juveniles inhabit the water close to the surface in dense schools as far as several kilometres offshore, moving on to reef flats just before metamorphosis. The streamlined spinefoot has a diet made up of red and green macroalgae and it is one of the few herbivorous fishes that is able to eat the chemically rich macroalgae Chlorodesmis fastigata, however, this algae may only be eaten opportunistically and is likely a minor part of the total diet. They have spines which can inject venom into an attacker.

Unusually for a rabbitfish, the streamlined spinefoot is a pelagic spawner and has a relatively long larval stage and a unique prejuvenile stage. These long developmental stages allow it to disperse widely and make the species less vulnerable than its congeners to overfishing.

== Fisheries ==
Streamlined spinefoot are frequently recorded in markets in parts of their range, both as juveniles and adults. The pre-juveniles are taken as they migrate to reef flat areas in a brief but important part of local fisheries, e.g. in Guam. They are consumed fresh, pickled in brine, or made into fish paste.
