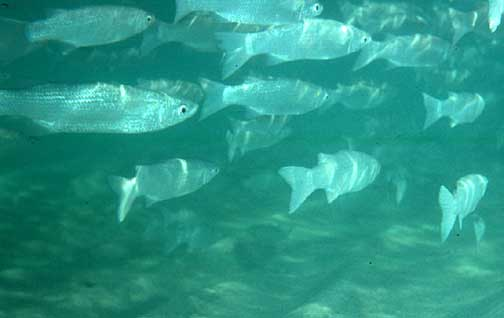

Scientific classification
- Kingdom: Animalia
- Phylum: Chordata
- Class: Actinopterygii
- Order: Mugiliformes
- Family: Mugilidae
- Genus: Neomyxus; Steindachner, 1878
- Species: N. leuciscus

Binomial name
- Neomyxus leuciscus (Günther, 1872)

= Neomyxus =

Genus of ray-finned fishes

Neomyxus leuciscus, the acute-jawed mullet, is a species of mullet found in the tropical west and central Pacific Ocean. It is the only species in the genus Neomyxus.

== Taxonomy ==
Some older publications used the name Neomyxus chaptalli, but the holotype of Mugil chaptalli, MNHN 8100, is actually a specimen of the flathead grey mullet, rendering leuciscus the correct name for the sharp-nosed mullet.
