= Diplosentis =

Scientific classification
- Kingdom: Animalia
- Phylum: Acanthocephala
- Class: Palaeacanthocephala
- Order: Echinorhynchida
- Family: Diplosentidae
- Genus: Diplosentis; Tubangui & Masiluñgan, 1937

Genus of parasitic worms

Diplosentis is a genus in Acanthocephala (thorny-headed worms, also known as spiny-headed worms).

== Taxonomy ==
The genus was described by Tubangui & Masiluñgan in 1937 and is the type genus for the family Diplosentidae. The National Center for Biotechnology Information does not indicate that any phylogenetic analysis has been published on any Diplosentis species that would confirm its position as a unique genus in the family Diplosentidae. There was controversy over the taxonomy, with the latest review finding only 2 species in the genus.

== Description ==
Diplosentis species consist of a proboscis covered in hooks and a trunk.

== Species ==
The genus Diplosentis contains two species.

- Diplosentis amphacanthi Tubangui & Masilungan, 1937

D. amphacanthi was collected in the Philippines exclusively from the White-spotted spinefoot (Siganus canaliculatus but reported as the synonym Amphacanthus oramin) which occurs widely in the tropical Indo-Pacific. It is the type species. It was specifically found in Mindanao.

- Diplosentis manteri Gupta & Fatma, 1979

D. manteri was described from a single specimen from the Threadfin sea catfish (Arius arius) in India.

== Distribution ==
The distribution of Diplosentis is determined by that of its hosts.

== Hosts ==
Life cycle of Acanthocephala. (Note: There are no known aberrant human infections for Diplosentis species.)

The life cycle of an acanthocephalan consists of three stages beginning when an infective acanthor (development of an egg) is released from the intestines of the definitive host and then ingested by an arthropod, the intermediate host. Although the intermediate hosts of Diplosentis are arthropods. When the acanthor molts, the second stage called the acanthella begins. This stage involves penetrating the wall of the mesenteron or the intestine of the intermediate host and growing. The final stage is the infective cystacanth which is the larval or juvenile state of an Acanthocephalan, differing from the adult only in size and stage of sexual development. The cystacanths within the intermediate hosts are consumed by the definitive host, usually attaching to the walls of the intestines, and as adults they reproduce sexually in the intestines. The acanthor is passed in the feces of the definitive host and the cycle repeats. There may be paratenic hosts (hosts where parasites infest but do not undergo larval development or sexual reproduction) for Diplosentis.

Diplosentis species parasitize fish. There are no reported cases of Diplosentis infesting humans in the English language medical literature.

Hosts for Diplosentis species

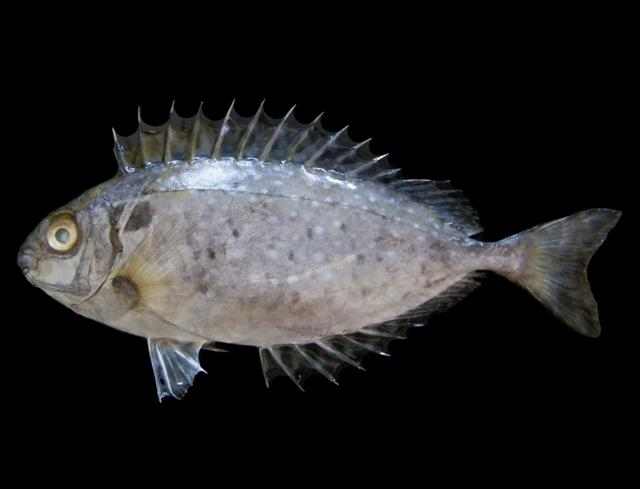
The white-spotted spinefoot is a host for D. amphacanthi

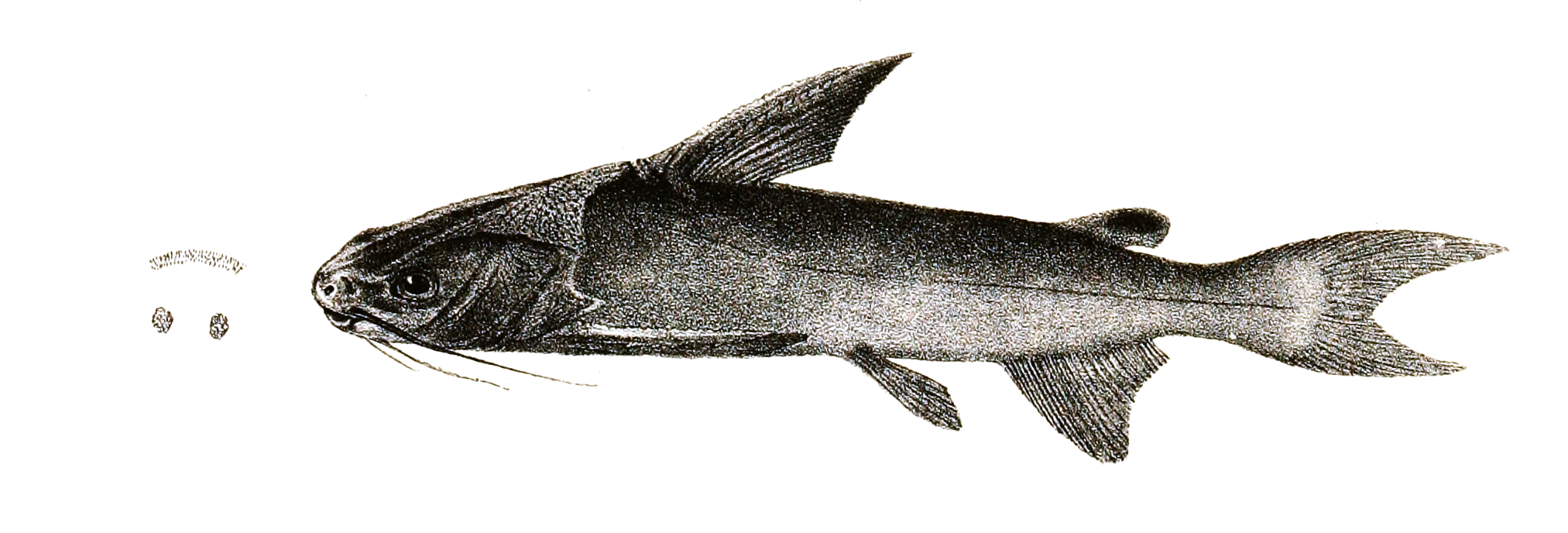
The Threadfin sea catfish is a host for D. manteri
