= Paratrajectura =

Scientific classification
- Kingdom: Animalia
- Phylum: Acanthocephala
- Class: Palaeacanthocephala
- Order: Echinorhynchida
- Family: Transvenidae
- Genus: Paratrajectura; Amin, Heckmann & Ali, 2018
- Species: P. longcementglandatus

Binomial name
- Paratrajectura longcementglandatus Amin, Heckmann & Ali, 2018

Genus of parasitic worms

Paratrajectura is a genus of Acanthocephala (thorny-headed or spiny-headed parasitic worms) containing a single known species, P. longcementglandatus.

The life cycle of T. aphanii remains unknown, but in common with other acanthocephalans, it likely involves a complex life cycle with at least two hosts. The intermediate host of Triaspiron has not been definitively identified, but it is believed to be an arthropod. Within this host, the larvae develop into an infectious stage called a cystacanth. When a vertebrate consumes the intermediate host, the cystacanths enter the vertebrate's intestines where they mature into adult worms and reproduce sexually, and it becomes the definitive host. The resulting eggs are expelled and hatch into new larvae.

== Taxonomy ==
The National Center for Biotechnology Information does not indicate that any phylogenetic analysis has been published on Triaspiron that would confirm its position as a unique order in the family Quadrigyridae.

== Description ==
This worm consists of a proboscis and trunk.

== Distribution ==
The distribution of P. longcementglandatus is determined by that of its hosts, which are found in Iran and Iraq.

== Hosts ==
Life cycle of Acanthocephala. (Note: A 2001 survey of the literature found no known cases of human infection by P. longcementglandatus.)

The life cycle of an acanthocephalan consists of three stages beginning when an infective acanthor (development of an egg) is released from the intestines of the definitive host and then ingested by an arthropod, the intermediate host. Although the intermediate hosts of Paratrajectura are not known. When the acanthor molts, the second stage called the acanthella begins. This stage involves penetrating the wall of the mesenteron or the intestine of the intermediate host and growing. The final stage is the infective cystacanth which is the larval or juvenile state of an Acanthocephalan, differing from the adult only in size and stage of sexual development. The cystacanths within the intermediate hosts are consumed by the definitive host, usually attaching to the walls of the intestines, and as adults they reproduce sexually in the intestines. The acanthor is passed in the feces of the definitive host and the cycle repeats. There are no known paratenic hosts (hosts where parasites infest but do not undergo larval development or sexual reproduction) for Paratrajectura.

There are no reported cases of any Paratrajectura species infesting humans in the English language medical literature.
