= Transvena =

Scientific classification
- Kingdom: Animalia
- Phylum: Acanthocephala
- Class: Palaeacanthocephala
- Order: Echinorhynchida
- Family: Transvenidae
- Genus: Transvena; Pichelin & Cribb, 2001

Species
- Transvena annulospinosa; Transvena pichelinae

Genus of parasitic worms

Transvena is a genus of acanthocephalans (thorny-headed or spiny-headed parasitic worms) containing a two species, T. annulospinosa and T. pichelinae, which parasitizes vertebrate hosts.

== Taxonomy ==
The genus and its type species, T. annulospinosa, were described by Pichelin & Cribb in 2001. Genetic analysis has been conducted.

== Description ==
Transvena possess a cylindrical trunk and an armed proboscis bearing multiple rows of hooks.

== Species ==
There are two valid species in the genus Transvena.

- Transvena annulospinosa Pichelin & Cribb, 2001
- Transvena pichelinae Lisitsyna, Kudlai, Cribb & Smit, 2019

== Distribution ==
The distribution of T. annulospinosa and T. pichelinae depends on that of its vertebrate hosts, as the parasite completes its life cycle within them.

== Hosts ==
Life cycle of Acanthocephala. (Note: There are no known aberrant human infections for Transvena.)

The life cycle of an acanthocephalan consists of three stages beginning when an infective acanthor (development of an egg) is released from the intestines of the definitive host and then ingested by an arthropod, the intermediate host. Although the intermediate hosts of Transvena are arthropods. When the acanthor molts, the second stage called the acanthella begins. This stage involves penetrating the wall of the mesenteron or the intestine of the intermediate host and growing. The final stage is the infective cystacanth which is the larval or juvenile state of an Acanthocephalan, differing from the adult only in size and stage of sexual development. The cystacanths within the intermediate hosts are consumed by the definitive host, usually attaching to the walls of the intestines, and as adults they reproduce sexually in the intestines. The acanthor is passed in the feces of the definitive host and the cycle repeats. There may be paratenic hosts (hosts where parasites infest but do not undergo larval development or sexual reproduction) for Transvena.

Transvena parasitizes animals. There are no reported cases of Transvena species infesting humans in the English language medical literature.

Hosts for Transvena

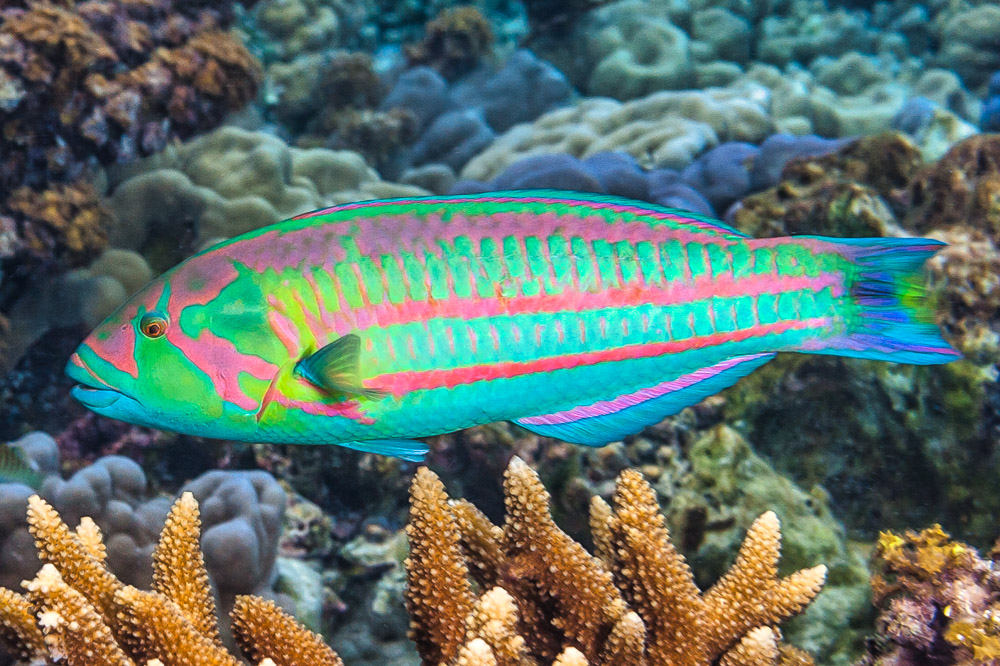
The Surge wrasse is a host of T. pichelinae.
