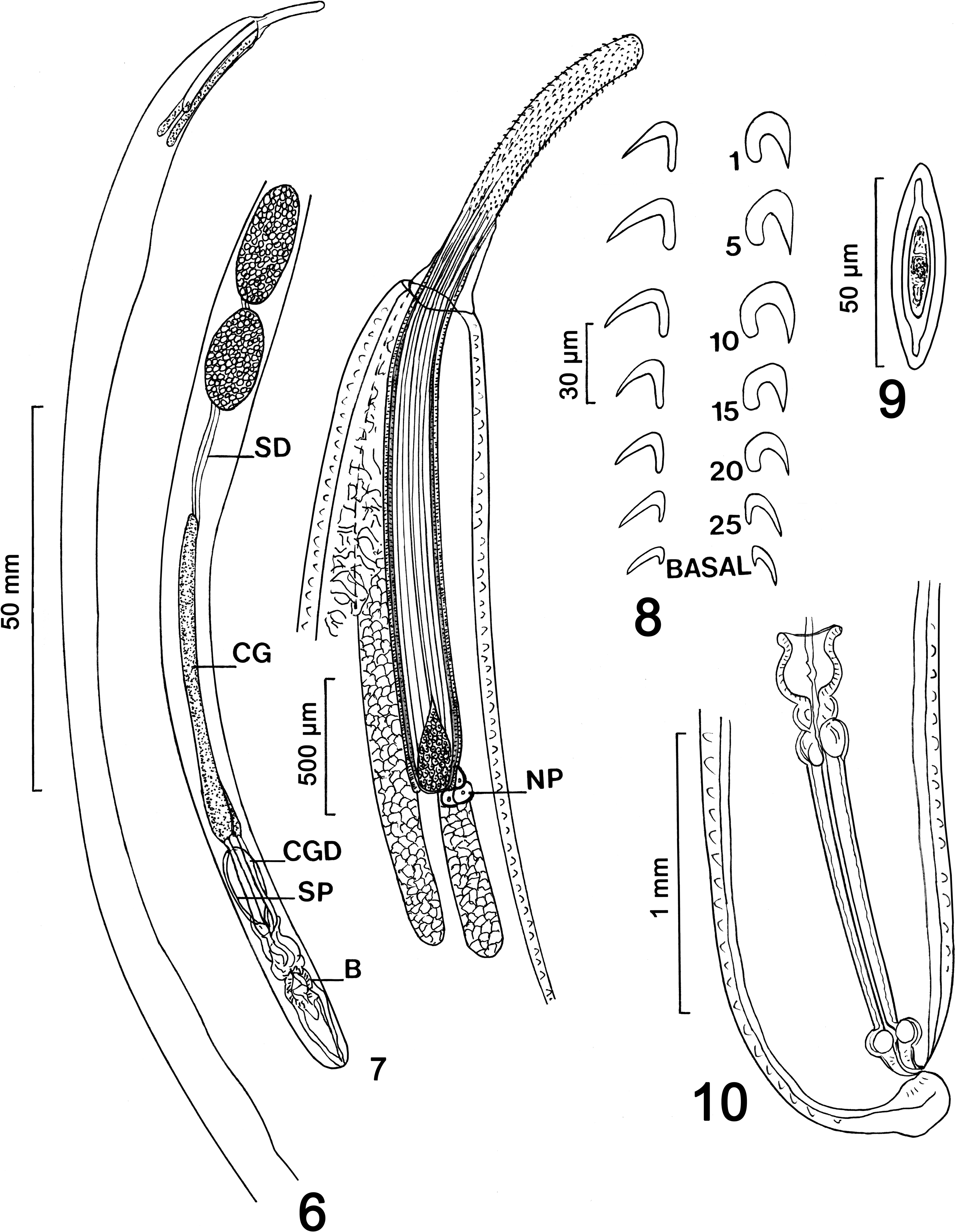

Scientific classification
- Kingdom: Animalia
- Phylum: Acanthocephala
- Class: Palaeacanthocephala
- Order: Echinorhynchida
- Family: Transvenidae; Pichelin & Cribb, 2001

= Transvenidae =

Family of thorny-headed worms

Transvenidae is a family of parasitic spiny-headed (or thorny-headed) worms in the order Echinorhynchida. This family contains three species divided into two genera.

== Taxonomy and description ==
Phylogenetic analysis has been conducted.

== Species ==
There are three genera and six species in the family Transvenidae: (Note: A binomial authority in parentheses indicates that the species was originally described in a genus other than the present genus.) (Note: Pararhadinorhynchus Johnston & Edmonds, 1947 including Pararhadinorhynchus magnus. Pararhadinorhynchus is sometimes classified within the Diplosentidae.)

=== Paratrajectura ===
Paratrajectura Amin, Heckmann et Ali, 2018 contains one species:

- Paratrajectura longcementglandatus Amin, Heckmann et Ali, 2018

=== Sclerocollum ===
Sclerocollum Schmidt and Paperna, 1978 contains three species:

- Sclerocollum robustum (Edmonds, 1964)
- Sclerocollum rubrimaris Schmidt and Paperna, 1978
- Sclerocollum saudii Al-Jahdali, 2010

=== Trajectura ===
Trajectura Pichelin & Cribb, 2001 contains two species: Trajectura is distinguished by the possession of only two cement glands and an anterior conical projection (function unknown) on the females.

- Trajectura ikedai (Machida, 1992)

Diplosentis ikedai was found to share similar anatomical features (only two cement glands and an anterior conical projection on females) was renamed T. ikedai.

- Trajectura perinsolens Pichelin and Cribb, 2001

T. perinsolens Was found parasitising the New Guinea wrasse Anampses neoguinaicus from the Great Barrier Reef, Queensland, Australia.

=== Transvena ===
Transvena Pichelin & Cribb, 2001 contains one species:

- Transvena annulospinosa Pichelin and Cribb, 2001

== Hosts ==
Hosts for Transvenidae species

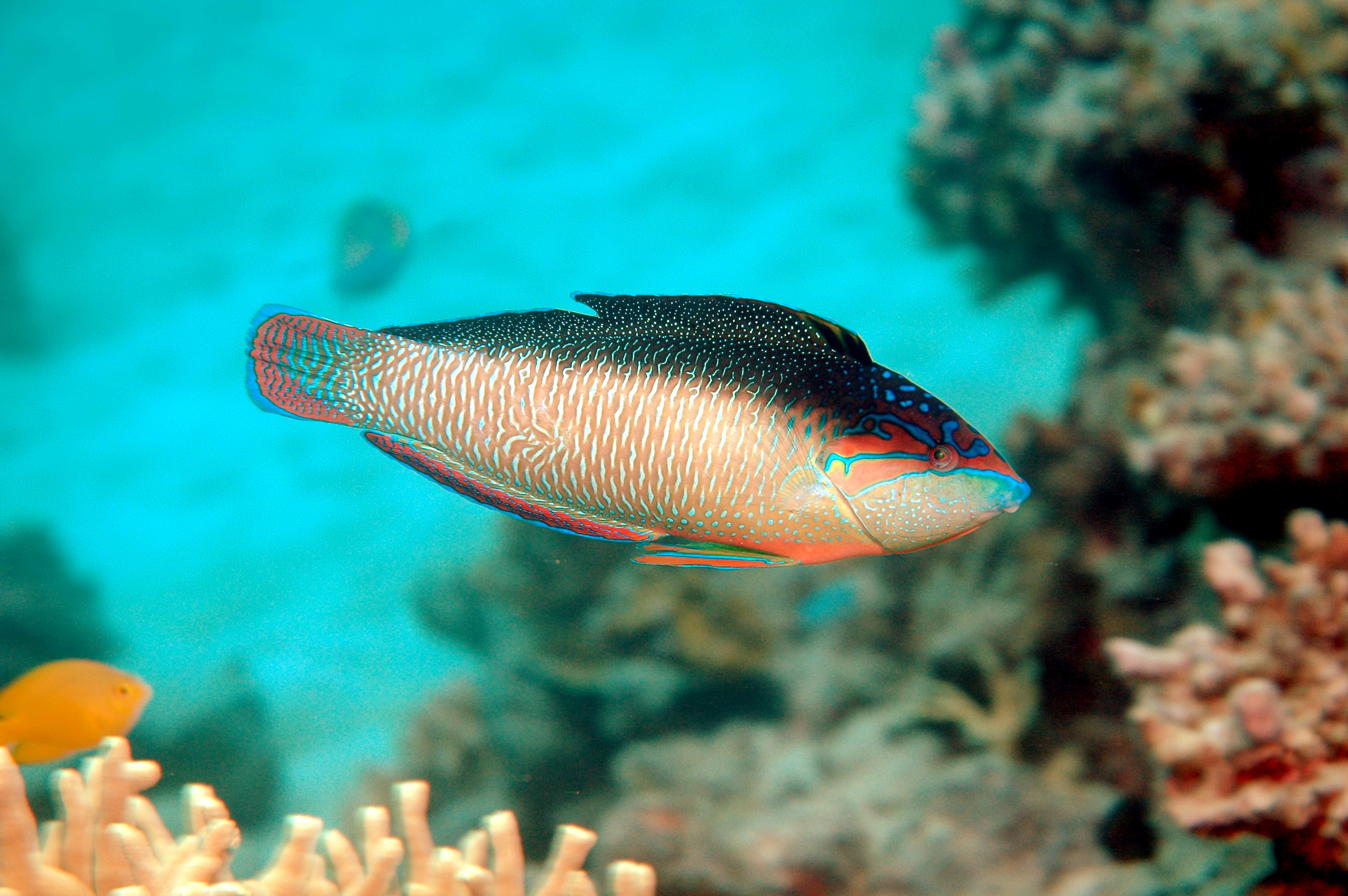
The New Guinea wrasse (Anampses neoguinaicus) is one of the hosts of T. perinsolens
