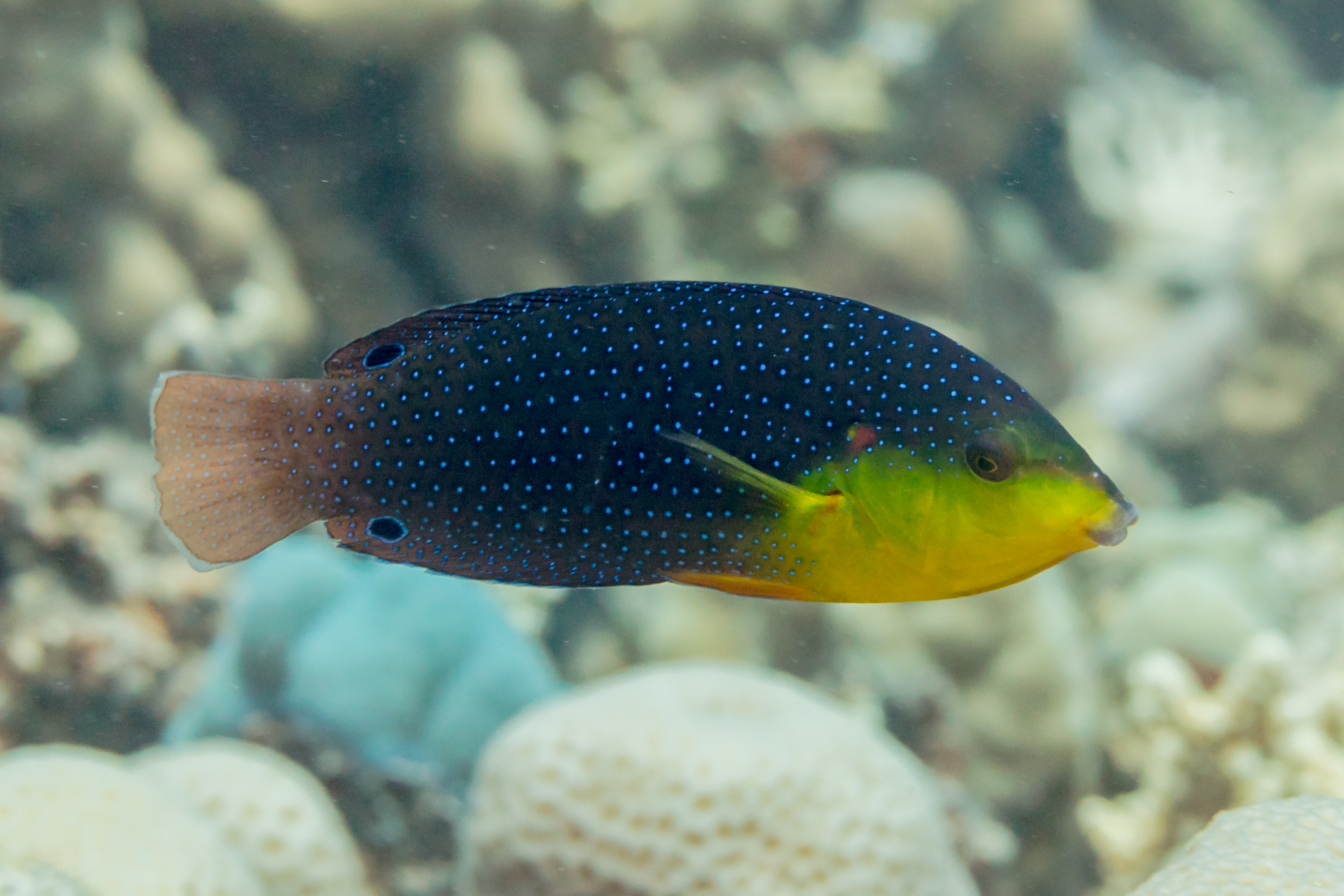

Conservation status
- Least Concern (IUCN 3.1)

Scientific classification
- Kingdom: Animalia
- Phylum: Chordata
- Class: Actinopterygii
- Order: Labriformes
- Family: Labridae
- Genus: Anampses
- Species: A. twistii

Binomial name
- Anampses twistii Bleeker, 1856

= Yellow-breasted wrasse =

Species of fish

The yellow-breasted wrasse, Anampses twistii, is a species of wrasse native to the tropical waters of the Indo-Pacific area from the Red Sea to the Tuamoto Islands. It is found in lagoons and on reefs at depths of 5 to 30 m (16 to 98 ft). It can reach a length of 18 cm (7.1 in). It is of minor importance to local commercial fisheries and can be found in the aquarium trade.

== Etymology ==
The specific name honours the Governor-General of the Dutch East Indies from 1851 to 1856 Albertus Jacobus Duymaer van Twist (1809-1887).
