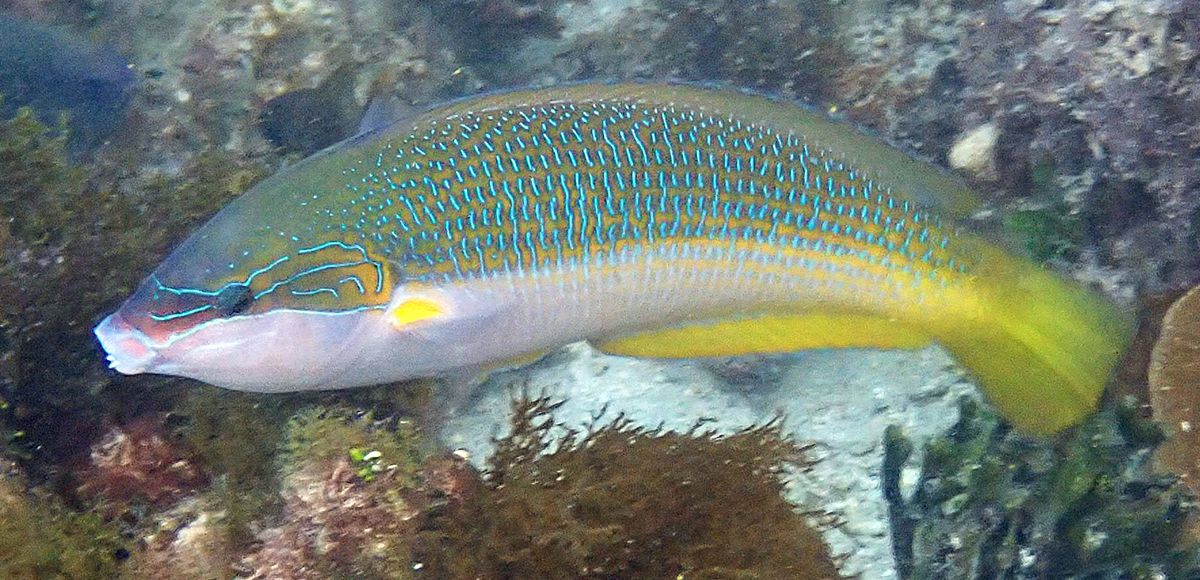
- At Norfolk Island

Conservation status
- Least Concern (IUCN 3.1)

Scientific classification
- Kingdom: Animalia
- Phylum: Chordata
- Class: Actinopterygii
- Order: Labriformes
- Family: Labridae
- Genus: Anampses
- Species: A. elegans

Binomial name
- Anampses elegans J. D. Ogilby, 1889

Synonyms
- Anampses variolatus J. D. Ogilby, 1889

= Elegant wrasse =

Species of fish

The elegant wrasse, Anampses elegans, is a species of wrasse native to the Pacific Ocean from Australia and New Zealand eastward to Easter Island. This species prefers lagoons and can also be found on coastal reefs at depths from 2 to 35 m (6.6 to 114.8 ft). This species can reach a length of 29 cm (11 in). It can be found in the aquarium trade.

== Gallery ==
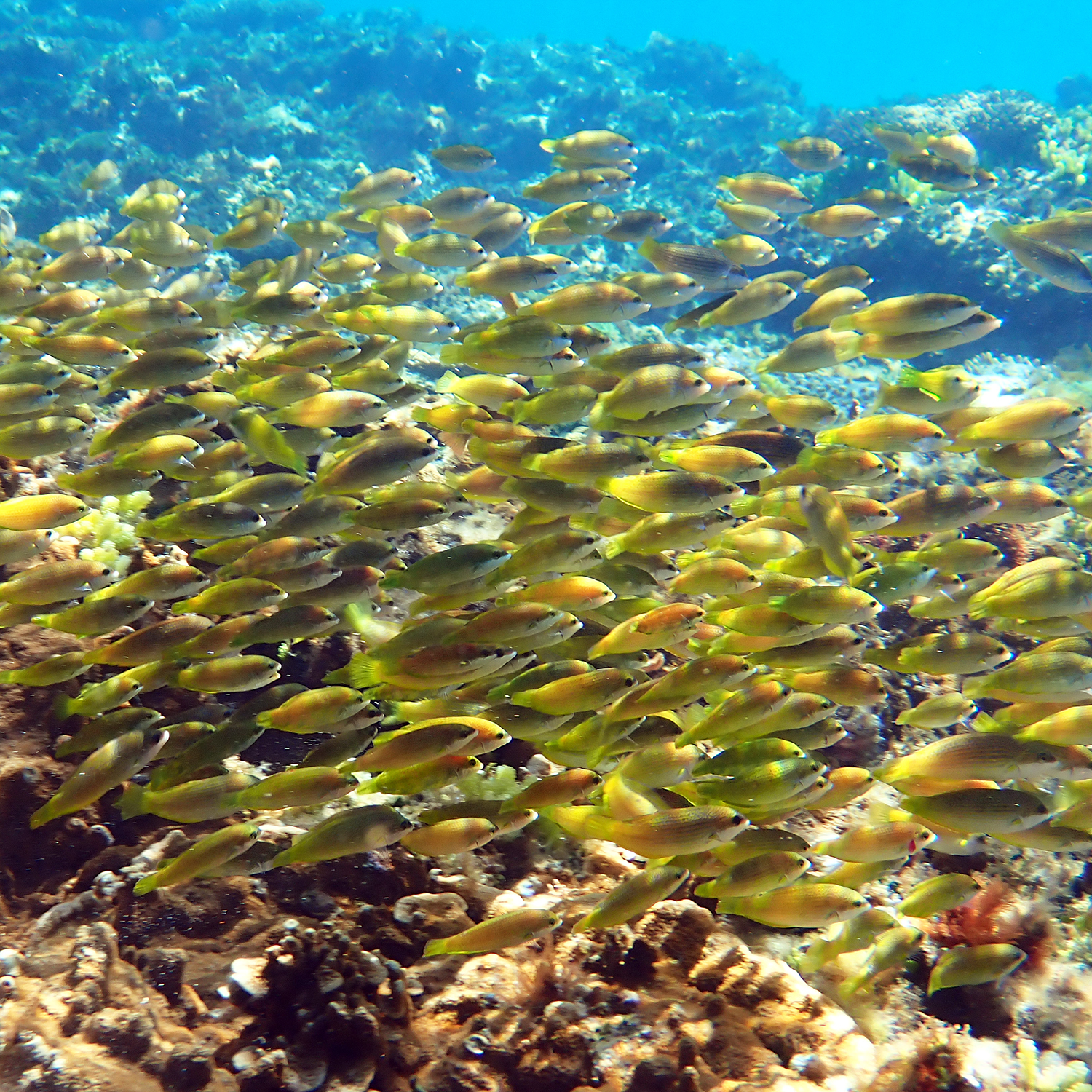
Schooling

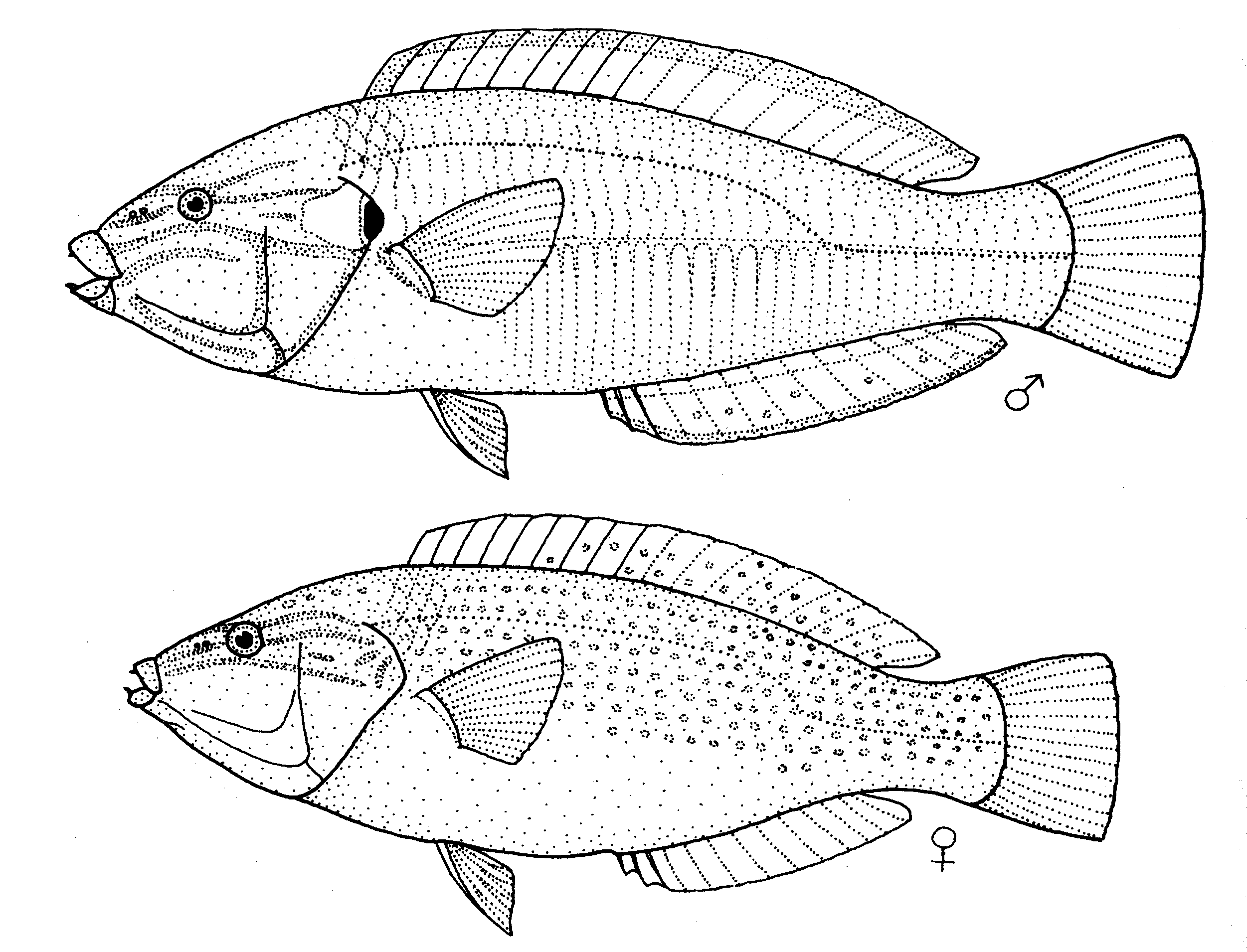
Male (top), female (bottom)
