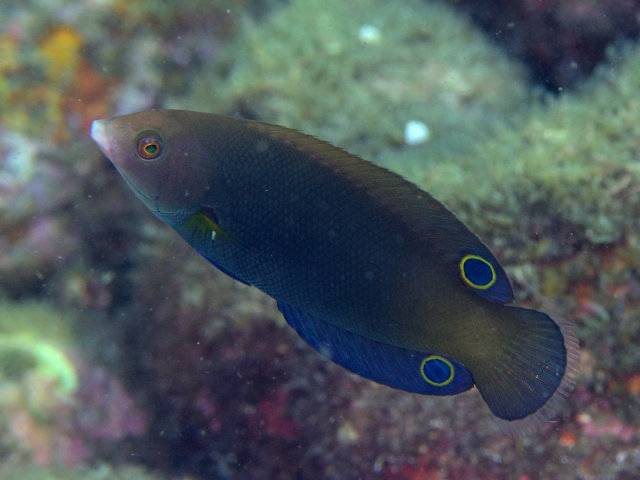
- Anampses geographicus

Conservation status
- Least Concern (IUCN 3.1)

Scientific classification
- Kingdom: Animalia
- Phylum: Chordata
- Class: Actinopterygii
- Order: Labriformes
- Family: Labridae
- Genus: Anampses
- Species: A. geographicus

Binomial name
- Anampses geographicus Valenciennes, 1840

= Anampses geographicus =

Species of fish

Anampses geographicus, the geographic wrasse, is a species of fish found in the Indo-West Pacific Ocean.

== Description ==
This species reaches a length of 31.0 cm (12.2 in).
