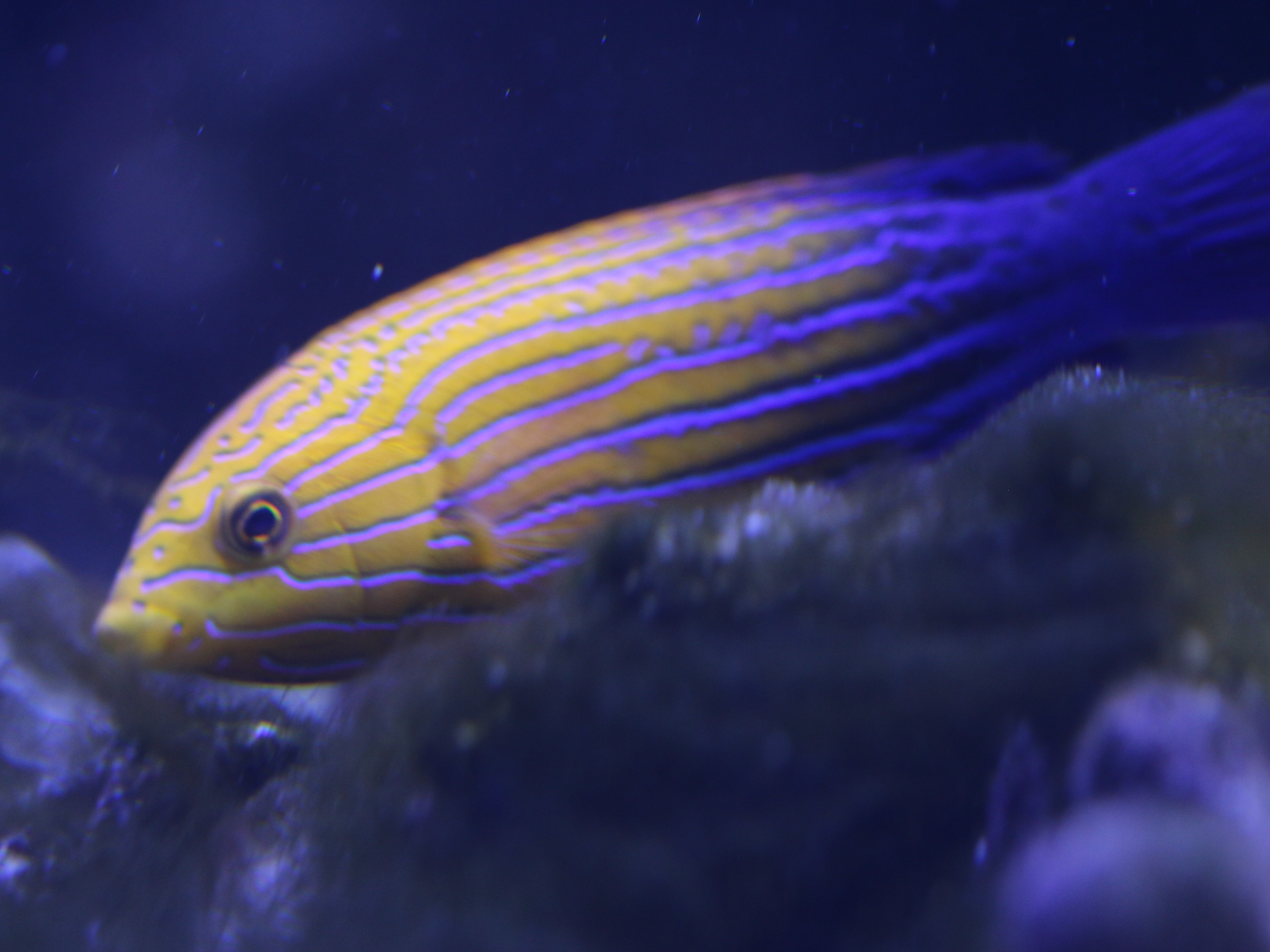

Conservation status
- Least Concern (IUCN 3.1)

Scientific classification
- Kingdom: Animalia
- Phylum: Chordata
- Class: Actinopterygii
- Order: Labriformes
- Family: Labridae
- Genus: Anampses
- Species: A. femininus

Binomial name
- Anampses femininus J. E. Randall, 1972

= Anampses femininus =

Species of fish

Anampses femininus, the blue-striped orange tamarin, is a species of fish found in the Pacific Ocean including Australia and from New Caledonia to Easter Island.

== Description ==
This species reaches a length of 24.0 cm (9.4 in).
