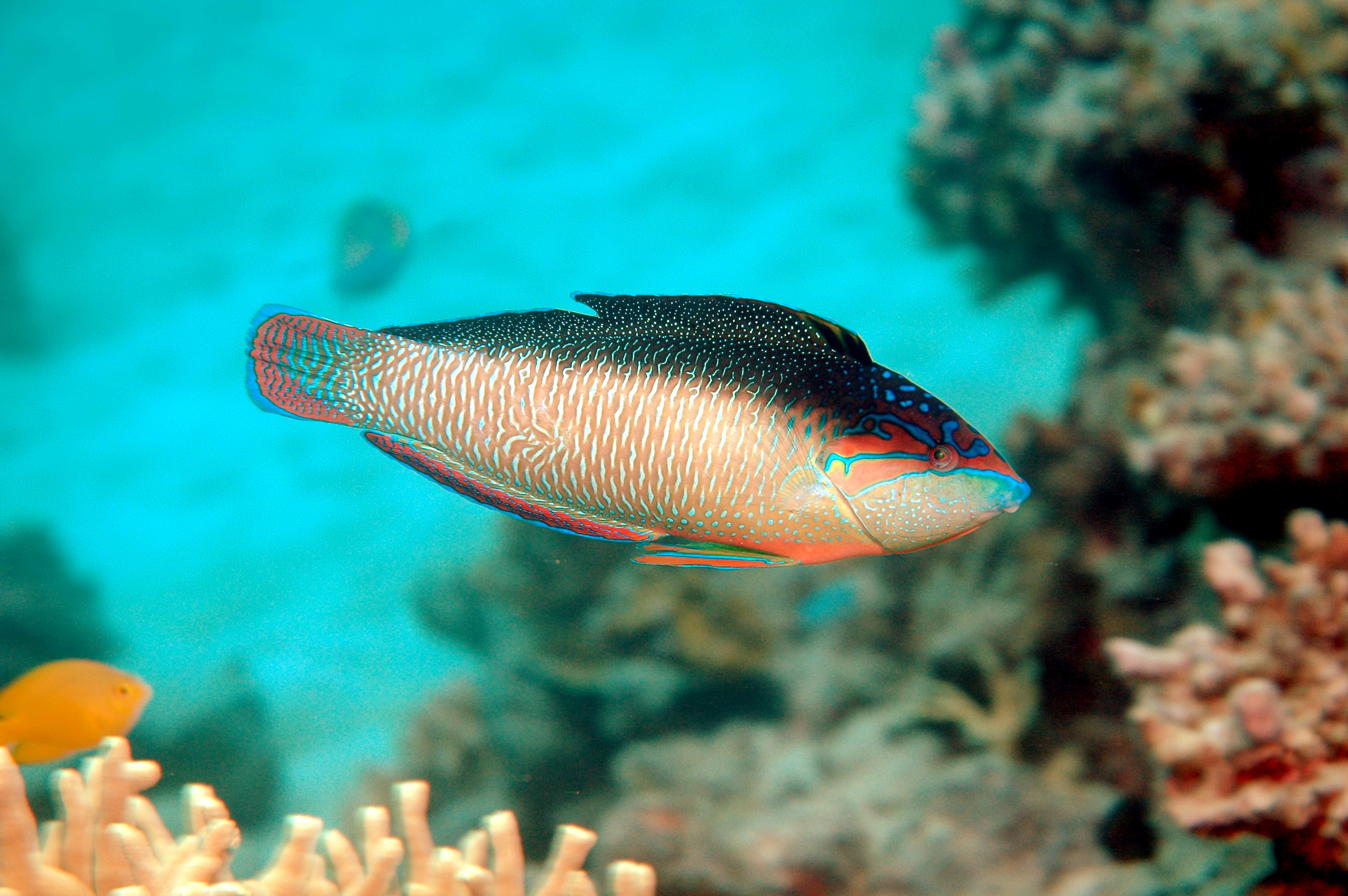

Conservation status
- Least Concern (IUCN 3.1)

Scientific classification
- Kingdom: Animalia
- Phylum: Chordata
- Class: Actinopterygii
- Order: Labriformes
- Family: Labridae
- Genus: Anampses
- Species: A. neoguinaicus

Binomial name
- Anampses neoguinaicus Bleeker, 1878

= Anampses neoguinaicus =

Species of fish

Anampses neoguinaicus, also known as the New Guinea wrasse and black-banded wrasse, is a species of fish found in the western Pacific Ocean.

== Description ==
This species reaches a length of 20.0 cm (7.9 in).
