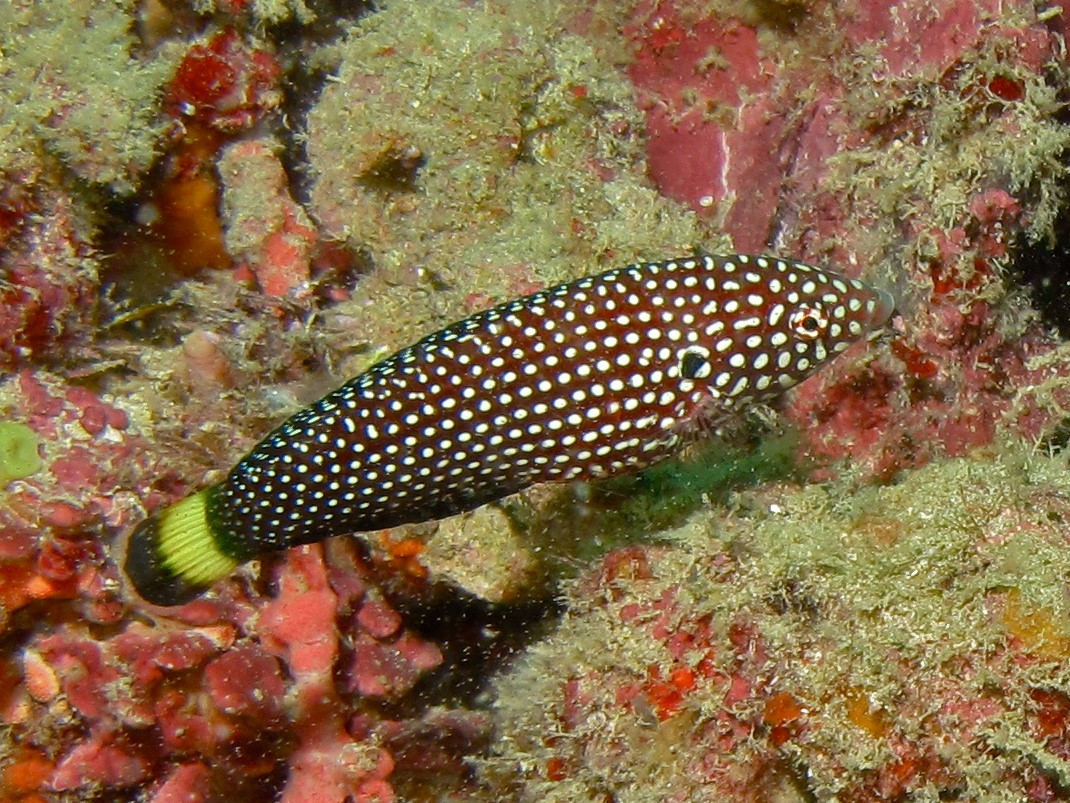

Conservation status
- Least Concern (IUCN 3.1)

Scientific classification
- Kingdom: Animalia
- Phylum: Chordata
- Class: Actinopterygii
- Order: Labriformes
- Family: Labridae
- Genus: Anampses
- Species: A. melanurus

Binomial name
- Anampses melanurus Bleeker, 1857

= Anampses melanurus =

Species of fish

Anampses melanurus, the white-spotted wrasse, is a species of fish found in the Pacific Ocean.

== Description ==
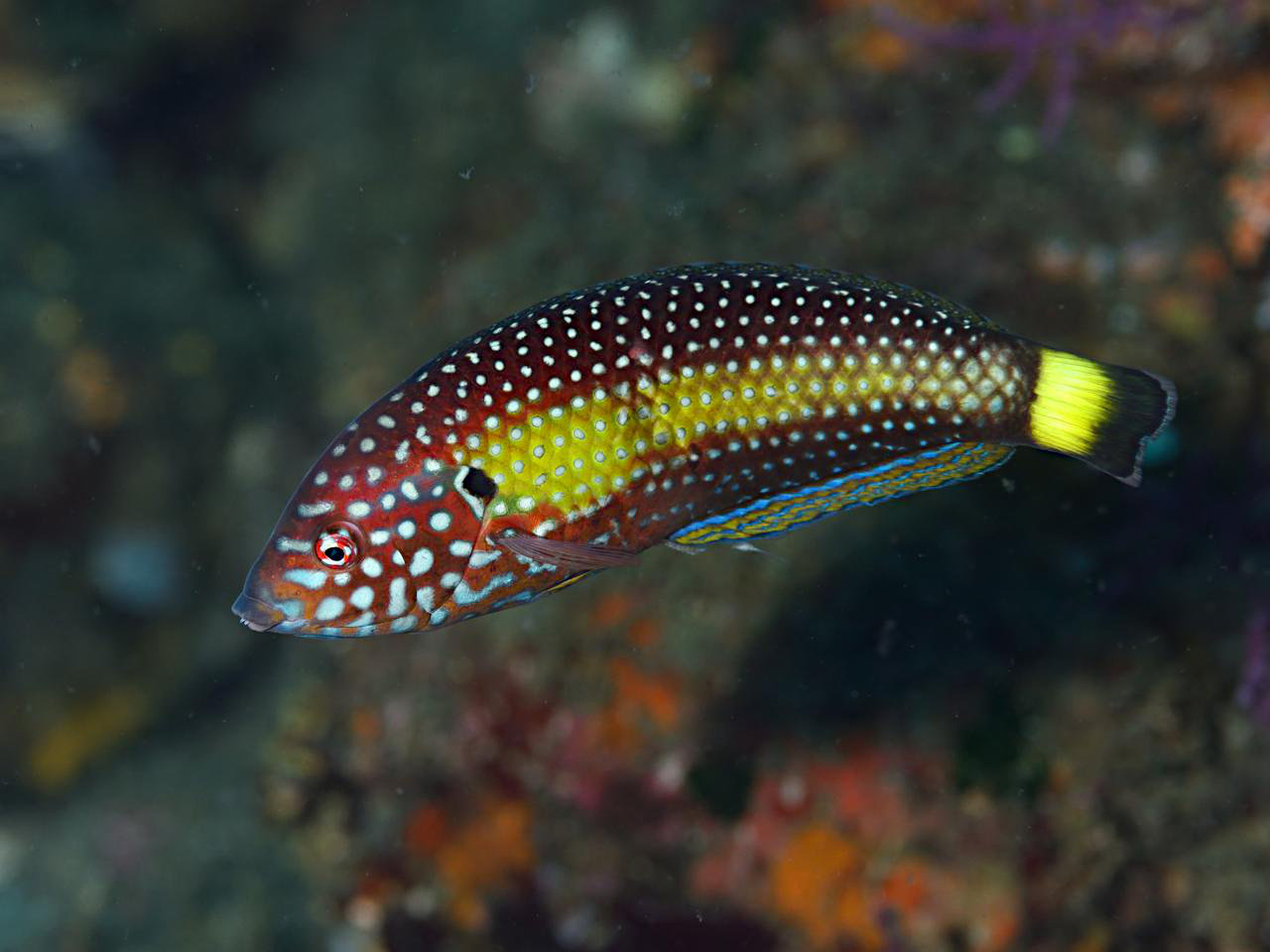
Terminal phase male

This species reaches a length of 12.0 cm (4.7 in).
