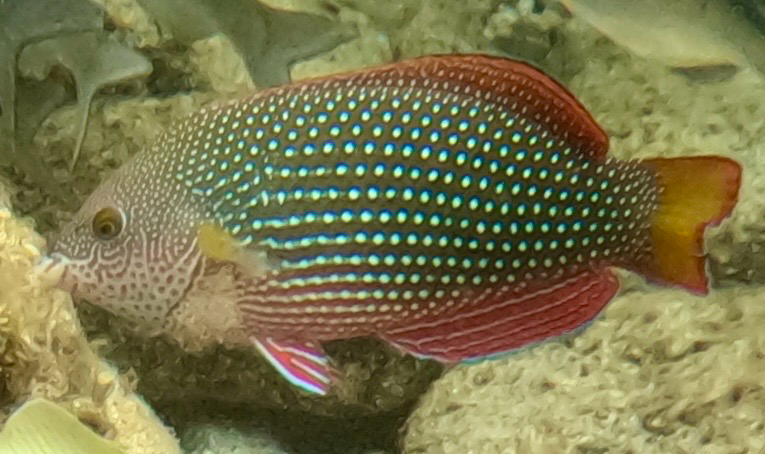

Conservation status
- Least Concern (IUCN 3.1)

Scientific classification
- Kingdom: Animalia
- Phylum: Chordata
- Class: Actinopterygii
- Order: Labriformes
- Family: Labridae
- Genus: Anampses
- Species: A. cuvier

Binomial name
- Anampses cuvier Quoy & Gaimard, 1824

= Anampses cuvier =

Species of fish

Anampses cuvier, the pearl wrasse, is a species of fish found in the Pacific Ocean.

== Description ==
This species reaches a length of 31.0 cm (12.2 in).

== Etymology ==
The fish is named in honor of French naturalist and zoologist Georges Cuvier.
