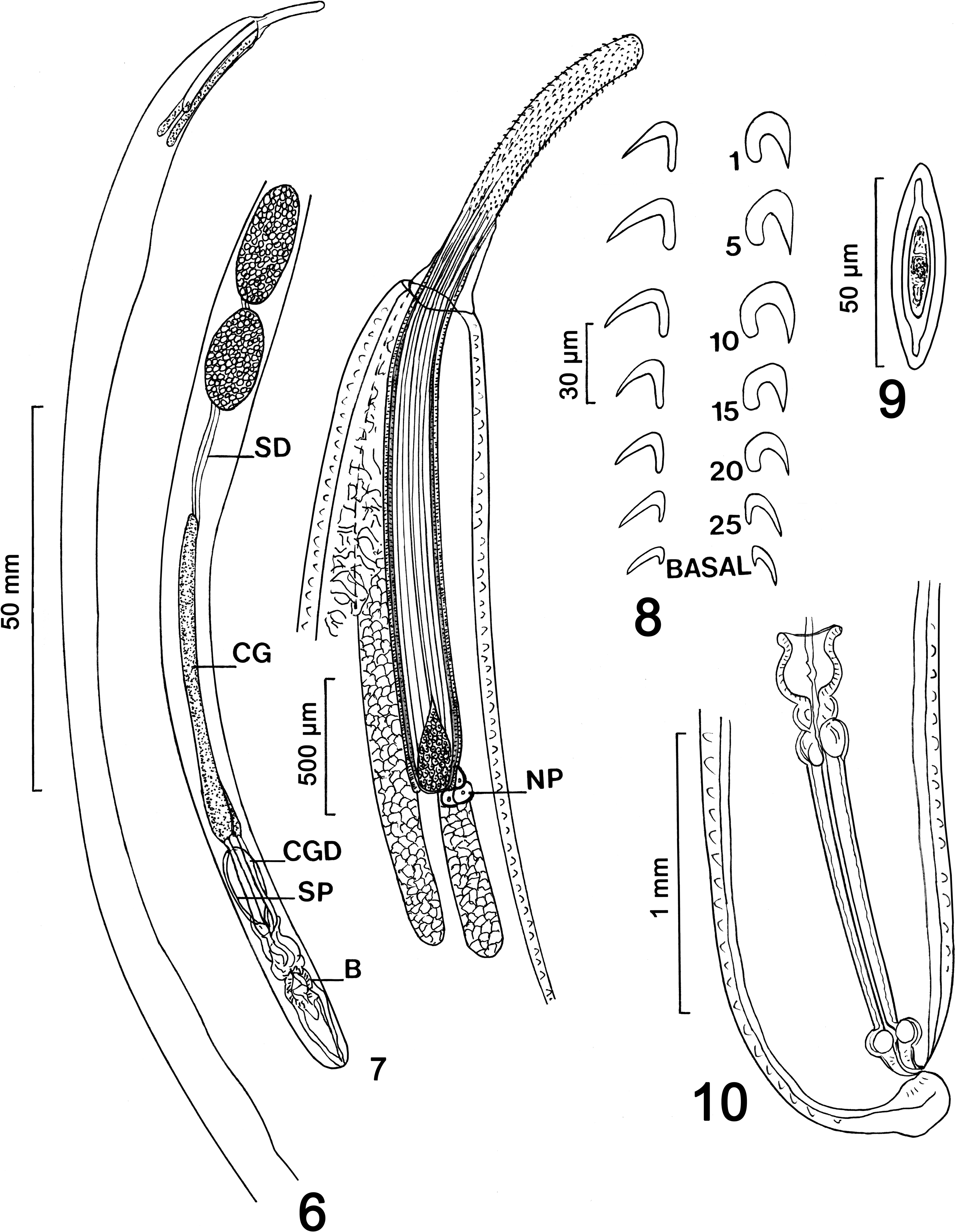
- Line drawing of Pararhadinorhynchus magnus

Scientific classification
- Domain: Eukaryota
- Kingdom: Animalia
- Phylum: Rotifera
- Class: Palaeacanthocephala
- Order: Echinorhynchida
- Family: Diplosentidae
- Genus: Pararhadinorhynchus; Johnston & Edmonds, 1947

= Pararhadinorhynchus =

Genus of worms

Pararhadinorhynchus is a genus of worms belonging to the family Diplosentidae.

The species of this genus are found in Australia.

Species:

- Pararhadinorhynchus coorongensis Edmonds, 1973
- Pararhadinorhynchus magnus Van Ha, Amin, Ngo & Heckmann, 2018
- Pararhadinorhynchus mugilis Johnston & Edmonds, 1947
- Pararhadinorhynchus sodwanensis Lisitsyna, Kudlai, Cribb & Smit, 2019
- Pararhadinorhynchus upenei Wang, Wang & Wu, 1993
