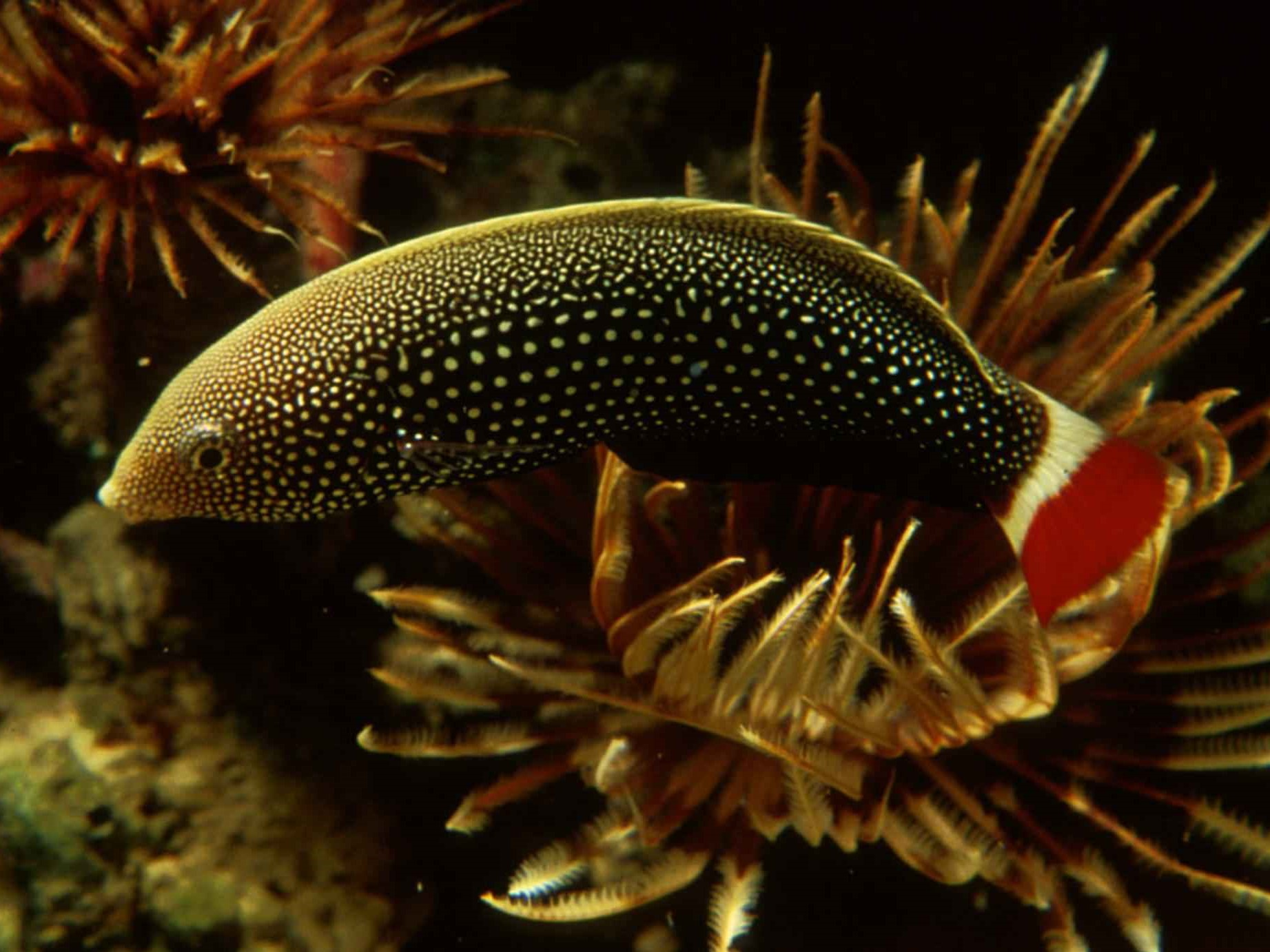

Conservation status
- Least Concern (IUCN 3.1)

Scientific classification
- Kingdom: Animalia
- Phylum: Chordata
- Class: Actinopterygii
- Division: Teleostei
- Order: Labriformes
- Family: Labridae
- Genus: Anampses
- Species: A. chrysocephalus

Binomial name
- Anampses chrysocephalus J. E. Randall, 1958

= Anampses chrysocephalus =

Species of fish

Anampses chrysocephalus, also known as red tail wrasse and psychedelic wrasse, is a small, reef-associated fish in the family Labridae endemic to the Hawaiian Islands.

== Description ==
Anampses chrysocephalus is known for its vibrant coloration and marked sexual dimorphism. Juveniles and females are typically dark brown or black with white spots on each scale and a red tail edged with a white band. Terminal-phase males exhibit bright orange-red heads with electric blue lines and spots, and their bodies display brown coloration with iridescent blue speckling. Males can reach a maximum length of about 17 cm, while females are smaller, usually between 7 and 10 cm. Like other members of its genus, the psychedelic wrasse is a protogynous hermaphrodite, capable of changing sex from female to male depending on social hierarchy.

== Distribution and habitat ==
Anampses chrysocephalus is endemic to the Hawaiian Islands. It typically inhabits reef slopes and rocky coastal areas, preferring sandy substrates with coral and rock cover. Adults are found at depths ranging from 15 to 50 meters, though the full depth range extends from 12 to 139 meters. Juveniles are often seen at slightly shallower depths.

== Human use ==
The psychedelic wrasse occasionally appears in the aquarium trade due to its striking appearance and behavior. However, it is considered a challenging species to maintain in captivity. It requires a well-established tank with sandy substrate, abundant live rock, and a diet of small invertebrates such as mysis shrimp and copepods. The species is sensitive to transportation and does best when introduced as a juvenile. In Hawaiʻi, this species is listed on the "White List" of aquarium fish permitted for collection, under regulations designed to promote sustainable harvesting.
