= Anampses lennardi =

Conservation status
- Least Concern (IUCN 3.1)

Scientific classification
- Kingdom: Animalia
- Phylum: Chordata
- Class: Actinopterygii
- Order: Labriformes
- Family: Labridae
- Genus: Anampses
- Species: A. lennardi

Binomial name
- Anampses lennardi T. D. Scott, 1959

Species of fish

Anampses lennardi, the blue-and-yellow wrasse, is a species of fish found in the eastern Indian Ocean.

== Description ==
This species reaches a length of 28.0 cm (11.0 in).

== Etymology ==
The fish is named in honor of Fynes Barrett-Lennard (1915–2008), an Australian landowner who collected many herpetological and ichthyological specimens for the Western Australia Museum.
