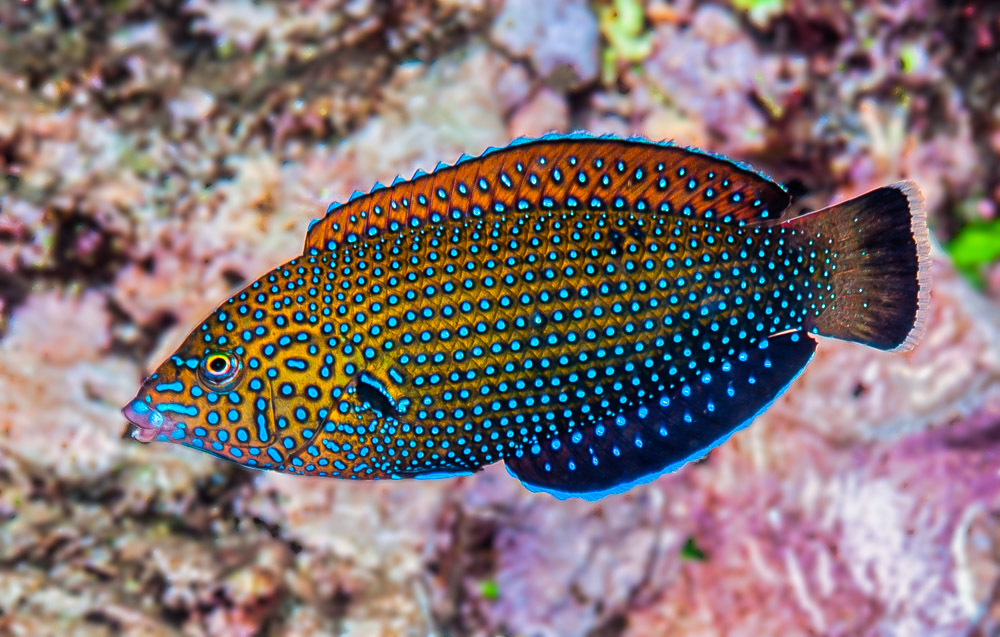
- Female
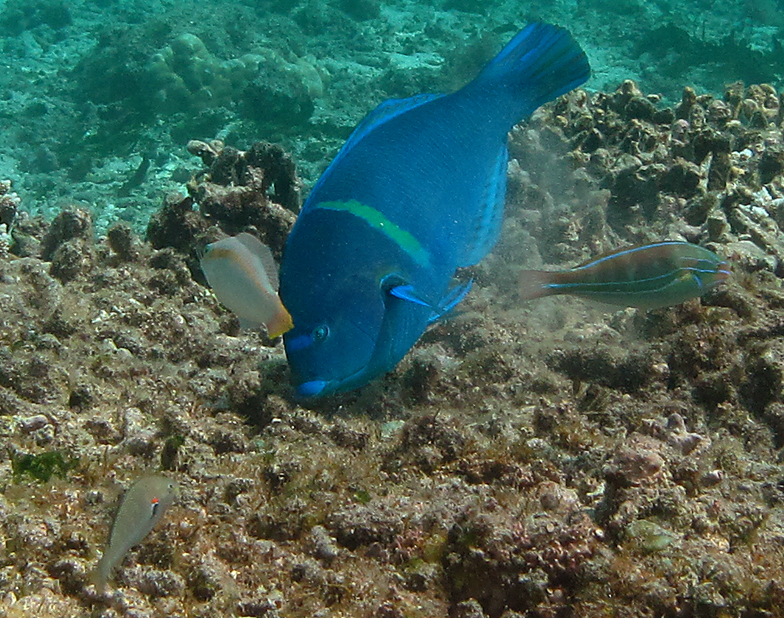
- Male

Conservation status
- Least Concern (IUCN 3.1)

Scientific classification
- Kingdom: Animalia
- Phylum: Chordata
- Class: Actinopterygii
- Order: Labriformes
- Family: Labridae
- Genus: Anampses
- Species: A. caeruleopunctatus

Binomial name
- Anampses caeruleopunctatus Rüppell, 1829

Synonyms
- List: Anampses diadematus Rüppell, 1835; Anampses lineolatus E. T. Bennett, 1836; Anampses chlorostigma Valenciennes, 1840; Anampses viridis Valenciennes, 1840; Anampses taeniatus Liénard, 1891; Anampses rubroviridis Liénard, 1891; Anampses pulcher Regan, 1913; Anampses tinkhami Fowler, 1946

= Blue-spotted wrasse =

Species of fish

The blue-spotted wrasse (Anampses caeruleopunctatus) is a species of wrasse found from the Atlantic coast of South Africa through the Indian Ocean to Japan and Australia east to Easter Island in the Pacific Ocean (though absent from Hawaii). This species is found at depths from 3 to 30 m (9.8 to 98.4 ft), with the adults preferring the surge zone on coral reefs or along rocky coastlines. Juveniles orient their bodies and move in such a way as to resemble floating leaves. This species can reach a length of 42 cm (17 in). It is of minor importance to local commercial fisheries and can be found in the aquarium trade.

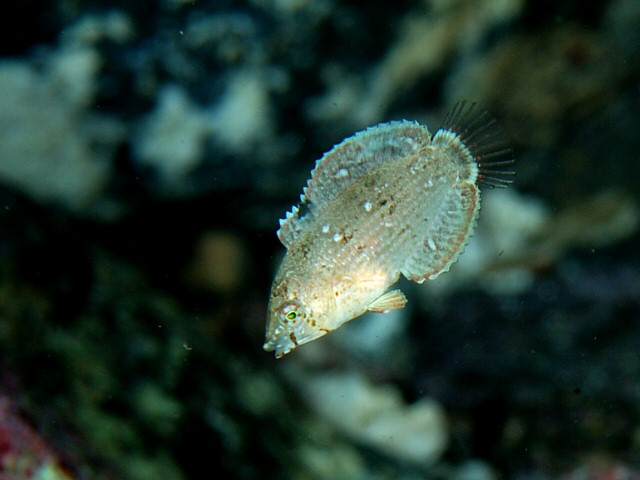
Juvenile

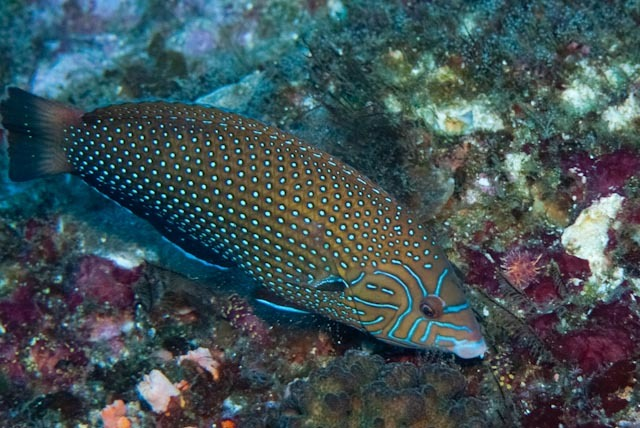
Female

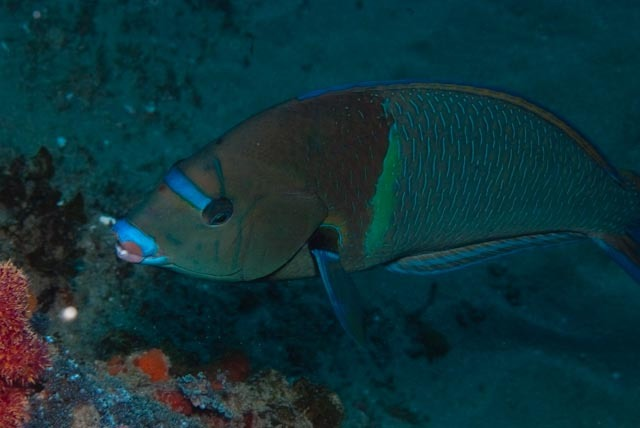
Male
