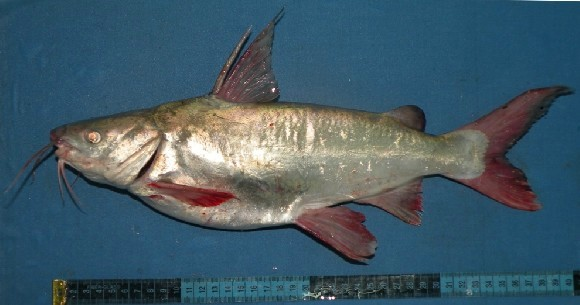

Conservation status
- Least Concern (IUCN 3.1)

Scientific classification
- Kingdom: Animalia
- Phylum: Chordata
- Class: Actinopterygii
- Order: Siluriformes
- Family: Ariidae
- Genus: Arius
- Species: A. arius

Binomial name
- Arius arius (Hamilton, 1822)

Synonyms
- Pimelodus arius Hamilton, 1822; Tachysurus arius (Hamilton, 1822); Arius falcarius Richardson, 1845; Bagrus crinalis Richardson, 1846; Pimelodus mong Richardson, 1846; Arius cochinchinensis Günther, 1864; Arius sinensis Mai, 1978; Arius boakeii Turner, 1867; Arius buchanani Day, 1877

= Threadfin sea catfish =

Species of fish

The threadfin sea catfish (Arius arius), also called the Hamilton's catfish, marine catfish or jella, is a species of sea catfish in the family Ariidae. It was described by Francis Buchanan-Hamilton in 1822, originally under the genus Pimelodus. It is migratory and is found in tropical brackish and marine waters in the Indo-western Pacific region, including Bangladesh, India, Cambodia, Malaysia, the Philippines, Pakistan, Sri Lanka, Myanmar, Hong Kong, Thailand, Vietnam, and China. It reaches a maximum standard length of 40 cm (16 in), but more commonly reaches an SL of 15 cm (5.9 in).

The diet of the threadfin sea catfish consists of finfish in the genus Stolephorus and silver bellies, as well as crabs, mollusks, prawns, and other invertebrates. It is of commercial interest to fisheries. The Red List of the International Union for Conservation of Nature (IUCN) currently rates the species as Least Concern due to its wide distribution and lack of known threats, although it states that the acquirement of empirical data on the effect of fisheries on the population may lead to a reassessment.

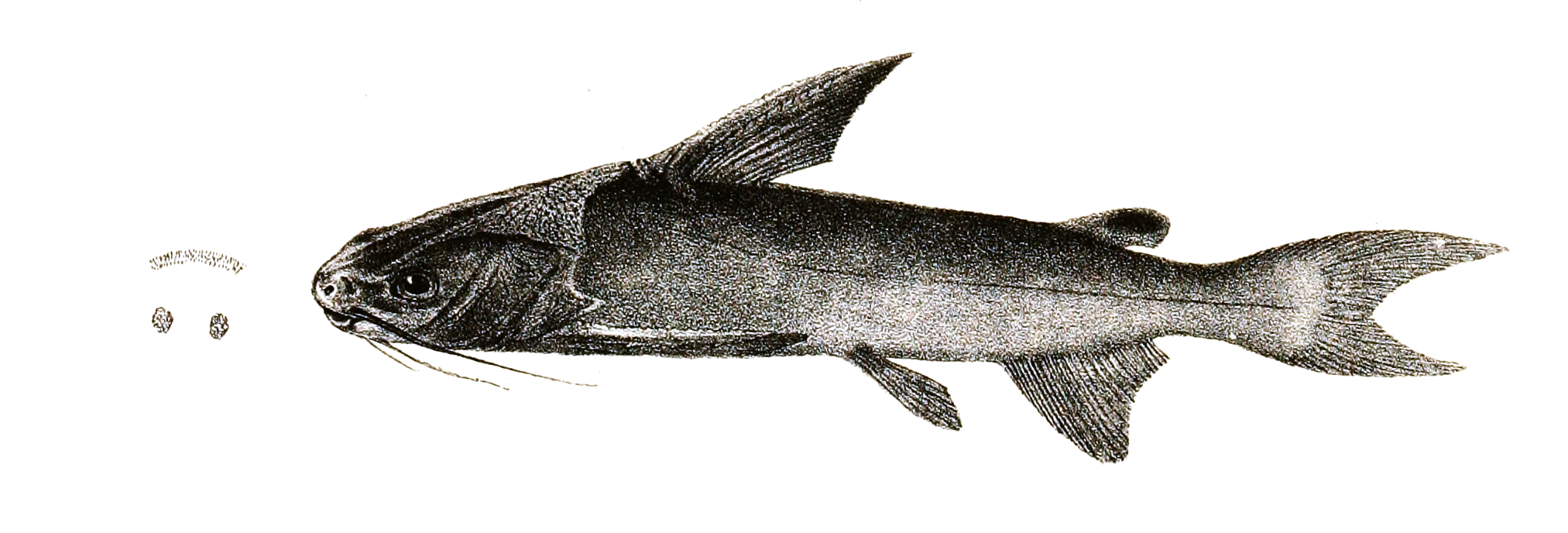
Mintern's illustration accompanying Francis Day's description of Arius buchanani, 1878

Threadfin sea catfish was found to be a host of an intestinal acanthocephalan worm, Diplosentis manteri.
