= Diplosentidae =

Scientific classification
- Kingdom: Animalia
- Phylum: Acanthocephala
- Class: Palaeacanthocephala
- Order: Echinorhynchida
- Family: Diplosentidae; Meyer, 1932

Family of thorny-headed worms

Diplosentidae is a family of parasitic worms from the order Echinorhynchida.

== Taxonomy ==
The family Diplosentidae was described by Tubangui and Masiluñgan in 1937 based on Diplosentis amphacanthi. The family now contains six genera divided into two subfamilies: Allorhadinorhynchinae and Diplosentinae. The family is characterised by the absence of spines on the trunk and the presence of just two cement glands (used to temporarily close the posterior end of the female after copulation), heavily coiled lemnisci (bundles of sensory nerve fibers) that are enclosed in a membranous sac. They also share similar hooks on the proboscis.

Golvan, in 1969, placed the genus Pararhadinorhynchus in the family Diplosentinae because they had two cement glands and no trunk spines. In the same year, Golvan created Allorhadinorhynchinae based on the genus Allorhadinorhynchus which has two cement glands and trunk spines. In 1978, Noronha et al. added the genus Golvanorhynchus and in 1996 Amin and Sey added the genus Slendrorhynchus and in 2000 Salgado-Maldonado and Santos added the genus Amapacanthus all within the Allorhadinorhynchinae subfamily.

Two of these genera (Golvanorhynchus and Slendrorhynchus) modified the concept of this family to include genera with more than two cement glands. The type species of Allorhadinorhynchus, A. segmentatum was described by Yamaguti in 1959 as having only two cement glands but Araki and Machida in 1987 showed that this species has four cement glands. They proposed the new combination of Micracanthorhynchina segmentata which implies membership of the Rhadinorhynchidae. As a result, they synonymized Allorhadinorhynchus with Micracanthorhynchina.

== Species ==
Arhythmacanthidae has 2 subfamilies (Allorhadinorhynchinae and Diplosentinae) and the following species:

=== Allorhadinorhynchinae Golvan, 1969 ===
==== Allorhadinorhynchus ====
Allorhadinorhynchus Yamaguti, 1959 contains one species.

- Allorhadinorhynchus segmentatum Yamaguti, 1959

A. segmentatum is the only species and thus the type species of the genus Allorhadinorhynchus. It parasitizes the Japanese halfbeak (Hyporhamphus sajori). It is proposed to be a synonym of Micracanthorhynchina by two studies.

=== Diplosentinae Tubangui and Masiluñgan, 1937 ===
==== Amapacanthus ====
Amapacanthus Salgado-Maldonado & Santos, 2000 contains one species.

- Amapacanthus amazonicus Salgado-Maldonado & Santos, 2000

A. amazonicus parasitizes the Passany sea catfish (Sciades passany reported as the synonym Arius passany) and the Foureyes (Anableps microlepis).

==== Diplosentis ====
Diplosentis Tubangui & Masilungan, 1937 contains two species.

- Diplosentis amphacanthi Tubangui & Masilungan, 1937

D. amphacanthi was collected in the Philippines from the White-spotted spinefoot (Siganus canaliculatus but reported as the synonym Amphacanthus oramin) which occurs widely in the tropical Indo-Pacific.

- Diplosentis manteri Gupta & Fatma, 1979

D. manteri was described from a single specimen from the Threadfin sea catfish (Arius arius) in India.

==== Pararhadinorhynchus ====
Pararhadinorhynchus Johnston and Edmonds, 1947 contains three species.

- Pararhadinorhynchus coorongensis Edmonds, 1973

P. coorongensis was found parasitizing the Yellow-eye mullet (Aldrichetta forsteri).

- Pararhadinorhynchus mugilis Johnston and Edmonds, 1947

It is commonly found parasitizing the Flathead grey mullet (Mugil cephalus).

- Pararhadinorhynchus upenei Wang, Wang and Wu, 1993

P. upenei was found parasitizing the Sulphur goatfish (Upeneus sulphureus).

== Hosts ==
Diplosentidae species parasitize fish hosts.

Hosts for Diplosentidae species

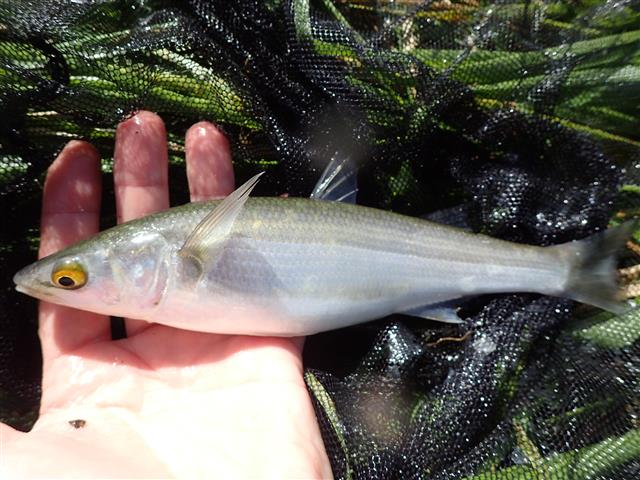
Pararhadinorhynchus coorongensis was found parasitizing the Yellow-eye mullet

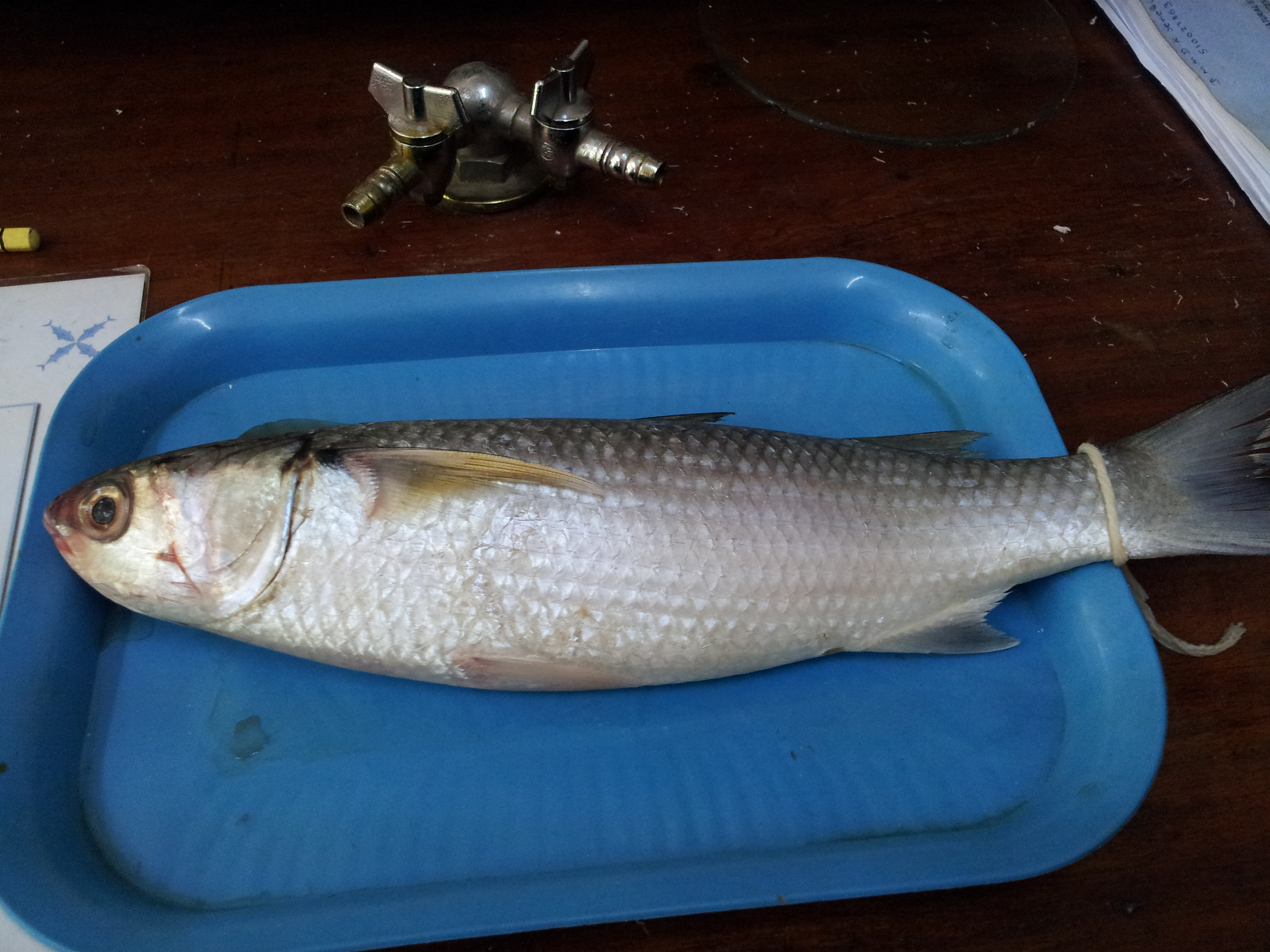
The Flathead grey mullet is one of the hosts of Pararhadinorhynchus mugilis
