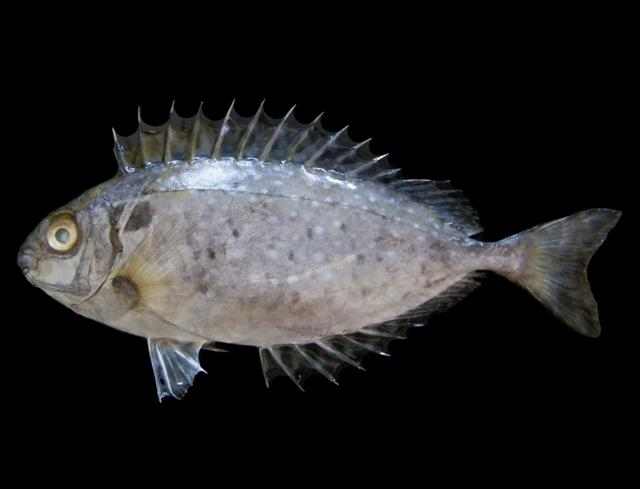

Conservation status
- Least Concern (IUCN 3.1)

Scientific classification
- Kingdom: Animalia
- Phylum: Chordata
- Class: Actinopterygii
- Division: Teleostei
- Order: Acanthuriformes
- Family: Siganidae
- Genus: Siganus
- Species: S. canaliculatus

Binomial name
- Siganus canaliculatus (Park, 1797)

Synonyms
- Chaetodon canaliculatus Park, 1797; Amphacanthus guttatus oramin Bloch & Schneider, 1801; Siganus oramin (Bloch & Schneider, 1801); Teuthis oramin (Bloch & Schneider, 1801); Amphacanthus dorsalis Valenciennes, 1835; Teuthis dorsalis (Valenciennes, 1835)

= Siganus canaliculatus =

Species of ray-finned fish

Siganus canaliculatus, the white-spotted spinefoot, white-spotted rabbitfish, pearly spinefoot, seagrass rabbitfish, slimy spinefoot or smudgespot spinefoot is a species of marine ray-finned fish, a rabbitfish belonging to the family Siganidae. It is native to the western Pacific Ocean and Indian Ocean where it occurs on reefs and in lagoons.

== Taxonomy ==
Siganus canaliculatus was first formally described in 1797 as Chaetodon canaliculatus by the Scottish explorer Mungo Park with the type locality given as Bengkulu Province on Sumatra. This taxon is largely sympatric with the mottled spinefoot (Siganus fuscescens) and these taxa are also very similar in appearance. Molecular analyses in 2011 found that there were three separate lineages within S. canaliculatus and S. fuscescens, that these lineages interbred and that each lineage had specimens which referred to either taxon, this suggests that S. canaliculatus is a junior synonym of S. fuscescens. This is not the position taken by FishBase or Catalog of Fishes. The specific name canaliculatus means "grooved", a reference to the grooves in the fin spines. Park did not know that, like all rabbitfishes, these spines contained venom glands for defence.

== Description ==
Siganus canaliculatus has a moderately slender, laterally compressed body, the standard length being 2.3 to 2.8 times its depth. The dorsal profile of the head is weakly to notably concave over the eyes with a pointed snout. The front nostril has a flap, in juveniles this covers the rear nostril, although it becomes shorter as the fish grows and is completely absent in the oldest fishes. The dorsal fin has 13 spines and 10 soft rays while the anal fin has 7 spines and 9 soft rays. The front spine on the dorsal fin points forwards. The caudal fin is nearly emarginate in smaller individuals of less than 10 cm (3.9 in) standard length becoming forked in larger fish. This species attains a maximum total length of 40 cm (16 in), although 20 cm (7.9 in) is more typical.

The colour and pattern of the white-spotted spinefoot is very variable. It can be greenish grey to yellow brown and is marked with 100-200 iridescent blue to whitish spots on the nape and anterior part of the body, these are similar in size to a match-head on the lower flanks. There are 2 to 3 rows between the first spine of the dorsal fin and the lateral line, which are roughly one sixth the size of the eye, and another 10 or so rows between the uppermost point of the lateral line and the base of the first spine in the anal fin. Alarmed or injured fishes adopt a pattern where their flanks are mottled with patches of light and dark brown and cream, forming a pattern of 6 or 7 uniformly spaced, dark oblique zones with lighter zones of similar breadth separating them. There is normally dark spot immediately to the rear of the upper end of gill opening, this spot is similar in size to the eye, and a thin bar along the upper margin of the operculum.

== Distribution and habitat ==
Siganus canaliculatus has a wide Indo-Pacific distribution, ranging from the Persian Gulf to the Philippines and New Guinea, north to the Ryukyu Islands and south to northern Australia. It is found at depths down to 50 m (160 ft) with adults living in inshore waters, on algae reefs, in estuaries and in large lagoons where there is algae growing over rubble. The juveniles live in coral reef flats and shallow bays.

== Biology ==
Siganus canaliculatus is said to be able to tolerate more turbid waters than the closely related S. fuscescens and may be found near river mouths, particularly where there are beds of sea grass. The adults can sometimes be found quite far offshore, in clear, deep waters. The juveniles form very large schools, which reduce in size as the fishes mature; adults occur in groups of around 20 individuals. When spawning, the adults gather in much larger aggregations. These fishes have only been observed to spawn from April to July. However, gonadosomatic indices suggest that there is another, less defined spawning period in November. Spawning events are synchronised with the lunar cycle. A mature female can spawn a number of times in a season, laying up to a million eggs. This is a herbivorous species which feeds on benthic algae and, to a lesser extent, on sea grass. This species, like other siganids, has venom glands located in grooves on the spines of the dorsal and anal fins.

White-spotted spinefoot was found to be a host of an intestinal acanthocephalan worm, Diplosentis amphacanthi.

== As food ==
Siganus canaliculatus is an important quarry species for commercial fisheries. In the Persian Gulf it is considered to be a good quality food fish, even though it is a rather small species. It is caught using bottom trawls and seine nets in coastal waters wherever it occurs. In the Persian Gulf, this species is caught largely by trapping in fences made up of nets in the inter-tidal zone and dome-shaped metal traps called gargoors. The fish landed are sold fresh in large numbers. This species is also taken as bycatch.

The Teochews of Singapore and Malaysia are particularly fond of this fish, which they refer to as pek tor her (Chinese: 白肚鱼; pinyin: báitùyú; lit. 'white rabbit fish'). It is typically steamed and eaten with rice or as part of the Teochew porridge spread. The white-spotted spinefoot is particularly popular during Chinese New Year, when the fish is heavy with milt and roe and its consumption is considered auspicious. For this reason, it is also known as pai ni her (Chinese: 拜年鱼; pinyin: bàiniányú; lit. 'Chinese New Year fish').

The white-spotted spinefoot has been used for mariculture in some areas in which it occurs because it has herbivorous habits, grows rapidly and is economically valuable. In some parts of this species' range the stock has been overfished.
