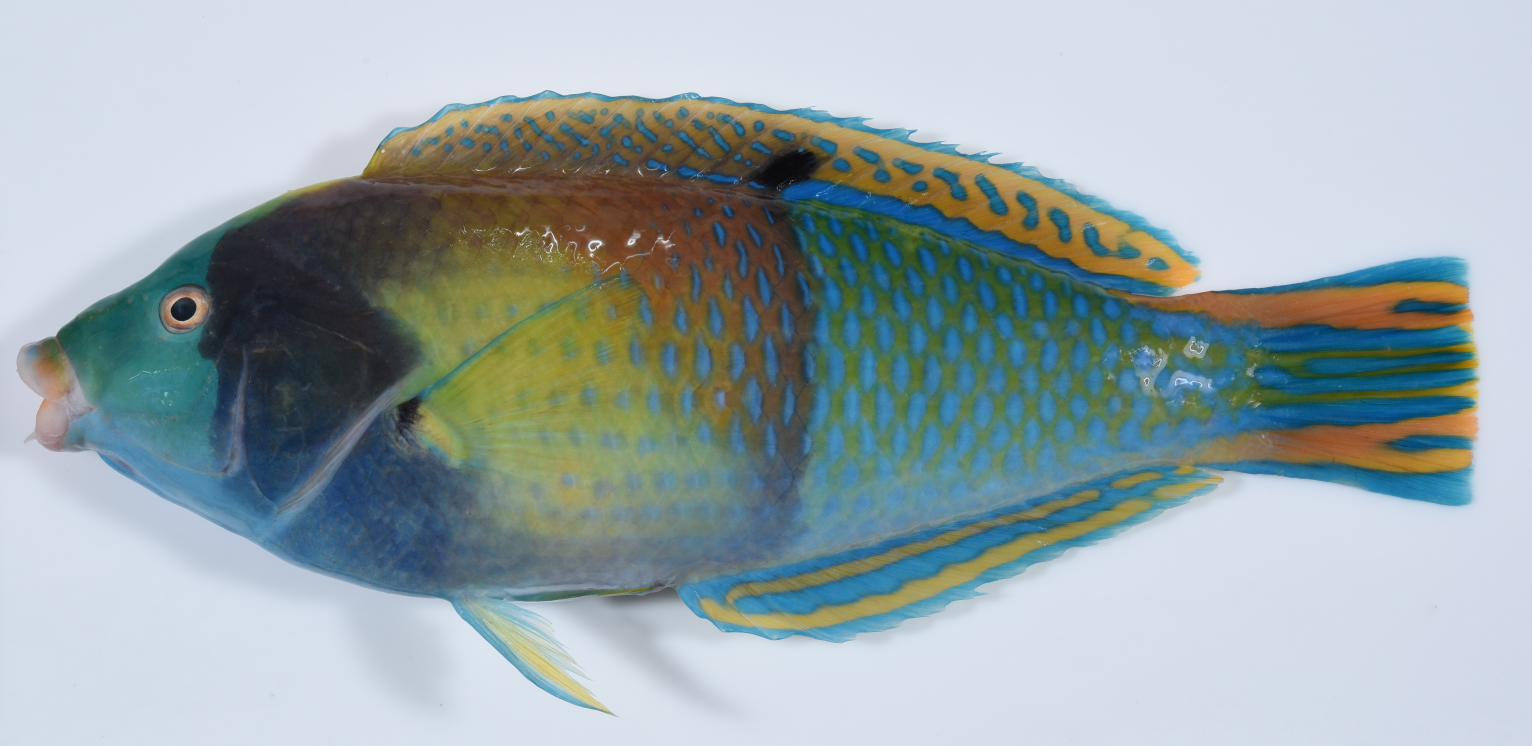
- A. lennardi (terminal phase)
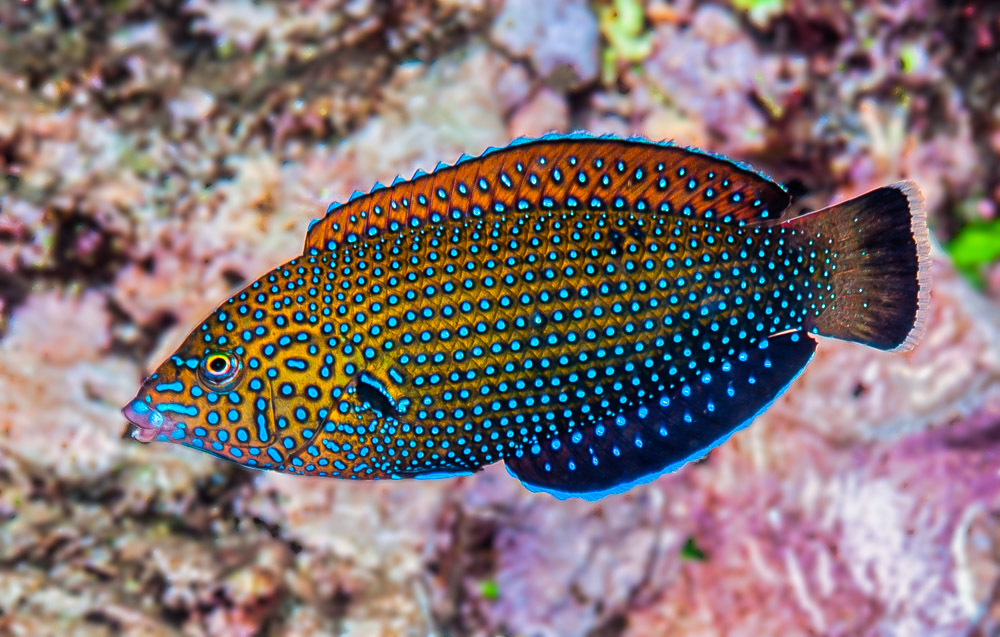
- A. caeruleopunctatus (initial phase)

Scientific classification
- Domain: Eukaryota
- Kingdom: Animalia
- Phylum: Chordata
- Class: Actinopterygii
- Order: Labriformes
- Family: Labridae
- Tribe: Julidini
- Genus: Anampses; Quoy & Gaimard, 1824

Type species
- Anampses cuvier Quoy & Gaimard, 1824

Synonyms
- Ampheces D. S. Jordan & Snyder, 1902; Anampsodax Bleeker, 1874; Pseudanampses Bleeker, 1862

= Anampses =

Genus of fishes

Anampses is a genus of wrasses native to the Indian and Pacific Oceans.

== Species ==
The currently recognized species in this genus are:

| Species | Common name | Image |
|---|---|---|
| Anampses caeruleopunctatus Rüppell, 1829 | blue-spotted wrasse | |
| Anampses chrysocephalus J. E. Randall, 1958 | red-tail wrasse | |
| Anampses cuvier Quoy & Gaimard, 1824 | pearl wrasse | |
| Anampses elegans J. D. Ogilby, 1889 | elegant wrasse | |
| Anampses femininus J. E. Randall, 1972 | blue-striped orange tamarin | |
| Anampses geographicus Valenciennes, 1840 | geographic wrasse | |
| Anampses lennardi T. D. Scott, 1959 | blue and yellow wrasse | |
| Anampses lineatus J. E. Randall, 1972 | lined wrasse | |
| Anampses melanurus Bleeker, 1857 | white-spotted wrasse | |
| Anampses meleagrides Valenciennes, 1840 | spotted wrasse | |
| Anampses neoguinaicus Bleeker, 1878 | New Guinea wrasse | |
| Anampses twistii Bleeker, 1856 | yellow-breasted wrasse | |
